= Cultural depictions of Elizabeth I =

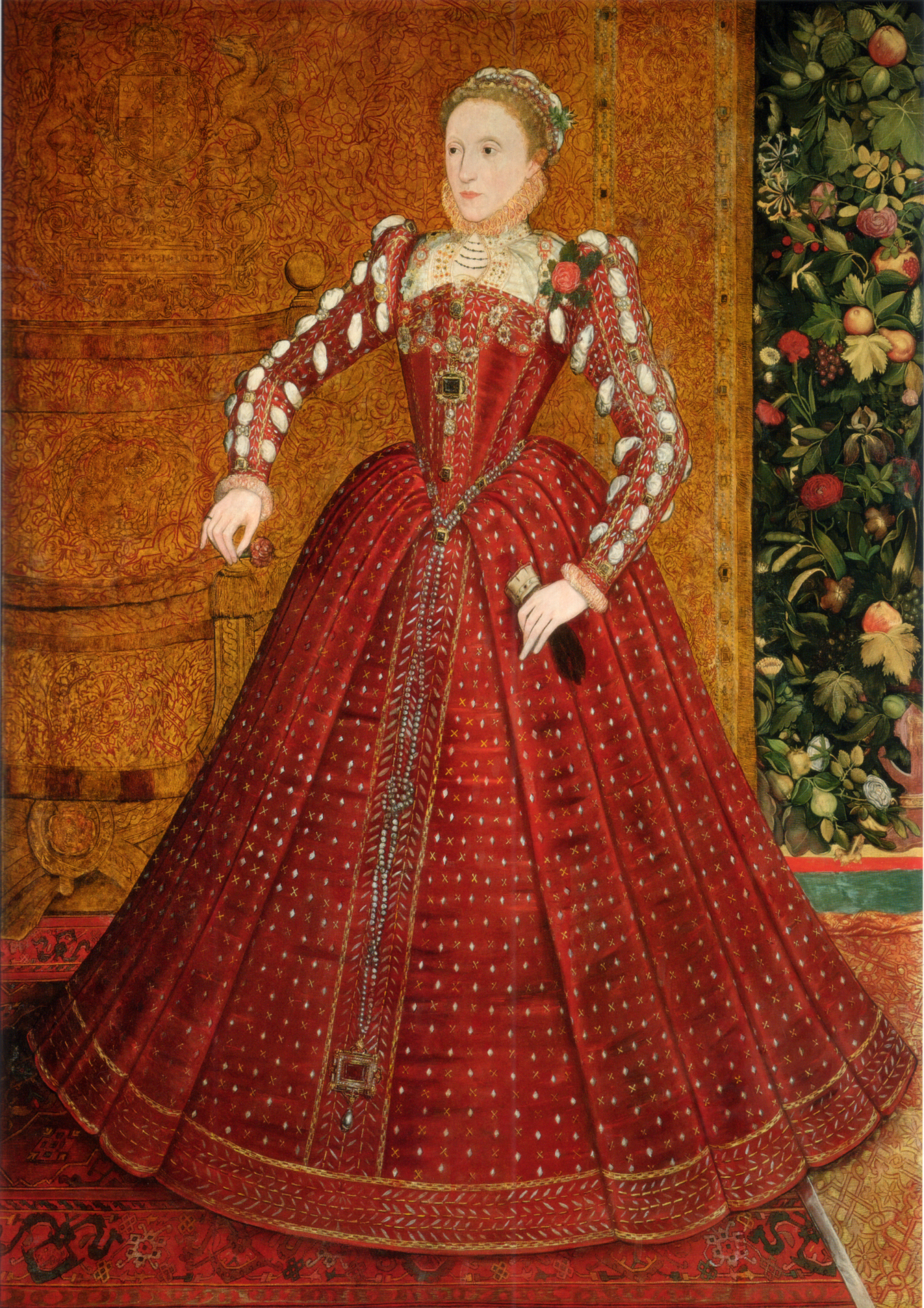
Elizabeth I, by Steven van der Meulen, 1560s

Elizabeth I of England has inspired artistic and cultural works for over four centuries. The following lists cover various media, enduring works of high art, and recent representations in popular culture, film, and fiction. The entries represent portrayals that a reader has a reasonable chance of encountering rather than a complete catalogue.

== Art, entertainment, and media ==
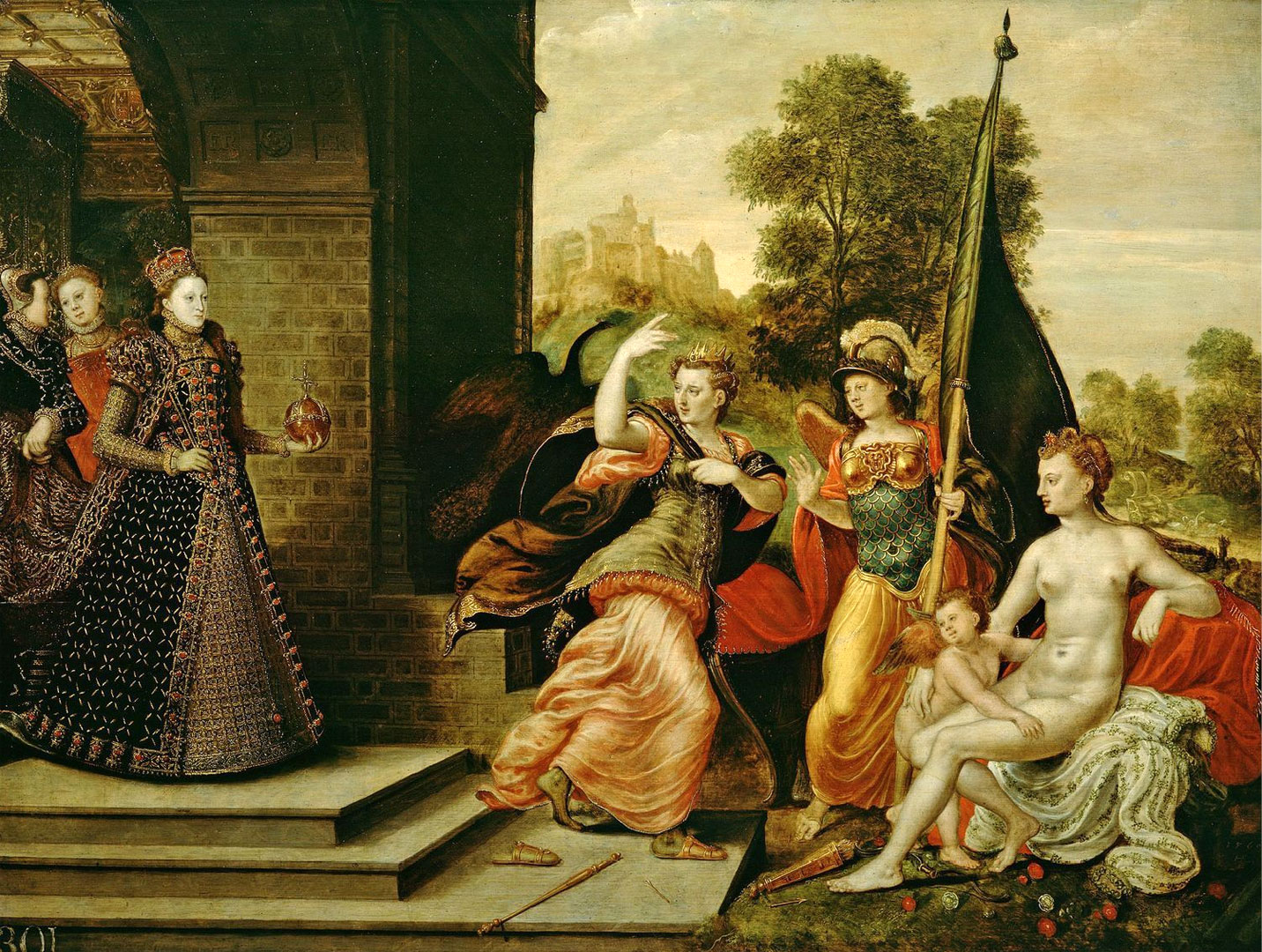
Allegoric representation of Elizabeth I with the goddesses Juno, Athena, and Venus/Aphrodite, by Joris Hoefnagel or Hans Eworth, ca 1569

There have been numerous notable portrayals of Queen Elizabeth in a variety of art forms, and she is the most filmed British monarch. George MacDonald Fraser wrote "no historic figure has been represented more honestly in the cinema, or better served by her players".

=== Anime ===
- In the anime Code Geass: Lelouch of the Rebellion, which is set in an alternate time line, Elizabeth (who remained single throughout her life even in this alternate history), bears an illegitimate son. The potential fathers—Robert Dudley, 1st Earl of Leicester; Robert Devereux, 2nd Earl of Essex; and Carl, Duke of Britannia—gain influence and power with this knowledge. After Elizabeth's death in 1603, the Golden Age of the Tudor dynasty begins when her son, who would become Henry IX, ascends to the throne.
- The Phantom Blood arc of JoJo's Bizarre Adventure tells the story of the fictional knights Tarkus and Bruford, who served Mary, Queen of Scots. In the story, Elizabeth tricks them into accepting execution in return for Mary's safety.

=== Art ===
- The Portraiture of Elizabeth I glorified her during her reign and masked her age in the later portraits. Elizabeth was often painted in rich and stylised gowns. Elizabeth is sometimes shown holding a sieve, a symbol of virginity.
- The installation artwork The Dinner Party features a place setting for Elizabeth.

=== Comics ===
There have been numerous depictions of Elizabeth I in satirical drawings. In actual comic books and strips, her appearances include:

- Startling Comics #5 (February 1, 1941)
- Real Life Comics #2 (December 1, 1941), #12 (July 1, 1943), #25 (September 1, 1945)
- Marvel 1602 #1, #2, #3
- Afterschool Charisma #1, #6, #7, #8
- Queen Margot #1, #2, #3
- Avengers West Coast #53, #61
- House of Mystery #290 (March, 1981)
- Superman #89 (May 1, 1954)
- Rip Hunter ... Time Master #24 (February 1, 1965)
- Look and Learn #34 (September 8, 1962)

=== Film ===
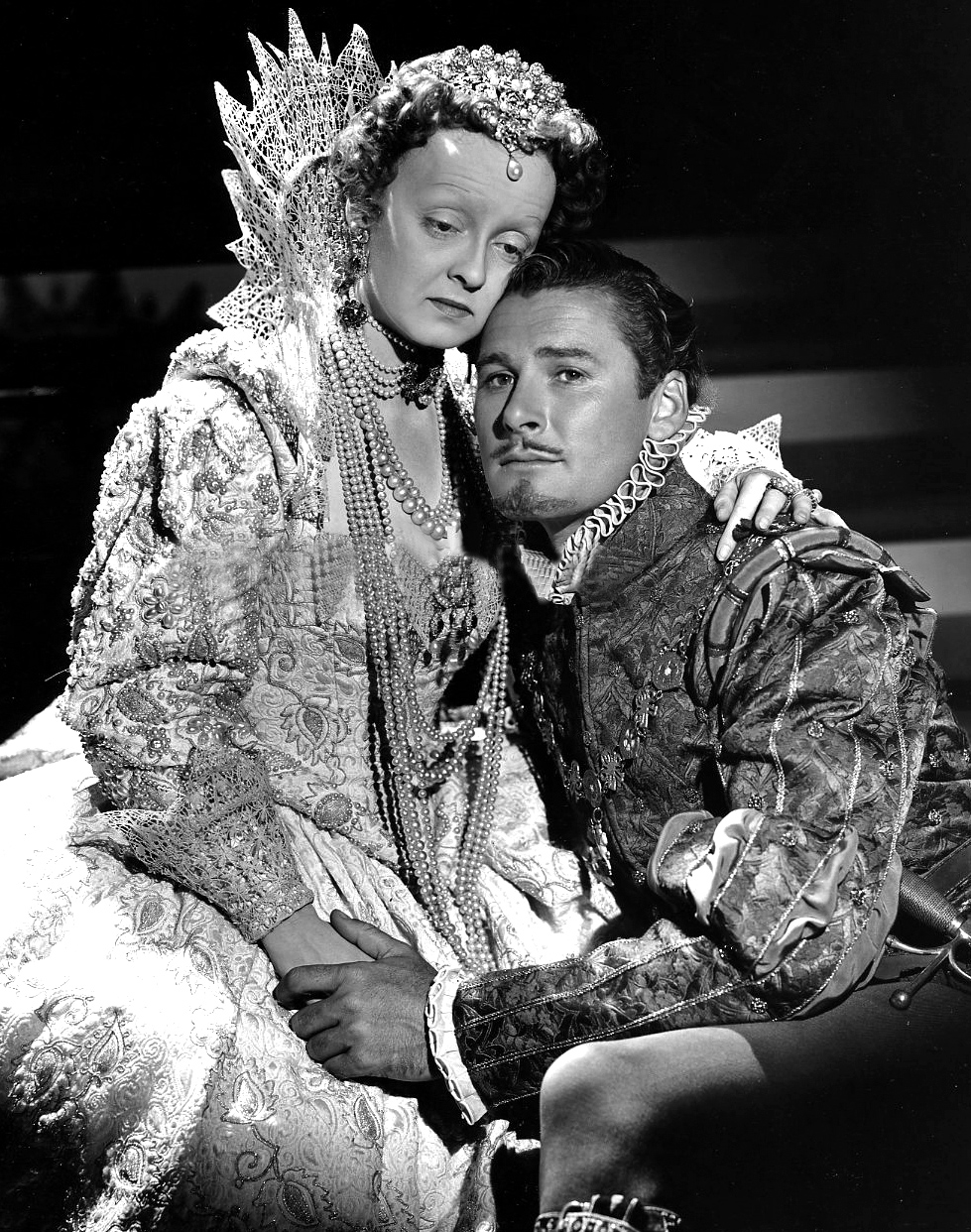
Publicity photo of Bette Davis and Errol Flynn as Elizabeth and Robert Devereux respectively in The Private Lives of Elizabeth and Essex (1939).

In the cinema, Elizabeth has been portrayed by:

- Sarah Bernhardt in the French silent short Les Amours de la reine Élisabeth (1912), dramatising Elizabeth's love affair with the Earl of Essex.
- Gladys Ffolliott in the British silent comedy Old Bill Through the Ages (1924), featuring the character Old Bill created by Bruce Bairnsfather.
- Athene Seyler in Drake of England (1935).
- Florence Eldridge in Mary of Scotland (1936), an adaptation of Maxwell Anderson's play with Katharine Hepburn as Mary, Queen of Scots.
- Gwendolyn Jones in The Prince and the Pauper (1937).
- Yvette Pienne in the French film The Pearls of the Crown (1937).
- Flora Robson in Fire Over England (1937) and The Sea Hawk (1940).
- Bette Davis in The Private Lives of Elizabeth and Essex (1939) and The Virgin Queen (1955).
- Maria Koppenhöfer in the German film Das Herz der Königin (1940), about Mary, Queen of Scots.
- Olga Lindo in the British time travel comedy Time Flies (1944).
- Jean Simmons in Young Bess (1953), about her early years.
- Agnes Moorehead in The Story of Mankind (1957).
- Irene Worth in Seven Seas to Calais (1962).
- Catherine Lacey in The Fighting Prince of Donegal (1966).
- Glenda Jackson in Mary, Queen of Scots (1971), with Vanessa Redgrave as Mary.
- Jenny Runacre in Derek Jarman's film Jubilee (1977).
- Lalla Ward in Crossed Swords (1977), an adaptation of The Prince and the Pauper.
- Quentin Crisp in Orlando (1992).
- Cate Blanchett in Elizabeth (1998), directed by Shekhar Kapur, and its sequel Elizabeth: The Golden Age (2007), for both of which she was nominated for the Academy Award for Best Actress.
- Judi Dench in Shakespeare in Love (1998), for which she won the Academy Award for Best Supporting Actress.
- Vanessa Redgrave and Joely Richardson both play Elizabeth in the film Anonymous (2011).
- Helen McCrory in Bill (2015)
- Margot Robbie in Mary Queen of Scots (2018), with Saoirse Ronan as Mary.
- Kimberly Stockton in Bill & Ted Face the Music (2020)
- Junia Rees in Firebrand (2023)

=== Literature ===
- Elizabeth's own writings, which were considerable, were collected and published by the University of Chicago Press as Elizabeth I: Collected Works.

==== Novels and series ====
- The three-volume 1783-1785 Gothic romance novel, The Recess, by Sophia Lee.
- Elizabeth is a character in the 1821 novel Kenilworth, by Sir Walter Scott.
- The 1855 historical novel set in the Elizabethan Era Westward Ho!, by Charles Kingsley.
- The young Elizabeth is a minor character in Mark Twain's novel The Prince and the Pauper.
- H. C. Bailey wrote The Lonely Queen (1911), a novel revolving around Elizabeth as a young woman.
- "E. Barrington" (L. Adams Beck) wrote Duel of the Queens (1930), revolving around the rivalry between Elizabeth and Mary Queen of Scots.
- Elswyth Thane Beebe wrote The Tudor Wench (1932), a historical novel covering Elizabeth's life up to her coronation.
- Elizabeth Goudge produced Towers in the Mist (1938), a novel about Oxford University which features a visit from Queen Elizabeth.
- Margaret Irwin wrote the Good Queen Bess trilogy based on Elizabeth's youth: Young Bess (1944), Elizabeth, Captive Princess (1950), and Elizabeth and the Prince of Spain (1953).
- Mary M. Luke wrote a definitive Tudor trilogy: Catherine the Queen (1968), A Crown for Elizabeth (1970), and Gloriana: The Years of Elizabeth I (1973), with the latter two books focusing on Elizabeth's youth and reign.
- All the Queen's Men by Evelyn Anthony (1960)
- No Great Magic by Fritz Leiber (1963): this depicted Elizabeth as a series of time-traveling impostors.
- Vivat! Vivat Regina! by Robert Bolt (1970)
- The Queen and the Gypsy by Constance Heaven (1977)
- My Enemy the Queen by Victoria Holt (1978)
- Queen of This Realm by Jean Plaidy (1984)
- Legacy by Susan Kay (1985)
- The Armor of Light by Melissa Scott & Lisa A. Barnett (1988)
- Much Suspected of Me by Maureen Peters (1990) on the early life of Elizabeth I.
- Proud Bess by Maureen Peters (1990) on first years of Elizabeth's reign.
- England's Mistress by Maureen Peters (1991) Elizabeth Tudor has survived uncertainty and danger in order to ascend the throne vacated by the death of her fanatical half-sister Mary. She has drawn about her men such as Leicester and Cecil, her Minister of State. But her throne is menaced from across the border by the Queen of Scots.
- I, Elizabeth by Rosalind Miles (1994).
- To Shield the Queen, a series of eight books featuring Ursula Blanchard, Lady in waiting to Elizabeth, by Fiona Buckley (1997–2006).
- Elizabeth's story is told for children in Elizabeth I: Red Rose of the House of Tudor, a book by Kathryn Lasky in the Royal Diaries series published by Scholastic (1999).
- Author Karen Harper has written a mystery series about Elizabeth. Included in this series are nine fictional novels. They are: The Poyson Garden (2000), The Tidal Poole (2000), The Twylight Tower (2002), The Queene's Cure (2003), The Thorne Maze (2003), The Queene's Christmas (2004), The Fyre Mirror (2006), The Fatal Fashione (2006), and The Hooded Hawke (2007).
- Beware, Princess Elizabeth is a novel for children by Carolyn Meyer (2001).
- Author Robin Maxwell wrote three novels figuring Elizabeth: Virgin: Prelude to the Throne (2001); Elizabeth's story is spliced with her mother's in The Secret Diary of Anne Boleyn. The story of the historic Arthur Dudley, who pretended to be a son of Elizabeth and Lord Robert Dudley, is embellished in The Queen's Bastard (1999).
- Author Philippa Gregory portrayed Elizabeth as a character in five out of her six books on the Tudors. She is seen as a baby and a child in The Other Boleyn Girl (2001), a child in The Boleyn Inheritance (2006), a young woman in The Queen's Fool (2003), a young queen in The Virgin's Lover (2004) and as an older queen in The Other Queen (2008).
- An alternate history novel by Harry Turtledove featuring Elizabeth is entitled Ruled Britannia was published in 2002.
- A historical fantasy of Elizabeth's life, featuring elven guardians, is recounted in This Scepter'd Isle (2004), Ill Met by Moonlight (2005), and By Slanderous Tongues (2007) by Mercedes Lackey and Roberta Gellis.
- Queen Elizabeth I: A Children's Picture Book by Richard Brassey (2005)
- Queen Elizabeth I and Her Conquests by Margret Simpson (2006)
- The 2007 book Innocent Traitor by Alison Weir about Lady Jane Grey features Elizabeth as a young woman.
- The 2008 book The Lady Elizabeth by Alison Weir features Elizabeth as a young girl from the death of her mother to her coronation and her relationships with her half siblings and her father.
- Elizabeth Bear's Promethean Age books Ink & Steel and Hell & Earth are set in the final decade of Elizabeth's reign and feature her prominently.
- The Princeling, Volume 3 of The Morland Dynasty, a series of historical novels by author Cynthia Harrod-Eagles. The fictional Nanette Morland is her servant and mentor, having previously been a close friend, servant and confidante of Elizabeth's mother, Anne Boleyn.
- Virgin and the Crab - Sketches, Fables and Mysteries from the Early Life of John Dee and Elizabeth Tudor, a novel by Robert Parry (2009) speculates on the early relationship between the young Elizabeth and her 'noble intelligencer.'
- The novel The Bones of Avalon (2010) by Phil Rickman describes Elizabeth visiting John Dee. It is also about her entourage and about a plot to undermine her reputation and power in order to prepare to have her eventually replaced by Mary, Queen of Scots. John Dee as the book's hero is assigned to prevent all that.
- The novel Rival to the Queen (2010) by Carolly Erickson is about Elizabeth's rivalry with Lettice Knollys for Robert Dudley's affections.
- Elizabeth I (2011) by Margaret George is a novel that tracks the latter years of Elizabeth's life from 1588 until her death.
- The Tournament (2013) by Matthew Reilly, depicts a fictional visit by a 13-year old Elizabeth to the Ottoman Empire with Roger Ascham. Here Elizabeth witnesses a chess tournament, becomes involved in a murder mystery, and meets Sultan Suleiman the Magnificent.
- A Column of Fire (2017) by Ken Follett is the last of a trilogy of books and sees the main protagonist working for Elizabeth, helping her ascend the throne and keeping her safe throughout her reign.

==== Plays ====
- The birth of Elizabeth is proclaimed and her baptism is shown in scenes of William Shakespeare's play King Henry VIII (First Folio 1623).
- Elizabeth is a principal character in the play Mary Stuart (1800) by Friedrich Schiller .
- Elizabeth is a principal character in The Dark Lady of the Sonnets by George Bernard Shaw (1910).
- Elizabeth is a principal character in the play Elizabeth of England by Ferdinand Bruckner (1930).
- 20th century American Pulitzer Prize-winning playwright Maxwell Anderson dramatized episodes of Elizabeth's life in two of his most popular plays, Elizabeth the Queen (1930), starring Lynn Fontanne, and Mary of Scotland (1933), starring Helen Menken as Elizabeth.
- Elizabeth Rex (2000), by Timothy Findley, starred Diane D'Aquila in 2000 and Stephanie Barton-Farcas in 2008, on Broadway
- Elizabeth appears as a featured character in the stage adaptation of Shakespeare in Love, adapted script by Lee Hall (2014).
- Elizabeth appears as a main character in Rosamund Gravelle's debut play Three Queens, and first played by Eliza Shea, before Elizabeth has ascended to the throne. Set in 1554 the play is about a fictional encounter between Queen Mary I of England, Lady Jane Grey and Princess Elizabeth, brought together by their cousin, Cardinal Reginald Pole, the night before Lady Jane Grey is due to be executed.

==== Poetry ====
- One of Elizabeth's nicknames was "The Faerie Queen", after the poem in her honour by Edmund Spenser.

=== Music ===
- Elizabeth was praised through the music of her court during tournaments, progresses, plays, masques and other court pageantry.

==== Operas and other stage music ====
- Henry Purcell wrote a semi-opera, The Fairy-Queen (1692), an adaptation of Shakespeare's A Midsummer Night's Dream. One of Elizabeth's nicknames was "The Faerie Queen", after the poem in her honour by Edmund Spenser.
- Gioachino Rossini wrote his first Neapolitan opera on the subject of Elizabeth I, Elisabetta, regina d'Inghilterra, in 1814–15, ultimately based on a three-volume Gothic romance novel, The Recess, by Sophia Lee.
- Elizabeth appears in three operas by Gaetano Donizetti, Il castello di Kenilworth (1829) after Walter Scott, Maria Stuarda (1834), based loosely on Schiller's play; and Roberto Devereux (1837) about her affair with the Earl of Essex.
- Elizabeth is a leading character in Ambroise Thomas' opéra comique Le songe d'une nuit d'été (1850)
- Arthur Sullivan wrote The Masque at Kenilworth, depicting Robert Dudley's elaborate proposal to Elizabeth
- Benjamin Britten wrote an opera, Gloriana, about the relationship between Elizabeth and Essex, composed for the 1953 coronation of Elizabeth II.
- In the musical The Pirate Queen, composed by Claude-Michel Schönberg, an Irish chieftain, Gráinne O'Malley, challenges Elizabeth I's takeover of Ireland.

=== Radio/audio dramas ===
- Judith Anderson played Elizabeth in the March 10, 1937 Lux Radio Theatre adaptation of the film Mary of Scotland, with Joan Crawford as Mary Stuart and Franchot Tone as Bothwell.
- On December 17, 1944, the CBS Radio series Matinee Theater broadcast an adaptation of Maxwell Anderson's play Elizabeth the Queen with Judith Evelyn as Elizabeth and Victor Jory.
- Another adaptation of Elizabeth the Queen was broadcast on the Theatre Guild on the Air on December 2, 1945, starring Lynn Fontanne as Elizabeth.
- Another version of the Mary of Scotland play was broadcast on the Theatre Guild on the Air on April 28, 1946, starring Helen Menken as Elizabeth and Helen Hayes as Mary Stuart (both of whom had originally played their roles on Broadway).
- On June 10, 1947, the radio series Favorite Story broadcast "Mary Queen of Scots", the "favorite story" of Bing Crosby, with Benita Hume as Elizabeth and Edna Best as Mary Stuart.
- Another adaptation of the Anderson play Elizabeth the Queen was broadcast on the NBC radio series Best Plays on November 9, 1952, with Eva Le Gallienne as Elizabeth.
- On October 11, 1953, the NBC radio series Stroke of Fate broadcast "Queen Elizabeth I" with Judith Evelyn as Elizabeth, a conjecture of what would have happened if the Earl of Essex's plot to depose Elizabeth had succeeded.
- In 2001, CBC Radio broadcast as part of The CBC Stratford Festival Reading Series an adaptation of Timothy Findley's play Elizabeth Rex with Diane D'Aquila re-creating her stage role as Elizabeth; this production was later released on CD by CBC Audio (ISBN 978-0660185354).
- A Storm of Angels (2005), a Doctor Who audio drama, featured Kate Brown as the Gloriana of a parallel history.
- A radio adaptation of Liz Lochhead's play Mary Queen of Scots Got Her Head Chopped Off was broadcast on BBC Radio 4 on 11 February 2011, with Siobhan Redmond as Elizabeth, Gerda Stevenson as Mary and Myra McFadyen as Corbie.
- Alexandre Mathe played Elizabeth in a 2012 BBC Radio 3 adaptation by David Harrower of Friedrich Schiller's play Mary Stuart.

=== Television ===
On television, Elizabeth has been portrayed by:

- Dorothy Black in the BBC drama The Dark Lady of the Sonnets (1946)
- Mildred Natwick in Mary of Scotland (1951), an adaptation of Maxwell Anderson's play in the American Pulitzer Prize Playhouse series
- Maxine Audley in the BBC series Kenilworth (1957), an adaptation of Scott's novel
- Peggy Thorpe-Bates in the BBC series Queen's Champion (1958)
- Mecha Ortiz in the Argentinian drama Elizabeth Is Dead (1960), about Elizabeth's last hours
- Jean Kent in the British adventure series Sir Francis Drake (1961)
- Katya Douglas in The Prince and the Pauper (1962), part of the American TV series Disneyland
- Vivienne Bennett in "The Executioners" episode of the BBC sci-fi series Doctor Who (1965). Subsequently, Angela Pleasence plays her in the episode "The Shakespeare Code" (2007), and Joanna Page plays a younger version in the later episode "The Day of the Doctor" (2013).
- Susan Engel in the BBC series The Queen's Traitor (1967), about the Ridolfi plot
- Judith Anderson in Elizabeth the Queen (1968), an adaptation of Maxwell Anderson's play in the American series Hallmark Hall of Fame for which she was nominated for an Emmy Award
- Gemma Jones in the BBC series Kenilworth (1968), another adaptation of Scott's novel
- Glenda Jackson in the BBC serial drama Elizabeth R (1971), for which she won two Emmy Awards
- Graham Chapman in Episode 29 of the BBC series Monty Python's Flying Circus, in a spoof of Elizabeth R titled "Erizabeth L" (1972)
- Hattie Jacques in the "Orgy and Bess" episode of the British comedy series Carry On Laughing (1975)
- Patience Collier in the ATV drama series Life of Shakespeare (1978)
- Charlotte Cornwell in the British drama Drake's Venture (1980), with John Thaw as Francis Drake
- Rosalind Plowright in a BBC adaptation of Donizetti's opera Mary Stuart (1982)
- Sarah Walker in an adaptation of Britten's opera Gloriana (1984)
- Miranda Richardson in the BBC comedy series Blackadder II (1986), Blackadder's Christmas Carol (1988) and the Millennium episode Blackadder: Back & Forth (2000), where she is portrayed as childish and spoiled. In the last episode of Blackadder II the entire supporting cast is killed by Prince Ludwig the Indestructible, who impersonates her.
- Helen Baxendale in the "An Evil Business" episode of the Granada Television drama documentary series In Suspicious Circumstances (1996), about the death of Amy Robsart
- Josephine Barstow in another adaptation of Britten's opera Gloriana (2000)
- Tamara Hope as a young Elizabeth in Elizabeth I: Red Rose of the House of Tudor (2000), the HBO adaptation of The Royal Diaries novel of the same name.
- Margot Kidder in the "Her Grace Under Pressure" episode of the American science fiction series Mentors (2001)
- Diane D'Aquila in the 2003 CBC Television production of Timothy Findley's play Elizabeth Rex.
- Lorna Lacey in the Granada Television serial Henry VIII (2003)
- Catherine McCormack in the BBC series Gunpowder, Treason & Plot (2004)
- Anne-Marie Duff in the BBC series The Virgin Queen (2005)
- Helen Mirren in the two-part w34 Elizabeth I (2005), for which she won an Emmy Award
- Kate Duggan (Series 2) and Claire McCauley (Series 3) in the Showtime series The Tudors (2008) as a child. Laoise Murray in Series 4 of The Tudors (2010) as a teenager.
- Martha Howe-Douglas, Louise Ford and Harrie Hayes in the educational comedy sketch show Horrible Histories.
- Rachel Skarsten in seasons two through four of The CW drama Reign (2015).
- Emma Thompson in the BBC sitcom Upstart Crow's Christmas Special (2017).
- Julie Neubert in the BBC documentary Elizabeth I's Secret Agents (2017).
- Rebecca Scott in Queens: The Virgin and the Martyr
- Rosa Blake in the "Bloody Mary Hour" (2020) episode of El ministerio del tiempo, where the main plot revolves around the Ministry trying to prevent her from being murdered before ever being crowned queen.
- Barbara Marten in "Episodes One and Nine, Season Three" of the Sky One drama A Discovery of Witches, where the lead male is a vampire who acts as a spy and advisor to her, helping carry out witch hunts (2021).
- Alicia von Rittberg plays a teenage Elizabeth in Starz’s Becoming Elizabeth (2022).
- Cheddar Gorgeous portrayed Elizabeth I during the Snatch Game episode of series 4 of RuPaul's Drag Race UK (2022)
- Minnie Driver in the second season of The Serpent Queen (2024)
- Abbie Hern portraying Elizabeth as "Bess" in My Lady Jane (2024)

=== Documentaries ===
- Imogen Slaughter in the drama documentary Elizabeth (2000) with David Starkey, in which Karen Archer played her as an older woman and Saskia Blackwell as a child.
- Anita Dobson in the BBC three part docudrama series Armada: 12 Days to Save England (2015).
- Helen Bradbury in 2016 BBC documentary Bloody Queens: Elizabeth and Mary.
- Lily Cole in the Channel 5 docudrama series Elizabeth I (2017). Elizabeth is also portrayed at various ages in the series by actresses Summer Rose Alison, Sheya McAllister, and Felicity Dean.

=== Video games ===
- In the popular real time strategy video game Age of Empires III, Queen Elizabeth is the AI personality for the British civilization.
- The queen of the video game Anno 1701 has the same features and bears the same style dress to that of Queen Elizabeth I.
- In Ubisoft's Assassin's Creed series, Queen Elizabeth held one of the Golden Apple variety of the pieces of Eden during her reign.
- Elizabeth has been the leader of the English civilization in many games of Sid Meier's Civilization series; she is joined by Queen Victoria in Civilization IV and Sir Winston Churchill in the Warlords expansion to that game.
- In the strategy games Europa Universalis and Europa Universalis II, Queen Elizabeth appears, as with all other monarchs of the realm, at her historical time. Her diplomatic, administrative and military skills are remarkable.
- In Uncharted 3: Drake's Deception, modern day adventurer Nathan Drake discovers that Queen Elizabeth had sent explorer Sir Francis Drake to the lost city of Ubar to discover the supernatural properties of the Djinn, which would give her the opportunity to expand her empire and enslave the world.
- She can be seen briefly in the MMORPG game Uncharted Waters Online in the storyline event of England.

== Misattributions ==
- RMS Queen Elizabeth was not named after her but in honour of Queen Elizabeth The Queen Mother (1900-2002).

== See also ==
- Elizabeth I of England
- Portraiture of Elizabeth I of England
- Artists of the Tudor court
