= The Other Boleyn Girl (disambiguation) =

The Other Boleyn Girl is a historical fiction novel by Philippa Gregory.

The Other Boleyn Girl may also refer to:

- The Other Boleyn Girl (2003 film), television drama produced by the BBC
- The Other Boleyn Girl (2008 film), theatrically released drama produced by BBC Films
