= Cultural depictions of Anne Boleyn =

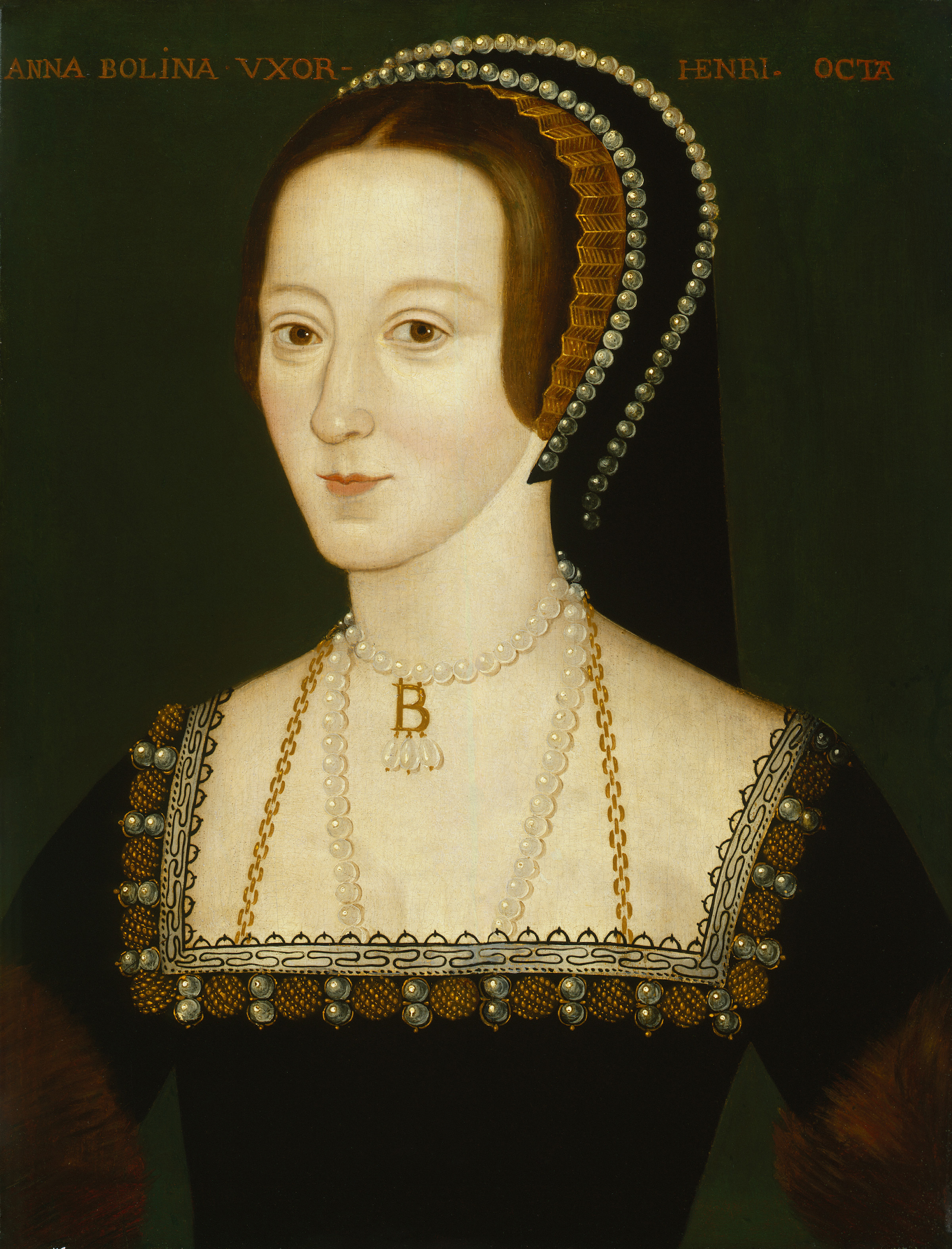
Anne Boleyn

Anne Boleyn, who was the second wife of King Henry VIII of England, Queen of England from 1533 until she was beheaded in 1536 for treason (consisting of alleged adultery, including alleged incest with her brother George), has inspired or been mentioned in many artistic and cultural works. The following lists cover various media, enduring works of high art, and recent representations in popular culture, film and fiction. The entries represent portrayals that a reader has a reasonable chance of encountering, rather than a complete catalogue.

Anne Boleyn, as the second wife of Henry VIII, was the mother of Elizabeth I. She has been called "the most influential and important queen consort England has ever had", as she provided the occasion for Henry VIII to annul his marriage to Catherine of Aragon and declare the English church's independence from the Catholic Church.

== Portrayals ==
A common view in the 18th and 19th centuries was the image of Anne as a romantic victim; a strong-willed and beautiful woman who was destroyed by her husband, who was presented as a brutal tyrant by most popular historians. A 19th-century biography of Anne by Elizabeth Benger was particularly full of praise for Anne, as was one entitled Star of the Court by Selina Bunbury. Famous writers and novelists who subscribed to this view of Anne (which persisted into the 20th century) included Jane Austen, Agnes Strickland, Jean Plaidy and playwright Maxwell Anderson. The play and Oscar-winning movie Anne of the Thousand Days is inspired by this interpretation of Anne's life, as is Donizetti's opera Anna Bolena (from 1830). Various popular novels have also adopted this sympathetic idea of Anne Boleyn.

In the latter half of the 20th century, academic historians who were determined to study Henry VIII's government and court as serious political and cultural institutions argued that Anne Boleyn was one of the most ambitious, intelligent and important queens in European history. They researched her political sympathies, patronage network and influence over foreign policy and religious affairs. This led to several academic studies of her life, the most famous of which are the first and second editions of the comprehensive biography written by the British historian Eric Ives. The second edition, influenced by fellow historian David Starkey's focus on a Reformist sermon commissioned by Anne, posits that Anne may have had an authentic spiritual mission and may have been as much an agent as a catalyst for the British Reformation. They both suggest that it may have been her particular Reformist agenda (and not simply her inability to produce a male heir) that put her at odds with Cromwell and led to her execution. David Starkey, the historian who hosted a television program about all six of the wives, keenly promotes this particularly attractive view of Anne. Combined with the intellectual force of feminism, which has interpreted Anne Boleyn in a highly favourable light, most academic histories write about her with respect and sympathy. Authors David Loades, John Guy, and Diarmaid MacCulloch have also published works that were sympathetic or admiring on the subject. Popular biographies by Joanna Denny and feminist Karen Lindsey have taken similar approaches, both being highly favourable to Anne. Lindsey, in Divorced, Beheaded, Survived, makes the case that Henry's relentless pursuit of Anne, far from being part of a manipulative flirtation which she enjoyed, was a form of royal harassment from which Anne's delaying tactics were the closest she dared come to escape. This is consistent with Henry's "courtships" of Catherine Howard and Catherine Parr, which have traditionally been seen as not wholly consensual on their part.

The work of American academic Retha Warnicke focuses on the unmitigated gender prejudices of the early 16th century and how they formed Anne into being first a pawn and ultimately a willingly venal and unscrupulous agent for her own and her family's advancement. Warnicke's Anne is controversial, and some of her hypotheses (that Anne's brother was part of a clandestine homosexual clique at Court; that Anne would have stopped at nothing, including using her brother's own seed, to birth a male heir for the king) are not supported by the majority of scholars, however compellingly lurid they may be. Other notably unattractive portraits come from the work of British historian Alison Weir and novelist Philippa Gregory. In her best-seller The Other Boleyn Girl, Gregory puts Anne as the hard-hearted villain in a story with Anne's sister Mary Boleyn as its sadder but wiser heroine. (In her "author's note" to the book, Gregory said her novel's conclusion was based upon Warnicke's findings in The Rise and Fall of Anne Boleyn, but Warnicke has publicly distanced herself from the novel and its presentation of the Boleyns).

There have been various treatments of her life by popular historians such as Marie Louise Bruce, Hester W. Chapman, Norah Lofts, Carolly Erickson, Amy Licence, Alison Weir, Lady Antonia Fraser and Joanna Denny. In film, television and the performing arts, she has been played by a variety of well-known actresses and sopranos, including Clara Kimball Young, Merle Oberon, Joyce Redman, Geneviève Bujold (Oscar-nominated), Maria Callas, Beverly Sills, Dame Dorothy Tutin, Dame Joan Sutherland, Charlotte Rampling, Vanessa Redgrave, Helena Bonham Carter, Jodhi May, Natalie Portman, Natalie Dormer and Claire Foy.

== Film, stage, and television portrayals ==
=== Film ===
- Anne Boleyn was portrayed by Clara Kimball Young in a 1912 short film about Cardinal Wolsey.
- She was portrayed by Henny Porten in the 1920 film Anna Boleyn, directed by the young Ernst Lubitsch.
- She was portrayed by Merle Oberon in the 1933 film The Private Life of Henry VIII which won an Oscar for Charles Laughton's portrayal of Henry.
- She was portrayed by Barbara Shaw in 1937 French comedy The Pearls of the Crown.
- Elaine Stewart played Anne Boleyn in the 1953 film Young Bess, starring Jean Simmons, Deborah Kerr and Charles Laughton.
- Vanessa Redgrave played Anne in the 1966 film A Man for All Seasons.
- Geneviève Bujold won a Golden Globe Award, and was nominated for an Oscar, for her portrayal of Anne in the 1969 film Anne of the Thousand Days.
- Natalie Portman portrayed Anne in the film The Other Boleyn Girl in 2008.
- Amy Manson portrays Anne in dream sequences in the 2021 film Spencer.

=== TV ===
- Dorothy Tutin was nominated for a BAFTA TV Award for her role as Anne in the 1970 drama serial The Six Wives of Henry VIII. That drama was compressed into a 1972 film version entitled Henry VIII and His Six Wives, starring Charlotte Rampling as Anne
- Jodhi May portrayed Anne in the 2003 British TV movie version of the novel The Other Boleyn Girl.
- Helena Bonham Carter portrayed Anne in the 2003 TV movie Henry VIII, later released as a DVD (Ray Winstone portrayed Henry).
- Natalie Dormer portrayed Anne in the Showtime series The Tudors in seasons 1 and 2 (2007 and 2008); and season 4 (brief cameo, 2010). She was critically praised for her performance, and won two Gemini Awards.
- Claire Foy portrayed Anne in the 2015 BBC Two television series Wolf Hall.
- In 2017, an episode of Horrible Histories featured Gemma Whelan, portraying Anne Boleyn.
- Alice Nokes portrayed Anne Boleyn in the 2020 Starz drama The Spanish Princess.
- Jodie Turner-Smith portrayed Anne in the 2021 Anne Boleyn miniseries.
- Amy James-Kelly portrayed Anne Boleyn in the 2022 Netflix show Blood, Sex and Royalty.

=== Documentaries ===
- Julia Marsen portrayed Anne in historian David Starkey's 2001 documentary TV series, The Six Wives of Henry VIII.
- Iona Flora portrayed Anne in episode the "Madness of Henry VIII" of the 2006 documentary series Icons Of Power.
- Sophie Hunter portrayed Anne in historian David Starkey's 2009 documentary Henry VIII: Mind of a Tyrant.
- Tara Breathnach portrayed Anne in 2013 BBC documentary The Last Days of Anne Boleyn.
- Emma Connell portrayed Anne in 2014 documentaty Henry and Anne: The Lovers Who Changed History with Dr. Suzannah Lipscomb and in 2020 documentary The Fall of Anne Boleyn with Tracy Borman.
- Harriet Green portrayed Anne in 2015 documentary Inside the Court of Henry VIII with Tracy Borman and Chris Skidmore and in 2016 documentary series Henry VIII and His Six Wives with Dr. Suzannah Lipscomb and Dan Jones.
- In 2016, Claire Cooper portrayed Anne in the documentary series Six Wives with Lucy Worsley
- Anastasia Drew portrayed Anne in 2016-2019 documentaty series The Private Lives of the Tudors with Tracy Borman.
- Amelia Strohm portrayed Anne in 2020 documentary Henry VIII: Man, Monarch, Monster.
- Rafaëlle Cohen portrayed Anne in 2021 documentary The Boleyns: A Scandalous Family.

=== Stage ===
- Joyce Redman played Anne on Broadway in 1949 opposite Rex Harrison's Tony Award-winning portrayal of Henry in Maxwell Anderson's play Anne of the Thousand Days
- Howard Brenton's 2010 play Anne Boleyn (Shakespeare's Globe) was centered on Anne's life.
- Maria Callas, Leyla Gencer, Beverly Sills, Joan Sutherland, Montserrat Caballé, Edita Gruberová, Anna Netrebko, Sondra Radvanovsky, and Angela Meade all portrayed Anne Boleyn onstage and/or in recordings of the Donizetti opera Anna Bolena.
- Lydia Leonard portrayed Anne in the Royal Shakespeare Company's production of Wolf Hall Parts One & Two both on Broadway and in London's West End.
- From 2017 to the present, Anne was portrayed by Christina Modestou, Millie O'Connell, and Courtney Bowman in London, Andrea Macasaet in the US, Maddison Bulleyment on the UK tour, Hazel Karooma-Brooker and Kelly Sweeney for the Norwegian Cruise Line productions, and Kala Gare in Australia for the stage production of Six.

== In popular culture ==
- Playing on claims she was a witch, her portrait can be seen hanging along the staircases at Hogwarts in Harry Potter and the Philosopher's Stone.
- In a dream sequence at the start of Kevin & Perry Go Large, the teenage character Kevin is reading a book on Anne Boleyn for his homework, but instead his mind wanders to a sexual fantasy in which Anne (played by Natasha Little and speaking in 20th-century teenage slang) convinces her executioner (Kevin) that to kill her would be a waste of her beautiful body and in return gives him oral sex.

=== Theatre ===
- William Shakespeare's The Winter's Tale (1610–11) is believed by some scholars to be an allegory for Anne's downfall.
- Anne appears (spelled Anne Bullen) in William Shakespeare and John Fletcher's play The Famous History of the Life of King Henry VIII (1613?). It depicts her wooing by Henry and the events leading up to the birth of the Princess Elizabeth.
- Anna Elizabeth Dickinson wrote and starred in The Crown of Thorns in 1876.
- The Tragedy of Anne Boleyn, a 1901 play by Elizabeth Wells Gallup which she claimed to have recovered via a biliteral cipher.
- Anne Boleyn: or, The queen of May – A Play in Four Acts (1921), by W. S. Pakenham-Walsh
- Anne of the Thousand Days (1948) by Maxwell Anderson.
- Anne Boleyn is the central character in The Chamber of Beheaded Queens, a one-act play written by KT Parker and staged by Kate O'Leary as part of Liverpool's Page To Stage Festival, 3–17 April 2016
- Anne Boleyn, a 2010 play by Howard Brenton.
- Six, by Toby Marlow and Lucy Moss, a musical about the six wives of Henry VIII portrayed as a modern pop girl group that debuted in 2017.

=== Opera ===
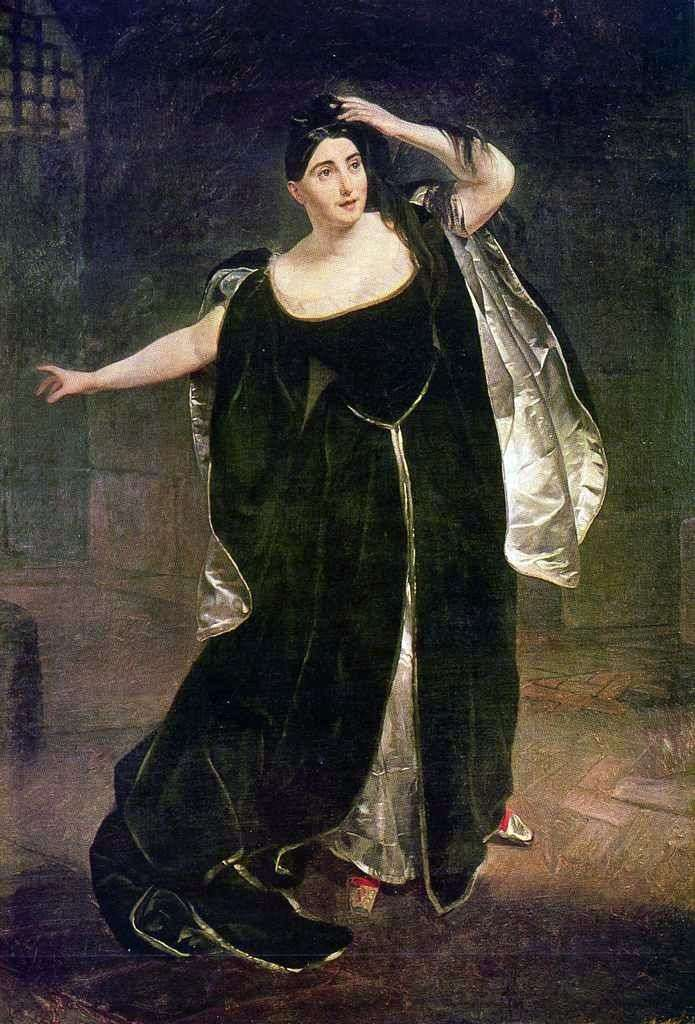
Giuditta Pasta in Anna Bolena

- Anna Bolena, a tragic opera premiered in 1830; music by Gaetano Donizetti and libretto by Felice Romani.

=== In Literature ===
- Lydia Sigourney writes of her fate in her 1827 poem, Anna Boleyn..
- Letitia Elizabeth Landon published her short Two Scenes in the Life of Anne Boleyn. in The Cabinet of Modern Art, and Literary Souvenir, 1837.

=== Books ===
- She was the main subject of investigation in The Creation of Anne Boleyn: A New Look at England's Most Notorious Queen by Susan Bordo (2013).
- She appears in Bring Me the Head of Anne Boleyn by Kristine Kathryn Rusch (2012).
- She was a central character in Wolf Hall and Bring up the Bodies by Hilary Mantel (2009) ISBN 0-00-723018-4
- She was the main character in The Secret Diary of Anne Boleyn (1997) and Mademoiselle Boleyn (2007), both by Robin Maxwell
- She was the main character in A Lady Raised High by Laurien Gardner (2006) ISBN 0-515-14089-9.
- She was the main character in The Queen of Subtleties by Suzannah Dunn (2004) ISBN 0-06-059157-9.
- She was the main character in Doomed Queen Anne by Caroline Meyer (2002) ISBN 0-15-216523-1.
- She was a central character in The Other Boleyn Girl by Philippa Gregory (2001) ISBN 0-7432-2744-1.
- She was the main character in Incredible Fierce Desire (1988) by Maureen Peters.
- She was the main character in Blood Royal by Mollie Hardwick (1988) ISBN 0-312-02548-3.
- She was the main character in The Lady in the Tower by Jean Plaidy (1986).
- Anne is given a sympathetic portrayal in The Dark Rose (1981), Volume 2 in The Morland Dynasty, a series of historical novels by author Cynthia Harrod-Eagles.
- She was the main character in Dark Eyed Queen by Lozania Prole (1976).
- She was the main character in Anne, Rose of Hever (1969) by Maureen Peters.
- She was the main character in A Tudor Story: The Return of Anne Boleyn by W. S. Pakenham-Walsh (1963) ISBN 978-0-227-67678-3
- She was the main character in The Concubine by Norah Lofts (1963) ISBN 0-7524-3943-X.
- She was a character in The King's Secret Matter by Jean Plaidy (1962).
- She was the main character in Anne Boleyn by Evelyn Anthony (1957).
- Murder Most Royal by Jean Plaidy (1949) ISBN 1-4000-8249-8.
- She was the main character in Queen Anne Boleyn by Francis Hackett (1939).
- She appears in The House of Arden by E. Nesbit (1908).
- She is the main character in Jean Bruller (Vercors) 1985 book Anne Boleyn (originally written in French), where she is presented as a far-sighted English patriot, who strove to make England strong and independent by ending its dependence on the Catholic Church and building up its navy, weak at the start of Henry VIII's reign.
- She is the main character in Nancy Kress' science fiction story "And Wild For To Hold", where she is kidnapped by time travelers and brought to a future society, in which she quickly learns the ropes and engages in major political intrigue.
- She is the main character in "The Most Happy" by Holly Eloise Walters.(2019) It is told from her childhood to her death.
- She is the main character in the "Above all others, The Lady Anne" series, by Gemma Lawrence.(2020)

=== Music and song ===
- Anne Boleyn is referenced in Roger Waters' song "Watching TV" on his "Amused To Death" album within the lyrics, "...And she is different from Cro-Magnon man/She's different from Anne Boleyn/She's different from the Rosenbergs/And from the unknown Jew/She's different from the unknown Nicaraguan/Half super-star, half victim/She's a Victor Star, conceptually new/And she is different from the Dodo, and from the Kankabono, she's different from the Aztec's and from the Cherokee/She's everybody's sister, she's symbolic of our failure, she's the one in 50 million who can help us to be free... Because she died on T.V. ...And I grieve for my sister!"
- Anne Boleyn is the subject of Gaetano Donizettî's 1830 opera "Anna Bolena".
- Anne is referenced in Tori Amos' song "Talula" on her Boys for Pele album with the lyrics, "Ran into the henchman who severed Anne Boleyn/He did it right quickly, a merciful man/She said 1+1 is 2, but Henry said that it was 3." Amos also says in her interview on Fade to Red that her song "Crucify" from her album Little Earthquakes was inspired by Anne Boleyn.
- She is also referenced in a song titled "Old Age", written by Courtney Love and performed by her band Hole: "Someone please tell Anne Boleyn/Chokers are back in again." The song appeared on their outtakes album, My Body, the Hand Grenade, in which Anne was also featured in the artwork. She also appears, with a cutout of her upper chest showing her "B" necklace, on the back cover of Hole's album Nobody's Daughter, released 27 April 2010.
- The song "Transylvania" by McFly mentions Anne Boleyn and is portrayed by Dougie Poynter in the music video.
- The ghost of Anne haunting the Tower of London is the subject of the comically macabre song "With Her Head Tucked Underneath Her Arm", originally performed by Stanley Holloway and later recorded by The Kingston Trio.
- In his 1973 album The Six Wives of Henry VIII, Rick Wakeman titled the fifth track "Anne Boleyn".
- The Dutch symphonic rock band Kayak issued a single called "Anne", about Anne Boleyn, from their album Periscope Life (1980).
- Anne is referenced in the Cat Stevens song "Ghost Town", on the 1974 Stevens' album Buddha and the Chocolate Box.
- Anne is referenced in the song "Find the Lady" from Edward Ka-Spel's solo album Laugh, China Doll in the line "Anne Boleyn is shouting Boo! (Because a ghost cannot applaud)".
- "Death (Rock Me to Sleep)", based on a poem said to have been written by Anne Boleyn, and set to a tune by Lucy Ward, appears on Lucy Ward's 2011 album Adelphi Has to Fly.
- Anne Boleyn is included in the lyrics of the Blues Traveler song "Hook".
- The Drowsy Chaperone, a musical, refers to her in the song "Love is Always Lovely in the End". The lyric: "Anne Boleyn lost her head!"
- YouTube singer named Karliene made an album dedicated to Anne Boleyn, called The Ballad of Anne Boleyn.
- The song "Anna" from the EP Cloud Waves by Norwegian rock band Nine Eyes is written about Anne Boleyn.
- The song "Deadcrush" by English musicians alt-J is in written part about Anne Boleyn, referring to her as "Anna Bolina".
- The first chapter of "ANN: A Progressive Metal Trilogy" by Dutch progressive metal band Ex Libris covers the life and death of Anne Boleyn in three tracks: "The Courtship", "The Miscarriage", and "The Beheading".

=== Television ===
- The headless doll owned by Morticia Addams in The Addams Family is named Anne Boleyn; Wednesday Addams's doll is named Marie Antoinette.
- Lindsey Naegle appears as Boleyn, in an episode of The Simpsons, "Margical History Tour".
- In Ugly Betty, Betty Suarez wears a replica of Anne Boleyn's necklace.
- In the second-season episode of the NBC series The Office entitled "Take Your Daughter to Work Day", Dwight serenades the visiting children on the recorder, and says, "That was 'Greensleeves,' a traditional English ballad about the beheaded Anne Boleyn."
- In an episode of the UK version of The Office Anne Boleyn is referenced as Tim Canterbury talks about Slough's nightlife. Notably a themed nightclub called Henry the Eighth's which features an "Anne Boleyn (Bowling) Alley"
- In Chilling Adventures of Sabrina, main character Sabrina Spellman refers to Anne Boleyn as part of an exorcism ritual where she has to call the names of famous historical fallen witches in order to perform the exorcism.
- Anne Boleyn is a British miniseries set in Anne's final five months.
- Blair Waldorf, in Season 2 Episode 25 of Gossip Girl, says "...You need to be cold to be queen. Anne Boleyn thought only with her heart, and she got her head chopped off..." to Jenny Humphrey when giving advice on how to be the Queen Bee of Constance Billard.
- Drag queen Tia Kofi portrayed Anne Boleyn in the Snatch Game episode of RuPaul's Drag Race: UK vs the World Series 2, ultimately winning the challenge. Other queens who paid homage to Anne Boleyn are Bimini Bon-Boulash in the promo shoot for RuPaul's Drag Race UK Series 2, Dakota Schiffer during the Series 4 premiere episode runway (as Anne Boleyn from Horrible Histories) and Plasma in The Mother of All Balls runway in Season 16 of the american series.

=== Podcast ===
- In an episode of The Family Histories Podcast, host Andrew Martin unexpectedly meets Anne when his time machine malfunctions and sends him back in time. Anne calls for her guards. In the following episode, having returned to the present day, he explains that he'd "spent six weeks trying to convince Anne Boleyn not to send [him] to the block", but adds that he "may have taught her how to make Margaritas, and convinced her to reduce the Royal Scarf and Necklace budget" - a nod to her eventual fate.
