= Robin Maxwell =

Robin Maxwell may refer to:

- Robin Maxwell (author) (born 1948), American author of historical fiction
- Robin Maxwell-Hyslop (1931–2010), British Conservative Politician
- Robin Maxwell, fictional character in the science fiction series V
