= Psalter of Henry VIII =

16th-century illuminated psalter

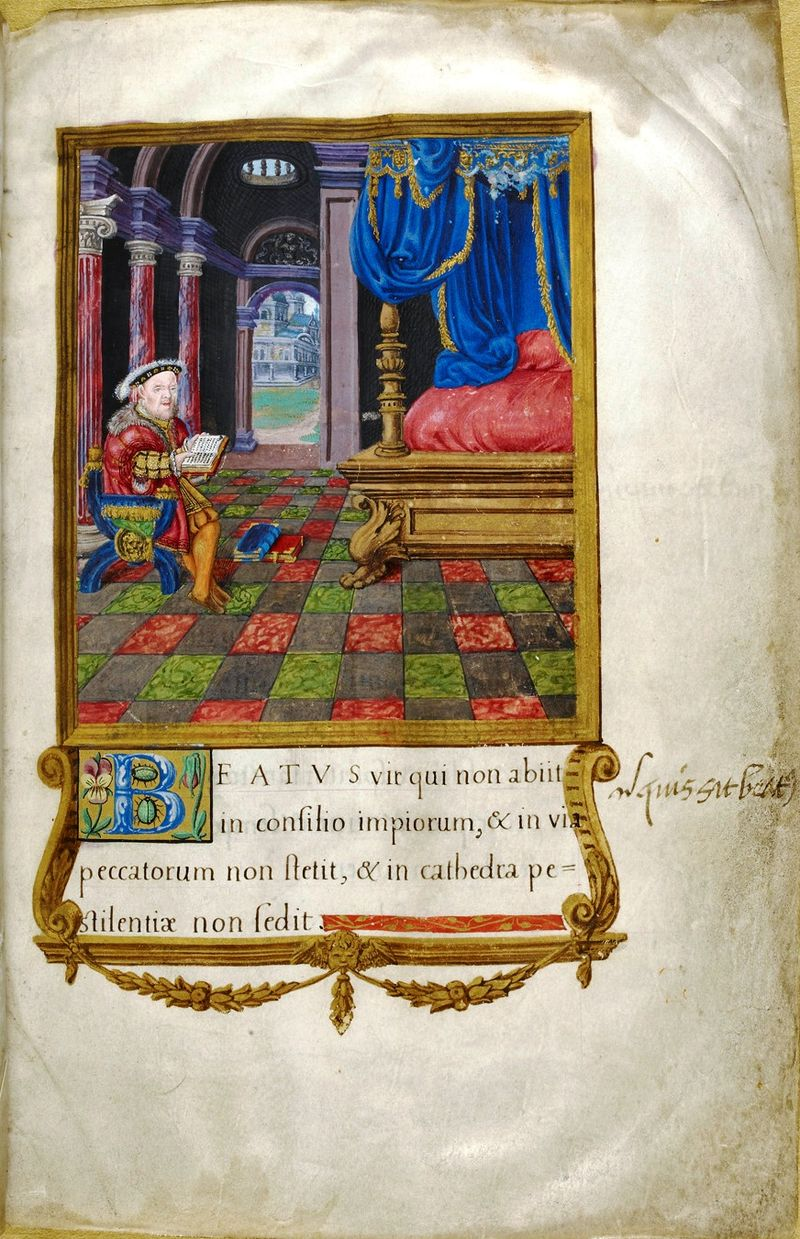
Henry shown reading

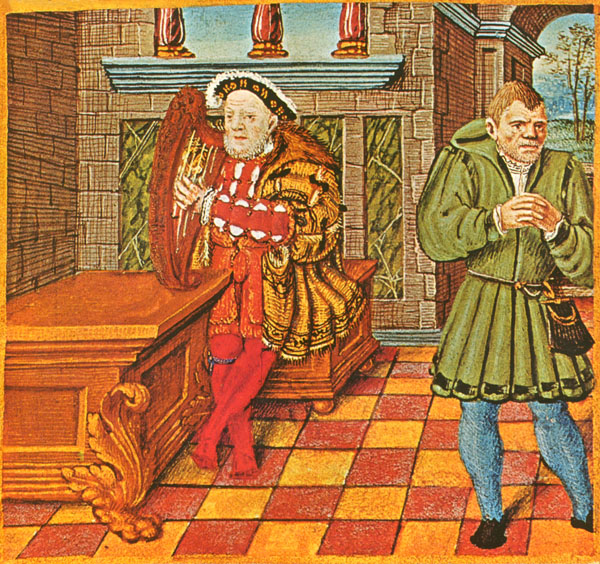
Henry and his jester Will Sommers

The Psalter of Henry VIII is a 16th-century illuminated psalter that belonged to Henry VIII of England. It is now in the British Library as Royal MS 2 A xvi. The King commissioned the book in the early 1540s from the French illuminator Jean Mallard, who had at one time worked for Francis I of France. Mallard also wrote the dedicatory letter that precedes the text. The psalter contains eight miniatures, amongst them scenes of Henry playing the harp with his jester Will Sommers in attendance, and of the king reading in his bedroom. Two scenes show Henry as King David: in one killing Goliath, in the other in the role of a penitent. The book is written in Latin, and has marginal annotations made by Henry himself.

Henry's Psalter can be viewed – the full 1540 book, complete with Henry's own handwritten notes in the margins at the British Library's Virtual Books website.
