= Jane Foole =

English court fool

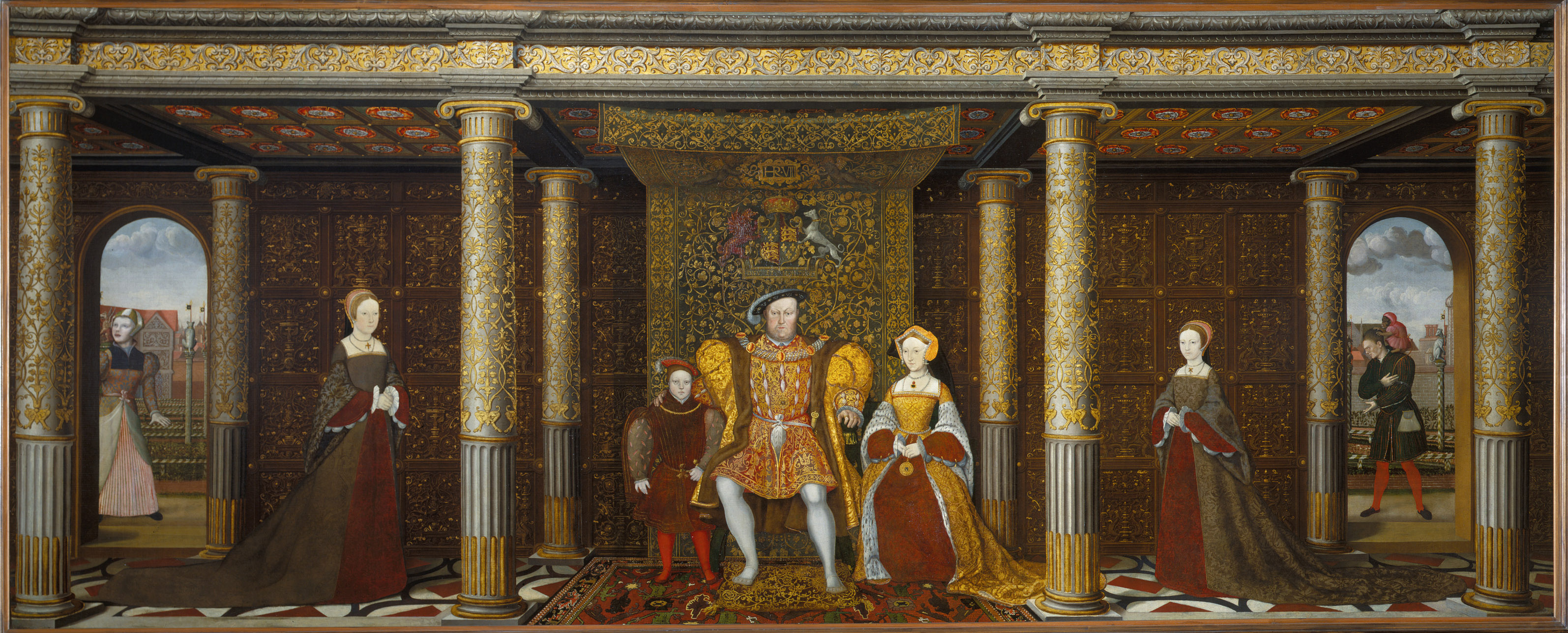
Henry the Eighth and His Family (1545); the man at the far-right background is jester Will Somers, and it has been suggested that the woman at the far left is Jane Foole.

Jane Foole, also known as Jane The Foole, Jane, The Queen's Fool, "Jeanne le Fol" or "Jane Hir Fole" (fl. 1537–1558), was an English court fool (distinct from a jester). She was the fool of queens Catherine Parr and Mary I, and possibly also of Anne Boleyn.

Today, entertainers sometimes perform as "Jane" in Renaissance-themed entertainments such as Renaissance faires.

== Life ==
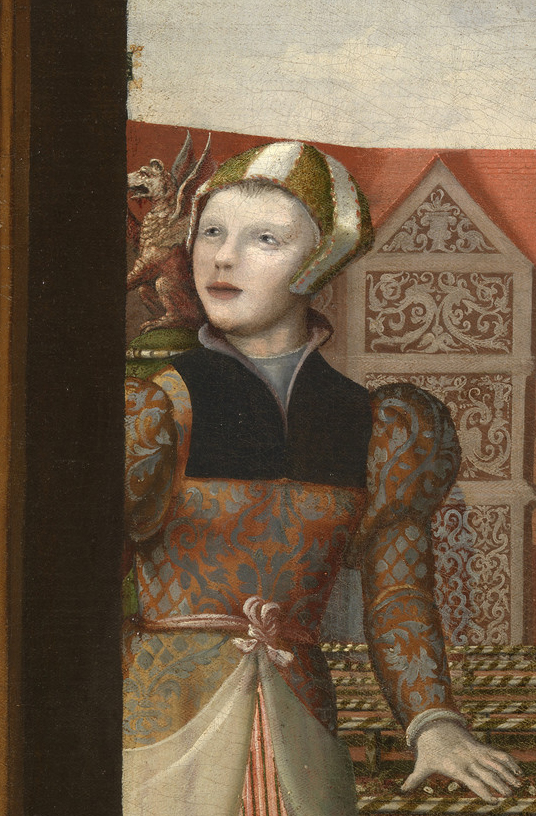
A closer image of a woman suggested to be Jane the Foole

=== Personal life ===
Jane's full name, birth year, and background are unknown. Beden the Fool also appears in related notes of the time, and it has been suggested that Beden was her surname.

Jane is believed to have had a learning disability.

=== Career ===
In the accounts of Anne Boleyn, bills for caps supplied to her "female jester" are recorded in 1535–36. The name of this female jester is not mentioned, but may have been Jane.

In 1537, she is noted to be in service of Princess Mary. As well as Jane, Mary also employed Lucretia the Tumbler. Mary's account book records that shoes were bought for Jane and Lucretia in December 1542 and new smocks were made in January. Lucretia and Jane are known to have performed together, and Lucretia may have been Jane's minder. A barber was paid for shaving Jane's head in April, May, and June 1543. Jane was ill in July 1543. In a paper from November 26–30, 1544, it is mentioned that geese and a hen were purchased for Jane Foole.

When Catherine Parr became queen in 1543, Jane may have been transferred to Catherine's household. Jane was a well-liked jester at the court of Catherine Parr, where she is mentioned by name as "Jane Foole" in 1543. Catherine Parr bought her a red petticoat, gowns, and kirtles. She may have been depicted in the painting of Henry the Eighth and His Family (1545), in which the man on the far right is identified as her colleague, court jester William Sommers. Jane is among several women suggested as the figure on the left, in the matching end panel to his. Catherine Parr died in 1548. Jane Fool apparently returned to Mary.

=== Court of Mary I ===
When Mary I came to the throne in 1553, Jane was in her employ. A warrant for clothes at the time of Mary's coronation includes gowns of purple gold tinsel and crimson satin rayed with thread of gold for Jane. She apparently had a favoured position with Mary and was given a valuable wardrobe and an unusually large number of shoes. The queen's silkwoman, Marie Wilkinson, supplied some of her clothes. Wardrobe warrants from 1555 surviving in the Bodleian Library mention a gown of green figured velvet (similar to one made for Will Sommers) furred with white hare skins, black knitted hose, another green velvet gown dressed with tinsel cloth, and a fustian-lined Dutch or German-style gowns of crimson and purple striped satin and blue damask. Another fool called Beden was given a Dutch gown of cloth. This style of gown, and the use of striped fabrics, may have made a costume deemed suitable for fools.

Jane's head was shaved, just as the heads of male jesters. Jane hurt her eye in 1557. Mary gave gilt silver salts as rewards to two women who looked after her, a Mistress Ayer and a woman from Bury St Edmunds who healed her.

Mary still paid Jane even when Jane got sick and was unable to perform.

It has been suggested that Jane was married to Will Sommers, but this has not been confirmed. It is known that Jane and Will Sommers often performed together, dressed in matching outfits: they are noted to have done so in 1555.

It is not known what happened to her after Mary's death in 1558.

== Fiction ==
Philippa Gregory's historical novel The Queen's Fool is focused on a female jester active in the court of Mary I, though the fictional character is not called "Jane Foole".

Jane Fool appears as a character in C. J. Sansom's novel Lamentation.

Jane Fool appears as a character in Kathryn Lasky's series Tangled in Time.
