= Will Sommers =

Court jester of Henry VIII of England

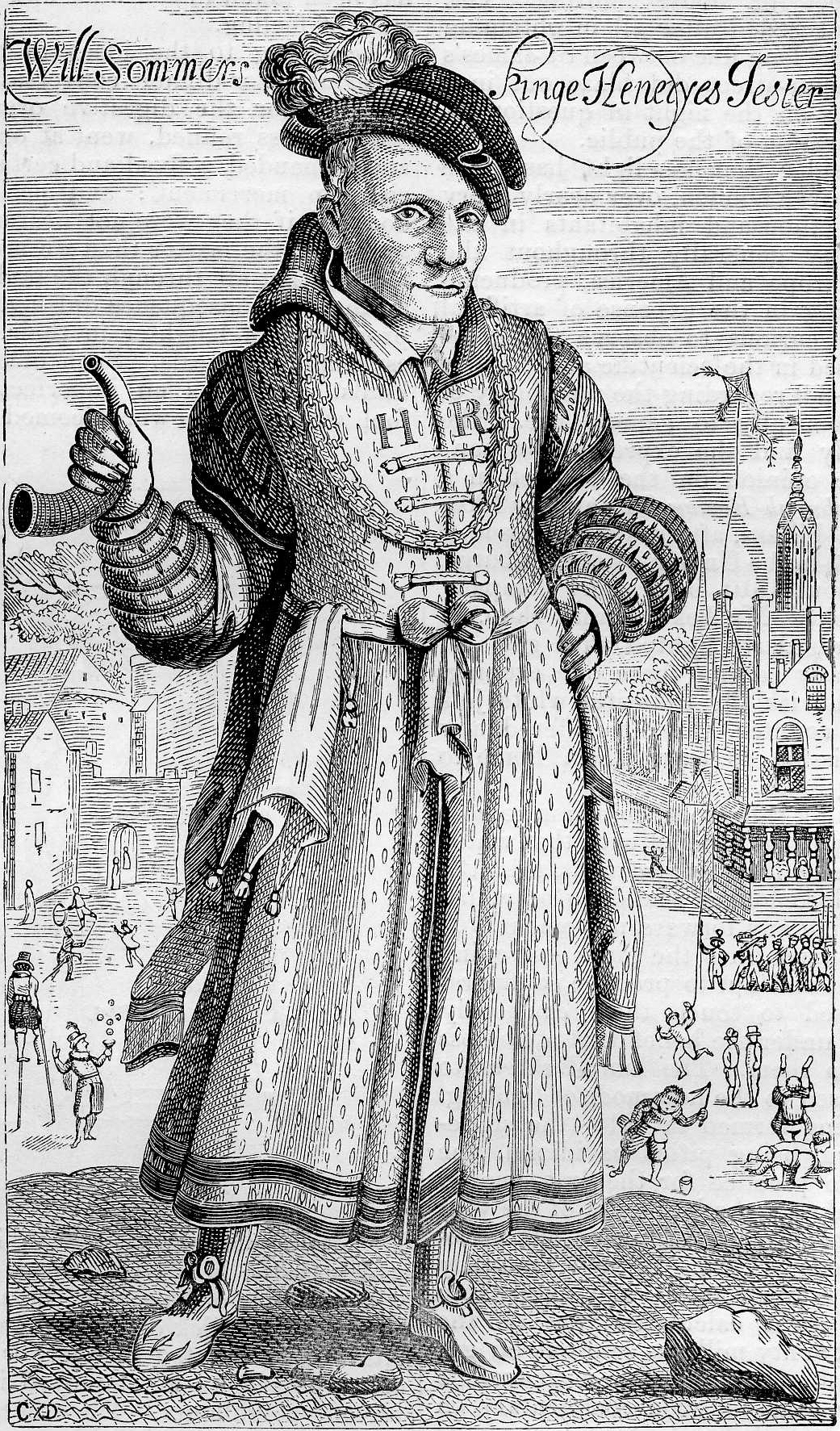
Engraving of Will Sommers by Francis Delaram c. 1615–24

William Sommers (or Somers or Somer; died 15 June 1560) was the best-known court jester of Henry VIII of England.

== Early life ==
He was said to have been born in Shropshire, and came to the attention of Richard Fermor, a merchant of the Staple at Calais, who brought him to Greenwich in 1525 to present to the King. This comes from an 18th-century account; little is known for certain of his early life. He is first mentioned in the royal accounts on 28 June 1535.

== Career ==
Sommers remained in service to the King for the rest of Henry's life. In the King's later years, when he was troubled by a painful leg condition, it was said that only Sommers could lift his spirits.

The jester or fool was also a man of integrity and discretion. Thomas Cromwell appreciated that Sommers sometimes drew the King's attention to extravagance and waste within the royal household by means of a joke.

Natural fools (sometimes referred to as jesters, but a jester is more properly an 'artificial fool') were often 'kept' at court and in aristocratic families. They were people believed to have intellectual disabilities. The term 'natural fool' is contemporaneous, and reflects Tudor society having a place for people with intellectual disabilities. Fools such as Sommers were given the support they needed and status within society.

Such individuals were permitted familiarities without regard for deference, and Sommers possessed a shrewd wit, which he exercised even on Cardinal Wolsey. He did occasionally overstep the boundaries, however. In 1535, the King threatened to kill Sommers with his own hand, after Sir Nicholas Carew dared him to call Queen Anne "a ribald" and the Princess Elizabeth "a bastard".

Robert Armin (writer of Foole upon Foole, 1600) tells how Sommers humiliated Thomas, the King's juggler. He interrupted one of Thomas's performances carrying milk and a bread roll. Will asked the King for a spoon; the King replied he had none. Thomas told him to use his hands. Will then sang:

This bit Harry I give to thee
and this next bit must serve for me,
Both which I'll eat apace.
This bit Madam unto you,
And this bit I my self eate now,
And the rest upon thy face.

He then threw the milk in his face and ran out. Thomas was never at court again.

Sommers used his influence to compensate an uncle who had been ruined by an enclosure of common land, although it took a very subtle appeal by Sommers to Henry.

In Thomas Wilson's Arte of Rhetorique (1553–60), Will is quoted telling the financially hard-up King, "You have so many Frauditors [Auditors], so many Conveighers [Surveyors], and so many Deceivers [Receivers] that they get all to themselves."

== Depictions ==
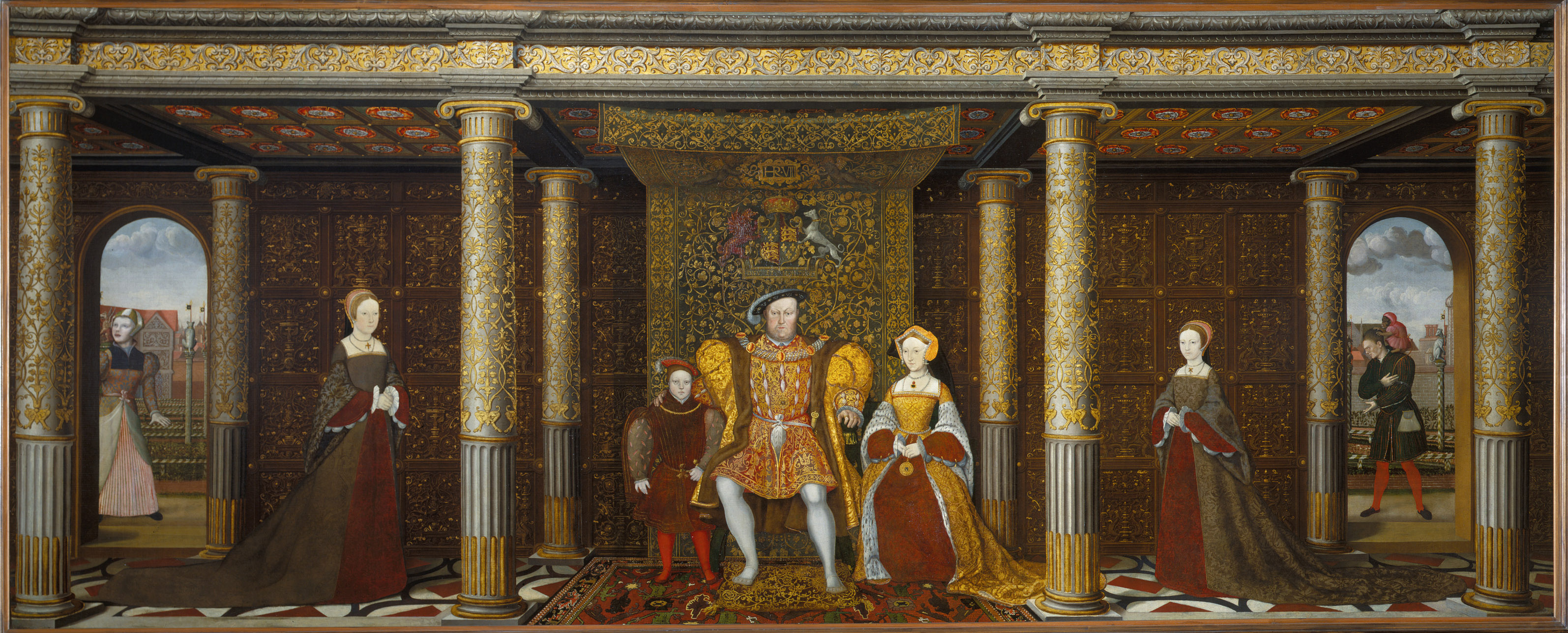
Henry the Eighth and His Family (1545) – the man at the far right is the jester Will Somers, and it has been suggested that the woman at the far left is the jester Jane Foole

Sommers is believed to be portrayed in a painting of Henry VIII and family at the Palace of Whitehall. It was completed around 1544–45 by an unknown artist. Sommers also appears with Henry VIII in the Psalter of Henry VIII that was made for the King and is now in the British Library (MS Royal 2. A. XVI). A previously unknown picture in which Sommers appears was discovered in 2008 at Boughton House, Northamptonshire.

In 1625, Honor Procter of Cowling Hall owned a portrait of Will Sommers and another of Jane Shore.

== Costume ==
A number of records detailing clothes given to Will Sommers during the reigns of Henry VIII and Mary I survive. The earliest record dates from 28 June 1535, when he was given two worsted linen doublets, a green coat and cap fringed with red crewel wool, another green coat and hood fringed with white, and a demi-coat of green with a hood. His hose were blue trimmed with red and black. The image of Will Somers in Henry VIII's Psalter, British Library, Royal MS 2A XVI, shows him wearing a short green coat with a hood.

At the time of the coronation of Mary I in 1553, Will Sommers and Jane Foole were given clothes. In April 1555, Will Sommers received a gown furred with lamb skins, and with grey jennet's tails, with a cope or hood, and a gown of and a jerkin green figured velvet furred with white hare skins. Jane Foole received a similar gown. In October 1555, Will Sommers received two green coats, one guarded with the velvet, the other plain-lined with cotton.

== After Henry ==
After Henry's death, Sommers remained at court, eventually retiring during the reign of Elizabeth I.

At Christmas 1551, Edward VI planned a staged combat to "be foughte with Wylliam Somer". Under Mary I, Will's role was mainly ceremonial, and as a sidekick to Mary's personal fool, Jane Foole. Will was reputed to be the only man who made Mary laugh, apart from John Heywood. Will's last public event was the coronation of Elizabeth I.

== Death ==
He was probably the William Sommers whose death is recorded in the parish of St. Leonards, Shoreditch, on 15 June 1560. A modern plaque in the church commemorates his burial there.

== In culture ==
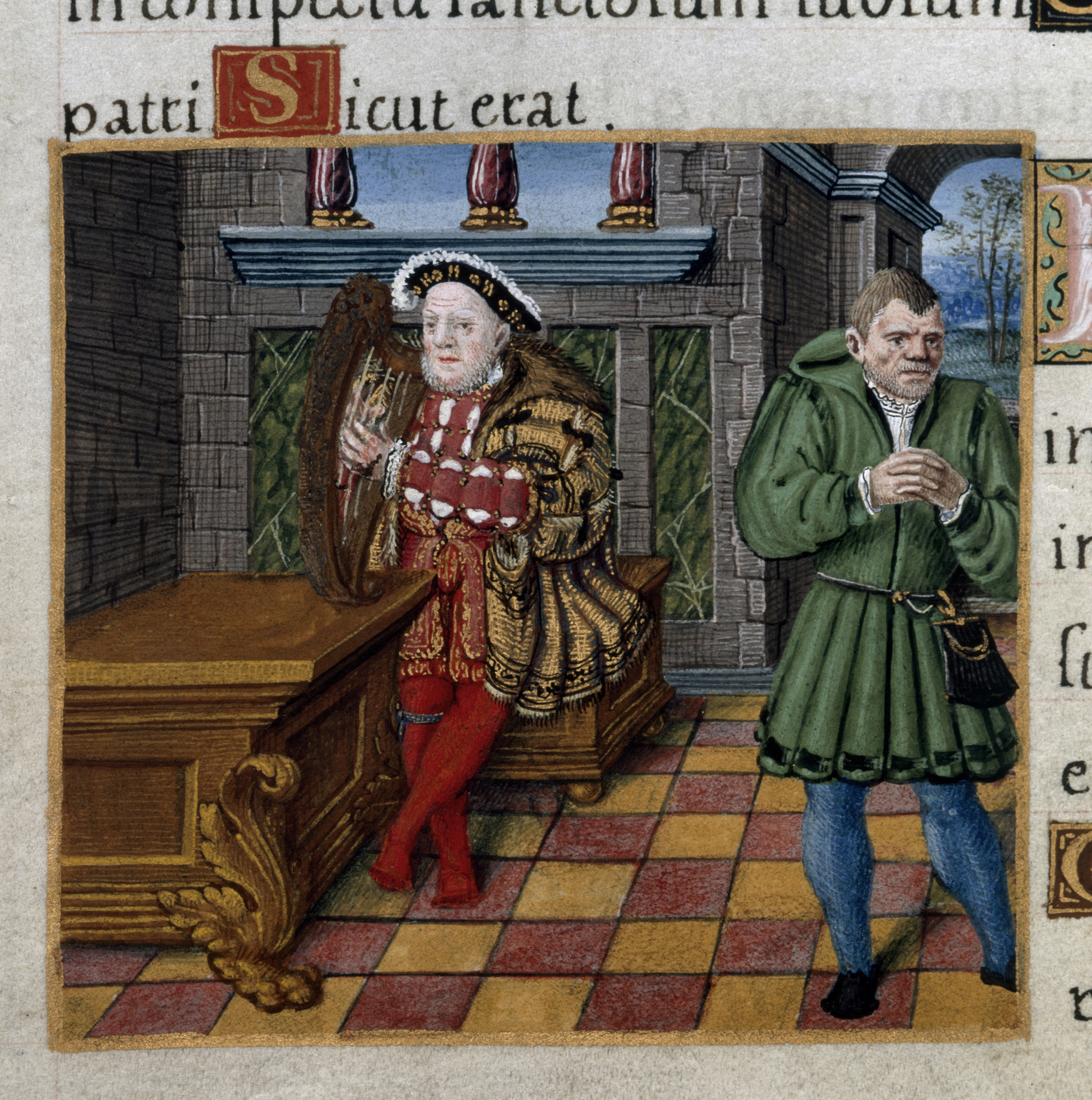
Illustration of Henry playing a harp next to Sommers (Psalter of Henry VIII)

William Sommers made a number of appearances in sixteenth- and seventeenth-century drama and literature: for example, Thomas Nashe's Pleesant Comedie called Summers last Will and Testament (play first performed in 1592, published in 1600), Samuel Rowlands' Good Newes and Bad Newes (1622), and a popular account, A Pleasant Historie of the Life and Death of William Sommers (reprinted 1794). See also John Doran's History of Court Fools (1858).

Howard Goorney played Will Sommers in episodes 5 and 6 of the 1970 BBC mini-series The Six Wives of Henry VIII.

In Margaret George's 1986 fictional The Autobiography of Henry VIII, Will Somers protects the manuscript from Queen Mary, who would destroy it. "Somers" adds observations in his own hand that throw light on the old King's hypocrisies and failings.

On 14 August 1995, comedian Roy Hudd played Will Sommers in "Fourth Wedding and Some Funerals", the second episode of the BBC Radio 2 series Crowned Hudds; the episode and series have since been re-broadcast on BBC Radio 7 and BBC Radio 4 Extra.

Will Sommers has a major part in the plot of The Queen's Fool, a 2004 historical fiction novel by Philippa Gregory. That book's protagonist is Hannah Green, a fictional jester at the court of Mary I of England. Sommers is shown as Hannah's very sympathetic mentor, training her in the art of being a jester and unstintingly sharing his professional secrets with her.

David Bradley played Will Sommers in the fifth episode of the third season of the Showtime series The Tudors (2009). The real Sommers was younger than Henry VIII but in this series he is portrayed as an elderly and sardonic attendant who provides the grieving king with consolation following the death of Jane Seymour.

In April 2016, Ottawa actor and playwright Pierre Brault premiered his solo show entitled Will Somers: Keeping Your Head, speculating on Sommer's life and the role of comedy has in speaking to power.

Will Somers is the main character and narrator of the historical novels King's Fool (1959, ISBN 978-1402219023) by Margaret Campbell Barnes, The Last of Days (2013, ISBN 978-0755397877) by Paul C. Doherty and Fall of the House of Queens: Book One of The Shattered Rose Series (2017, ISBN 978-1514807293) by Shelly Talcott (in this fictional autobiographical account, while he is depicted as a hunchback [which historically he was not], he becomes a trusted confidant of not only Henry himself but also many of the important personages at court and all but one of Henry VIII's wives).

Today, entertainers sometimes perform as 'Will' in Renaissance-themed entertainments such as Renaissance faires.
