= The Other Boleyn Girl (2008 film) =

2008 film by Justin Chadwick

- Theatrical release poster
- Directed by: Justin Chadwick
- Screenplay by: Peter Morgan
- Based on: The Other Boleyn Girl by Philippa Gregory
- Produced by: Alison Owen
- Starring: Natalie Portman; Scarlett Johansson; Eric Bana; Kristin Scott Thomas; Mark Rylance; David Morrissey
- Cinematography: Kieran McGugan
- Edited by: Paul Knight; Carol Littleton
- Music by: Paul Cantelon
- Production companies: Columbia Pictures; Focus Features; Relativity Media; BBC Films; Scott Rudin Productions; Ruby Films
- Distributed by: Sony Pictures Releasing (North America); Universal Pictures International and Focus Features International (Select territories)
- Release dates: 15 February 2008 (Berlinale); 29 February 2008 (United States); 7 March 2008 (United Kingdom)
- Running time: 115 minutes
- Countries: United Kingdom; United States
- Language: English
- Budget: $35 million
- Box office: $78.2 million

The Other Boleyn Girl is a 2008 historical romantic drama film directed by Justin Chadwick. The screenplay by Peter Morgan was adapted from Philippa Gregory’s 2001 novel of the same name.

It is a fictionalised account of the lives of 16th-century English aristocrats Mary Boleyn, mistress of King Henry VIII, and her sister, Anne, who became the monarch's ill-fated second wife.

The film was released on February 29, 2008.

== Plot ==
Henry VIII of England's marriage to his brother's widow, Catherine of Aragon, has not produced a male heir. Their only surviving child is Princess Mary, whom Henry fears cannot successfully rule.

Mary Boleyn weds Sir William Carey, one of Henry's courtiers. Mary's maternal uncle, Thomas Howard, Duke of Norfolk and her father, Sir Thomas Boleyn, plot to install her older (Note: Though most historians have concluded that Mary was the older sibling, the film and novel inaccurately portray Anne as the elder.) sister, Anne, as Henry's mistress to improve the family's status. Anne is promised an eventual marriage to a high-born nobleman. Anne accepts.

When Henry is injured in a hunting accident, he becomes smitten with Mary, who tends to his wounds. This grants the Boleyn's a prominent place at court. Mary and Anne become ladies-in-waiting to Queen Catherine of Aragon.

The King seduces Mary, who becomes his mistress. Anne secretly marries her lover Henry Percy, a nobleman betrothed to Lady Mary Talbot. When her brother, George, learns about the marriage, he informs Mary. Matrimony among nobles must first be approved by the king. To protect Anne, Mary alerts their father and uncle, who have the union annulled. Anne is sent to France to learn court manners.

When Mary becomes pregnant with Henry's child, Sir Thomas leverages this to obtain lands and positions for himself and his family. George is unhappily betrothed to Lady Jane Parker. When Mary is confined to bedrest during her pregnancy, Norfolk recalls Anne to distract Henry from seeking another mistress.

Resentful that Henry initially preferred her sister, Anne beguiles him by refusing his advances. Mary gives birth to her and Henry's son, but Anne diverts his attention. This irritates Norfolk until Anne reveals her ambitions to be queen and produce a legitimate male heir. She continues refusing Henry's advances, promising to accept if he stops bedding Catherine and speaking to Mary. Shortly afterwards, Mary and her child are exiled to the countryside with the returning Carey, who soon dies of illness.

Anne pressures Henry to break from the Catholic Church when Pope Clement VII refuses to allow him to divorce Catherine. Henry learns rumors of Anne's marriage to Percy; Mary is returned to court but assures him the rumors are false. She stays at Anne's urging.

Henry declares himself Supreme Head of the "Church of England", grants his own divorce, and banishes Catherine to Kimbolton castle located in Kimbolton Cambridgeshire. When Anne refuses to consummate their relationship before they are legally married, he, overcome with rage and lust, rapes her. Despite being deeply traumatized, the now pregnant Anne marries Henry and is crowned England's new queen consort.

Anne gives birth to a daughter, Elizabeth. Henry loved Elizabeth but is still yet disappointed he still has no male heir but secretly courts Jane Seymour. Anne is deeply hated by the English people, and she develops paranoia as her marriage collapses.

After miscarrying a son, Anne fears for her life and begs George to impregnate her. He agrees but cannot go through with it. Unbeknownst to them, his spying wife Jane reports her suspicions to Norfolk and the King. Anne and George are both arrested on charges of incest, adultery and high treason.

Despite a lack of evidence, both are hastily convicted and sentenced to death. Mary begs Henry to spare Anne, and he seemingly agrees out of kindness toward her. The sisters reconcile, and Anne requests that Mary raise Elizabeth as her own.

Mary receives a secret letter from Henry, instructing her not to return to court. Despite Henry's earlier promise, Anne is executed so he can lawfully marry Jane Seymour. Mary watches in despair as Anne is beheaded.

Sir Thomas died two years after the executions; Norfolk was later disgraced and imprisoned, and the next three generations of the Howard family were executed for treason; Mary remarried to William Stafford and spent the remainder of her life living in the country; Elizabeth went on to rule England for over forty years as Queen Elizabeth I.

== Cast ==
- Natalie Portman as Anne Boleyn. Portman was attracted to the role because it was a character that she "hadn't played before", and describes Anne as "strong, yet she can be vulnerable and she's ambitious and calculating and will step on people but also feels remorse for it". One month before filming began, Portman started taking daily classes to master the English accent under dialect coach Jill McCulloch, who also stayed on set throughout the filming. This was her second film to use her English accent after V for Vendetta. She wore hair extensions for the long hair when her hair was short at the time after shaving her head for V for Vendetta.
- Scarlett Johansson as Mary Boleyn, Anne and George's sister and Thomas Boleyn and Elizabeth Howard's daughter. She dislikes court life and would much rather live in the countryside. She is first married to William Carey. After his death, she remarries to a man named William Stafford.
- Eric Bana as Henry VIII. Bana commented that he was surprised upon being offered the role, and describes the character of Henry as "a man who was somewhat juvenile and driven by passion and greed", and that he interpreted the character as "this man who was involved in an incredibly intricate, complicated situation, largely through his own doing". In preparation for the role, Bana relied mostly on the script to come up with his own version of the character, and he "deliberately stayed away" from other portrayals of Henry in films because he found them "too confusing and restricting".
- Jim Sturgess as George Boleyn, Viscount Rochford. Though the three siblings are all very tight-knit, George and Anne are closest. George supports and loves Anne for her rebellious and unconventional attitude. He is forced to marry Jane Parker. George is often viewed as the most vulnerable and probably the kindest of the siblings.
- Kristin Scott Thomas as Elizabeth Boleyn, Countess of Wiltshire and Ormond
- Mark Rylance as Thomas Boleyn, Earl of Wiltshire and Ormond
- David Morrissey as Thomas Howard, Duke of Norfolk
- Benedict Cumberbatch as William Carey
- Oliver Coleman as Henry Percy, Earl of Northumberland
- Ana Torrent as Catherine of Aragon
- Eddie Redmayne as William Stafford
- Juno Temple as Jane Parker
- Iain Mitchell as Thomas Cromwell
- Corinne Galloway as Jane Seymour
- Constance Stride as young Mary Tudor
- Maisie Smith as young Elizabeth Tudor
- Alfie Allen as the King's Messenger

Andrew Garfield filmed scenes portraying Francis Weston, but he was ultimately cut from the final film. He retained a credit for his role however.

== Production ==
Much of the filming took place in Kent, England, though Hever Castle was not used, despite being the original household of Thomas Boleyn and family from 1505 to 1539. The Baron's Hall at Penshurst Place featured, as did Dover Castle, which stood in for the Tower of London in the film, and Knole House in Sevenoaks was used in several scenes. The home of the Boleyns was represented by Great Chalfield Manor near Melksham, Wiltshire, and other scenes were filmed at locations in Derbyshire, including Cave Dale, Haddon Hall, Dovedale and North Lees Hall near Hathersage.

Dover Castle was transformed into the Tower of London for the execution scenes of George and Anne Boleyn. Knole House was the setting for many of the film's London night scenes and the inner courtyard doubles for the entrance of Whitehall Palace where the grand arrivals and departures were staged. The Tudor Gardens and Baron's Hall at Penshurst Place were transformed into the interiors of Whitehall Palace, including the scenes of Henry's extravagant feast.

== Release ==
=== Theatrical ===
The film was first released in theatres on February 29, 2008, though its world premiere took place at the 58th Berlin International Film Festival held February 7–17, 2008. The film earned $9,442,224 in the United Kingdom, and $26,814,957 in the United States and Canada. The combined worldwide gross of the film was $78,199,679, more than double the film's $35 million budget.

=== Home media ===
The film was released in Blu-ray and DVD formats on June 10, 2008. Extras on both editions include an audio commentary with director Justin Chadwick, deleted and extended scenes, character profiles, and featurettes. The Blu-ray version includes BD-Live capability and an additional picture-in-picture track with character descriptions, notes on the original story, and passages from the original book.

== Soundtrack ==
The Other Boleyn Girl (Original Motion Picture Soundtrack)

Soundtrack album by Paul Cantelon
- Released: 26 February 2008
- Genre: Soundtrack
- Length: 1:02:21
- Label: Varèse Sarabande

Paul Cantelon chronology
The Diving Bell & The Butterfly (2007)	The Other Boleyn Girl (Original Motion Picture Soundtrack) (2008)	W. (2008)

No.	Title	Length
1.	"Opening Titles"	2:26
2.	"The Banquet"	0:55
3.	"Henry Is Hurt"	2:04
4.	"Henry Returns"	2:08
5.	"Mary Tends to Henry"	1:15
6.	"Going to Court"	0:47
7.	"Mary and Henry"	2:13
8.	"Anne's Secret Marriage"	3:10
9.	"Anne Is Exiled"	2:19
10.	"Mary Is Pregnant"	1:04
11.	"Anne Returns"	4:09
12.	"Anne Charms Henry"	2:21
13.	"Mary in Labor"	3:30
14.	"Mary Leaves Court"	1:41
15.	"My Sweet Lord"	0:58
16.	"Mary Lies for Anne"	2:47
17.	"Queen Katherine's Trial"	2:41
18.	"Banished"	2:32
19.	"Anne's Coronation"	1:19
20.	"A Baby Girl for Anne"	1:14
21.	"Henry Wants a Son"	2:09
22.	"Anne Miscarries"	2:38
23.	"Anne Conspires"	2:59
24.	"Anne and George"	2:03
25.	"Guilty"	2:37
26.	"The Execution"	6:14
27.	"Finale"	2:08
Total length:		1:02:21

== Critical reception ==
The film received mixed reviews. Rotten Tomatoes reported an approval rating of 43%, based on 148 reviews, with a weighted average of 5.30/10. The site's general consensus is: "Though it features some extravagant and entertaining moments, The Other Boleyn Girl feels more like a soap opera than historical drama." Metacritic reported the film had an average score of 50 out of 100, based on 34 reviews.

Manohla Dargis of The New York Times called the film "more slog than romp" and an "oddly plotted and frantically paced pastiche." She added, "The film is both underwritten and overedited. Many of the scenes seem to have been whittled down to the nub, which at times turns it into a succession of wordless gestures and poses. Given the generally risible dialogue, this isn’t a bad thing."

Mick LaSalle of the San Francisco Chronicle said, "This in an enjoyable movie with an entertaining angle on a hard-to-resist period of history ... Portman's performance, which shows a range and depth unlike anything she's done before, is the No. 1 element that tips The Other Boleyn Girl in the direction of a recommendation ... [She] won't get the credit she deserves for this, simply because the movie isn't substantial enough to warrant proper attention."

Peter Travers of Rolling Stone stated, "The film moves in frustrating herks and jerks. What works is the combustible teaming of Natalie Portman and Scarlett Johansson, who give the Boleyn hotties a tough core of intelligence and wit, swinging the film's sixteenth-century protofeminist issues handily into this one."

Peter Bradshaw of The Guardian awarded the film three out of five stars, describing it as a "flashy, silly, undeniably entertaining Tudor romp" and adding, "It is absurd yet enjoyable, and playing fast and loose with English history is a refreshing alternative to slow and tight solemnity; the effect is genial, even mildly subversive ... It is ridiculous, but imagined with humour and gusto: a very diverting gallop through the heritage landscape."

Sukhdev Sandhu of The Telegraph said, "This is a film for people who prefer their costume dramas to gallop along at a merry old pace rather than get bogged down in historical detail ... Mining relatively familiar material here, and dramatising highly dubious scenarios, [Peter Morgan] is unable to make the set-pieces seem revelatory or tart ... In the end, The Other Boleyn Girl is more anodyne than it has any right to be. It can't decide whether to be serious or comic. It promises an erotic charge that it never carries off, inducing dismissive laughs from the audience for its soft-focus love scenes soundtracked by swooning violins. It is tasteful but unappetising."

== Potential sequel ==
Production studio BBC Films also owns the rights to adapt the 2006 sequel novel, The Boleyn Inheritance, which tells the story of Anne of Cleves, Catherine Howard and Jane Parker.

== See also ==
- The Other Boleyn Girl (2003 film)
- Anne Boleyn in popular culture
