= Lucretia the Tumbler =

Jester in the court of Mary I of England

Lucretia the Tumbler, also known as Lucrece the Tumbler and Lucrecia the Tumbler (fl. 1542 - fl. 1543), was a court jester in the court of Mary I of England.

Lucretia was possibly of Italian origin. She was employed as a chamberer to Princess Mary. She was a member of her household from at least 1542.

She and Jane Foole sometimes received identical clothes and shoes. It has been suggested by author John Southworth that Lucretia was at some time Jane's caretaker or companion. It is known that Lucretia and Jane performed together. However, unlike Jane, Lucretia was a trained entertainer with skills. Aside from her possible role as Jane Foole's caretaker and companion, she performed acrobatic dance.

Today entertainers sometimes perform as Lucretia in Renaissance-themed entertainments such as Renaissance faires.
