= The Other Boleyn Girl =

2001 historical novel by Philippa Gregory

- First edition
- Author: Philippa Gregory
- Language: English
- Series: Tudor Series
- Genre: Novel
- Publisher: Scribner
- Publication date: 2001
- Publication place: United Kingdom
- Media type: Print (hardback & paperback)
- Pages: 664
- ISBN: 0-7394-2711-3 (hardcover edition)
- Preceded by: The Constant Princess
- Followed by: The Boleyn Inheritance

The Other Boleyn Girl (2001) is a historical novel written by British author Philippa Gregory, loosely based on the life of 16th-century aristocrat Mary Boleyn (the sister of Anne Boleyn), of whom little is known. Inspired by Mary's life story, Gregory depicts the annulment of one of the most significant royal marriages in English history (that of King Henry VIII and Catherine of Aragon) and conveys the urgency of the need for a male heir to the throne.

Reviews were mixed; some say the book was a brilliantly claustrophobic look at palace life in Tudor England, while others are troubled by the lack of historical accuracy.

The novel was twice adapted into films of the same name.

It was followed by a sequel called The Queen's Fool, set during the reign of Henry's daughter, Queen Mary. The Queen's Fool was followed by The Virgin's Lover, set during the early days of Queen Elizabeth I's reign.

== Plot ==
In 1521 England, Queen Catherine of Aragon's failure to provide King Henry VIII a male heir has strained their marriage. Thomas Boleyn and his brother-in-law, Thomas Howard, Duke of Norfolk, plan to install Boleyn's youngest daughter Mary, wife of courtier William Carey, as the king's mistress. Mary's sister Anne, who recently returned from the French court, and brother George help Mary prepare, and Henry soon takes a liking to Mary, who despite her devotion to Queen Catherine falls in love with Henry. The affair strains Mary's friendship with the queen, especially after Mary becomes pregnant by the king.

Henry rewards Mary's family with lands and titles, elevating their status amongst the other noble families of the royal court. Anne catches the eye of Henry Percy, heir presumptive to the Duchy of Northumberland, and marries him in secret. Percy, however, is set to marry Mary Talbot, the daughter of the Earl of Shrewsbury. Cardinal Thomas Wolsey has the marriage annulled and "restores" Anne's virginity. She is sent away from court to their estate, Hever Castle as punishment.

Mary gives birth to a daughter in 1524 and names her Catherine. The king is somewhat indifferent to their daughter, who is presented as Mary's child with her husband, and they continue their affair. George reluctantly marries lady-in-waiting Jane Parker, and eventually admits to his sisters that he has romantic feelings for a man: Sir Francis Weston. Mary becomes pregnant by the king again, and her family returns Anne to court so that she can maintain the king's interest until the baby is born. Instead, Anne succeeds as seducing the king away from Mary just as she gives birth to a son, who is also presented as her husband's child.

The family's attentions shift to supporting Anne, who the king now favors. She resists his desires to make her his mistress, instead pressuring him to set Queen Catherine aside and marry her instead. Mary reconciles with her husband, William, and they share a brief period of happiness before he dies from the sweating sickness. She continues to support Anne, but longs to be with her children at Hever, which she is only permitted to visit each summer. Mary observes as Anne, for seven long years, strives to maintain the king's interest.

Eventually, Queen Catherine stands trial for the validity of her marriage to Henry. The king believes she consummated her previous marriage with his dead brother, Prince Arthur, and did not come into their marriage a virgin. The Queen is banished, and Anne, now engaged to marry Henry, adopts Mary's son to ensure she has a male heir to the throne.

Anne suffers a decline in popularity during her travels abroad, culminating in the King and Queen of France, who do not tolerate her position, refusing to meet her. She eventually sleeps with Henry after he grants her a title and marries him when he installs a new archbishop and proclaims himself Head of the Church of England. Anne gives birth to a daughter in 1533, whom she names Elizabeth. Anne, however, starts to lose the king's favor after several miscarriages and stillbirths.

Mary begins a relationship with Essex landowner William Stafford, despite their difference in rank. She marries him in secret and only tells her family when she becomes pregnant and can no longer hide the truth. Anne reacts with anger, jealous of Mary's pregnancy after her own repeated miscarriages and stillbirths.

Henry suffers an injury to his leg while jousting in 1536, and his time recovering stokes worries that public sentiment is turning. Meanwhile, Anne grows increasingly paranoid, convinced she has lost the support of her family and the country and that Henry is in love with her lady-in-waiting, Jane Seymour. She rejoices in her new pregnancy after hearing news of Queen Catherine's death. Mary meanwhile notices Anne's closeness with George, especially after Anne suffers another stillbirth and the child is deformed, leading to suspicions of incest or witchcraft.

Mary makes plans with William to travel for the country to avoid the turmoil. Before they can do so, Henry places Anne and George under arrest on charges of adultery and incest due to widespread belief that they slept together to give Anne her much-needed son. Anne later presents herself before the Privy Council, which finds her guilty. George and Weston are also convicted and beheaded.

Mary attends Anne's execution, believing that the king will spare her sister and send her to a nunnery, but Henry does not appear and her sentence is not commuted. Anne is executed and Mary swiftly leaves London with her husband and children.

== Characters ==
- Mary Boleyn/Carey/Stafford: The main character of the story, told from her point of view. Mary is portrayed as an innocent, sexually naïve, young girl who, forced by her family, engages in an affair with Henry VIII under the influence of her sister Anne and her brother George. The novel begins when Mary is thirteen and ends just days after Anne's execution.
- Anne Boleyn: Anne is Mary's elder, more ambitious, sister (although research suggests that she was the younger of the two girls). Anne makes her first appearance at the beginning of the story when she is fifteen. At first, she is instructed to guide Mary in seducing Henry, but later steals Henry's affections when she aims to overthrow Catherine as queen. Anne is portrayed as coldhearted and selfish, but will occasionally show affection to Mary and her family.
- George Boleyn: George is the eldest Boleyn child, and eventually Viscount Rochford. He is shown as caring and supportive to Mary, particularly when she is forced to stop her affair with Stafford. It is implied that he is sexually attracted to Anne, and is conducting an affair with Francis Weston. At the end of the book, George is executed, along with the others accused of committing adultery with Anne.
- Henry VIII: King of England, Henry first beds Mary, but is diverted by Anne, who refuses him sexual favors unless he makes her Queen. Though well-meaning, Henry is shown to be easily persuaded by Anne, and quick-tempered.
- William Carey: Mary's first husband, he dies half-way through the story from an outbreak of the sweating sickness.
- William Stafford: Mary's second husband who pursues Mary, and on the voyage to France, the two begin an affair. Later in the novel, they are married in secret, and have one daughter together, Anne (named in honor of the Queen). William genuinely loved Mary, and her two elder children, and was willing to help her retrieve her son Henry from Anne's wardship. At the end of the novel, she and William leave for the country with the three children.
- Catherine of Aragon: Queen Consort of England, she has been married to Henry VIII for two decades but they have only one daughter together. A strict Catholic, she puts religious pressure on the King to not divorce her.

== Adaptations ==
- The Other Boleyn Girl (2003), telefilm directed by Philippa Lowthorpe
  A 90-minute television drama based on the novel was broadcast by the BBC in 2003. It had a relatively low production budget of £750,000 and was filmed using modern camera techniques, with much of the script improvised. Jodhi May played Anne Boleyn, Natascha McElhone played Mary, Steven Mackintosh played George, Jared Harris played Henry VIII, and Philip Glenister played Stafford. It received mixed reviews.
- The Other Boleyn Girl (2008), film directed by Justin Chadwick
  A 2008 feature film adaptation starred Scarlett Johansson as Mary, Natalie Portman as Anne, Jim Sturgess as George, Eric Bana as Henry VIII and Eddie Redmayne as Stafford. In Translating Henry to the Screen, a bonus feature on the DVD release of the film, screenwriter Peter Morgan discusses the dilemma he faced in adapting Philippa Gregory's 600-plus-page novel for the screen. He ultimately decided to use it merely as a broad guideline for his script, which Gregory felt perfectly captured the essence of her book, although many plot elements were eliminated, diminished, or changed. Among the more notable deviations in the film, Mary's marriage to William Stafford, a major part of the book, is mentioned only in a note just before the closing credits, there is no mention of Anne's "stealing" Mary's son to keep a grip on the king's favour (there was a scene designed to vaguely cover that, but it was cut from the film), Anne becomes pregnant with Elizabeth after being raped by Henry, Anne and George decide against committing incest, Mary adopts Elizabeth at the end of the film. In addition to this, the character of Elizabeth Boleyn is almost the opposite of that in the book and she is portrayed as protective of her daughters against their father and uncle and critical of the family's social climbing at the expense of their moral integrity.

== See also ==
- Anne Boleyn in popular culture

Sequels

- The Queen's Fool
- The Virgin's Lover
- The Constant Princess
- The Boleyn Inheritance
- The Other Queen
