= Anne Boleyn (play) =

2010 British drama play

- Original language: English
- Written by: Howard Brenton
- Characters: Henry VIII, Anne Boleyn, Cardinal Wolsey, Thomas Cromwell, James I, George Villiers
- Subject: English Reformation
- Genre: Drama
- Setting: England, 1519–1536 and 1603–1604

Premiere
- Date: 24 July 2010
- Place: Shakespeare's Globe
- Official website

Anne Boleyn is a play on the life of Anne Boleyn by the English author Howard Brenton, which premiered at Shakespeare's Globe in 2010. Anne Boleyn is portrayed as a significant force in the political and religious in-fighting at court and a furtherer of the cause of Protestantism in her enthusiasm for the Tyndale Bible.

== Production history ==
The play was commissioned by Shakespeare's Globe, and premiered at The Globe from 24 July to 21 August 2010 in a production directed by John Dove and with the title role played by Miranda Raison (also playing Boleyn in Shakespeare's Henry VIII in the same season). It was presented alongside the Globe's first season of Shakespeare's history plays, made up of Henry VIII, Henry IV Part 1 and Henry IV Part 2. The same production was revived in 2011 as part of the 400th anniversary celebrations of the King James Version, with most of the same cast.

The play was awarded Best New Play at the WhatsOnStage Theatregoers Choice Awards 2011.

In Spring 2012 the Globe's production was revived for a tour of England and Scotland, jointly produced by Shakespeare's Globe and English Touring Theatre and featuring many of the original cast although with Jo Herbert in the title role.

== Plot ==
The ghost of Anne Boleyn arrives, carrying a blood-stained bag containing her severed head and a copy of Tyndale's Bible, and addresses the audience. The action moves to 1603, where James I arrives in London for his English coronation and finds a chest containing Anne Boleyn's coronation dress. Searching the chest's secret compartments, he finds Anne's copies of the Tyndale Bible and The Obedience of a Christian Man. He and his lover George Villiers go to search the palace for Anne's ghost.

The action shifts to Anne Boleyn at the English court, where Henry VIII meets her, falls in love and agrees to her demand that they will not have sex until he can marry her. Henry begins proceedings to annul his marriage to Catherine of Aragon, with both Cardinal Wolsey and Wolsey's advisor manoeuvring for position.

Anne goes secretly to meet with William Tyndale and he gives her a copy of the forbidden text The Obedience of a Christian Man. She entrusts this to her ladies in waiting, but two of Wolsey's servants seize it from the ladies and take it to Wolsey, who is delighted to use it to discredit Anne with the king. Anne goes to Cromwell for advice and finds that he, like her, is a secret Protestant. Anne then takes Cromwell's advice and pre-empts Wolsey's action – in so doing she not only gets the book back but brings about Wolsey's fall. She also partially convinces Henry to accept the book's argument that the head of the church in England is not the pope but the king himself. The action then moves forward to winter 1532 in Calais, at a conference with Francis I of France, where Anne and Henry make love for the first time, with the annulment and their marriage imminent.

The action returns to James's reign, where he attempts to calm the Reformation that Anne's actions and Henry's annulment had unleashed, by holding the Hampton Court Conference between the Puritan and Anglican wings of the Church of England. The Puritan faction is led by John Reynolds and the Anglican one by Lancelot Andrews, both of them moderates. However, extremists on both sides such as Henry Barrowe cause the debate to drag on for over five hours, only ending when James angrily quashes any thoughts of making the Church of England presbyterian rather than episcopal – his struggles with presbyterianism in the Church of Scotland have led him to believe it threatens the king's position as Supreme Head of the Church of England and supreme secular ruler by divine right. He then meets with Reynolds and Andrews privately for further discussions, which end in a compromise agreement to produce an Authorised Version of the Bible with an Anglican slant but based on the Puritan-favoured Tyndale translation.

The action shifts back to Anne and the birth of the future Elizabeth I of England. She then goes to Tyndale with an offer from Cromwell of a place on the Privy Council for the better advancement of the Protestant cause, but he refuses it and tells her that he opposes Henry's divorce and does not recognise her as Henry's true wife. Some time later Anne miscarries a male child, which bruises but does not destroy her relationship with Henry, still hopeful for a son. However, Henry then takes Anne's lady in waiting Jane Seymour as a mistress and his relationship with Anne is finally wrecked when she is imprisoned by Cromwell. Anne is then kept from communicating with Henry in the lead-up to her execution, in a pre-emptive strike by Cromwell to avoid her telling Henry of Cromwell's embezzlement of funds from dissolved monasteries. The play then ends in 1603, where Anne's ghost talks with James about the Protestant Reformation she helped begin and then addresses the audience before departing.

== Cast (premiere production) ==
- Michael Bertenshaw – Robert Cecil, advisor to James
- Sam Cox – Lancelot Andrews, head of the Anglican faction, moderate
- Naomi Cranston – Lady Jane Seymour, lady-in-waiting to Anne
- John Cummins – Simpkin, servant to Wolsey and Cromwell / Parrot, servant to Cecil
- Ben Deery – George Villiers, lover of James
- Mary Doherty – Lady Celia, lady-in-waiting to Anne
- John Dougall – Thomas Cromwell, advisor to Wolsey and Henry
- Will Featherstone – Sloop, servant to Wolsey and Cromwell
- James Garnon – James I
- Peter Hamilton Dyer – William Tyndale
- Anthony Howell – Henry VIII
- Colin Hurley – Cardinal Wolsey / Henry Barrow, Puritan extremist
- Amanda Lawrence – Lady Rochford, chief lady-in-waiting to Anne
- Miranda Raison – Anne Boleyn
- Dickon Tyrrell – Dr John Reynolds, head of the Puritan faction, moderate

=== Unseen characters ===
- Thomas More
- Catherine of Aragon
- Princess Elizabeth
- Francis I of France

== See also ==
- Anne Boleyn in popular culture

== Reviews ==
- Guardian, 30 July 2010
- Mark Lawson (7 August 2010). "Seductive belief". The Tablet. 264 (8856): 29.
