= The Boleyn Inheritance =

2006 novel by Philippa Gregory

- First US edition
- Author: Philippa Gregory
- Audio read by: Bianca Amato
- Language: English
- Series: Tudor Series
- Genre: Novel
- Publisher: Touchstone
- Publication date: 2006
- Publication place: United Kingdom
- Media type: Print (hardback & paperback)
- Pages: 528
- ISBN: 0-7432-7250-1 (hardcover edition)
- Preceded by: The Other Boleyn Girl
- Followed by: The Queen's Fool

The Boleyn Inheritance is a novel by British author Philippa Gregory which was first published in 2006. It is a direct sequel to her previous novel The Other Boleyn Girl, and one of the additions to her six-part series on the Tudor royals. (The other titles in the series are The Constant Princess, The Queen's Fool, The Virgin's Lover, and The Other Queen.) The novel is told through the first-person narratives of Anne of Cleves, Katherine Howard, and Jane Boleyn, who was mentioned in The Other Boleyn Girl. It covers a period from 1539 until 1542 and chronicles the fourth and fifth marriages of King Henry VIII of England.

== Plot summary ==
The book begins in 1539, after the death of King Henry VIII's third wife, Jane Seymour. Henry is looking for a new wife and chooses Anne of Cleves, daughter of John III, Duke of Cleves, whom he has only seen from portraits sent to him by her brother, William, Duke of Jülich-Cleves-Berg.

Jane Rochford is summoned to court by the Duke of Norfolk to be a lady-in-waiting at the court of King Henry VIII. Jane has unpleasant memories of court, because she is the widow of George Boleyn and sister-in-law to Henry VIII's second wife, Anne Boleyn. George and Anne Boleyn were both executed in 1536 for "adultery, incest and plotting to murder the King".

Katherine Howard is a fourteen-year-old girl (the cousin of Anne Boleyn) living with her grandmother at Lambeth Palace, where she has grown accustomed to a lax, licentious lifestyle. She has taken a lover, Francis Dereham, and the two have sworn to be married. Katherine's uncle informs her that she will go to court if she can behave herself and she swears to herself not to let anything, including Francis, get in her way of success of the throne.

Anne, who has heard of the fates of her predecessors, is not sure about being the queen of England but is eager to leave her family, as nobody really cares for her. Her arrival in England goes well until she is surprised by a drunken man (actually Henry VIII in disguise), who plants a sloppy kiss on her; she responds with an angry shove and curses him in German. Although she tries to make amends once she is aware of his identity, the King holds a grudge for the duration of their marriage because of this. Henry is also put off by Anne's looks, since her German style of dress is bulky and unflattering, and she physically seems to appear nothing like her portrait.

Despite his misgivings, Henry goes ahead with the marriage, but he is already looking for a way out. Anne is at a great disadvantage during the first months of her new life as she hardly speaks any English or Latin, the diplomatic language of the time. Due to her strict religious upbringing, she has not been taught how to play an instrument, sing or dance, and her mother has not made her aware of the facts of life. Despite this, Anne quickly befriends Jane Rochford, who is one of her ladies-in-waiting. Jane is as surprised as anyone at Anne's plain appearance and ill proficiency at English, but Anne is an honest, sweet young woman who wins over the English people, if not her husband. She makes an effort to befriend Prince Edward, and the princesses Elizabeth and Mary, even when it enrages her husband, and makes a point to learn as much English as possible.

A few months after their wedding, Henry decides to rid himself of his new wife. Fearing for her life, Anne agrees to sign an annulment saying that she was previously betrothed to Francis of Lorraine and that her wedding was not consummated. She is given the title "Princess" and receives land, money, and the treatment reserved for the king's own sister.

Meanwhile, Henry has noticed the beautiful fourteen-year-old Katherine "Kitty" Howard, who has becomes one of the queen's ladies-in-waiting, thanks to her uncle, Thomas Howard, Duke of Norfolk. Infatuated, Henry quickly divorces Anne and marries Katherine, his "rose without a thorn". Katherine has, in turn, fallen in love with one of the king's favourite courtiers, Thomas Culpepper.

At first, Katherine enjoys the perks of being a queen but finds the condescension of her stepdaughter, Mary, irritating. (Mary is almost ten years older than she is and finds her frivolous). However, she quickly becomes aware of the drawbacks of being married to the King. Henry is no longer young and handsome; he is nearly 50 years old (her grandfather's age), weighs approximately 300 lb (140 kg), and has a festering ulcer on his thigh that permanently weeps pus and blood. Katherine's infatuation for Thomas Culpepper becomes harder and harder to hide. Encouraged by the Duke of Norfolk and Jane Rochford, who want Katherine to bear a child for the king (whom they now believe to be completely impotent), she begins an affair with the young courtier.

However, young Katherine's life goes wrong when her past returns to haunt her in the shape of her former betrothed Francis Dereham, who arrives, sent by her grandmother, who asks that he be given a post in her household. She agrees but does not like him being so close. When her affair with Culpepper is exposed by her family's enemies, her friends and family desert her to avoid being implicated too and her previous affairs are used as further evidence of adultery (which is now a treasonous offence). Although Thomas Cranmer, the Archbishop of Canterbury, tries to help her by telling her to confess that she was engaged to Dereham, making her marriage invalid, Katherine is now so frightened and hysterical that she cannot understand him and continues to state that there was no engagement. She is found guilty of adultery and treason and is executed at only sixteen, along with her beloved Thomas Culpepper and Francis Dereham. Jane tries desperately to get out of execution by feigning insanity but cannot escape the king's wrath this time. Henry changes the law so that anyone guilty of treason can be executed, mad or not. Jane is found guilty and is beheaded along with Katherine. Anne of Cleves, after being cleared of any blame, remains in her new home in England and outlives not only her supplanter, but Henry himself.

== Reception ==
In reviewing the book, Publishers Weekly wrote "Gregory's accounts of events are accurate enough to be persuasive, her characterizations modern enough to be convincing. Rich in intrigue and irony, this is a tale where readers will already know who was divorced, beheaded or survived, but will savor Gregory's sharp staging of how and why". The Historical Novel Society review summarized the book as "beautifully drawn characters, glorious storytelling – a tour de force from Philippa Gregory and a must-read".

In a 2006 book review in Kirkus Reviews the review summarized: "Royal history spoon-fed in a highly digestible form."
