= The Virgin's Lover =

Historical novel written by Philippa Gregory

- First UK edition
- Author: Philippa Gregory
- Cover artist: Cherlynne Li
- Language: English
- Series: Tudor Series
- Genre: Novel
- Publisher: Touchstone (US); HarperCollins (UK)
- Publication date: 2004
- Publication place: United Kingdom
- Media type: Print (hardback & paperback)
- Pages: 448
- ISBN: 0-7432-5615-8 (hardcover edition)
- Preceded by: The Queen's Fool
- Followed by: The Other Queen

The Virgin's Lover is a historical novel written by British author Philippa Gregory. It belongs to her series of Tudor novels, including The Constant Princess, The Other Boleyn Girl, The Boleyn Inheritance, and The Queen's Fool.

== Summary ==
The book opens in the autumn of 1558, just after the death of Mary I of England, and bells are heralding the fact that Mary's half-sister, Elizabeth, is now queen. The book is told from four main perspectives: Elizabeth I's; William Cecil's, the queen's main advisor; Robert Dudley, the queen's favourite; and Amy Robsart's, who is Robert Dudley's wife. Robert Dudley returns to court upon Elizabeth's coronation, and Amy hopes that his ambitions will not get him into trouble. During Mary's reign, Dudley was kept in the Tower of London, his father John Dudley and brother Guildford Dudley were executed, and another brother died in Calais. However, her hopes for the quiet life soon die, as Elizabeth and Robert become closer and more intimate.

Elizabeth has inherited a bankrupt and rebellious country, in turmoil as a result of the previous two monarch's reigns. Her advisor, William Cecil, warns that she will only survive if she marries a strong prince, but the only man that Elizabeth desires is her childhood friend, and married man, Robert Dudley. Robert is sure that he can reclaim his destiny at Elizabeth's side. And as queen and courtier fall in love, Dudley begins to contemplate the impossible – setting aside his loving wife to marry the young Elizabeth...
