= The Other Boleyn Girl (2003 film) =

2003 British television film

- DVD cover
- Based on: The Other Boleyn Girl by Philippa Gregory
- Screenplay by: Philippa Lowthorpe
- Story by: Philippa Gregory
- Directed by: Philippa Lowthorpe
- Starring: Natascha McElhone; Jodhi May; Jared Harris; Steven Mackintosh
- Theme music composer: Peter Salem
- Country of origin: United Kingdom
- Original language: English

Production
- Producer: Ruth Caleb
- Running time: 90 minutes
- Budget: £750 000

Original release
- Network: BBC Two
- Release: 28 March 2003

The Other Boleyn Girl is a 2003 BBC television film directed and written by Philippa Lowthorpe, adapted from Philippa Gregory's 2001 novel of the same name. It centres around courtier Mary Boleyn and her sister Anne Boleyn, second wife of Henry VIII, King of England, and their competition for his affections.

It was released on DVD on 6 October 2008, following the release of the 2008 version.

== Plot ==
The film centres on Mary Boleyn, sister of Anne and George Boleyn. Henry VIII favours Mary, recently married to William Carey, and lady-in-waiting to his wife, Catherine of Aragon. Mary is forced by her family to become the King's mistress. Mary despairs that her husband has consented to the arrangement, but begins to come to terms with her fate.

Anne falls in love with Henry Percy and, despite Mary's warnings, they consummate the relationship. Mary informs their family, who tell Anne that she has made a grave mistake. Percy is already betrothed, with royal consent. They fear it will spoil Mary's relationship with the King. Anne says she will never forget what Mary has done, and is exiled to the family home of Hever Castle. Anne declares that she will never fall in love again, plotting revenge and her return to court.

Mary falls in love with the King, and begins to enjoy their time together, becoming estranged from her husband. Soon, she becomes pregnant by the King. Anne returns to court, announcing that she is grateful and will serve her family in any way she can, but Mary is sceptical of her sincerity. The family plans for Anne to distract the King as Mary enters her confinement, but the King finds her more attractive than Mary. Learning from her sister's example, Anne cautiously turns down his attempts at seducing her, hoping to strengthen his desire for her.

Mary gives birth to a son, but the King now cares only for Anne. Devastated, Mary leaves court and reconciles with husband William. They have a daughter, but two years later, he dies from the sweating sickness. Anne tells Mary that she needs her by her side, so that she is protected from scandal. The true extent of Anne's ambition is revealed: as the King's marriage has produced no heir, and she could provide him with one, he will want to make her his new queen. Mary reminds Anne about Henry Percy, and Anne replies that Mary betrays her if she ever reveals the relationship.

The King initiates divorce proceedings against Catherine. But as they are about to be finalised, he hears that Percy's wife is seeking an annulment on the basis of a precontract between Anne and Percy, and informs Anne that they cannot be together. Faced with possible ruin, Anne pressures Mary to testify that there was no betrothal. The King makes Anne swear that she has never loved any other man, and to demonstrate her devotion she finally has sex with him. Anne triumphs as the King marries her and crowns her queen.

While Anne is pregnant with her first child, Mary sneaks away to see William Stafford, a former servant of the Boleyns, and accepts his marriage proposal. Anne banishes Mary from court, saying that the match has shamed the family. The King is disappointed when Anne gives birth to a daughter, Elizabeth, and her hold on him begins to weaken. Anne makes a jealous scene and Henry makes Anne depart the room. Her uncle follows and informs her that she now has many enemies. While visiting Wulfhall in Wiltshire, the King spends time with a daughter of the family, Jane Seymour, and greatly enjoys her company.

Anne has two miscarriages and seems unlikely to bear a son. Upon finding a pamphlet depicting her decapitation, Anne summons George and Mary, telling them the court wants her dead. Mary asks Anne when she last had sex with the King, and suggests she might have more success with a different man, implying that George and Anne should sleep together. George is horrified, but when Anne begs her brother to save her, he reluctantly consents.

Anne reveals her pregnancy to a delighted King, but when she again miscarries her days are numbered. George and other men are taken to the Tower on charges of treason and adultery; Anne is next. She reminds the King that he once loved her. Proclaiming her innocence, she asks God to have mercy on his soul, and bidding farewell to Elizabeth, sings her a song as she is led away.

Mary narrates that George, Anne and the others were beheaded. She has left court with her children, and is happy with William Stafford.

== Cast ==
- Natascha McElhone as Mary Boleyn
- Jodhi May as Anne Boleyn
- Jared Harris as Henry VIII
- Steven Mackintosh as George Boleyn
- Philip Glenister as William Stafford
- Jack Shepherd as Thomas Boleyn
- John Woodvine as Uncle Norfolk
- Ron Cook as Thomas Cromwell
- Anthony Howell as William Carey
- Jane Gurnett as Elizabeth Boleyn
- Yolanda Vazquez as Catherine of Aragon
- Geoffrey Streatfeild as Francis Weston

== Production ==
The film had a low production budget of £750,000. It was shot at Berkeley Castle in Gloucestershire, adopting techniques unusual for an historical drama. Some scenes are shot in a confessional straight-to-camera "video diary" style, and hand-held cameras are used.

The cast spent four weeks in workshops improvising the script with the director.

== Critical reception ==
The camera work proved to be somewhat divisive for critics. The Guardian's Stuart Jeffries wrote that while some previewers thought it had "the feel of Peter Greenaway-lite", he found it interfered with the story, described as "a gripping, well-written narrative" and likened it to "NYPD Blue Visits Hampton Court".
