= The Queen's Fool =

Novel by Philippa Gregory

- First US edition
- Author: Philippa Gregory
- Audio read by: Bianca Amato
- Language: English
- Series: Tudor Series
- Genre: Novel
- Publisher: Touchstone (US); HarperCollins (UK)
- Publication date: 2003
- Publication place: United Kingdom
- Media type: Print (hardback & paperback)
- Pages: 512
- ISBN: 0-7432-6982-9 (hardcover edition)
- Preceded by: The Boleyn Inheritance
- Followed by: The Virgin's Lover

The Queen's Fool by Philippa Gregory is a 2003 historical fiction novel. Set between 1548 and 1558, it is part of Philippa Gregory's Tudor series. The series includes The Boleyn Inheritance. The novel chronicles the changing fortunes of Mary I of England and her half-sister Elizabeth through the eyes of the fictional Hannah Green, a Marrano girl escaping to England from Spain where her mother was burned at the stake for being Jewish. Hannah is discovered by Robert Dudley and John Dee and subsequently begged as a fool to Edward VI. She witnesses and becomes caught up the intrigues of the young king's court, and later those of his sisters. As Mary, Elizabeth, and Robert Dudley use Hannah to gather information on their rivals and further their own aims, the novel can plausibly present each side in the complex story. The Queen's Fool follows Hannah from ages fourteen to nineteen, and her coming-of-age is interspersed among the historical narrative (see Bildungsroman). The book reached # 29 on the New York Times Best Seller list and had sold 165,000 copies within three weeks of its release.

It is a historically attested fact that a female jester was indeed active at the English royal court in the period covered by the book. Very little is known about her; the scarce sources mention her as "Jane Foole", but it is not sure if this was her real name or a nickname.

== Plot summary ==
Nine-year-old Hannah Green sees Thomas Seymour and Elizabeth flirting when she delivers books for her father. When asked why she seems surprised, she tells him she has seen a scaffold behind him. Seymour is executed within a year.

Hannah and her father run a book shop on Fleet Street. They fled Spain after Hannah's mother was burnt at the stake during the Inquisition Period. Lord Robert Dudley and John Dee, his tutor, visit the shop, where John realises Hannah has the Sight when she tells them the Angel Uriel was walking behind them. Her father denies it, calling Hannah a fool and claiming she is simple, but Robert and John insist on hiring Hannah as a holy fool to King (Edward VI). The king, learning about her gift, asks her what she sees of him. Hannah replies that she sees the gates of heaven opening for him. Amused by her answer, the king accepts her. Though unwilling at first, Hannah accepts her life at court, serving as the King's Fool and the Dudley family's vassal, performing tasks and errands as requested.

Robert sends her to spy on Lady Mary, King Edward's heir. She joins Mary's household and shortly after learns of King Edward's death and final will naming his Protestant cousin, Lady Jane Grey, his heir, declaring Mary and Elizabeth I illegitimate. Jane and her husband, the Duke of Northumberland's son, Guilford Dudley, are crowned, but the English declare for Mary, so she takes the crown nine days later with Hannah by her side. Queen Mary is crowned, making Hannah overjoyed for her mistress and heartbroken that Robert Dudley, for his hand at Northumberland's plot, is in the Tower of London.

The rise to power of the future queen Elizabeth I is a key sub-plot in The Queen's Fool.

The jester Will Sommers (an actual historical character) teaches Hannah how to be entertaining. Meanwhile, her betrothed, Daniel Carpenter, is annoyed that Hannah is in love with Robert while Hannah shares her doubts about getting married. She sets her worries aside when Mary's marriage to Prince Philip of Spain, an enthusiastic supporter of the Inquisition, will bring the Inquisition to England. Hannah's father, Daniel, and his family insist on leaving England for Calais, where they will marry immediately instead of their previous agreement to wait until Hannah's sixteenth birthday. Hannah realizes her desire for Daniel and, after Mary and Philip's marriage, they are about to leave. Still, when she sees Elizabeth heading for the Tower of London, she promises to join them in Calais when released from service. Hannah slips back into court life. She receives a letter from Daniel declaring his love, but she is unsure how she feels about him.

Over a year later, the Inquisition has spread to England, and Hannah is arrested for heresy and is taken for questioning. Luckily, the clerk is John Dee, who pretends not to know her and dismisses the charges against her as servants' gossip. She asks Daniel to come and collect her, no longer feeling safe, and he and her father collect her and sail to Calais. During the night, Hannah and Daniel declare their love for one another. In Calais, Hannah starts dressing and behaving like a lady and is instructed how to run a household by her mother-in-law. She and Daniel marry, and their families share a house. Hannah struggles to get along with Daniel's mother and sisters and, after an argument with her mother-in-law, learns Daniel had a son with another woman while she was gone. Furious, she confronts Daniel, who admits it and offers never to see the woman or his son if she forbids it. Hannah cannot forgive him and leaves Daniel. She and her father move out and start their own bookshop.

A few months later, Hannah's father dies and, as her husband, Daniel, inherits everything, he signs everything over to Hannah. She runs the printing shop, taking her father's nurse as a lodger, but flees when Calais falls to the French. Whilst escaping, she runs into Robert Dudley and the mother of her husband's son. She begs Hannah to take her baby just before being killed by a French soldier. Hannah and her stepson flee to England under the protection of Robert, his wife Amy, and friends of theirs. Visitors suspect Robert as the baby's father, treating Hannah accordingly until she tells them that the baby, named Daniel, is her husband's son. Robert is disappointed when Hannah refuses to be his mistress, realizing Daniel is the love of her life. She returns to court and is welcomed by Queen Mary and Princess Elizabeth. Mary asks her to use her gift to see if Elizabeth will keep England in the true faith. Hannah tells her that Elizabeth won't, but she will be a better queen than a woman.

When the French ransoms the English prisoners, she returns to Calais to find her husband. He is released and promises to accept Hannah's son as his own until she tells him that baby Daniel is his illegitimate son. They reunite and live together as a Jewish family – Hannah realizes the importance of her religion.

== Reception ==
The Queen's Fool reached # 29 on the New York Times Best Seller list and had sold 165,000 copies within three weeks of its release.

AudioFile magazine called main characters Mary, Elizabeth and Hannah "fully three-dimensional and unforgettable", and praised the audiobook recording's narrator Bianca Amato.
