= Maureen Peters (novelist) =

Welsh historical novelist

Maureen Peters (3 March 1935 – 8 April 2008) was a historical novelist, under her own name and pseudonyms such as Veronica Black, Catherine Darby, Belinda Gray, Levanah Lloyd, Judith Rothman, Elizabeth Law and Sharon Whitby.

== Personal life ==
She was born in Caernarvon, North Wales. She was educated at grammar school and attended the University College of North Wales, Bangor, where she obtained a Bachelor of Arts degree and a diploma of Education. For some time she taught disabled children, and then took up writing. She has produced many books and contributed short stories to many magazines.

Peters is also known as a Bronte scholar.

Maureen Peters was married and divorced twice; she had a son and two daughters.

She died on 8 April 2008.

== Writing career ==
Her novels have often focused on royalty, mostly the War of the Roses and Tudor period, and cover the lives of Elizabeth I of England, Anne Boleyn, Catherine Howard, Mary Tudor, Queen of France, as well as of other famous and less famous historical figures such as Edward II of England, the many Queen consorts of various Kings of England. Apart from biographical fiction on royalty (written under her own name), she also wrote Gothic romances, family sagas, Mills & Boon series titles, contemporary mysteries.

In her novel Anne, Rose of Hever (1970) Peters depicted Anne Boleyn as a secret pagan who is popularly suspected of being a witch. Peters based Anne, Rose of Hever on the theories of Margaret Murray.

== Bibliography ==
=== As Maureen Peters ===
==== Series ====
Malone Trilogy:
- Tansy (1975)
- Kate Alanna (1975)
- A Child Called Freedom (1976)

The Vinegar Trilogy:

- The Vinegar Seed (1986)
- The Vinegar Blossom (1986)
- The Vinegar Tree (1987)

==== Biographical historical fiction novels ====
- Bride for King James (1968)- on Anne of Denmark, consort of James VI and I
- Mary, the Infamous Queen (1968) - on Mary I of England
- Flower of the Greys (1969) - on Lady Catherine Grey
- Joan of the Lilies (1969) - on Joan of Arc
- Anne, Rose of Hever (1969) - on Anne Boleyn
- Princess of Desire (1970) - on Mary Tudor, Queen of France
- Struggle for a Crown (1970) - on Llywelyn the Last
- Seven for St. Crispin's Day (1971) - on Henry V of England
- Katheryn, the Wanton Queen (1971) - on Catherine Howard
- The Cloistered Flame (1971) - on Teresa of Ávila
- Henry VIII and His Six Wives (1972) - a novelization of the Ian Thorne screenplay of the film
- The Woodville Wench (published in US as The Queen Who Never Was) (1972) - on Elizabeth Woodville, consort of King Edward IV and The War of the Roses
- Peacock Queen (published in US as The Virgin Queen) (1972) - on Elizabeth I of England
- Elizabeth the Beloved (1972) - on Elizabeth of York
- Jewel of the Greys (1972) (published in US as Destiny's Lady) - on Lady Jane Grey
- Flawed Enchantress (1973) (in another edition as So Fair and Foul a Queen (1974)) - on Mary, Queen of Scots
- Enigma of Brontes (1974) - on Brontë sisters
- Willow Maid (1974) - on Berengaria of Navarre, consort of Richard I
- Curse of the Greys (1974) - on Frances Grey, Duchess of Suffolk, mother of Lady Jane Grey
- The Queenmaker (1975) - on Bess of Hardwick
- Crystal and the Cloud (1977) - on Bernadette of Lourdes
- The Snow Blossom (1980) - on St. Thérèse of Lisieux
- I, the Maid (1980) - on Joan of Arc
- Beggar Maid, Queen (1980) - on Anne Neville, daughter of Warwick the Kingmaker, consort of Richard III
- Frost on the Rose (1982) - on Isabella of Valois and Anne of Bohemia, consorts of Richard II
- Dragon and the Rose (1982) - on Matilda of Flanders, consort of William the Conqueror
- Red Queen, White Queen (1982) - on Matilda of Scotland and Adeliza of Louvain, consorts of Henry I of England
- Imperial Harlot (1983) - on Empress Matilda and her cousin Stephen
- My Lady Troubadour (1983) - on Eleanor of Aquitaine, consort of Henry II of England
- Lackland's Bride (1983) - on Isabella, Countess of Gloucester, who was married to John, King of England prior to his accession.
- Alianor (1984) - on Eleanor of Provence, consort of Henry III of England
- Song for Marguerite (1984) - on Margaret of France, Queen of England, consort of Edward I of England
- My Philippa (1984) - on Philippa of Hainault, consort of Edward III of England
- Isabella, the She-wolf (1985) - on Isabella of France, consort of Edward II of England
- Fair Maid of Kent (1985) - on Joan of Kent, wife of Edward, the Black Prince, mother of Richard II
- My Catalina (1988) - on Catharine of Aragon
- Noonday Queen (1988) - on Catherine Howard
- Incredible Fierce Desire (1988) - on Anne Boleyn
- Wife in Waiting (1989) - on Catherine Parr, the sixth wife of Henry VIII
- Minstrel for a Valois (1989) - on Catherine of Valois, consort of Henry V of England
- Witch Queen (1990)- on Joan of Navarre, Queen of England, consort of Henry IV of England
- Much Suspected of Me (1990) - on Elizabeth I of England
- Proud Bess (1990) - on Elizabeth I of England
- The Flower of Martinique (1991) - on Joséphine de Beauharnais, the first wife of Napoleon I and the first Empress of the French.
- England's Mistress (1991) - on Elizabeth I of England
- A Masque of Brontes (1991)- on Brontë sisters
- Green Apple Burning (1993) - on Isabelle Romée, mother of Joan of Arc
- Child of Earth (1999) - on Emily Brontë
- The Child of Fire (2002) - on Charlotte Brontë

==== Other historical fiction novels ====
- Shadow of a Tudor (1971)
- Royal Escape (1972)
- The Maid of Judah (1973)
- Gallows Herd (1973)
- Night of the Willow (1981)
- Ravenscar (1981)
- Song for a Strolling Player (1981)
- The Luck Bride (1987)
- Lady for a Chevalier (1987)
- Patchwork (1989)
- Valentine (2000)
- The Genii (2000)
- Goodbye Holly Jane (2001)
- Verity (2002)
- Trumpet Morning (2006)
- The Haunting of Houses (2006)
- Vashti (2006)
- The Scent of Jasmine (2007)
- Sun of Silver, Moon of Gold (2008)

==== Non fiction works ====
- Jean Ingelow: Victorian Poetess (1972)

=== As Catherine Darby ===
==== Falcon Saga ====
- A Falcon for a Witch (1975)
- The King's Falcon (1975)
- Fortune for a Falcon (1975)
- Season of the Falcon (January 1976)
- Falcon Royal (March 1976)
- Falcon Sunset (November 1976)
- The Falcon Tree (May 1976)
- The Falcon and the Moon (July 1976)
- Falcon Rising (September 1976)
- Seed of the Falcon (1978)
- Falcon's Claw (1978)
- Falcon to the Lure (1978)

==== Moon Chalice Quest ====
- Whisper Down the Moon (1977)
- Frost on the Moon (1977)
- The Flaunting Moon (1977)
- Sing Me a Moon (1977)
- Cobweb Across the Moon (1977)
- Moon in Pisces (1977)

==== Rowan ====
- Rowan Garth (1982)
- Rowan for a Queen (1983)
- Scent of Rowan (1983)
- Circle of Rowan (1983)
- The Rowan Maid (1984)
- Song of the Rowan (1984)

==== Novels ====
- A Dream of Fair Serpents (1979)
- Child of the Flesh (1982)
- Lass of Silver, Lad of Gold (1982)
- Sangreal (1984)
- Sabre (1985)
- Sabre's Child (1985)
- Silken Sabre (1985)
- Heart of Flame (1986)
- House of Sabre (1986)
- Breed of Sabres (1987)
- Morning of a Sabre (1987)
- Fruit of the Sabre (1988)
- Gentle Sabre (1988)
- Pilgrim in the Wind (1988)
- The Love Knot (1989)
- Zabillet of the Snow (1990)
- Daffodil Anne (1991)

=== As Elizabeth Law ===
- Double Deception(1987)
- Regency Morning (1988)
- A Scent of Lilac (1988)
- The Sealed Knot (1989)

=== As Judith Rothman ===
- With Murder in Mind (1975)

=== As Sharon Whitby ===
- The Savage Web (1982)
