= Robin Maxwell (author) =

American historical novelist (born 1948)

Robin Maxwell (born February 26, 1948) is an American historical novelist who specializes in the Tudor period. She is also a screenwriter and political blogger.

Maxwell was raised in Plainfield, New Jersey, and graduated from Tufts University. She and her husband Max, live in Pioneertown, California.

== Novels ==
- The Secret Diary of Anne Boleyn (April 1997) ISBN 1-55970-375-X
- The Queen’s Bastard (April 1999) ISBN 1-55970-475-6
- Virgin: Prelude to the Throne (June 2001) ISBN 1-55970-563-9
- The Wild Irish: Elizabeth I and the Pirate O’Malley (October 2003) ISBN 0-06-009142-8
- To the Tower Born: the Lost Princes (September 2005) ISBN 0-06-058051-8
- Mademoiselle Boleyn (November 2007) ISBN 978-0-451-22209-1
- Signora da Vinci (January 2009) ISBN 978-0-451-22580-1
- O, Juliet (February 2010) ISBN 978-0-451-22915-1
- Jane: The Woman Who Loved Tarzan (September 2012) ISBN 978-0-7653-3358-2
- Atlantos (The Early Erthe Chronicles ) (Volume 1) (July 2015) ISBN 978-0-9963-7590-0
