= Young V&A =

Museum in Bethnal Green, London

- Young V&A in 2026

- Location within London Borough of Tower Hamlets
- Established: 1872; 154 years ago
- Location: Bethnal Green; London, E2; United Kingdom
- Coordinates: 51°31′44″N 0°03′18″W
- Visitors: 604,900 (2025)
- Director: Dr Helen Charman
- Public transit access: Bethnal Green; Cambridge Heath
- Website: www.vam.ac.uk/info/young

Listed Building – Grade II*
- Designated: 27 September 1973
- Reference no.: 1357777
- Area: 1.5 acres (6,100 m^{2}), 145 galleries

Young V&A, formerly the V&A Museum of Childhood, is a branch of the Victoria and Albert Museum (the "V&A"), which is the United Kingdom's national museum of applied arts. It is in Bethnal Green in the East End of London, and specialises in objects by and for children. In 2024 it was awarded the Museum of the Year prize.

== History ==
London Museum Site Act 1868 (Note: Section 4.)
- Act of Parliament
- Parliament of the United Kingdom
- Long title: An Act to provide for the Acquisition of a Site for a Museum in the East of London.
- Citation: 31 & 32 Vict. c. 8
- Territorial extent: United Kingdom

Dates
- Royal assent: 28 February 1868
- Commencement: 28 February 1868 (Note: The Acts of Parliament (Commencement) Act 1793.)

Status: Current legislation

Text of statute as originally enacted

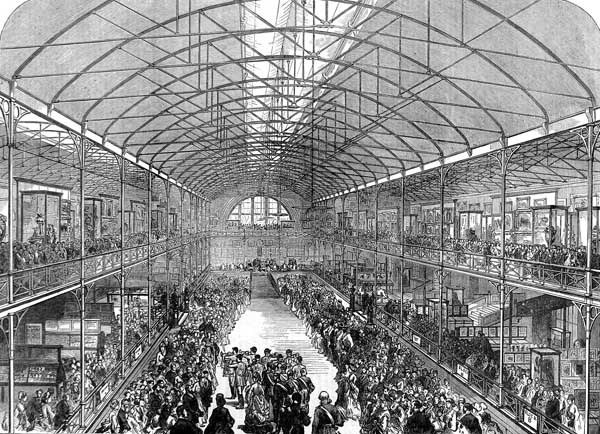
The official opening of the Bethnal Green Museum by the Prince of Wales in 1872.

The museum was founded in 1872 as the Bethnal Green Museum. The iron structure was a prefabricated building originally constructed at Albertopolis, South Kensington in 1856–7, which was displaced by the construction of early phases of the present V&A complex. The exterior elevations of the building were designed by James William Wild in red brick in a Rundbogenstil (round-arched) style very similar to that in contemporary Germany and using a cast iron structure manufactured by Charles Denoon Young and Company. The similarity to contemporary industrial structures led to the disparaging name of the building as the "Brompton Boilers". This effect is modified by mosaic panels along both long elevations illustrating agriculture, the arts and sciences; these were from designs by F. W. Moody and made by female students of the South Kensington Museum mosaic class.

In Bethnal Green, the building was used to display a variety of collections at different times. In the 19th century, it contained food and animal products, and various pieces of art including the works which can now be seen at the Wallace Collection. It was remodelled as an art museum following World War I, with a children's section which subsequently grew in size.

For many years some of the collection of the V&A's sculptures by Auguste Rodin, including those donated by the artist, were exhibited at Bethnal Green, alongside childhood-related dispays.

A white painted iron statue cast by John Bell in 1851, was displayed at Bethnal Green from 1927 to 2017. It came originally from the Great Exhibition of 1851. The Eagle slayer shows a marksman shooting at an eagle which has slain the lamb that lies at his feet. This is now on long-term loan to the Coalbrookdale Museum since it was cast in the Coalbrookdale Foundry.

The museum is a Grade II* listed building.

== Recent history ==
Interior of the museum in 2026

Young V&A has the largest collection of childhood related objects in the United Kingdom. In 1974 the director of the V&A, Sir Roy Strong, defined it as a specialist museum, re-displayed as The Museum of Childhood.

The mission of the museum today is stated as "To enable everyone, especially the young, to explore and enjoy the designed world, in particular objects made for and made by children." It has extensive collections of toys, childhood equipment and costumes, and stages a programme of temporary exhibitions.

The museum closed in October 2003 for extensive renovations of the roof structure, re-display of the collections, construction of a learning centre at the lower ground floor and the creation of a new entrance, costing £4.7 million. The entrance was designed by Caruso St John Architects. It reopened in December 2006.

In 2019 a further transformation of the museum began. "Over 30,000 objects which had been on display or in storage at the museum" were audited and packed. After temporary storage at South Kensington, they were to join the rest of the V&A East Museum at Stratford Waterfront "in a few years time". A new temporary exhibition gallery, shop, and learning centre were added. The museum reopened on 1 July 2023, rebranded as Young V&A.

In June 2023, museum director Tristram Hunt instructed the removal of two books on gender and sexual orientation and a poster from the charity Stonewall that read "Some people are trans, get over it!", from the museum ahead of its reopening. The V&A Staff LGBTQ Working Group and trade unions PCS and Prospect opposed the removals. Union representatives appealed the decision in a meeting with Hunt, who rejected their request to have the items returned to the museum.

== Awards and recognitions ==
The 2023 transformation of the museum earned a RIBA National Award for architects AOC Architecture and De Matos Ryan.

In 2024, Young V&A was awarded the Art Fund's Museum of the Year prize. In 2026 it received the Council of Europe Museum Prize for its inclusive programming for children.

== See also ==
- Anthony Burton (former director)

== Bibliography ==
Weinreb, Ben; Hibbert, Christopher; Keay, John; Keay, Julia, eds. (2008) [1983]. The London Encyclopaedia (Third ed.). Macmillan. ISBN 978-1-405-04924-5.
