= Nightingale Hospital (Marylebone) =

English mental hospital

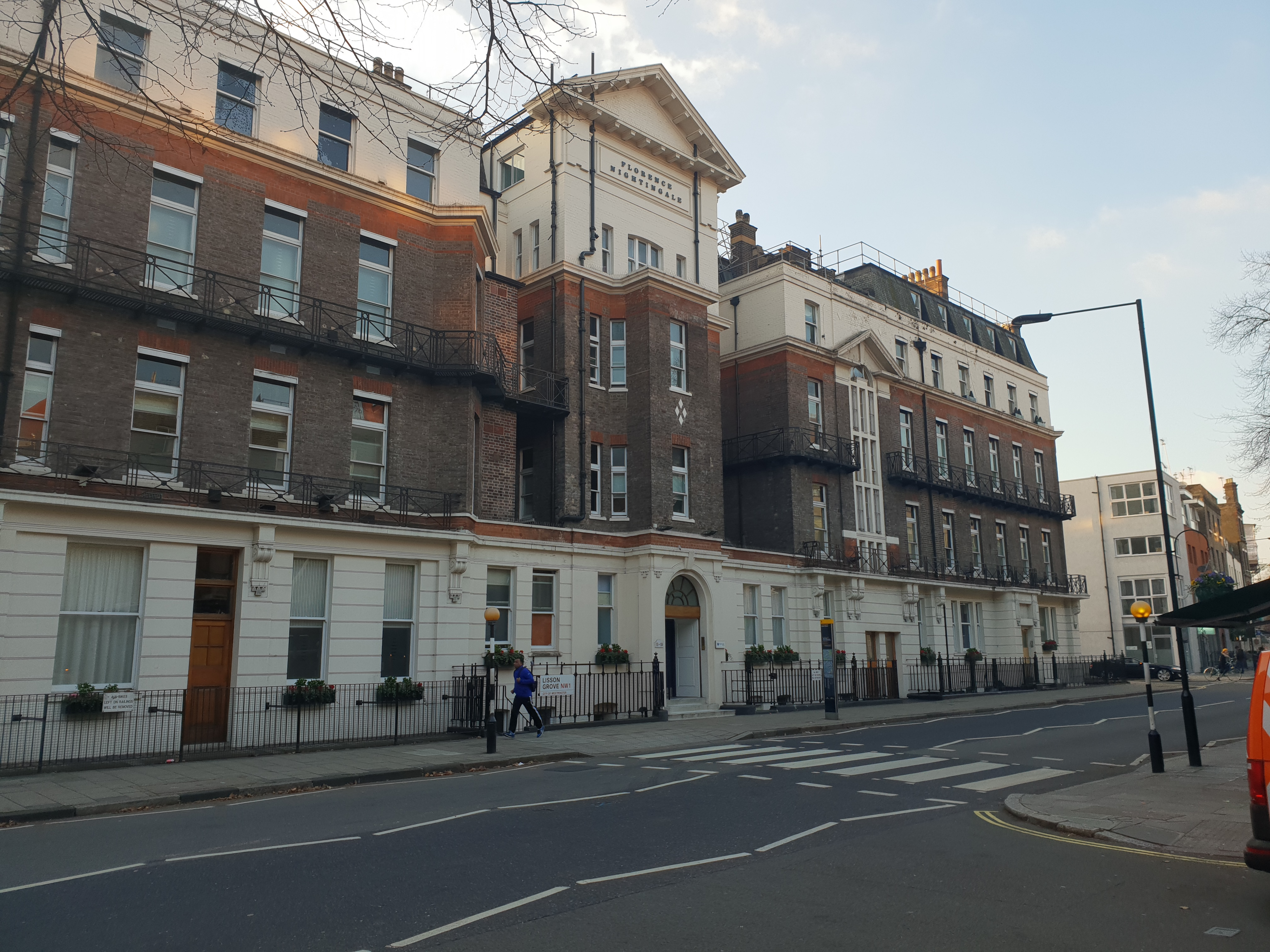
- Nightingale Hospital

- Location in Westminster

Geography
- Location: Lisson Grove, London, England, United Kingdom
- Coordinates: 51.5218°N 0.1652°W

Organisation
- Care system: Private
- Type: Psychiatric

Services
- Emergency department: No Accident & Emergency

History
- Founded: 1850

Links
- Lists: Hospitals in England

The Nightingale Hospital is a private mental health facility in Lisson Grove, Marylebone, London.

== History ==
The hospital has its origins in the "Establishment for Gentlewomen During Temporary Illness" founded at Cavendish Square in March 1850. On opening, it had 11 beds, and employed nurses as and when required. Florence Nightingale became superintendent in August 1853, a week before it moved to Harley Street, and installed hot water on all floors, and a windlass to deliver hot foods quickly from the kitchen to beds. Under her governance, it was made non-sectarian and renamed the "Institute for Gentlewomen During Illness", taking in widows and daughters of professionals, the clergy and military personnel. She left for the Crimean War the following year.

The foundation stone for a new purpose-built facility in Lisson Grove was laid by the Duchess of Albany in January 1909 and the new facility was officially opened by the Princess of Wales in March 1910. The hospital was renamed the "Florence Nightingale Hospital for Gentlewomen" after Florence Nightingale's death in August 1910. The hospital did not join the National Health Service in 1948 and instead was acquired by Bupa in 1978. After becoming a mental health provider in 1987, it was acquired by Capio Group in 1999 and by Groupe Sinoue-Sarl in 2014.

== Performance ==
The Care Quality Commission criticised the hospital after an inspection in January 2018 over lack of specialist substance misuse training for nurses, ligature and fire risks, medicines management, infection control and sharing learning from incidents. They found that "staff did not always know where the patients were in the hospital which was a potential risk for patients who might harm themselves or other people."

Three patients at the hospital died in 2017/8:

- Alan MacDonald, 61, killed himself in August 2017 four days after being discharged from the hospital. He spent two weeks as an in-patient at the hospital at a cost of £20,000. This included charges of £750 a day by the private clinic AddCounsel which had referred him to the hospital for daily visits by a counsellor on top of the hospital fees.
- Daisy Boyd, a sculptor, 28, took an overdose of cocaine on 5 October 2017 and suffocated herself with a plastic bag. The inquest into Boyd's death was told that visitors, described as “rich, entitled people who thought they were above the law”, brought a bag of cocaine into the hospital without challenge.
- Shaquelle Vidal, 23, the daughter of TV comedian, Ava Vidal, hanged herself using a laptop cable on 7 April 2018.

The Care Quality Commission re-inspected the hospital in 2019 when it was rated as good overall, although child and adolescent mental health wards (which are now closed) were rated as requires improvement.

== Sources ==
- Weinreb, Ben; Hibbert, Christopher; Keay, John; Keay, Julia, eds. (2008) [1983]. The London Encyclopaedia (Third ed.). Macmillan. ISBN 978-1-405-04924-5.
