= Philip Mansel =

British historian

Philip Robert Rhys Mansel (born October 19, 1951) is a British historian of courts and cities, and the author of a number of books about the history of France and the Ottoman Empire. He was born in London in 1951 and educated at Eton College, Balliol College, Oxford, and obtained a doctorate at University College London in 1978. He has lived in Paris, Istanbul and Beirut and now lives in London.

== Career ==
Philip Mansel's first book, Louis XVIII, was published in 1981 and this – together with subsequent works such as Paris Between Empires 1814–1852 (2001) – established him as an authority on the French monarchy, a fact recognised later by his appointment as Chevalier des Arts et Lettres. Seven of his books have been translated into French. In 2019 his book King of the World: The life of Louis XIV, was published in London by Penguin. It has been translated into Dutch, Italian, French and German and was published in the US in 2020 by UChicago.

Sultans in Splendour, with over 100 photographs on monarchs of the Middle East before 1945 was published in 1988, Constantinople: City of the World's Desire 1453–1924 in 1995 and Levant: Splendour and Catastrophe on the Mediterranean, about the history of Smyrna, Beirut and Alexandria, was published in 2010. The last two have been translated into Italian, Greek and Turkish.

In 2016, Mansel's book Aleppo: The Rise and Fall of Syria's Great Merchant City was released. The book features the author's history of the city in Part 1, as well as 15 primary source accounts in Part 2, collected from British and French consuls, merchants, scientists, and travelers to Aleppo over the past 400 years. A revised and updated paperback edition was published in 2018.

In 1995, Mansel was a co-founder of the Society for Court Studies, together with David Starkey, Robert Oresko and Simon Thurley. For 20 years he was the editor of the Society's journal, The Court Historian.

He is a Fellow of the Royal Historical Society, the Royal Society of Literature, the Institute of Historical Research (University of London), and the Royal Asiatic Society, and president of the Conseil Scientifique of the Centre de Recherche du Château de Versailles.

Mansel was awarded the London Library Life in Literature prize in 2012.

Over the past 30 years Mansel has contributed reviews and articles to a wide range of newspapers and journals, including History Today, The English Historical Review, The International Herald Tribune, The Guardian, The Daily Telegraph, The Independent and Apollo. Currently he writes for The Spectator, The Times Literary Supplement and Cornucopia.

Mansel has lectured all over the world – including the United States, France, Germany, Italy and Turkey – and has made a number of appearances on radio and television, including in the two-part Channel 4 documentary Harem and in Versailles (BBC2, 2012). He has been interviewed on French, Belgian, Turkish and Lebanese television.

== Books ==
- Louis XVIII (London, Blond and Briggs, 1981)
- Pillars of Monarchy: An Outline of the Political and Social History of Royal Guards, 1400–1984 (New York, Quartet Books, 1984)
- The Eagle in Splendour: Napoleon I and His Court (London, George Philip, 1987 - new edition, IBTauris, 2015)
- The Court of France: 1789–1830 (New York, Cambridge University Press, 1988)
- Sultans in Splendour: The Last Years of the Ottoman World (New York, Vendome, 1989)
- Constantinople: City of the World's Desire, 1453–1924 (New York, St. Martin's, 1995)
- The French Émigrés in Europe and the Struggle against Revolution: 1789–1814 (New York, St. Martin's Press, 1999) (Editor, with Kirsty Carpenter)
- Paris Between Empires, 1814–1852 (London, John Murray, 2001)
- Prince of Europe: the Life of Charles-Joseph de Ligne, 1735–1814 (London, Weidenfeld & Nicolson, 2003)
- Dressed to Rule: Royal and Court Costume from Louis XIV to Elizabeth II (New Haven, Yale University Press, 2005)
- Levant: Splendour and Catastrophe on the Mediterranean (London, John Murray, 2010)
- Monarchy and Exile: The Politics of Legitimacy from Marie de Médicis to Wilhelm II (London, Palgrave Macmillan, 2011) (Editor, with Torsten Riotte)
- Aleppo: The Rise and Fall of Syria's Great Merchant City (London, I.B.Tauris, 2016)
- King of the World: the Life of Louis XIV (Penguin, 2019)

== The Levantine Heritage Foundation ==
Philip Mansel is a trustee of the Levantine Heritage Foundation..
