= James Thorne (antiquary) =

English antiquary

James Thorne (1815–1881) was an English antiquary, best known for his Handbook to the Environs of London (1876).

== Early life ==
Thorne was, born in London in September 1815, was educated at a private school, and for several years afterwards worked as an artist. While a young man he supplied short articles on antiquarian subjects to the ‘Mirror,’ ‘Gentleman's Magazine,’ and other publications, the result of research in libraries and of frequent rambles through many districts of England.

== Career ==
In 1843 he became connected with Charles Knight and as they worked together for more than twenty-five years, the proof-sheets of Knight's compositions often deriving much advantage from the suggestions of his coadjutor.

Thorne contributed, under Knight's direction, many topographical articles to the second series of the ‘Penny Magazine,’ and wrote large portions, besides supplying many illustrations, of the four volumes, entitled ‘The Land we live in.’ Knight's series of weekly and monthly volumes comprised Thorne's volumes of ‘Rambles by Rivers.’ The first, describing ‘the Duddon, Mole, Adur, Arun, Wey, Lea, and Dove,’ appeared in 1844, with numerous woodcuts from the author's drawings. The second on ‘the Avon’ came out in 1845, with illustrations mostly by William Harvey, and the two volumes on ‘the Thames,’ with all their illustrations by Harvey, are dated 1847 and 1849. In these descriptions, as in all Thorne's writings, history and antiquity are pleasantly blended with ‘gleanings of fairy and folk lore.’ He was working editor of the two volumes on geography in ‘The Imperial Cyclopædia,’ 1852, and of the ‘English Cyclopædia,’ with its supplements, and for twenty-five years he wrote for the ‘Companion to the British Almanac.’ The reissue (1873) of the ‘Passages of a Working Life,’ by Charles Knight, contained an ‘introductory note’ by Thorne.

Thorne's energies were for several years devoted to the compilation of the two volumes of his ‘Handbook to the Environs of London,’ 1876. They were the result of ‘personal examination and inquiry,’ and must be consulted by every student of the scenery, or of the historic associations, of the buildings and remains for twenty miles around London. His great knowledge and immense industry are shown throughout its pages.

== Later life ==
At the time of his death he was engaged in preparing a new edition of Peter Cunningham's ‘Handbook of London.’ He thoroughly ‘revised the work, and added much fresh information and many illustrative quotations.’ The ‘revision’ was completed on an elaborate scale by Mr. Henry B. Wheatley, F.S.A., in 1891 (see preface to his London Past and Present). After a painful illness, lasting for nearly twelve months, Thorne died at 52 Fortess Road, Kentish Town, on 3 Sept. 1881, leaving a widow and several children in poor circumstances. Thorne was elected F.S.A. on 21 March 1872.

== Selected publications ==
- Handbook to the Environs of London. John Murray, London, 1876.
