= Levant: Splendour and Catastrophe on the Mediterranean =

Non-fiction book by Philip Mansel

First edition (publ. John Murray)

Levant: Splendour and Catastrophe on the Mediterranean is a non-fiction book by Philip Mansel.

The book discusses the development of the Levant region, with the cities of Alexandria, Beirut, and Smyrna (now İzmir) being the primary three cities catalogued, with all three being perceived as declined by the time of the book's publication. According to Mansel, nationalism caused these cities to decline from their previous splendour. Noel Malcolm of The Daily Telegraph stated that in regards to the three cities the book is "looking at what they had in common, and explaining how they rose and why they fell."

== Contents ==
The book's coverage of Smyrna ends in 1922 with the Turkish capture of Smyrna.

According to Malcolm the author has a "fiercely critical" attitude towards the Bombardment of Alexandria by the United Kingdom and that the book has "bitter pages" towards the Suez Crisis.

== Reception ==
Young stated that he wished there was post-1922 coverage of Smyrna/İzmir.

Noel Malcolm praised the "colossal" "strengths" of the work and the "clarity and precision" in the "major developments in political history". Malcolm stated that in regards to multiculturalism "This is much more than an exercise in nostalgia; it has, potentially, a message for the modern world." His sole critique was of historical events being "too easily lumped together". He recommended both this book and Constantinople: City of the World’s Desire.

Nicholas Doumanis of the University of New South Wales stated that "the great strength of his book is its ability to paint vivid portraits of societies that are unfamiliar to modern readers." He concluded that it is "a fine example of historical narrative."
