= Henry B. Wheatley =

British author, editor, and indexer

Henry Benjamin Wheatley FSA (1838 – 30 April 1917) was a British author, editor, and indexer. His London Past and Present was described as his most important work and "the standard dictionary of London."

== Life ==
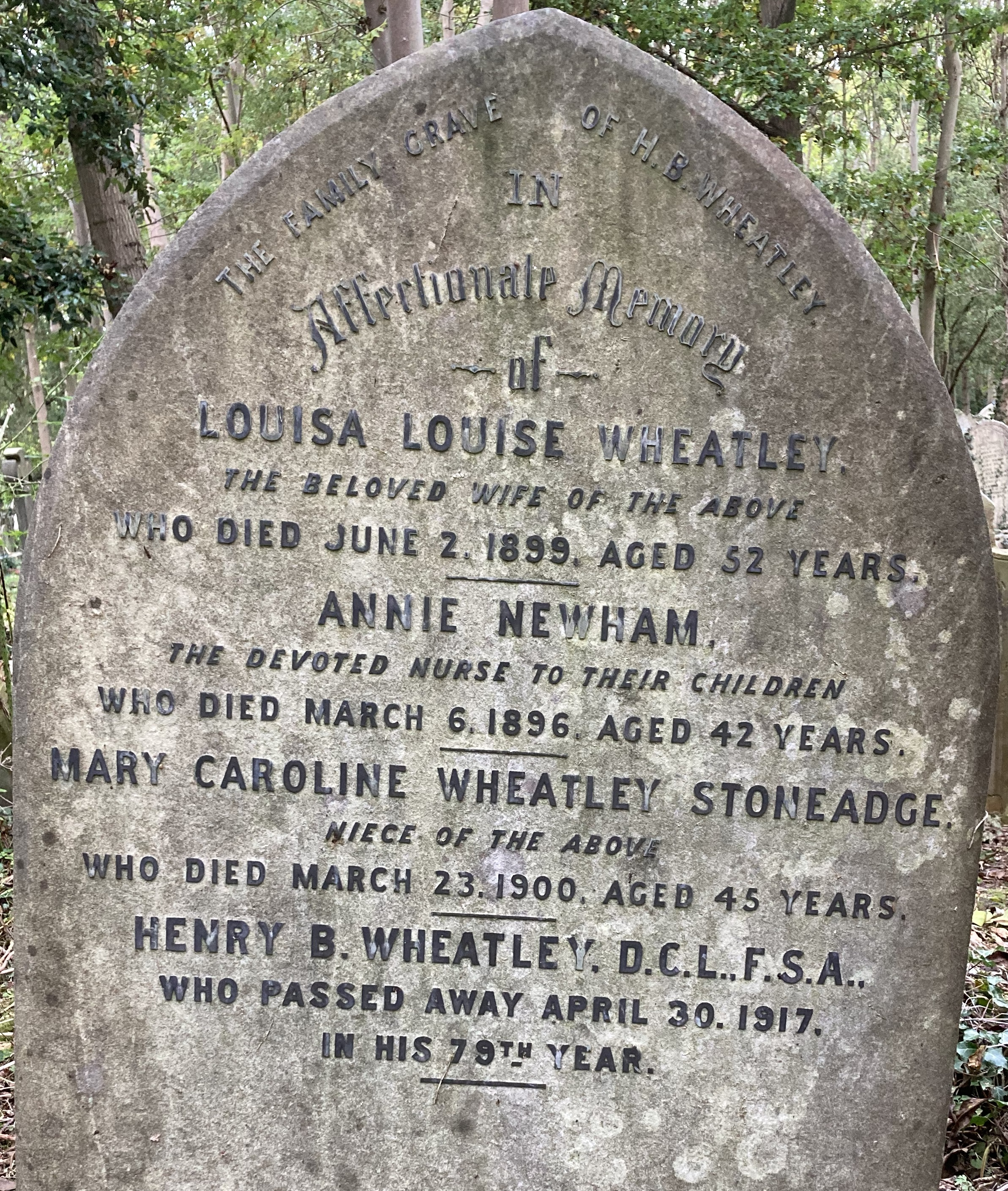
Family grave of Henry Benjamin Wheatley in Highgate Cemetery

He was a posthumous son of Benjamin Wheatley, an auctioneer, and his wife Madalina; the bibliographer Benjamin Robert Wheatley was his brother, and passed on expertise.

Wheatley was Assistant Secretary to Royal Society of Arts, 1879–1909; founding member (1903) and President of the Samuel Pepys Club, 1903–10; Vice-President of the Bibliographical Society, 1908–10, and its President 1911–13. In 1909 he was the President of the Sette of Odd Volumes, an English bibliophile dining-club.

He is buried in a family grave on the eastern side of Highgate Cemetery.

== Works ==
=== Articles ===
- Gomme, G. L. (1884). "Folk-Lore Terminology". Folk-Lore Journal. 2: 340–347. doi:10.1080/17442524.1884.10602756.
- "Celebrated Birthplaces: Samuel Johnson at Lichfield". The Antiquary: 233–239. December 1884.
- "Post-Restoration Quartos of Shakespeare's Plays". The Library. Third Series. 4 (15): 237–269. July 1913.

=== Books ===
- Of Anagrams: A Monograph Treating of Their History from the Earliest Ages to the Present Time. Williams & Norgate, 1862.
- "Round about Piccadilly and Pall Mall, or, A ramble from Haymarket to Hyde Park", 1870
- What is an Index?, 1878
- Samuel Pepys and the World He Lived In, 1880, 1st edition; online text, 5th edition, 1907 from hathitrust.org
- The Bibliographer, 1884.
- How to Form a Library. Published by Elliot Stock, London. 2nd edition 1886, 3rd edition 1887
- The Dedication of Books to Patron and Friend, 1887
- How to Catalogue a Library. Published by Elliot Stock, London. 1889.
- Remarkable bindings in the British Museum, 1889
- London Past and Present: Its History, Associations, and Traditions. John Murray, 1891.
- Reliques of Old London, George Bell & Sons, 1896. (descriptions of buildings with lithographs by Thomas Robert Way)
- How to Make an Index, 1902.
- The Story of London, [Mediæval Towns Series] 1904
- Literary Blunders, 1905

=== As editor ===
- Of the Orthographie and Congruitie of the Britain Tongue by Alexander Hume at Project Gutenberg, 1865; 2nd edition, 1870
- Editor, Books in Chains by William Blades (includes Wheatley's introduction and brief bio of Blades, whom he knew), 1892
- Diary by Samuel Pepys (1893) - annotator and editor
