= The Six Wives of Henry VIII (2001 TV series) =

- Genre: Documentary
- Written by: David Starkey
- Directed by: Steven Clarke (1); Mary Cranitch (2); Louise Wardle (3); Nicholas White (4)
- Presented by: David Starkey
- Composer: Andy Price
- Country of origin: United Kingdom
- Original language: English
- No. of series: 1
- No. of episodes: 4

Production
- Producers: Steven Clarke (1); Mary Cranitch (2); Louise Wardle (3); Nicholas White (4)
- Cinematography: Chris Openshaw; Jeremy Humphries; Vijay Waghmare
- Running time: 45-50 mins
- Production companies: United Productions; Channel 4

Original release
- Network: Channel 4
- Release: 10 September – 1 October 2001

The Six Wives of Henry VIII is a 2001 television documentary series about the wives of King Henry VIII presented by historian David Starkey from historic locations with added re-enactments.

== Principal cast ==
- Chris Larkin as Henry VIII, episodes one and two
- Andy Rashleigh as Henry VIII, episodes three and four
- Annabelle Dowler as Catherine of Aragon
- Julia Marsen as Anne Boleyn
- Charlotte Roach as Jane Seymour
- Catherine Siggins as Anne of Cleves
- Michelle Abrahams as Catherine Howard
- Caroline Lintott as Catherine Parr
- Michael Fitzgerald as Thomas Wolsey
- David Fleeshman as Thomas Cromwell
- Wilf Scolding as Thomas Culpeper
- Richard Felix as Thomas Seymour, 1st Baron Seymour of Sudeley
- Christopher Reeks as Thomas Cranmer
- Richard Syms as Stephen Gardiner

== Episodes ==
No. in series	Title	Directed by	Written by	Original release date
1	"Catherine of Aragon"	Steven Clarke	(David Starkey)	September 10, 2001
Spanish princess, Catherine of Aragon, marries Arthur, Prince of Wales in 1501. When he dies shortly after their marriage, she is left to fend for herself in the English court. Seven years later, Arthur’s younger brother Henry (who has become king) marries Catherine, Making for Peace with Spain and France. In a war with France, Catherine is a helpful strategist to her husband, the King. But after several years of marriage with only one living daughter, Princess Mary, and no surviving sons, Henry turns his attention to Anne Boleyn, one of Catherine’s ladies-in-waiting. After years of struggling against the Vatican and being denied an annulment, Henry breaks away from the Catholic Church. He creates the Church of England, in which he acts as Supreme Head on Earth, and divorces Catherine in order to marry Anne.
2	"Anne Boleyn"	Mary Cranitch	(David Starkey)	September 17, 2001
Having spent time in the Netherlands in Archduchess Margaret’s court, Anne Boleyn is knowledgeable of courtly ways. Her flirtatious nature and quick wit attract Henry, who initially seeks to make her his mistress. However, Anne refuses the role after seeing the outcome of what happened to her sister, Mary Boleyn, and makes it clear that she will not sleep with him until they are married and she is queen. During Henry’s struggle with the Vatican to end his marriage to Catherine, the English people come to dislike Anne, as they love Catherine and believe Anne is heretical in her religious beliefs of reform. After Henry starts the Church of England and divorces Catherine, he is free to marry Anne. Shortly after their marriage, a coronation is held for Anne, at which she is made Henry’s queen consort. A few months later, she gives birth to their daughter, Princess Elizabeth. Anne’s fiery temper and her inability to produce a male heir to the throne cause Henry to grow tired of her. In order to pursue a new wife, Henry believes rumors and accusations of Anne’s adultery, incest, and witchcraft. After her trial, she is judged by a jury of her peers, including her uncle Thomas Howard, 3rd Duke of Norfolk, and is found guilty. After a few days imprisonment in the Tower of London, she is beheaded.
3	"Jane Seymour and Anne of Cleves"	Louise Wardie	(David Starkey)	September 24, 2001
Just a few days after Anne’s execution, Henry marries Jane Seymour, a soft-spoken and obedient woman born from an aristocratic, political family. Jane had been one of Anne’s ladies-in-waiting, and after her execution, she forbids anyone to wear revealing French dresses, which pleases Henry. Because of her strong Catholic beliefs, many hoped she would bring the king back to the Catholic faith. However, Henry remains strong on his religious stance and continues his position as Supreme Head of the Church of England. While Jane is submissive and obedient, she continues to be politically active, even going as far as to restore Henry's first daughter, Princess Mary, to the throne, which Henry greatly discourages. Still, his love for her stays strong, and when she gives birth to a son, Prince Edward, Henry is overjoyed. However, Jane dies from complications just twelve days after Edward’s birth. Henry is devastated by the loss of his beloved wife. After a long period of mourning, Henry is encouraged to marry again in the hopes of producing another male heir. Thomas Cromwell, the king’s advisor, feels the Catholic German princess Anne of Cleves would be a good match. Henry will not agree to marry without first seeing what his prospective bride looks like, so Cromwell sends artist Hans Holbein the Younger to Germany to create a portrait of the princess. When he presents the finished product to Henry, the king is very pleased and agrees to marry her. Unfortunately, when she arrives in England and Henry sees her in person, he is revolted by her appearance. Nevertheless, he marries her at Cromwell’s convincing. The marriage only lasts six months, as Henry is unable to consummate their marriage because of Anne’s looks. He divorces her and, as a favor, allows her to legally be made his sister.
4	"Katherine Howard and Catherine Parr"	Nicholas White	(David Starkey)	October 1, 2001
Henry is once again encouraged to marry, as sets his eyes on Catherine Howard, an aristocratic sixteen-year-old girl who was a lady-in-waiting of Anne of Cleves. Catherine, who is the niece of the Duke of Norfolk and a cousin of the late Anne Boleyn, is flirtatious and promiscuous, and her energy makes the aging king feel lively. The early months of their marriage are happy, but Henry becomes upset when, after six months, she is still not pregnant. Catherine becomes involved with a handsome, young man named Thomas Culpeper. Rumors of her affair are brought to the king, who does not want to believe them but, after being given proof, has no choice. She is found guilty of presumptive treason and beheaded. Henry later becomes infatuated with the widowed Catherine Parr. However, she is in love with Thomas Seymour, 1st Baron Seymour of Sudeley, the late Jane Seymour’s brother. Henry sends Thomas away to Brussels on a diplomatic mission, allowing him to propose to Catherine. Feeling a sense of duty to complete the king and country’s conversion to Protestantism, Catherine agrees to marry Henry. Being an educated woman, Catherine publishes a book on her views of faith, which leads many to accuse her of heresy. However, she tells the king her opinions are only those of a woman and, therefore, mean nothing. Shortly after, King Henry dies, leaving her a widow once more. Now, however, she is free to marry Thomas Seymour. Sadly, she dies after giving birth to hers and Thomas’s daughter. She is buried at Suderly castle.

== Accolades ==
The series was nominated in the 2002 BAFTA Television Awards for the Huw Wheldon Award for Specialist Factual.
