= John Keay =

British historian, author and journalist (born 1941)

John Keay FRGS
- Born: 18 September 1941 (age 84); Barnstaple, England, United Kingdom
- Education: Ampleforth College
- Alma mater: Magdalen College, Oxford
- Occupations: Writer and historian
- Known for: Histories of colonial Asia
- Spouse(s): Julia Atkins (died 2011) Amanda Douglas (m. 2014)
- Children: Anna and 3 sons
- Parent(s): Stanley Keay; Jessie Keeping
- Relatives: Humphrey Atkins (father-in-law); Simon Thurley (son-in-law)

John Stanley Melville Keay FRGS (born 18 September 1941) is a British historian, journalist, radio presenter and lecturer specialising in popular histories of India, the Far East and China, often with a particular focus on their colonisation and exploration by Europeans. In particular, he is widely seen as a pre-eminent historian of British India. He is known both for stylistic flair and meticulous research into archival primary sources, including centuries-old unpublished sources.

The author of some twenty-five books, he also writes regularly for a number of prominent publications in Britain and Asia. He began his career with The Economist. He has received several major honours including the Sir Percy Sykes Memorial Medal. In 2019, he received an honorary doctorate, presented by Princess Anne, from the University of the Highlands and Islands in Scotland.

The Economist has called him "a gifted non-academic historian", the Yorkshire Post has called him "one of our most outstanding historians", The Independent has called his writing "exquisite" and The Guardian has described his historical analysis as "forensic" and his writing as "restrained yet powerful". He is a Fellow of the Royal Geographical Society. Keay lives in both Edinburgh and in Argyll in the West Highlands of Scotland and travels widely.

== Life and career ==
John Keay was born on 18 September 1941 in Barnstaple, Devon, England, to parents of Scottish origin. His father Stanley Walter Keay (1902–1972) was a master mariner and his mother Florence Jessie née Keeping (1905–1992) was a housewife. He studied at Ampleforth College in Yorkshire before going on to read Modern History at Magdalen College, Oxford, where he earned high honours. Among his teachers at Oxford were the historian A. J. P. Taylor and the future playwright Alan Bennett. In 1965 he visited India for the first time. He went to Kashmir for a fortnight's trout-fishing and liked it so much that he returned the following year, this time for six months.

It was during his second stay in Kashmir that Keay decided upon writing as a career. From India, he sent unsolicited articles to many British magazines and newspapers and eventually joined the staff of The Economist (1965–71) and returned to India often as its political correspondent. He also started contributing stories to BBC Radio.

In 1971, he gave up his correspondent's job to write his first book, Into India, which was published in 1973. Keay followed it with two volumes about the European exploration of the Western Himalayas in the 19th century: When Men and Mountains Meet (1977) and The Gilgit Game (1979). These two books were later combined into a single-volume paperback by John Murray. Alexander Gardner (1785–1877), the American adventurer and mercenary employed by the Sikh Empire, who is featured in Keay's 1977 and 1979 books, is the sole focus of his book, The Tartan Turban: In Search of Alexander Gardner, released in 2017.

In the 1980s he worked for BBC Radio as a writer and presenter, and made several documentary series for BBC Radio 3. He also made programmes for BBC Radio 4. During this time he wrote India Discovered, the story of how British colonialists came to find out about the great artefacts of Indian culture and architecture.

== Awards and recognition ==
John Keay's major books have all received strong positive reviews in leading publications in the UK, US, Asia and elsewhere. The professional recognition he has received has included the following:

- Fellow (FRGS), Royal Geographical Society, UK.
- Sir Percy Sykes Memorial Medal of the Royal Society for Asian Affairs, UK (2009).
- Honorary Doctorate from the University of the Highlands and Islands, Scotland (2019).
- Fellow, Royal Conservatoire of Scotland (2013–14).
- Fellow, University of Dundee, Scotland (2010–12).

== Family ==
His late first wife Julia Keay, née Atkins (1946–2011), was also a successful writer and historian. She was the daughter of the politician Humphrey Atkins. The historian Anna Keay is the daughter and second child of John and Julia Keay. John Keay also has three other children with Julia Keay: Alexander (born 1973), Nell (born 1977) and Samuel (born 1979). The architectural historian Simon Thurley is his son-in-law. In 2014, Keay married Amanda Douglas. Keay had an uncle who was an Indian Civil Service officer in British India.

== Bibliography ==
- Into India (John Murray 1973), ISBN 0-7195-2918-2
- When Men and Mountains Meet: The Explorers of the Western Himalayas, 1820–75 (John Murray 1977), ISBN 0-7195-3334-1
- The Gilgit Game: The Explorers of the Western Himalayas, 1865–95 (John Murray 1979), ISBN 0-7195-3569-7
- India Discovered: The Achievement of the British Raj (Windward 1981), ISBN 0-7112-0047-5
- Eccentric Travellers (John Murray 1982), ISBN 0-7195-3868-8
- Highland Drove (John Murray 1984), ISBN 0-7195-4105-0
- Explorers Extraordinary (John Murray 1985), ISBN 0-7195-4249-9
- The Royal Geographical Society History of World Exploration (Hamlyn 1991), ISBN 0-600-56819-9 (ed.)
- The Honourable Company: A History of the English East India Company (HarperCollins 1991), ISBN 0-00-217515-0
- The Robinson Book of Exploration (Robinson 1993), ISBN 1-85487-240-0 (ed.)
- Collins Encyclopaedia of Scotland (HarperCollins 1994), ISBN 0-00-255082-2 (ed. with Julia Keay)
- Indonesia: From Sabang to Merauke (Boxtree Ltd 1995), ISBN 1-85283-545-1
- Last Post: The End of Empire in the Far East (John Murray 1997), ISBN 0-7195-5346-6
- India: A History. New York City: Grove Press. 2000. ISBN 0-8021-3797-0.
- The Great Arc: The Dramatic Tale of How India Was Mapped and Everest Was Named (HarperCollins 2000), ISBN 0-00-257062-9
- Sowing the Wind: The Seeds of Conflict in the Middle East (John Murray 2003), ISBN 0-7195-5583-3
- The Spice Route: A History (John Murray 2005), ISBN 0-7195-6198-1
- Mad About the Mekong: Exploration and Empire in South East Asia (HarperCollins 2005), ISBN 0-00-711113-4
- China: A History (HarperCollins 2008), ISBN 978-0-00-722177-6
- The London Encyclopaedia, Ben Weinreb & Christopher Hibbert, Julia and John Keay with original photography by Matthew Weinreb, Macmillan Publishers, 3rd Revised edition 2008, ISBN 978-1-4050-4924-5
- The Tartan Turban: In Search of Alexander Gardner, (Kashi House 2017) ISBN 978-1911271000
- Himālaya: Exploring the Roof of the World, (Bloomsbury Publishing 2022) ISBN 9781408891155
