= Prince of Europe =

2003 book by Philip Mansel

Prince of Europe: the Life of Charles-Joseph de Ligne, 1735–1814 is a 2003 non-fiction book by Philip Mansel, concerning Charles-Joseph, 7th Prince of Ligne.

It is a new version of a work previously published in French, Le Prince de Ligne: Le Charmeur de l’Europe, with additional material added.

== Background ==
Mansel travelled to various cities to conduct research by looking at twenty-five historical archives. The locations include Brno, Czech Republic; Helsinki, Finland; Kraków, Poland; and Edinburgh, Scotland. Accordingly the book was the time of first publication of some letters written by the subject. Mansel includes a list of these archives at the end of the book.

The author's research was complicated by the fact that Ligne only put his own name in his writings in a period close to his death and that he, in the words of Derek Beales of Sidney Sussex College, University of Cambridge, "without compunction" changed his own letters before they were published.

In the words of Beales, the author perceives Ligne as symbolizing the Enlightenment "or of the last, uninhibited phase of the ancien regime", in a manner similar to how the majority of historians view Ligne. Beales wrote that "Mansel is reluctant to make a final assessment of Ligne."

== Reception ==
Beales wrote that it is "an elegant and lively book that is not only the first biography in English but the most reliable in any language."

Noel Malcolm of The Daily Telegraph argued the story had value, as while Ligne was not a "historically important person", he was still "historically "significant"" as one could learn about life in his time period. Malcolm also praised how the work is "overflowing with memorable incidents and characters, told with delicacy and great skill".

Simon Sebag Montefiore of The Sunday Times stated it is "a superbly funny, colourful and debauched journey" and that he "wished it had been twice as long."
