= The Society for Court Studies =

- Formation: September 1995
- Type: Learned society
- Purpose: Research
- Headquarters: London
- President: Glenn Richardson
- Website: courtstudies.org

The Society for Court Studies is a learned society that aims to stimulate and co-ordinate the study of royal, princely, and noble courts throughout history. The principal object of the Society is to examine courts from a multi-disciplinary perspective by focusing on a variety of areas such as architectural history, political history, military history, art history, cultural patronage, and the role of women in courts. The Society for Court Studies publishes its own scholarly and peer-reviewed journal, The Court Historian, which appears twice a year. It is a registered charity (no. 1115906).

== History ==
Interest in courts as political and cultural centres grew in the last decades of the twentieth century. Influential scholars such as Norbert Elias and Geoffrey Elton pointed at princely courts as promising areas of research, a call which began to be heeded in the 1970s and 1980s. The growing interest in court studies and the increasing number of scholars made it possible to create a forum dedicated to court studies. Thus, the Society for Court Studies was founded in London in September 1995 by David Starkey, Robert Oresko, Simon Thurley, and Philip Mansel. The launch was held at Banqueting House and attended by a wide range of scholars from different subjects, different stages in their careers, and different countries, emphasizing the multidisciplinary and international approach of court history. The committee of the society is also composed of scholars from a number of countries. A separate branch was established in North America in 1998. Membership is open to interested people from any country and to any discipline.

The current President and Chairman of the Society since 2025 is Glenn Richardson, who is a Professor of Early Modern History at St Mary's University, Twickenham. He is a distinguished scholar with numerous publications on Tudor England's political and cultural relations with Continental Europe and on European Renaissance monarchy. Other officers of the committee (2026) include John Murphy (Treasurer), Simon Lambe (Secretary), Hanna Sinclair (Conference Secretary), Emily Deal (Seminar Secretary), Fabian Persson (Social Media Officer), and Jonathan Spangler (Editor), and Philip Mansel (Editor Emeritus). On the Executive committee also sit Janet Dickinson, Andrew Barclay, Philippa Woodcock, Charles Farris as well as the Chairman of the Americas branch of the Society Anatole Upart and the Chairman for the European branch Bruno A Marthino.

The Society for Court Studies is linked since 2007 with the Centro Studi Europa delle Corti (Ferrara), 'the Centre de Recherche du Château de Versailles', La Corte en Europa Institute of the Independent University of Madrid and the Centro Studi delle Residenze Reali Sabaude (Reggia di Venaria Reale, Turin), in the Court Studies Forum.

== Presidents of the Society ==
Glenn Richardson 2025-

Helen Watanabe-O'Kelly 2017-2025

Clarissa Campbell Orr 2012-2017

Simon Thurley 2005-2012

David Starkey 1996-2005

== Activities ==
The Society for Court Studies organises conferences and a series of research seminars on aspects of court history, which are held three times a term in London (UK).

The Society has organized and co-organized a number of conferences over the years such as "Princes Consort in History", "The Key to Power? The Culture of Access in Early Modern Courts, 1400-1700", "Gifts and Perquisities", "Heirs and Spares", "Monarchy and Exile", and "Animals at Court".

In 2019 conferences and study days included "Performance, Royalty and the Court, 1500-1800" at the Paul Mellon Centre with the support of the Paul Mellon Centre and Birkbeck College.

The journal The Court Historian is peer-reviewed, ranked as yielding a 1 in the Norwegian register of scientific journals, and published by Taylor & Francis.
