= Dressed to Rule =

2005 non-fiction book by Philip Mansel

Dressed to Rule: Royal and Court Costume from Louis XIV to Elizabeth II is a 2005 non-fiction book by Philip Mansel, published by Yale University Press.

Roy Strong in The Spectator stated that the main topic is "the complex relationship of dress to power". Philip F. Riley of James Madison University stated that the book highlights how fashion was a tool to "inspire respect, promote nationalism, and command obedience" by heads of government. The book covers the years 1660 to the date of publication.

== Contents ==
The book includes 69 illustrations.

== Reception ==
Riley stated that it is an "engaging enquiry", and a "well-written study".

Roy Strong of The Spectator praised how the book is "hugely readable and important book charting new territory which is only just beginning to be explored", but criticised the editing by the publisher, arguing that it did not give adequate illustrations.

Publishers Weekly wrote that the book is well-suited to "casual readers" but that a lack of a proper structure and "the superficial attention given to many periods and places" may frustrate more specialised ones.
