= Collins Encyclopaedia of Scotland =

Reference work published by HarperCollins, edited by John and Julia Keay

The cover of the 2nd edition of the Encyclopaedia

Collins Encyclopaedia of Scotland is a reference work published by HarperCollins, edited by the husband and wife team, John and Julia Keay.

== History ==
Scots had provided the impetus for a number of well-known references works, Chambers Dictionary and Encyclopædia Britannica amongst them (the latter still uses a thistle as a logo), but hitherto there had been no general purpose Scottish encyclopaedia.

== Statistics ==
The encyclopaedia took seven years to compile and has appeared in two editions. The first edition, published in 1994, contained about a million words, nearly five hundred illustrations, and had 126 contributors, ranging from Derick Thomson to David Steel, from Alan Bold to Neil MacCormick and from Joy Hendry to Sir William Macpherson of Cluny. It has four thousand individual entries, and an index indicating further references in other articles.

== Articles ==
In the original edition, the first entry is Aaron Scotus, and the last on the marquisate of Zetland (the only Z entry).

The aim seems to have been to have reasonably brief entries on most topics, but subjects that get lengthier ones, include Scotland's major cities (including the traditional city of Perth), association football and rugby in Scotland, the Scottish Gaelic language, Scots law etc. A wide variety of topics are dealt with, including figures from science, literature, philosophy, sport and history.

Less "obvious" topics which have entries include the Roman general Agricola (who tried to invade Scotland), the hooded crow, Berwick-upon-Tweed (which has a stormy past, lying right on the Anglo-Scottish Border) and medicinal plants.

Several appendices cover the schisms (and mergers) of Scottish Presbyterian factions from 1700 to the date of publication, and also the Scottish royal line.

== Second edition ==
The second edition in 2000 contained over a hundred new articles, amongst them, ones on Billy Bremner the footballer, Dolly the Sheep, the Scottish Parliament and the politician John Smith.

== See also ==
- Gazetteer for Scotland
