= Himalaya: Exploring the Roof of the World =

2022 book by John Keay

- Author: John Keay
- Language: English
- Subject: Anthropology, History
- Genre: Nonfiction
- Published: 2022
- Publisher: Bloomsbury Publishing
- Publication place: United Kingdom
- Media type: Hardcover
- Pages: 432
- ISBN: 978-1526660527

Himalaya: Exploring the Roof of the World is a non-fiction book by John Keay, a British historian and journalist.

== Overview ==
In this book, Keay provides a comprehensive overview of the Himalayan range, delving into its geological formation, cultural heritage, and the diverse communities that inhabit its slopes.

== Reception ==
Writing for the Washington Independent Review of Books, A.A. Bastion writes, "Keay goes out of his way to present the Asian perspective on Himālaya, including the religious beliefs that shape locals’ engagement with the area. He finds meaning in these stories and honors their role in the lives of those who live in the region, while nonetheless separating fact (connected to an observable reality) from fiction (created by perception and belief). This is hard to do, but he has taken care here."

Mandira Nayar of The Week (Indian magazine) writes, "At 81, Keay chose to get to know the Himalayas, in his words “the bruised area’’ in the map of Asia, without leaving his chair. [The book] is a breathtaking journey into the history, culture, ecology, archaeology and environment of the region."

Writing for the Asian Review of Books, Maximillian Morch writes, "This is a wonderfully digressive read, with rich portraits and stories of those who made their careers and fame from Himalaya. Keay has condensed an immense amount of data and information into the book alongside a deft selection of poetry, literature, period sources and a wide array of maps and photographs."

C. P. W. Gammell wrote in Literary Review, "In his new book, Himalaya, in prose that feels as effortless as it is entertaining, Keay paints a quite fascinating picture of this magical region, covering everything from geology, glaciers, tectonic plates and botany to the spiritual and religious evolution of humans."
