= Anthony Burton (curator) =

British museum curator

Anthony Burton is a former director of the V&A Museum of Childhood and an expert on the history of childhood.

Burton worked for the museum from 1968 to 2002. He spent sixteen years as head of the Museum of Childhood at Bethnal Green, after which he returned to South Kensington where he was involved in the museum's oral history project, taking recollections from former members of staff.

Burton is a visiting lecturer at Kingston University, London.

== Selected publications ==
- Children's Pleasures. London: Victoria & Albert Museum, 1996. ISBN 1851771743
- Bethnal Green Museum of Childhood London: Victoria & Albert Museum, 2nd revised edition, 1997. ISBN 1851771328
- Vision & Accident: The story of the Victoria & Albert Museum. London: Victoria & Albert Museum, 1999. ISBN 1851772928
- The Great Exhibitor: The Life and Work of Henry Cole. London: Victoria & Albert Museum, 2003. (With Elizabeth Bonython) ISBN 0810965755
