= Aleppo: The Rise and Fall of Syria's Great Merchant City =

2016 nonfiction book by Philip Mansel

- Author: Philip Mansel
- Publisher: I.B. Tauris
- Publication date: February 28, 2016
- ISBN: 9780857727190

Aleppo: The Rise and Fall of Syria's Great Merchant City is a non-fiction book by Philip Mansel, published by I.B.Tauris in 2016. It concerns the city of Aleppo and how it changed from a more prosperous and cosmopolitan city to a war-torn environment, covering a time period of 1516 to 2016.

== Contents ==
The text is divided into two parts. The first part, "A History," details a history of Aleppo from 1516 to the book's publication time (2016). The second part, "Through Traveller's Eyes," is a collection of travel writing from various time periods, with accounts written by people from the Western world such as Gertrude Bell, Leonard Woolley, Leonhard Rauwolff, Jean-Baptiste Tavernier, Alexander Russell, Francis Vernon, James Silk Buckingham, Frederick Walpole, and Francis William Newman.

== Publication history ==
Aleppo was first published by I.B. Tauris in the United Kingdom in February 2016. An Italian translation, published by LEG edizioni, and a Turkish translation, published by Everest Publications, were both released in 2017. In 2018, an updated English paperback edition was published by the original publication company.

== Reception ==
Justin Marozzi of The Spectator wrote that the author "goes about his business in a style at once accomplished, entertaining and idiosyncratic." Marozzi concluded that the "Elegant and elegiac" book "is a precious monument to a once-splendid city that has been reduced to abject ruin and misery."

Elif Shafak of the Financial Times wrote that the author has a genuine passion for Aleppo and "offers a unique perspective on the cultures around the Mediterranean." Shafak concluded that it is "an eloquently written book that at times reads like an elegy to Aleppo’s bazaars, embracing worldview and cultural diversity."
