= The Churchills (TV series) =

2012 British TV documentary

- Genre: Documentary
- Written by: David Starkey
- Directed by: David Sington
- Presented by: David Starkey
- Voices of: Timothy West as Winston Churchill
- Composer: Phillip Sheppard
- Country of origin: United Kingdom
- Original language: English
- No. of series: 1
- No. of episodes: 3

Production
- Executive producer: David Sington
- Producer: Heather Walsh
- Cinematography: Clive North; Iain Philpott
- Running time: 45-50 mins
- Production company: Red House Dox

Original release
- Network: Channel 4
- Release: 26 July – 9 August 2012

The Churchills is a 2012 three-part documentary written and presented by David Starkey that tells the story of two great war leaders Winston Churchill and his ancestor John Churchill, 1st Duke of Marlborough and the striking similarities in their lives.

Starkey argues throughout that it was Winston's absorption in the 17th century that helped him to be the first to recognise the menace of a new European hegemony, warning Parliament about the Nazis before Hitler had even come to power.

== Episode one: The Choice ==
The first programme in the series tells how Winston Churchill came to write "Marlborough: His Life and Times", his four-volume biography of his ancestor John Churchill written over ten years when he was in the political wilderness as a back bench MP between 1929 and 1938.

The first volume and this episode describes how John Churchill rose from obscurity to be the right-hand man of James II of England when his sister Arabella became mistress to James. During the religious differences between Catholic France and Protestant Holland and the tensions in England with a catholic King and a Protestant parliament, John Churchill chose political principles over personal loyalty and betrayed James, He joined William III and Mary II in the Glorious Revolution that set Britain on the course to democracy, and committed her to war with Louis XIV of France.

== Episode two: The March to War ==
Volume two of his book on Marlborough concentrates on events following the Treaty of Ryswick and the pacifism sweeping Britain just as it was in 1930s Britain following the Treaty of Versailles with no wish to fight more wars. Winston Churchill had visited Munich in 1932 and saw the rise of the Nazi Germany leading to a new war. William of Orange died and Queen Anne came to power and Marlborough previously sidelined, as was Winston Churchill, came to the fore to fight the French and its expansionist ideas culminating in the Battle of Blenheim. Volume two was published in October 1934 and a copy presented to Stanley Baldwin, Prime Minister of a coalition government.

== Episode three: Grand Strategies ==
Volume three of his book on Marlborough highlighted the Battle of Ramillies when Marlborough's use of concentrated cavalry routed the French army and destroyed the morale of the French nation. The tactics of concentrated German tanks on the same battlefield of Belgium in the Second World War had the same effect leading Winston Churchill to abandon France. Needing his own Grand Alliance to defeat Hitler Churchill cultivated his friendship with Franklin D. Roosevelt and when America entered the war it was Churchill's strategy that prevailed over American generals who wanted to open a front in Northern France as early as 1942. Churchill recognised from his experiences as soldier that German forces were too strong in France and had to be weakened by supplying the Russians fighting on the Eastern Front, bombing German industry and attacking German forces in Africa and Italy. This strategy led to a weakening of German troops in Normandy and led to the success of D Day in 1944.
