= Monarchy (TV series) =

British documentary series

- Monarchy title card
- Genre: History
- Presented by: David Starkey
- Country of origin: United Kingdom
- Original language: English
- No. of episodes: 17

Production
- Running time: 48 minutes
- Production company: Granada Productions

Original release
- Network: Channel Four
- Release: 18 October 2004 – 26 December 2007

Monarchy is a Channel 4 British TV series by British academic David Starkey charting the political and ideological history of the English monarchy from Anglo-Saxon England to modern history. The show also aired on PBS stations throughout the United States, courtesy of PBS-member station WNET. In Australia, all four seasons were broadcast on ABC1 from May 2005 onwards.

== Episodes ==
Series	Episodes	Originally released	
Series	Episodes	First released	Last released
1	6	18 October 2004	22 November 2004
2	5	12 September 2005	10 October 2005
3	5	13 November 2006	11 December 2006
4	1	26 December 2007	26 December 2007

=== Series 1 ===
No. overall	No. in series	Title	Directed by	Written by	Original release date
1	1	"A Nation State"	David Wilson	David Starkey	18 October 2004
After the withdrawal of the Roman Empire from Britain, the Anglo-Saxons become the next conquerors and eventually begin the creation of England.
2	2	"Ængla Land"	David Wilson	David Starkey	25 October 2004
The rise of the Anglo-Saxons, the wars against the Vikings and the victory over King Harold by the Norman Duke William the Conqueror at the Battle of Hastings.
3	3	"Conquest"	David Hutt	David Starkey	1 November 2004
Following the Battle of Hastings and subsequent Norman Conquest. This covers a tumultuous time in English history, which saw murders and eventually, civil war. The story of all of the English monarchs of the House of Normandy.
4	4	"Dynasty"	Mary Cranitch	David Starkey	8 November 2004
The reign of the Angevins Henry II of England, and his conflict with the Archbishop of Canterbury, Thomas Becket, the corrupted reign of King John and the long struggled reign of Henry III.
5	5	"A United Kingdom"	Lucy Swingler	David Starkey	15 November 2004
The reigns of three Edwards: Edward I, and his attempt at a United Kingdom, how his son Edward II almost lost it all, but restored by Edward III, grandson of Edward I.
6	6	"Death of a Dynasty"	Lucy Swingler	David Starkey	22 November 2004
Follows the reigns made famous by Shakespeare: Richard II, Henry IV, Henry V and Henry VI. A time of civil unrest and doubt in monarchy itself.

=== Series 2 ===
No. overall	No. in series	Title	Directed by	Written by	Original release date
7	1	"The Crown Imperial"	Steven Clarke	David Starkey	12 September 2005
The Wars of the Roses and the birth of the Tudors.
8	2	"King and Emperor"	David Hutt	David Starkey	19 September 2005
The reign of Henry VIII, his divorces and resulting dissociation with Rome, which led to the dissolution of the monasteries.
9	3	"The Shadow of the King"	David Hutt	David Starkey	26 September 2005
Following the death of Henry VIII and the Act of Succession of 1543, which allowed all three of his children to rule. Edward VI, Mary I, and Elizabeth I.
10	4	"The Stuart Succession"	James Runcie	David Starkey	3 October 2005
With the defeat of the Spanish Armada, the English royalty was at its zenith. Scotland and England became united under the Stuart King James I (VI of Scotland), but his son Charles I within a generation would throw the country into civil war.
11	5	"Cromwell The King Killer"	James Runcie	David Starkey	10 October 2005
1644, the English Civil War was at its height and monarchy - indisputable before the war - was under threat.

=== Series 3 ===
No. overall	No. in series	Title	Directed by	Written by	Original release date
12	1	"The Return of the King"	David Barrie	David Starkey	13 November 2006
Starting in 1660 with the return from exile of King Charles II. By aligning his throne with Catholic France and Protestant Parliament, Charles's reign restored the authority of the English crown and laid the foundation of the world's first modern state.
13	2	"The Glorious Revolution"	James Burge	David Starkey	20 November 2006
Looking at the "Bloodless Revolution" of 1688, the Parliament-devised plot to overthrow England's last Roman Catholic King, James II, and replace him with his Dutch Protestant son-in-law William of Orange.
14	3	"Rule Britannia"	Rachel Bell	David Starkey	27 November 2006
In just 25 years after the Glorious Revolution of 1688, England was transformed from an insignificant minor state to become part of the greatest power in Europe: Great Britain.
15	4	"Empire"	Simon Everson	David Starkey	4 December 2006
In 1714, an obscure German Prince was crowned King George I of Great Britain, signalling the beginning of a new political era that saw the rise of the new role of the Prime Minister, and established the pattern of political modernity we are familiar with today.
16	5	"Survival"	Jamie Muir	David Starkey	11 December 2006
When, in 1789, the Bastille prison in Paris was stormed and the French Revolution began, few in Britain - least of all King George III, who was recovering from one of his bouts of madness - thought that it would lead to a cataclysmic war with France.

=== Series 4 ===
No. overall	No. in series	Title	Directed by	Written by	Original release date
17	1	"The House of Windsor"	James Burge	David Starkey	26 December 2007
Death of Queen Victoria, to present day. Speculation on the path of King Charles III or King George VII.
