= European Heritage Heads Forum =

Informal EU exchange forum

EHHF
- Founded: 2006
- Type: Intergovernmental Forum
- Focus: Cultural Heritage
- Region served: Europe
- Headquarters: Brussels, Belgium
- Website: www.ehhf.eu

The European Heritage Heads Forum (EHHF) is an informal professional and expert network that brings together the heads of the European state heritage authorities (built heritage, landscapes, archaeology, etc.) to share knowledge and ideas, promoting consistency in the management of the historic environment in the 21st century. The heads are primarily the directors-general of the departments responsible for immovable heritage within the relevant national ministries (e.g., the Ministry of Culture and Environment).

Discussion centres on emerging trends, political engagement, European legislation and the scope of international heritage protection and how these affect national heritage policies and impact upon historic monuments, sites and urban centres. The Council of Europe, the European Commission, as well as the representatives of civil society, are associated with the activities of the EHHF by attending the annual meetings and encouraging the impact assessment of the cultural heritage sector at the EU level. The EHHF acts as an advocate for heritage and produces strong statements on specific issues to support common concerns.

== History ==
A European Heritage Summit was first organised in London from 26 to 28 April 2006 by Dr. Simon Thurley, former Chief Executive Officer of English Heritage. The mission of the Summit was to gather European heritage leaders for the first time, allowing them to exchange experiences and initiate common actions. It was attended by representatives from 23 European states, which agreed in the Final Statement to continue meeting annually as a forum of European heritage leaders, known as the “European Heritage Heads Forum.” Different countries have successively hosted the following EHHF annual meetings.

In May 2014, the EHHF's annual meeting was attended by representatives from a record 26 European states.

== The EHHF Troika ==
The steering committee of the EHHF is a Troika composed of the head, or heads, of heritage from the country which hosted the annual meeting in the previous year and the heads of the countries which will host the subsequent two meetings. The host of the next annual meeting chairs the troika meetings. Future hosting countries are chosen by general agreement at the annual meeting.

== The EHHF Secretariat ==
The EHHF Secretariat reports to the Troika and is responsible for organising the annual meetings, circulating information to EHHF members, following up on the actions agreed by the EHHF, maintaining the EHHF website and upholding the original purpose for the informal meeting of the heads of the European heritage agencies to:

- Exchange experience, ideas and good practice
- Strengthen and support existing European networks dealing with immovable heritage
- Carry out specific agreed actions (e.g. formulating harmonised heritage indicators to be used at EU level)

Since January 2014, a permanent administrative secretary has been appointed to manage the EHHF Secretariat alongside the Troika members. The permanent Secretariat is based in Brussels, within the offices of the Flanders Heritage Agency, and is funded by annual contributions from EHHF members, as agreed upon at the meeting in Oslo in May 2013.

== Annual Meetings ==
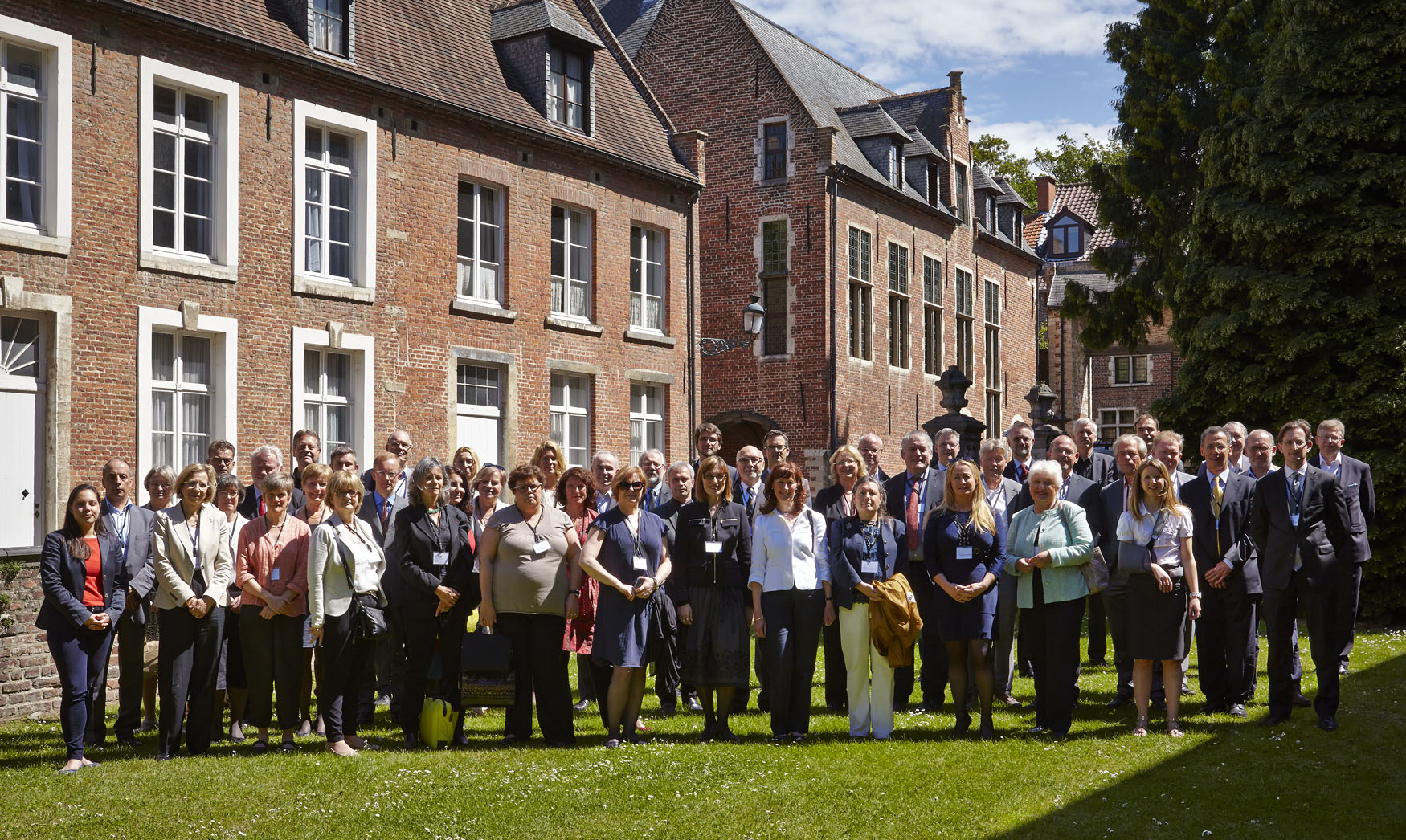
EHHF Annual Meeting, 2014 (Leuven, Belgium)

Year	Hosting Head	Country
2006	Simon THURLEY, Chief Executive, English Heritage	London, United Kingdom
2007	Pavel JERIE, Director-General, Czech National Institute for the Protection and Conservation of Monuments and Sites	Prague, Czech Republic
2008	Steen HVASS, Director-General, Heritage Agency of Denmark	Copenhagen, Denmark
2009	Eva-Maria HOHLE, President, Austrian Federal Office for the Protection of Monuments Katarína KOSOVA, Director-General, Monuments Board of the Slovak Republic	Vienna, Austria Bratislava, Slovakia
2010	Philippe BÉLAVAL, Director-General, Direction générale des Patrimoines|Heritage, Ministry of Culture and Communication (France)	Paris, France
2011	Cees VAN 'T VEEN, Director, Cultural Heritage Agency of The Netherlands	Amsterdam, the Netherlands
2012	Gerd WEISS, President, Association of State Conservators in the Federal Republic of Germany	Potsdam, Germany
2013	Jørn HOLME, Director, Norwegian Directorate for Cultural Heritage	Oslo, Norway
2014	Sonja VANBLAERE, Administrator general, Flanders Heritage Agency Pierre PAQUET, General Inspector, Department of Heritage, Wallonia Thierry WAUTERS, Director, Department of Monuments and Sites, Brussels	Leuven, Belgium
2015	Niall O’DONNCHU, Assistant Secretary Heritage Division, Department of Arts, Heritage and the Gaeltacht	Dublin, Ireland
2016	Oliver MARTIN, Head of Section, Cultural Heritage and Historic Monuments, Swiss Federal Office of Culture	Bern, Switzerland
2017	Kristín Huld SIGURDARDOTTIR, Director General, The Cultural Heritage Agency of Iceland	Reykjavik, Iceland
2018	Patrick SANAVIA, Director, Service des Sites et Monuments Nationaux, Ministry of Culture	Luxembourg

== The European Heritage Legal Forum ==
The European Heritage Legal Forum (EHLF) was founded in 2008 following the EHHF annual meeting held in Copenhagen, Denmark. The heads agreed in their Final Statement to the creation of a sub-committee to improve their capacity for early identification of EU legislation which may pose a potential threat to cultural heritage. A forum of legal experts appointed by the national competent authorities was subsequently formed, which reports to the EHHF. The mission of the EHLF is to ensure that relevant information on the development and potential consequences of proposed legislation developed by the European Union is circulated in a timely manner to heritage state authorities. In addition to this monitoring task, the EHLF may make recommendations to the EHHF for revised wording of the draft legislation and possible exemptions for cultural heritage.
