= Magna Carta: The True Story Behind the Charter =

2015 book by David Starkey

- First edition
- Author: David Starkey
- Subject: British politics, history
- Genre: Non-fiction
- Publisher: Hodder & Stoughton
- Publication date: January 1, 2015
- Publication place: United Kingdom
- Pages: 304
- ISBN: 978-1473610057
- Preceded by: Introduction to Fatal Colours: Towton 1461 – England's Most Brutal Battle by George Goodwin (2011)

Magna Carta: The True Story Behind the Charter is a book by historian David Starkey. It was published in 2015 by Hodder & Stoughton. The book tells the story of the writing of the royal charter of rights Magna Carta. Starkey writes about its background, its history and what he believes is so great and important about it.

== Background ==
2015 was the 800th anniversary of the first issuing of Magna Carta. To coincide with this, new academic works on the subject were published and events held to mark the anniversary. Starkey presented a one-hour BBC documentary on Magna Carta, and it was accompanied by a book published by Hodder and Stoughton.

In the documentary, Starkey argues that Magna Carta is a foundational stone of the rule of law and a basis constitutions because he believes states tends towards being "arrogance, corruption and conflict with its people", while the citizens tend towards being “disorderly, irrational and bloody-minded”. Starkey writes that Magna Carta is essential in keeping peace and constraints on the state and the citizen population and says that it is this rather shaky 800 year old document that has led to a "constitutional edifice" developing in the UK.

== Synopsis ==
Starkey starts by describing the origins of Magna Carta. He tells the story of the warring parties and the fight involved in the creation and writing of the charter. He argues that the story of the birth of English constitutional government is much murkier and more complicated than the general view that it had been born at Runnymede on 15 June 1215. Nevertheless, Starkey writes that this symbolised a great English capacity to find peaceful compromise in politics.

The book mostly focuses on telling the story behind the charter, how the barons forced King John to seal the charter. The story follows the differences between the original Magna Carta of 1215 and the subsequent Magna Carta of November 1216 which followed the death of King John a month before.

Starkey concludes the book by writing about his views on the political implications of Magna Carta in present-day politics. He believes that the modern UK state appears to be fragmenting and would be helped by the core principles of the charter with a new charter of liberties or a new William Marshal figure.

== Reception ==
The book received positive and negative feedback. Gerard DeGroot of The Times reviewed the book favourably, saying that Starkey is "a perceptive historian with a populist's ability to communicate... admirable for its lucidity and brevity; this book is all that most people will need to know about the epochal charter and its legacy. Starkey also has the courage and imagination to interpret Magna Carta in a manner that has profound meaning for the world of today."

Frank MacGabhann of The Irish Times was very positive about the book, saying that it was "scholarly yet accessible. Analytical yet clear, it is a pleasure to read."

In Speculum, medieval historian James Masschaele took a more critical review. He noted that while Starkey's 2015 book aimed to be "a short and lively account of the key events" Masschaele concluded that "A short and accessible introduction to Magna Carta suitable for lower-level undergraduate survey courses would certainly be a welcome addition to the literature, but on balance it is hard to view Starkey’s book as an entirely satisfactory option in this regard." Starkey's book included "anachronistic turns of phrase" and the review criticised Starkey's understanding of the barons as republicans and his "jarring screed against modern society".

Another more critical view on the book was Marcus Tanner of The Independent. He was particularly critical of its closing chapters which he found far less persuasive than the rest of the book. This pertained to Starkey's view that the present British state is fragmenting and needed another William Marshal. Tanner contested this point, arguing that the problem in 1215 was the over-concentration of power in one person, which is not the case in present-day politics. Tanner argued on the contrary that he believed the real problem nowadays is that nobody knows who is actually in power, whether it is big corporations or parliament or the EU. This, he argued is exemplified by the fact that so many people think voting is pointless because it won't make a difference, due to power being so distributed in modern politics.
