= Anna Keay =

British historian, author and broadcaster (born 1974)

Anna Keay OBE
- Born: August 1974 (age 52); Scotland, United Kingdom
- Education: Doctor of Philosophy
- Alma mater: University of Oxford; University of London
- Occupations: Historian, author, broadcaster
- Years active: 1996–present
- Employer(s): The Landmark Trust (Director, 2012–present)
- Spouse: Simon Thurley (m. 2008)
- Children: 2
- Parent(s): John Keay; Julia Atkins
- Relatives: Humphrey Atkins (grandfather)
- Website: www.annakeay.co.uk

Anna Julia Keay OBE (born August 1974) is a British historian, author and broadcaster. Since 2012, she has served as director of The Landmark Trust.

== Early life and education ==
Keay grew up in a remote home in the West Highlands, the daughter of authors John Keay and Julia (Atkins) Keay. She is the granddaughter of Conservative politician and former chief whip Humphrey Atkins.

She was educated at Oban High School in Argyll and the private Bedales School. She then read history at Magdalen College, Oxford.

She subsequently studied for a PhD degree at Queen Mary, University of London; her thesis, The Ceremonies of Charles II's Court, was completed in 2004.

== Career ==
Keay worked for English Heritage from 2002 to 2012, after seven years as Assistant Curator of the Historic Royal Palaces, responsible for Hampton Court, the Banqueting House, Whitehall, and the Tower of London. As its Director of Properties Presentation, she was involved in the restoration of the Elizabethan Garden at Kenilworth Castle, which featured in a 2009 BBC television series about English Heritage.

She has served as director of The Landmark Trust since 2012.

She appeared on BBC Radio 4's The Museum of Curiosity in October 2014. Her hypothetical donation to this fictional museum was St Edward's Crown, part of the British Crown Jewels.

She co-presented The Buildings That Shaped Britain on Channel 5. She later appeared on The Coronation and The Queen's Palaces.

Keay is Trustee of the Royal Collection Trust and the Pilgrim Trust.

In 2026 Keay was appointed by Charles III as the official biographer of his late mother, Queen Elizabeth II. She is the first woman to serve as an official biographer to a British monarch.

== Personal life ==
Keay married fellow historian Simon Thurley in 2008. The couple have a daughter and a son, non-identical twins, born in 2008. The family live in London and Norfolk.

== Awards and honours ==
- Keay was appointed Officer of the Order of the British Empire (OBE) in the 2019 Birthday Honours for services to heritage.
- She was shortlisted for the 2022 Baillie Gifford Prize for The Restless Republic.
- She received the Duff Cooper Prize in 2022.

== Selected publications ==
- The Earl of Essex: The Life and Death of a Tudor Traitor (2001, Historic Royal Palaces, ISBN 978-1873993156)
- Elizabethan Tower of London (London Topographical Society, 2001, ISBN 978-0902087446)
- The Magnificent Monarch: Charles II and the Ceremonies of Power (2008, Bloomsbury, ISBN 978-1847252258)
- Monarchy and Exile: The Politics of Legitimacy from Marie de Médicis to Wilhelm II (edited by P. Mansel (Editor), T. Riotte) (contributed one chapter) (2011, Palgrave Macmillan ISBN 978-0230249059)
- The Crown Jewels: The Official Illustrated History (2012, Thames & Hudson, ISBN 978-0500289822)
- The Elizabethan Garden at Kenilworth Castle (2013, English Heritage, ISBN 978-1848020344)
- Landmark: A History of Britain in 50 Buildings with Caroline Stanford, (2015, France Lincoln, ISBN 978-0711236455)
- The Last Royal Rebel: The Life and Death of James, Duke of Monmouth (2017, Bloomsbury)
- The Restless Republic: Britain without a crown (2022, William Collins, ISBN 978-0008282042)
- Interregnum: The People’s Republic of Britain (2022, William Collins, ISBN 978-0008282028)
