= Paris Between Empires, 1814–1852 =

2001 book by Philip Mansel

- Title page for Paris Between Empires, 1814–1852 (2001)
- Author: Philip Mansel
- Language: English
- Genre: History
- Publisher: John Murray
- Publication date: 2001
- Publication place: United Kingdom

Paris Between Empires 1814 -1852 is a non-fiction book by Philip Mansel about Paris in the period 1814–1852. It was published by John Murray (London, 2001) and St. Martin's Press (New York, 2003).

== Contents ==
Pamela Philbeam of History Today described the book as covering multiple "specific themes". As the chapters are organised by said themes, David Baguley of the University of Durham stated that overall the "method of the book is as much thematic as chronological".

The first chapter, 'Death of an Empire', shows the Napoleonic Wars and highlights military conflicts involving the city. Baguley described the style as "an engaging, novelistic fashion" that "sets the tone and establishes the theme". According to Baguley, there is a lack of "urban history" depicted. The final chapter is titled 'Birth of an Empire: Versailles, 18 January 1851', something Baguley described as "a very summary account of the Second Empire" and argues is "somewhat [confusing]" and "rather too convenient opposition to the first chapter".

The interior illustrations are in black and white while the cover is in colour. The source notes make up in excess of 80 pages.

== Reception ==
Robert O'Bryne of the Irish Times wrote "here is a book which deserves nothing but praise for its readability, its erudition and its entertainment - an all-too-rare trio of qualities."

Philbeam wrote that the author's "strength lies in his imaginative reconstruction of places" and that the "skill" of successfully depicting an "atmosphere and detail of the life-style of the rich" is "The real charm of this book". She wished the interior illustrations were in colour and that the book covered the period of change in the city's architecture.

Baguley concluded the work is "enlightening, entertaining and thoroughly readable" and praised the "impressive" "erudition" that "is never vaunted".

== See also ==
- History of Paris
