= The Court Historian =

- Discipline: History
- Language: English
- Edited by: Jonathan Spangler

Publication details
- History: 1996-present
- Publisher: The Society for Court Studies (United Kingdom)
- Frequency: Biannual

Standard abbreviations
- ISO 4: Court Hist.

Indexing
- ISSN: 1462-9712
- OCLC no.: 43272438

Links
- Journal homepage

The Court Historian is a peer-reviewed academic journal published by The Society for Court Studies covering research in the field of court history. The journal is published twice a year and features articles on the history of royal and princely courts from the late Middle Ages to the present. As well as articles and book reviews, each issue contains a Miscellany section, covering materials and media of interest to students of the court, including books, exhibitions, exhibition and sales catalogs, compact discs, concerts and live performances of opera and theatre. The journal also features a bibliography of recently published books.

== History ==
The Court Historian started as a newsletter. From the fourth volume on the format was changed to include full-length articles with a complete scholarly apparatus of footnotes, tables, and appendices.
