= David Starkey =

English constitutional historian (born 1945)

David Starkey CBE
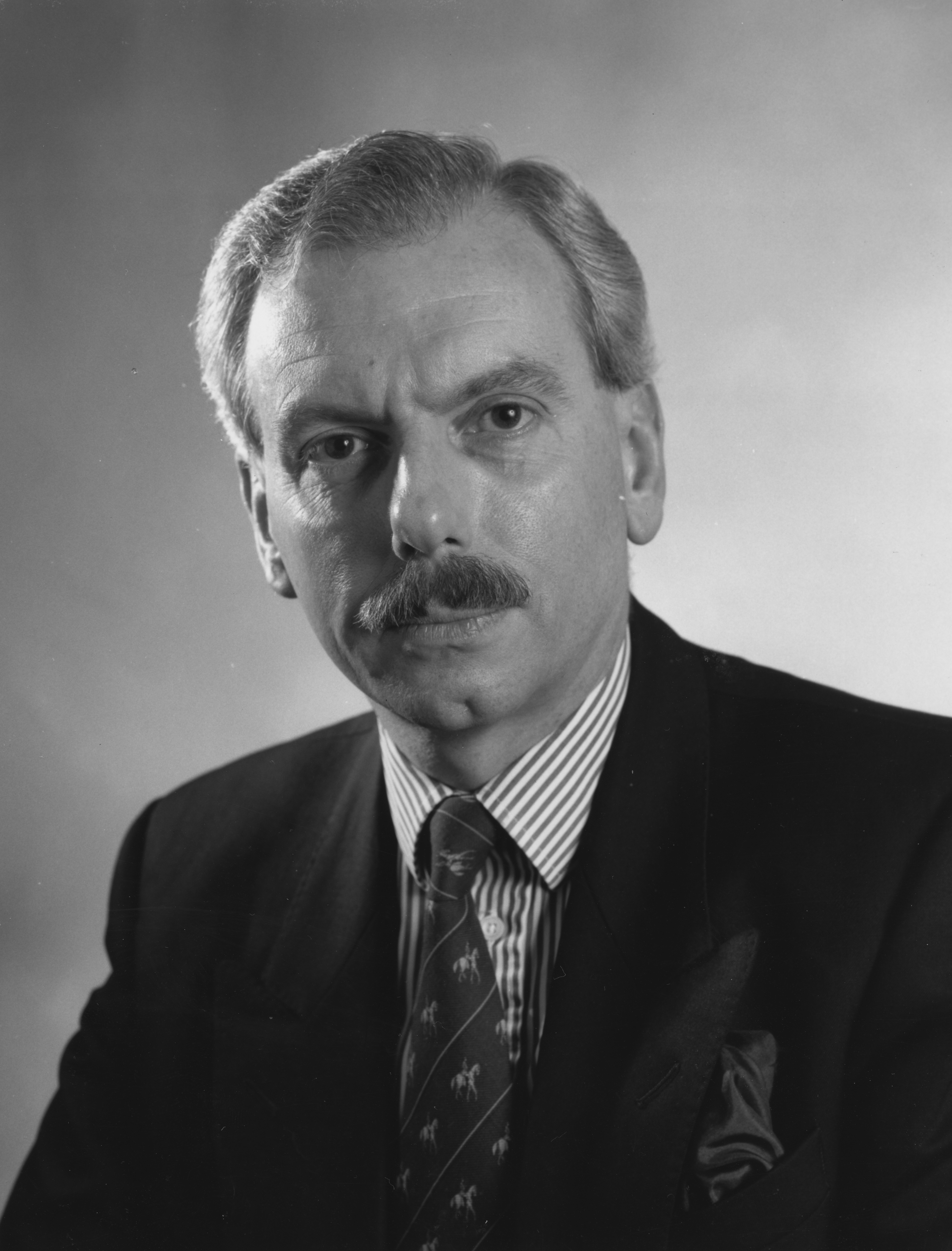
- Starkey when a lecturer at LSE in the early 1980s
- Born: David Robert Starkey; 3 January 1945 (age 81); Kendal, Westmorland, England
- Education: Fitzwilliam College, Cambridge (BA, PhD)
- Occupations: Historian; television personality
- Partner: James Brown (from 1994; died 2015)
- Website: davidstarkey.com

David Robert Starkey CBE (born 3 January 1945) is an English historian, radio and television presenter, with views that he describes as conservative. The only child of Quaker parents, he attended Kendal Grammar School before reading history at Cambridge on a scholarship. There he specialised in Tudor history, writing a thesis on King Henry VIII's household. From Cambridge, he moved to the London School of Economics, where he was a lecturer in history until 1998. He has written several books on the Tudors.

Starkey first appeared on television in 1977. While a regular contributor to the BBC Radio 4 debate programme The Moral Maze, his acerbic tongue earned him the sobriquet of "rudest man in Britain"; his frequent appearances on Question Time have been received with criticism and applause. Starkey has presented several historical documentaries. In 2002, he signed a £2 million contract with Channel 4 for 25 hours of programming, and in 2011 was a contributor on the Channel 4 series Jamie's Dream School.

Starkey was widely censured for a comment he made during a podcast interview with Darren Grimes in June 2020 that was said to be racist, for which he later apologised. Immediately afterwards, he resigned as an honorary fellow of his alma mater, Fitzwilliam College, had several honorary doctorates and fellowships revoked, book contracts and memberships of learned societies cancelled, and his Medlicott Medal withdrawn.

== Early years and education ==
Starkey was born on 3 January 1945 in Kendal, Westmorland. He is the only child of Robert Starkey and Elsie Lyon, Quakers who had married 10 years previously in Bolton, at a Friends meeting house. His father, the son of a cotton spinner, was a foreman in a washing-machine factory, while his mother followed in her father's footsteps and became a cotton weaver and later a cleaner. They were both born in Oldham and moved to Kendal in the 1930s during the Great Depression. He was raised in an austere and frugal environment of near-poverty, with his parents often unemployed for long periods of time; an environment which, he later stated, taught him "the value of money". Starkey is equivocal about his mother, describing her as both "wonderful", in that she helped develop his ambition, and "monstrous", intellectually frustrated and living through her son. "She was a wonderful but also very frightening parent. Finally, she was a Pygmalion. She wanted a creature, she wanted something she had made." Her dominance contrasted sharply to his father, who was "poetic, reflective, rather solitary...as a father he was weak." Their relationship was "distant", but improved after his mother's death in 1977.

Starkey was born with two club feet. One was fixed early, while the other had to be operated on several times. He also suffered from polio. He suffered a nervous breakdown at secondary school, aged 13, and was taken by his mother to a boarding house in Southport, where he spent several months recovering. Starkey blamed the episode on the unfamiliar experience of being in a "highly competitive environment". He ultimately excelled at Kendal Grammar School, winning debating prizes and appearing in school plays.

The Tudors simply is this – it is a most glorious and wonderful soap opera. It makes the House of Windsor look like a dolls house tea party, it really does. And so these huge personalities, you know, the whole future of countries turn on what one man feels like when he gets out of bed in the morning – just a wonderful, wonderful personalisation of politics.

— David Starkey

Although he showed an early inclination towards science, he chose instead to study history. A scholarship enabled his entry into Fitzwilliam College, Cambridge, where he gained a first-class degree, a PhD and a fellowship.

Starkey was fascinated by King Henry VIII, and his doctoral thesis focused on the Tudor monarch's inner household. His supervisor was Professor Sir Geoffrey Elton, an expert on the Tudor period. Starkey claimed that with age his mentor became "tetchy" and "arrogant". In 1983, when Elton was awarded a knighthood, Starkey derided one of his essays, Cromwell Redivivus, and Elton responded by writing an "absolutely shocking" review of a collection of essays Starkey had edited. Starkey later expressed his remorse over the spat: "I regret that the thing happened at all."

== Career ==
Starkey was a fellow at Fitzwilliam College, Cambridge, from 1970 to 1972. Bored at Cambridge and attracted to London's gay scene, he secured a position as a lecturer in the Department of International History at the London School of Economics in 1972. He claimed to be an "excessively enthusiastic advocate of promiscuity", seeking to liberate himself from his mother, who strongly disapproved of his homosexuality. He ended his 30-year career as a university teacher in 1998, later citing boredom and irritation with the administrative demands of modern academic life. Having already written and presented the 1984 Channel 4 documentary series This Land of England, he began to write and present several history documentaries for BBC television, beginning with the Indie Award winning Henry VIII (1998).

Starkey had already achieved notoriety as a panellist on the BBC Radio 4 debate programme The Moral Maze, debating moral issues of the day alongside fellow panellists Rabbi Hugo Gryn, Sir Roger Scruton and the journalist Janet Daley since 1992. He soon acquired a reputation for abrasiveness. He explained in 2007 that his personality possesses "a tendency towards showmanship... towards self-indulgence and explosion and repartee and occasional silliness and going over the top." The Daily Mail gave him the sobriquet of "the rudest man in Britain", to which Starkey was said to have told friends, "Don't worry darlings, it's worth at least £100,000 a year", claiming that his character was part of a "convenient image". He once attacked George Austin, the Archdeacon of York, over "his fatness, his smugness, and his pomposity", but after a nine-year stint on the programme he left, citing his boredom with being "Dr. Rude" and its move to an evening slot.

From 1995, he also spent three years at Talk Radio UK, presenting Starkey on Saturday, later Starkey on Sunday. An interview with Denis Healey proved to be one of his most embarrassing moments: "I mistakenly thought that he had become an amiable old buffer who would engage in amusing conversation, and he tore me limb from limb. I laugh about it now, but I didn't feel like laughing about it at the time."

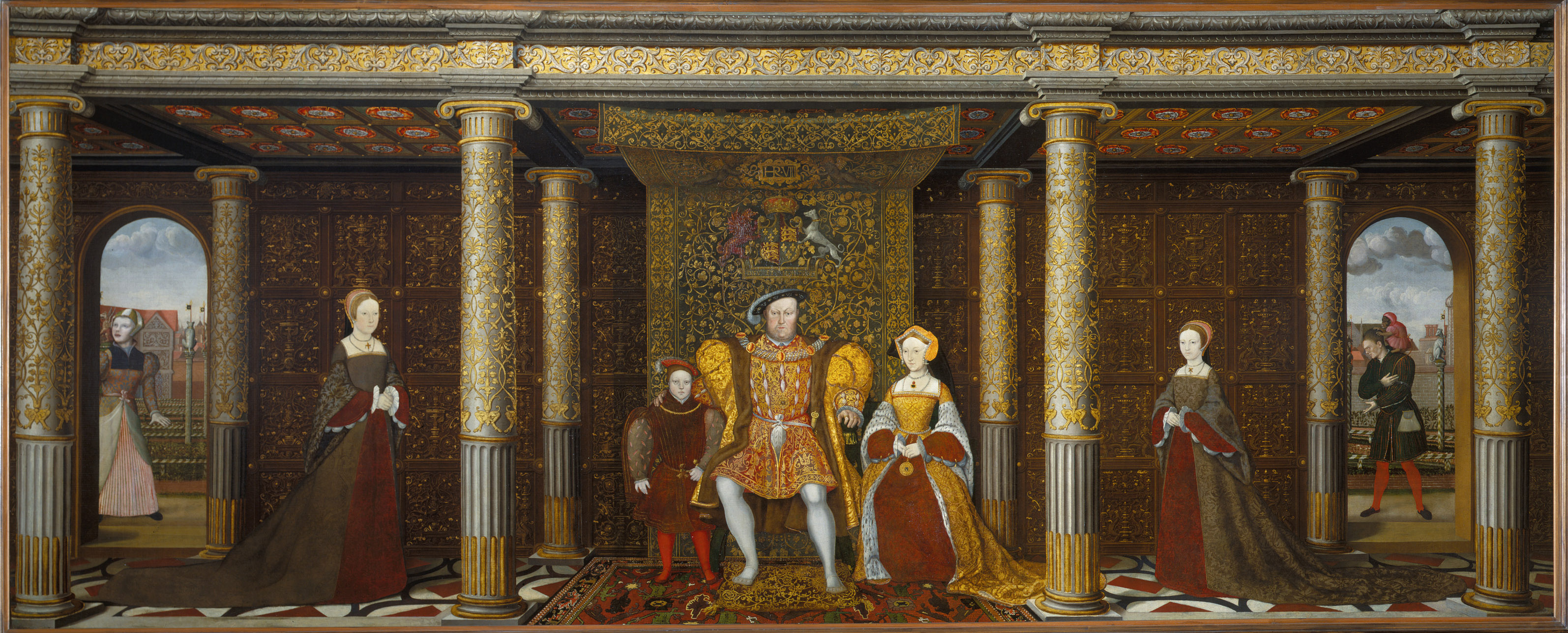
Starkey is well known for his historical analyses of Henry VIII and his Court

His first television appearance was in 1977, on Granada Television's Behave Yourself with Russell Harty. He was a prosecution witness in the 1984 ITV programme The Trial of Richard III, whose jury acquitted the king of the murder of the Princes in the Tower on the grounds of insufficient evidence. His television documentaries on The Six Wives of Henry VIII and Elizabeth I were ratings successes. His breathless delivery of the script, with noticeable breaths and choppy cadence, is widely imitated.

In 2002, he signed a £2 million contract with Channel 4 to produce 25 hours of television, including Monarchy, a chronicle of the history of English kings and queens from Anglo-Saxon times onward. He presented the 2009 series Henry: Mind of a Tyrant, which Brian Viner, a reviewer for the Independent, called "highly fascinating", although A. A. Gill was less complimentary, calling it "Hello! history". In an interview about the series for the Radio Times, Starkey complained that too many historians had focused not on Henry, but on his wives. Referring to a "feminised history", he said: "so many of the writers who write about this are women and so much of their audience is a female audience." This prompted the historian Lucy Worsley to describe his comments as misogynistic. More recently, in 2011, he taught five history lessons in Channel 4's Jamie's Dream School, after which he criticised the state education system.

The core of history is narrative and biography. And the way history has been presented in the curriculum for the last 25 years is very different. The importance of knowledge has been downgraded. Instead the argument has been that it's all about skills. Supposedly, what you are trying to do with children is inculcate them with the analytical skills of the historian. Now this seems to me to be the most goddamn awful way to approach any subject, and also the most dangerous, and one, of course, that panders to all sorts of easy assumptions – 'oh we've got the internet, we don't need knowledge anymore because it's so easy to look things up'. Oh no it isn't. In order to think, you actually need the information in your mind.

— David Starkey

In 1984, Starkey was elected a Fellow of the Royal Historical Society and in 1994 a Fellow of the Society of Antiquaries of London. He was also made an Honorary Fellow by his Cambridge College, Fitzwilliam College in 2006. From 2007 to 2015 he was Honorary Visiting Professor of History at the University of Kent and subsequently Lecturer at Goldsmiths' College (2017), Visiting Professor of History of Canterbury Christ Church University (2018–20) and Honorary Professor of History at the University of Buckingham (2019–20). He has worked as curator on several exhibitions, including an exhibit in 2003 on Elizabeth I, following which he had lunch with her namesake, Elizabeth II. Several years later he told a reporter that the monarch had no interest in her predecessors, other than those who followed her great-grandfather, Edward VII. "I don't think she's at all comfortable with anybody – I would hesitate to use the word intellectual – but it's useful. I think she's got elements a bit like Goebbels in her attitude to culture – you remember: 'every time I hear the word culture I reach for my revolver.' I think the queen reaches for her mask." His remarks were criticised by Penny Junor, a royal biographer, and Robert Lacey, a royal historian.

On 25 June 2012, Starkey gave his lecture 'Head of Our Morality: why the twentieth-century British monarchy matters' at The Marc Fitch Lectures.

== Views ==
=== Political views ===
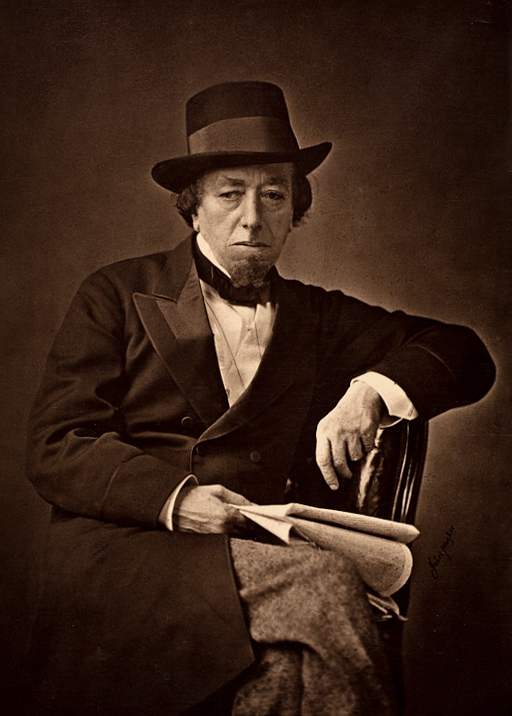
Benjamin Disraeli by Cornelius Jabez Hughes, 1878.

Starkey's political views have changed over the years from what he called "middle-of-the-road Labour left until the end of the 1970s" to a conservative outlook, which he attributed to economic failures of the Callaghan government. Starkey blamed the Callaghan administration for "blow[ing] the nation's finances". He is a supporter of one-nation conservatism and believes that Victorian Prime Minister Benjamin Disraeli was a great symbol of this. He has written that Disraeli was "exotic, slippery and had a gift for language and phrase-making", drawing similarities with the rhetorical style of former UK Prime Minister Boris Johnson. He argues that the working classes need more explicit "nationalism" of the type demonstrated by Disraeli. He believes that Disraelianism could strengthen the Anglo-American "conservative" alliance between US and the UK. Despite Johnson being a Conservative Prime Minister, Starkey regarded him as "a liberal", so he doubted whether Johnson would ever take this view.

During the 1980s he was an active Conservative Party member, and he was a Conservative candidate for Islington Borough Council in 1986 in Tollington ward, and in 1990 in Hillrise ward.

Following Labour's victory in the 1997 general election, he bemoaned the Conservatives in opposition, criticising Michael Howard in particular: "I knew Michael Howard was going to be a disaster as soon as he opposed top-up fees, either out of sentimentality or calculated expediency so that it might get him a bit of the student vote...Instead of backing Tony Blair, causing revolution in the Labour Party, the Conservatives have been whoring after strange gods, coming up with increasingly strange policies." He likened Gordon Brown to the fictional Kenneth Widmerpool, continuing, "It seems to me that with Brown there is a complete sense of humour and charm bypass." Of Ed Miliband, in 2015 he said "He is a man of high ambition and low talent – the worst possible combination. His whole language at the moment is soak the rich, hate the rich."

During the 2011 Conservative Party Conference he spoke at a fringe meeting, declaring Mayor Boris Johnson to be a "jester-despot" and the Prime Minister, David Cameron, as having "absolutely no strategy" for running the country. He urged the party to re-engage with the working class rather than the "Guardian-reading middle class". In 2015 he said that while Cameron and his Chancellor, George Osborne, had introduced some meaningful reforms to education and welfare policies, they had not made large enough cuts to the UK's budget deficit.

Starkey prefers radical changes to the UK's constitution in line with the federal system used by the United States, although in an interview with Iain Dale he expressed his support for the monarchy, the Queen and Prince Charles. In the run-up to the UK Alternative Vote referendum, he was a signatory on a letter to The Times, which urged people to vote against the proposals. Starkey thinks the modern UK House of Commons has become a weak political institution and that it should return to its core value of being in defiance of state authority, as it was in its origin. He believes the House too often gives way to the state, such as with the police being allowed to search the place without a warrant. This occurred in 2008 with the searching of the Westminster office of Conservative politician Damian Green after the custodians of the House, the Speaker and the Serjeant at Arms, allowed the police to search the place without a warrant.

Starkey was a supporter of the Tory Campaign for Homosexual Equality ("Torche"), (Note: Starkey later resigned from this post.) and during one of many appearances on the BBC's Question Time he criticised Jeffrey Archer over his views on the age of homosexual consent. In 2012, he described himself as "torn" on the issue of same-sex marriage, describing marriage as "part of the baggage of heterosexual society."

In 2009, Mike Russell, then the Scottish Government Minister for Culture and External Affairs, called on him to apologise for his declaration on the programme that Scotland, Ireland and Wales are "feeble little countries". Starkey responded that it had been a joke regarding the lack of necessity for the English to outwardly celebrate their nationalism, approvingly quoting H. G. Wells's observation that "the English are the only nation without national dress". He described Alex Salmond, then Scottish First Minister, as a "Caledonian Hitler" who thinks that "the English, like the Jews, are everywhere". In August 2014, Starkey was one of 200 public figures who were signatories to a letter to The Guardian expressing their hope that Scotland would vote to remain part of the United Kingdom in September's referendum on that issue. In June 2015 in an interview for The Sunday Times Starkey compared the Scottish National Party (SNP) with the Nazi Party. He said:

You have as a symbol the twisted cross: the saltire or the swastika. You have a passionate belief in self-sufficiency: known by the Nazis as autarky and the Scots as oil. And also you have the propensity of your elderly and middle-aged supporters to expose their knees.

SNP member of parliament Kirsten Oswald described Starkey's comments as "deeply offensive" to the Jewish community and SNP voters, and described Starkey as a "serial utterer of bile and bilge".

=== European Union ===
Starkey is very critical of the European Union (EU). As a result, he supported the "Leave" vote in the 2016 EU referendum. This is because, Starkey argues, the United Kingdom is best off as a self-governing nation, and the EU conflicts with this notion of self-government.

As a historian, Starkey presents Brexit in a wider historical context to try to show its importance in British history. He makes comparisons between Brexit and Henry VIII's split from Rome and the Reformation that followed. He believes the Reformation sowed the seeds of Euroscepticism, particularly in England, and the nation's "semi-detached relationship with continental Europe". This had its origin with Henry VIII because "nobody before Henry would make any argument about England being much different from the rest of Europe. It was Henry who turns England into a defensible island, who literally fortifies the English coastline. It really is Henry that turns England into a genuine island." He claimed that Henry VIII could be considered the first Brexiteer. As Starkey explained in an interview in 2018, "The Roman Church was a super-national organisation with its own system of law, its own language, governance and own system of taxation. In other words, exactly like the European Union! And it's no accident at all that the EU was founded by the Treaty of Rome." He explains that Henry VIII fought on the grounds of England ruling itself, which is analogous to the Brexit debates.

He believes that Brexit was a reaffirmation of those values, but was nevertheless a "deeply irrational vote, not about what will make us better off, but rather, 'we'll be poorer, but we'll be free'".

=== Religion ===
Starkey is an atheist. He has described the Catholic Church as being "riddled with corruption". However, he has often defended the right for Christians to hold their beliefs, arguing that they should have the right to their views and penalising them for it is "intolerant, oppressive and tyrannical".

=== Magna Carta ===
Starkey believes the royal charter of rights Magna Carta is of great importance. He has often spoken about it and has written about it most notably in his book Magna Carta: The True Story Behind the Charter (2015). He also presented a television documentary on the subject David Starkey's Magna Carta, in which he argued that Magna Carta is a steadying force for constitutions. He believes that Magna Carta is essential in keeping peace and constraints on the state and the public and says that it is this rather shaky but very important 800 year old document that has led to a "constitutional edifice" developing in the UK.

Starkey often speaks about the political implications of Magna Carta in present-day politics. He believes the modern UK state appears to be fragmenting and would be helped by the core principles of the charter with a new charter of liberties or a new William Marshal figure. In a review of Starkey's book on Magna Carta, medieval historian James Masschaele said that Starkey viewed the barons as republican figures.

=== England riots and black culture ===
Starkey attracted criticism in August 2011 for comments he made on BBC Two's Newsnight programme, in an episode discussing the 2011 England riots where he was a panel member alongside Owen Jones and Dreda Say Mitchell. Citing Enoch Powell's "Rivers of Blood" speech, he said:

His prophesy was absolutely right in one sense. The Tiber did not foam with blood but flames lambent, they wrapped around Tottenham and wrapped around Clapham. But it wasn't inter-community violence. This is where he was absolutely wrong.

What has happened is that the substantial section of the chavs that you wrote about [Jones, in his then-recent book Chavs: The Demonization of the Working Class] have become black. The whites have become black. A particular sort of violent, destructive, nihilistic, gangster culture has become the fashion.

And black and white, boy and girl, operate in this language together, this language which is wholly false, which is this Jamaican patois that's been intruded in England, and this is why so many of us have this sense of literally a foreign country.

He also said that when listening to the voice of David Lammy, whom he described as "an archetypal successful black man", one "would think he was white". In response, Mitchell criticised Starkey for focusing on "black culture", saying: "black communities are not homogenous. So there are black cultures. Lots of different black cultures."

Following the programme, both of Starkey's fellow panellists condemned the remarks: Jones described it as a "career-ending moment" for Starkey, while Mitchell wrote in The Guardian that "it is [...] very difficult to argue with crass stupidity", calling his views on the matter "ignorant and confused". The then-leader of the Labour Party, Ed Miliband, said that the remarks were "racist comments, frankly, and there is no place for them in our society". David Lammy called them "irrelevant".

Rod Liddle argued in support of the remarks in his column in The Spectator. Writing for The Telegraph, author Toby Young defended Starkey, saying that he had not been talking about black culture in general. Also in The Telegraph, Starkey argued his views had been distorted, he referred only to a "particular sort" of "black culture", and that the educationalists Tony Sewell and Katharine Birbalsingh supported the substance of his Newsnight comments.

The programme was broadcast on Friday night; by the following Monday, the BBC had received 696 complaints, and the broadcasting regulator Ofcom a further 103, about the comments, and a petition demanding a public apology from the BBC had attracted over 3,600 signatures. Ofcom deemed the comments to have been part of a "serious and measured discussion" and took no action, and Starkey described the reaction as "hysteria about race".

In the aftermath of the Newsnight broadcast, 102 university historians signed an open letter, published in the Times Higher Education magazine, asking broadcasters to "think carefully" before inviting Starkey to discuss topics beyond his field of expertise. They asked that, if he was invited, to not allow him to "bring our profession into disrepute" by introducing him as "the historian, David Starkey", as the BBC had done previously. The letter said that "his crass generalisations about black culture and white culture as oppositional, monolithic entities demonstrate a failure to grasp the subtleties of race and class that would disgrace a first-year history undergraduate" and that he "displayed some of the worst practices of an academic" in his interactions with the other panellists, saying that he "belittled and derided them" instead of responding thoughtfully.

In 2012, Jones wrote in The Independent that the controversy had been "one of the ugliest episodes of the backlash" against the riots.

=== Other comments on race and British culture ===
In a June 2012 debate Starkey was criticised for stating that the perpetrators of the Rochdale child sex abuse ring had values "entrenched in the foothills of the Punjab or wherever it is" and were "acting within their cultural norm". He was accused by his fellow panelist writer Laurie Penny of "playing xenophobia and national prejudice for laughs". In 2013, he criticised the inclusion of the British-Jamaican nurse Mary Seacole in British school history curriculums, which he argued unduly promoted her and her work.

In a January 2015 appearance on Question Time, Starkey called political journalist Mehdi Hasan "Ahmed" and said that "nothing important" had been written in Arabic for 500 years. He also appeared to imply that a female victim of a child sexual abuse grooming gang was at fault for the abuse she had experienced. He received a large amount of criticism on Twitter for these comments.

In November 2015, the University of Cambridge dropped a fundraising video featuring Starkey after a backlash from staff and students. A letter signed by hundreds of students and staff criticised Starkey's involvement in the video due to him "repeatedly making racist statements".

In May 2023, speaking to GB News, Starkey expressed his belief that prime minister Rishi Sunak was "not fully grounded in" British culture. When the host, Andrew Pierce, asked him to clarify Starkey confirmed that he attributed this to Sunak's Hindu religion. Starkey later denied his comments were racist, saying he was referring to the prime minister being a "typical international liberal" with no interest in British "values".

=== Black Lives Matter and slavery ===
==== 2020 comments ====
On 30 June 2020, in a podcast interview with Darren Grimes, Starkey spoke about the Black Lives Matter movement. Starkey suggested that people should not "go on about" slavery because it had been abolished in 1833 and that "slavery was not genocide, otherwise there wouldn't be so many damn blacks in Africa or in Britain would there? An awful lot of them survived". He had made the same point in a column eight days earlier except without the use of the word "damn". Starkey's comments were rebuffed by former Chancellor Sajid Javid, who said they were racist and that they serve as "a reminder of the appalling views that still exist", and they were widely described as racist in the media. Historian David Olusoga, praised by Starkey in the same broadcast, described the comments as "truly disgusting".

As a result, the Mary Rose Trust accepted his resignation from the board of trustees and the Historical Association withdrew the Medlicott Medal it had awarded him 20 years previously. Fitzwilliam College of Cambridge University distanced themselves from his comments and later accepted his resignation as an honorary fellow on 3 July 2020. Canterbury Christ Church University, where Starkey had been a visiting professor, removed him from that role in response to his "completely unacceptable" remarks. The magazine History Today also removed him from their editorial board. Lancaster University revoked Starkey's honorary degree after an investigation found that his comments were "racist and contradictory to the values of the University". The University of Kent launched a formal review of his honorary graduate status. HarperCollins terminated its book deal with Starkey and his previous publisher, Hodder & Stoughton, has also said that they "will not be publishing any further books by him". Vintage Books announced it would be reviewing the status of books by Starkey in their back catalogue. Also on 3 July 2020, at a meeting of the Royal Historical Society, the society's council resolved that Starkey should be asked to resign his fellowship with immediate effect. On 6 July 2020, Starkey resigned his fellowship of the Society of Antiquaries of London at the request of its council.

On 25 September 2020, the Metropolitan Police opened an investigation into the interview over an allegation of a public order offence, which Starkey has stated was strongly supported by Labour leader Keir Starmer. In October, Starkey was investigated by the police for "stirring up racial hatred" through the comments he made in the podcast with Darren Grimes. In regard to the allegations, Starkey said that he did not "intend to stir up racial hatred and there was nothing about the circumstances of the broadcast which made it likely to do so" and also that the investigation by the police was "neither proportionate nor in the best interests of preserving proper freedom of expression".

On 14 October the police dropped their investigation saying that "it is no longer proportionate that this investigation continues". A backlash in favor of free speech followed, from several major UK politicians such as then home secretary Priti Patel who said the law should protect freedom of speech as a "general principle" which should not be violated. Following the news of the ending of the investigation, Starkey said: "The investigation should never of course have begun. From the beginning it was misconceived, oppressive and designed to misuse the criminal law to curtail the proper freedom of expression and debate ... freedom is our birthright; and it is more important than ever at this critical juncture in our nation's history."

Grimes and Starkey subsequently launched a formal complaint against the Metropolitan Police accusing them of being biased against them and acting in "deference" to the Black Lives Matter movement.

==== 2023 comments ====
In May 2023 at the National Conservatism Conference, organised by the Edmund Burke Foundation, Starkey said that "white culture" is under threat from the Black Lives Matter movement and proponents of critical race theory who are "not what they pretend to be" and who he described are attempting to destroy "the entire legitimacy of the Western cultural tradition". He stated that said conservatives had to defend the "uniqueness of the Anglo-American tradition" against "barbarians".

He disputed the "idea that they are there to defend black lives" as "preposterous", saying that "they only care about the symbolic destruction of white culture" that they see as "fundamentally morally defective", comparing it to "exactly what was done to German culture because of Nazism and the Holocaust".

Starkey commented that "the determination is to replace the Holocaust with slavery" and "this is why Jews are under such attack from the left", because "there is jealousy of the moral primacy of the Holocaust and a determination to replace it with slavery".

== Personal life ==
Starkey lived for many years with his partner, James Brown, a publisher and book designer, until the latter's death in 2015. The couple had three homes: a house in Highbury, a manor house in Kent, and another in Chestertown, Maryland, US. Starkey previously lived at John Spencer Square in Canonbury, Islington.

== Honours ==
Starkey was appointed Commander of the Order of the British Empire (CBE) in the 2007 Birthday Honours for services to history.

=== Commonwealth honours ===
Commonwealth honours
| Country | Date | Appointment | Post-nominal letters |
|---|---|---|---|
| United Kingdom | 2007 | Commander of the Order of the British Empire | CBE |

=== Scholastic ===
University degrees
| Location | Date | School | Degree |
|---|---|---|---|
| England | | Fitzwilliam College, Cambridge | First-class honours Bachelor of Arts (BA) in History |
| England | | Fitzwilliam College, Cambridge | Doctor of Philosophy (PhD) in History |

Chancellorships, visitorships, governorships, rectorships and fellowships
| Location | Date | School | Position |
|---|---|---|---|
| England | until 2015 | University of Kent | Honorary Visiting Professor of History |
| England | 2006 – 3 July 2020 | Fitzwilliam College, Cambridge | Honorary Fellow |
| England | until 3 July 2020 | Canterbury Christ Church University | Visiting Professor of History |

Honorary degrees
| Location | Date | School | Degree | Status |
|---|---|---|---|---|
| England | 21 July 2004 | Lancaster University | Doctor of Letters (D.Litt.) | Revoked on 24 July 2020 |
| England | 11 July 2006 | University of Kent | Doctor of Letters (D.Litt.) | Revoked in 2020 |
| England | March 2019 | University of Buckingham | Doctor of Letters (D.Litt.) | Revoked on 3 July 2020 |

=== Memberships and fellowships ===
Learned societies
| Location | Date | Organisation | Position |
|---|---|---|---|
| United Kingdom | 1984 – 13 July 2020 | Royal Historical Society | Fellow (FRHistS) |
| United Kingdom | 1994 – 6 July 2020 | Society of Antiquaries of London | Fellow (FSA) |
| United Kingdom | 1996 – 2005 | The Society for Court Studies | President |
| United Kingdom | 2024 – present | The Peel Club | Vice-president |

Museums and trusts
| Location | Date | Organisation | Position |
|---|---|---|---|
| United Kingdom | 2008 – 3 July 2020 | Mary Rose Museum | Trustee and Hon. Commodore |
| United Kingdom | 2005 – 2020' | National Maritime Museum | Hon. Commodore |

Museums and trusts
| Location | Date | Organisation | Position |
|---|---|---|---|
| United Kingdom | 2008 – 3 July 2020 | Mary Rose Museum | Trustee and Hon. Commodore |
| United Kingdom | 2005 – 2020' | National Maritime Museum | Hon. Commodore |

== Awards ==
| Location | Date | Institution | Award |
|---|---|---|---|
| United Kingdom | 2001; withdrawn on 3 July 2020 | The Historical Association | The Medlicott Medal |

== Work ==
=== Books ===
- Souden, David; Starkey, David (1985). This Land of England. Muller Blond and White for Channel 4. ISBN 978-0584111286.
- Starkey, David (1986). The Reign of Henry VIII: Personalities and Politics. New York: Franklin Watts. ISBN 9780531150146.
- Coleman, Christopher; Starkey, David, eds. (1986). Revolution Reassessed: Revisions in the History of Tudor Government and Administration. Oxford: Oxford University Press. ISBN 978-0198730644.
- Starkey, David, ed. (1987). The English Court from the Wars of the Roses to the Civil War. Harlow: Longman. ISBN 978-0582013599.
- Starkey, David (1990). Rivals in Power: the Lives and Letters of the Great Tudor Dynasties. London: Macmillan. ISBN 9780333514528.
- Starkey, David, ed. (1991). Henry VIII: A European Court in England. London: Abbeville Press. ISBN 978-1558592414.
- Ward, Philip; Hawkyard, Alistair; Starkey, David, eds. (1998). The Transcript. The Inventory of Henry VIII. Vol. 1. London: Harvey Miller for The Society of Antiquaries of London. ISBN 1-872501-89-3.
- Ward, Philip; Hawkyard, Alistair; Starkey, David, eds. (1998). Textiles and Dress. The Inventory of Henry VIII. Vol. 2. London: Harvey Miller for The Society of Antiquaries of London. ISBN 978-1872501949.
- Starkey, David (2000). Elizabeth: Apprenticeship. London: Chatto and Windus. ISBN 9780701169398. (published in North America as Elizabeth: The struggle for the throne)
- Cruickshanks, Eveline, ed. (2000). The Stuart Courts. Foreword by David Starkey. Cheltenham: The History Press. ISBN 9780752452067.
- Ward, Philip; Hawkyard, Alistair; Starkey, David, eds. (2002). Essays and Illustrations. The Inventory of Henry VIII. Vol. 3. London: Harvey Miller for The Society of Antiquaries of London. ISBN 978-1872501994.
- Starkey, David (2003). Six Wives: The Queens of Henry VIII. London: Chatto and Windus. ISBN 0701172983.
- Doran, Susan, ed. (2003). Elizabeth I: The Exhibition Catalogue. Curated by David Starkey. London: Chatto and Windus. ISBN 978-0701174767.
- Carley, James P (2004). The Books of King Henry VIII and His Wives. Introduction and Preface by David Starkey. London: The British Library. ISBN 978-0712347914.
- Starkey, David (2004). The Beginnings. The Monarchy of England. Vol. 1. London: Chatto and Windus. ISBN 978-0701176785.
- Starkey, David (2006). Monarchy: From the Middle Ages to Modernity. London: Harper Press. ISBN 978-0007247509.
- McCarthy, Sarah; Nurse, Bernard; Gaimster, David, eds. (2007). Making History: Antiquaries in Britain, 1707–2007. Introduction by David Starkey. London: Royal Academy of Arts. ISBN 978-1905711048.
- Starkey, David (2008). Henry: Virtuous Prince. London: Harper Press. ISBN 9780007247714.
- Doran, Susan, ed. (2009). Henry VIII; Man & Monarch. Introduction by David Starkey. London: The British Library. ISBN 978-0-7123-5025-9.
- Starky, David (2010). Crown and Country: A History of England through the Monarchy. London: Harper Press. ISBN 9780007307708. (A compilation of The Monarchy of England: The Beginnings, Monarchy: From the Middle Ages to Modernity and some new material)
- Goodwin, George (2011). Fatal Colours: Towton 1461 – England's Most Brutal Battle. Introduction by David Starkey. London: W & N. ISBN 9780297860716.
- Starkey, David; Greening, Katie (2013). Music and Monarchy: A History of Britain in Four Movements. London: BBC Books. ISBN 978-1849905862.
- Starkey, David (2015). Magna Carta: The True Story Behind the Charter. London: Hodder and Stoughton. ISBN 978-1473610057.
- Starkey, David (2020). Henry: Model of a Tyrant. London: Harper Collins. ISBN 9780007288700.

=== Television ===
- Henry VIII (1998, revised 2001)
- Elizabeth (2000)
- The Six Wives of Henry VIII (2001)
- Edward and Mary: The Unknown Tudors (2002)
- David Starkey: Reinventing the Royals (2002)
- Monarchy by David Starkey (2004–2007)
- Henry VIII: The Mind of a Tyrant (2009)
- Kate and William: Romance and the Royals (2011)
- Jamie's Dream School (2011)
- The Churchills (2012)
- David Starkey's Music and Monarchy (2013)
- Britain's Tudor Treasure: A Night at Hampton Court, co-presented with Lucy Worsley (2015)
- David Starkey's Magna Carta (2015)
- Reformation: Europe's Holy War (2017)

=== Applications ===
- Kings and Queens by David Starkey for iPhone and iPad (2011)
