= Constantinople: City of the World's Desire, 1453–1924 =

1995 book by Philip Mansel

- Author: Philip Mansel
- Subject: Constantinople
- Genre: Non-fiction
- Publication date: 1995

Constantinople: City of the World's Desire 1453-1924 is a 1995 non-fiction book by Philip Mansel, covering Constantinople (now Istanbul) during the rule of the Ottoman Empire.

The author hoped to show positive aspects of the Ottoman Empire while acknowledging some negative aspects.

William Dalrymple of The Independent stated that it is an important work due to few people being able to comprehend Ottoman Turkish and therefore being able to research the Ottoman Empire.

== Background ==
William Armstrong of Hürriyet Daily News stated that the usage of "Constantinople" instead of "Istanbul" was a "deliberate decision" to highlight the "historical cosmopolitanism" that ended after the end of the empire.

== Contents ==
Mordecai Lee of the University of Wisconsin-Milwaukee states that the book "maintains a strict academic-level presentation" although it is "eminently readable for a lay person". The author discusses the various aspects of the city, among them religious tolerance and tensions. Armstrong states that the book does not flesh out "historical background" and therefore does not demonstrate "deep impression of the underlying intellectual undercurrents".

The book's bibliography and end notes sections make up 22 and 41 pages each.

== Reception ==
John Ash of The Washington Post stated that Mansel wrote an "engaging and richly detailed account".

Lee stated that the "more positive aspects of Ottoman history[...]are especially enlightening to the reader". Lee praised how the "information flows naturally" and concluded that it was an "outstanding book".

Dalrymple described it as "an impeccably researched masterpiece of exquisite historical writing, without question one of the finest books ever written by an Englishman on the Turks."
