= The London Encyclopaedia =

Historical reference book

- Third edition, 2008
- Editor: Ben Weinreb; Christopher Hibbert; Julia Keay; John Keay
- Language: English
- Genre: Reference
- Publisher: Macmillan
- Publication date: 1983
- Publication place: United Kingdom

The London Encyclopaedia, first published in 1983, is a 1,100-page historical reference work on London, the capital city of the United Kingdom, covering the whole of the Greater London area.

== Development ==
The first edition of the encyclopaedia was compiled over a number of years by the antiquarian bookseller Ben Weinreb (1912–1999) and the historian Christopher Hibbert (1924–2008). Revised editions were published in 1993 and 2008 (with reprints in other years for book club and paperback editions). It has around 5,000 articles, supported by two indices, one general and one listing people, each with about 10,000 entries, and is published by Macmillan.

In 2012, an app was developed by Heuristic-Media and released as London—A City Through Time. Toby Evetts and Simon Reeves, partners in Heuristic-Media, discussed the development of the app with The Guardian in 2013, describing how 4,500 entries had to be plotted onto a guide map by hand.

== Antecedents ==
The encyclopaedia builds on a number of earlier publications, including:

- Survey of London by John Stow, 1598.
- The Survey of London — a multi-volume publication originated in 1894 by Charles Robert Ashbee, adopted first by the London County Council, then the Greater London Council, and now domiciled with English Heritage.
- Handbook for London by Peter Cunningham, 1849.
- London Past and Present by Henry B. Wheatley and Peter Cunningham, 1891.

== See also ==
- The Encyclopaedia of Oxford – also edited by Christopher Hibbert
- A London Encyclopaedia – a general encyclopaedia begun by Thomas Tegg and published in London in 1829
