= Thomas Robert Way =

English painter

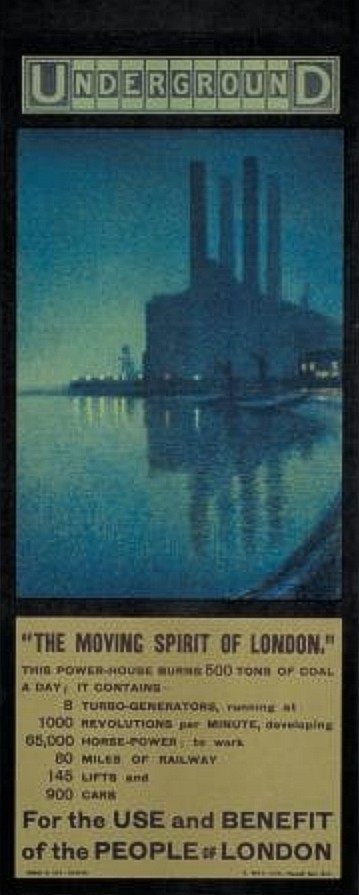
Underground; the moving spirit of London (1910)

Thomas Robert Way (1861 - 1913) was an English painter of landscapes and portraits, lithographer and printer, who exhibited in London between 1883 and 1893.

Way was born in London. He trained at the South Kensington Art Schools and designed posters for London Underground between 1910 and 1913. T. R. Way's father, Thomas Way (1837–1915), was a lithographer, engraver and general printer who founded the firm Thomas Way and Son.

T. R. Way is noted for his topographical lithographs of London. His catalogue of 130 of James McNeill Whistler's lithographs appeared in 1896. At his (and his father's) urging Whistler took up lithography, and Way eventually published "Mr. Whistler's Lithographs" in 1905. Later, in 1912, he wrote a memoir as Whistler's friend and confidant, "Memories of James McNeill Whistler". He also printed the work of Frank Brangwyn. He died in 1913 and is buried in an unmarked grave on the eastern side of Highgate Cemetery.

== Books of his lithographs ==
- Mr. Whistler's Lithographs (1896); 2nd edition (1905)
- Reliques of Old London (1896)
- Later Reliques of Old London (1897)
- Reliques of Old London Suburbs North of the Thames (1898)
- Architectural Remains of Richmond, Twickenham, Kew, Petersham and Mortlake (1900)
- Ancient Royal Palaces in and Near London (1902) - 24 full-page lithographs
- Reliques of Stratford-on-Avon (1902)
- The Ancient Halls of the City Guilds (1903)
- The Art of James McNeill Whistler (1903)
- Memories of James McNeill Whistler (1912)
- Catalogue of an Exhibition of Lithographs by Whistler (1914)
