= Benjamin Robert Wheatley =

- Born: 29 September 1819; London, England
- Died: 9 January 1884 (aged 64); London, England
- Occupation: bibliographer

Benjamin Robert Wheatley (29 September 1819 – 9 January 1884) was an English bibliographer.

== Life ==
Wheatley was born on 29 September 1819, the eldest son of Benjamin Wheatley, an auctioneer in Piccadilly. He was educated at King's College School, London, and on leaving, took up the compilation of catalogues and indexes.

== Cataloguer ==
In 1843 Wheatley catalogued a portion of the library of the Athenæum Club, under the supervision of C. J. Stewart, the bookseller. In 1844 he catalogued the library of Charles Shaw-Lefevre at Heckfield in Hampshire, and in 1845 the remains of the library at Hafod Uchtryd collected by Thomas Johnes In the same year he catalogued the library of the Geological Society, and in 1846 that of Charles Richard Fox in Addison Road, Kensington, and that collected by John Byrom at Kersal Cell, Manchester (catalogue printed in 1848). Between 1847 and 1850 he catalogued the libraries of John Archer Houblon at Hallingbury Place in Essex, of the Alfred Club, of the Marquess of Lansdowne (at Bowood in Wiltshire, and in Lansdowne House, Berkeley Square), of the Royal College of Physicians, of Augustus Gostling at Whitton, of Lord Bolton at Hackwood Park, and of the Army and Navy Club.

In 1850 and 1851 Wheatley was engaged in compiling an index of subjects to supplement the catalogue of authors at the Athenæum Library. It was printed in 1851, and served as a model for subsequent indexes. In 1852 he catalogued the libraries of the Travellers' and the Oxford and Cambridge Club, and in 1853 that of the United Service Club and the Dugald Stewart collection, bequeathed to the club by his son, Colonel Matthew Stewart.

In the subsequent years Wheatly catalogued the libraries of Lady Charlotte Guest at Canford Manor in Dorset, of the Privy Council Office, of Lord Lilford, of Dr. Edward Moore, of the Junior United Service Club, and of the Earl of Romney. He also catalogued, with his friend Thomas Boone, the library of Lord Vernon. In 1854 he made an index to the first 15 volumes of the Statistical Society's Journal (London, 1854), and he continued to make the indexes of the annual volumes to the end of his life.

== Librarian ==
In 1855 Wheatley was appointed resident librarian of the Royal Medical and Chirurgical Society, for whom he had worked in 1841; and from that time he largely ceased to make library catalogues. He was one of the organising committee of the conference of librarians, and served on the first council. He occasionally acted as vice-president of the Library Association.

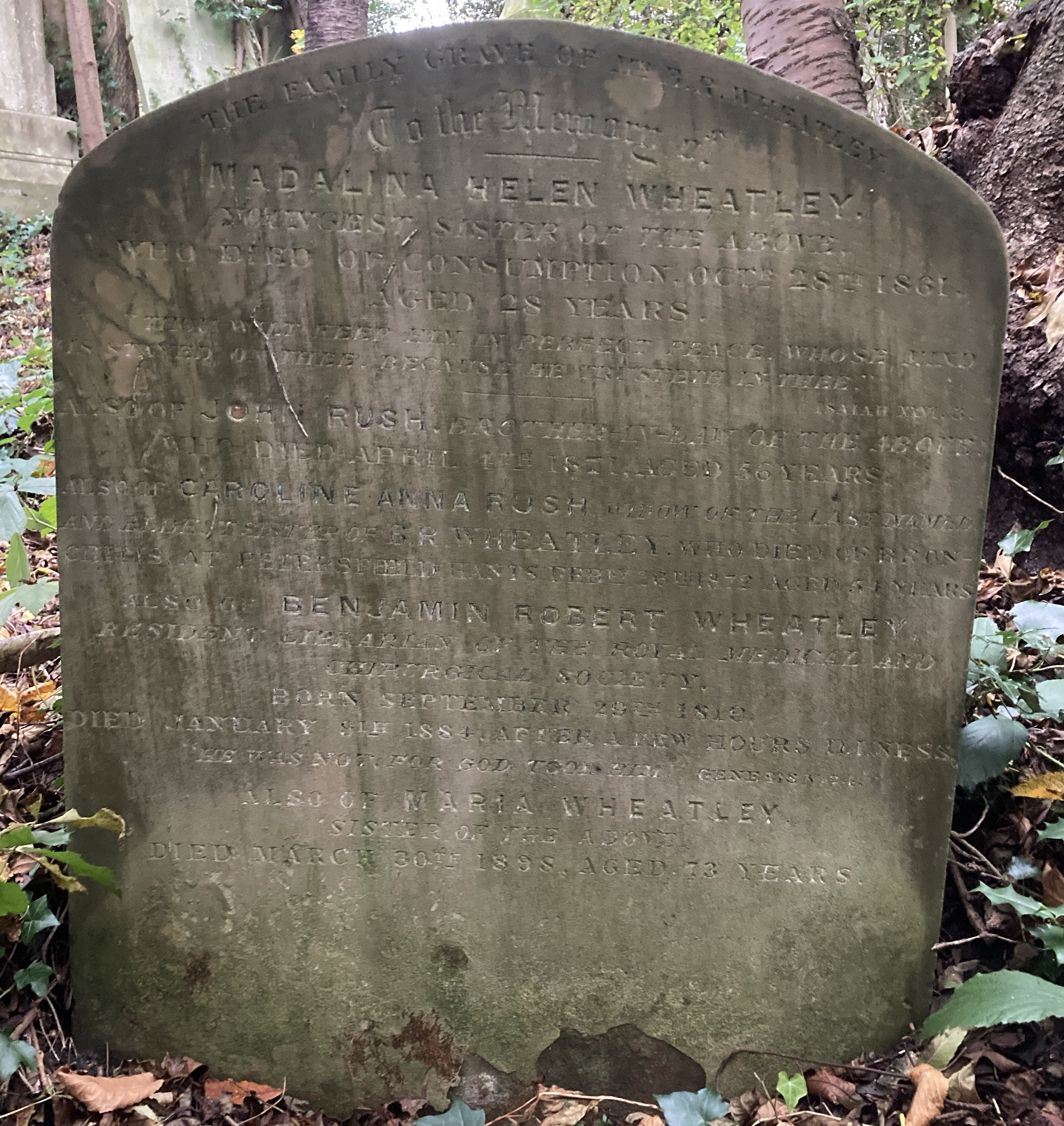
Family grave of Benjamin Robert Wheatley in Highgate Cemetery

Wheatley died in London unmarried on 9 January 1884 at 53 Berners Street, the premises of the Medical and Chirurgical Society. He was buried in a family grave on the western side of Highgate Cemetery.

== Works ==
At 17 years old, Wheatley made a catalogue for his father of the twelfth part of the Heber library, which appeared in 1841. He altered and adapted flexibly the French or "Paris" system of classification; and explained his principles in Desultory Thoughts on the Arrangement of a private Library, which appeared in 1878 in the Library Journal (iii. 211–16).

After 1855, Wheatley prepared some bibliographical notes for the Royal College of Physicians. In 1857 he completed an index to Thomas Tooke's History of Prices. He made two printed catalogues of the Medical and Chirurgical Society's library in 1856 and 1869, and two indexes of subjects in 1860 and 1879; the edition of 1879 was a guide to medical literature. He also made a manuscript catalogue of the collection of engraved portraits of medical men in the possession of the society, with short biographies of 900 of the persons portrayed.

Wheatley's other publications were:

- General Index to the Transactions of the Pathological Society, vols. xvi–xxv., London, 1878.
- General Index to the first twelve volumes of the Transactions of the Clinical Society of London, London, 1880.

He contributed articles on bibliographical subjects to the Transactions and Proceedings of the Conference of Librarians, the Monthly Notes of the Library Association of the United Kingdom, the Bibliographer, and the Library Journal. Wheatley printed poems privately, including Buds of Poesy, London, 1838.

== Notes ==
Attribution

This article incorporates text from a publication now in the public domain: Lee, Sidney, ed. (1899). "Wheatley, Benjamin Robert". Dictionary of National Biography. Vol. 60. London: Smith, Elder & Co.
