= Julia Keay =

British biographer and historian (1946–2011)

Julia Margaret Keay (née Atkins; 16 September 1946 – 2011) was a British biographer, radio scriptwriter, historian and exhibition designer, who also wrote two radio plays and scripted several radio documentaries for the BBC. She collaborated with her husband, John Keay, in editing new editions of the London Encyclopaedia and the Collins Encyclopaedia of Scotland.

Her published biographies included: The Spy Who Never Was: The Life and Loves of Mata Hari (Michael Joseph, 1987), about the Dutch exotic dancer and courtesan Mata Hari who was convicted of being a spy for Germany during World War I and executed by firing squad; With Passport and Parasol: The Adventures of Seven Victorian Ladies (BBC Consumer Publishing, 1990), based on a series scripted by Keay for BBC Radio 4; and Alexander the Corrector: The Tormented Genius Who Unwrote the Bible (Harper Collins, 2004), about the 18th-century Scottish author Alexander Cruden.

Her final book was Farzana: The Woman Who Saved an Empire (I B Tauris, 2014), a biography of Begum Samru who ruled Sardhana, a principality in northerrn India, in the 18th and 19th centuries.

== Personal and family life ==
Her father was the politician Humphrey Atkins. She was married to David John Roderick from 1966 to 1971. With her second husband, John Keay, she had four children, including the historian, broadcaster and curator Anna Keay (born 1974) who is married to the architectural historian Simon Thurley.
