= London Past and Present =

1891 reference work by Henry B. Wheatley

London Past and Present: Its History, Associations, and Traditions by Henry B. Wheatley is a topographical and historical dictionary of London streets and landmarks, published by John Murray in 1891, that is still regarded as a definitive work in its area. Wheatley's work was based upon The Handbook of London by Peter Cunningham, published 1849, as well as literary, architectural and historical sources.

It was reprinted by Cambridge University Press in 2011 in the Cambridge Library Collection of "works of enduring scholarly value".

== Volumes ==
- Vol. I. Preface, Introduction, and Abbey Road to Dyot Street.
- Vol. II. Eagle Tavern to Ozinda's Coffee-house.
- Vol. III. Paddington to Zoological Gardens, and Index.

== See also ==
- The London Encyclopaedia
