= Ben Weinreb =

British bookseller and expert on the history of London

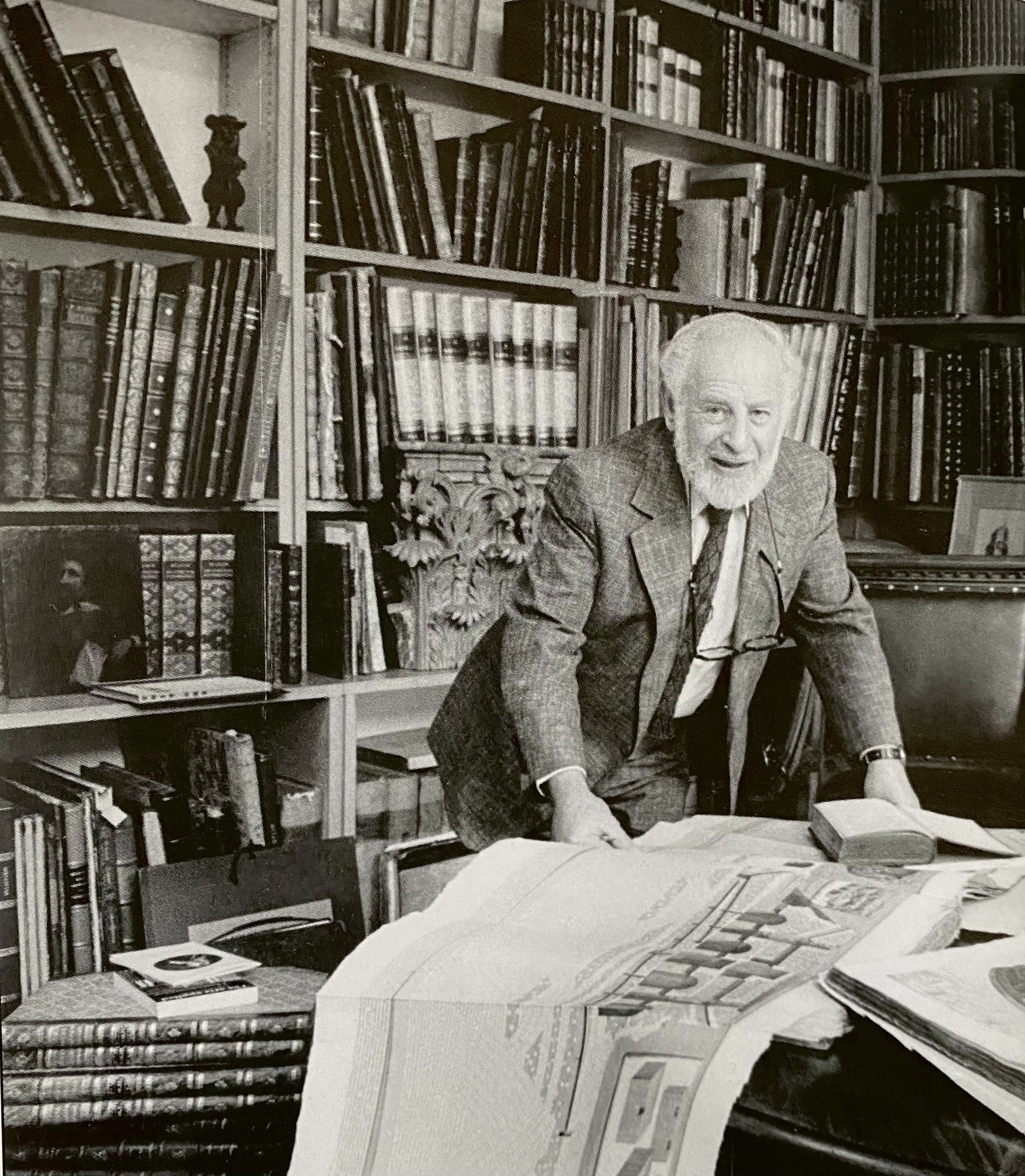
- Ben Weinreb in his best book room, Great Russell Street, London in the 1980s
- Born: 1912; Halifax, West Riding of Yorkshire, England
- Died: 1999
- Education: Whitgift School
- Occupation: Bookseller
- Spouses: Kay Lazarus; Joan Glover

Benjamin Weinreb (1912–1999) was a British bookseller and expert on the history of London who in 1968 sold his entire stock to the University of Texas. He developed a specialism in books about architecture about which his catalogues became important references in themselves.

== Early life ==
Weinreb was born in Halifax, West Riding of Yorkshire. He attended the Whitgift School in Croydon but left at age 18 without any qualifications. He was dealing in books from a young age and soon after he left school, he bought an inscribed book by Max Beerbohm for sixpence, (half of a shilling), from a barrow in Charing Cross Road and sold it on to a dealer for five shillings, ten times as much. He was taken on by Foyle's bookshop to fill shelves but was sacked for lateness. He tried his hand at writing about theatre with part-time bookselling but did not start his first proper book dealing business, "Dipsas", until 1945.

== Bookseller ==
Weinreb had offices in New Oxford Street, then Bloomsbury Mansions (opposite the British Museum) followed by 39 Great Russell Street. His catalogues set new standards for detail and prices and he worked with specialists in other fields, for maps and religious books, when he needed to. He was always prepared to buy large lots whether he had the cash flow to justify the purchase or not and his readiness to do deals sometimes frustrated his partners.

== Writing ==
Weinreb was the compiler of the first edition of The London Encyclopaedia, published in 1983.

== Family ==
Weinreb was married to the textile designer Kay Lazarus, and later Joan Kingdom Row who predeceased him. He had three children: Lindy with Kay, and Matthew and Deborah with Joan.
