= Simon Thurley =

English academic and architectural historian

Simon Thurley CBE FSA FRIBA FRHistS

Chief Executive Officer of English Heritage
- In office 2002–2015
- Succeeded by: Kate Mavor

Personal details
- Born: Simon John Thurley; 29 August 1962 (age 64) Huntingdon, Cambridgeshire, England
- Citizenship: United Kingdom
- Spouses: Katharine Goodison (div. 2007) Anna Keay (m. 2008)
- Children: 2
- Education: Kimbolton School
- Alma mater: Bedford College, University of London; Courtauld Institute of Art; University of Bath (Honoris causa)

Simon John Thurley (born 29 August 1962) is an English academic and architectural historian. He was chief executive of English Heritage from April 2002 to May 2015. In April 2021, he became chair of the National Lottery Heritage Fund.

== Early life and education ==
Thurley was born in Huntingdon and grew up in Godmanchester. He feels that it was inevitable he became a historian since "by age seven I was helping out at Roman digs near my home ... and childhood holidays invariably involved ticking off stately homes and cathedrals". He attended the private Kimbolton School in Cambridgeshire (1972–82), before leaving to study for a BA degree in history at Bedford College (1982–85).

He passed with a 2:1, and continued his studies at the Courtauld Institute of Art (1985–89). There he gained a distinction for an MA degree in art history, and obtained a PhD degree with the thesis entitled "English Royal Palaces 1450–1550". In 2010, he was awarded an Honorary LLD degree by the University of Bath.

== Career ==
Whilst working on his doctoral research, he took up a post as Inspector of Ancient Monuments for English Heritage (1988–90), later becoming curator of Historic Royal Palaces (1989–97) and director of the Museum of London (1997 to March 2002). He is also a prolific history broadcaster, presenting a history slot on BBC London for three years and – in television – presenting Flying Through Time, Channel Four's 2004 six-part series Lost Buildings of Britain (Channel 4), The Buildings that Shaped Britain (Channel 5) and a six-part history of London (Granada). He also appeared as an expert in a number of episodes of the long-running Channel 4 archaeological programme Time Team.

In 2002, at the age of 39, Thurley was appointed Chief Executive of English Heritage; his relative youth at taking this post led him to be dubbed a "boy wonder". Thurley was the highest-paid member of English Heritage's staff: his emoluments in 2009 totalled £163,000, comprising a basic salary of £136,000 and a performance-related award of £27,000, twenty per cent of basic salary.

== Personal life ==
Thurley married Katharine Goodison (born 1963), a lawyer-turned-hat-designer and daughter of Sir Nicholas Goodison (former Stock Exchange chairman). They divorced in 2007. His late father, a veterinarian, was born and raised in British India, and returned to England in the 1950s some years after India's independence in 1947.

Thurley married secondly Anna Keay (born 1974), a fellow historian, in February 2008. She was the Properties Presentation Director for English Heritage from 2002 to 2011, and is now Director of the Landmark Trust. They live in London and a medieval merchant's house in King's Lynn, Norfolk, and have two children.

== Honours ==
He was appointed Commander of the Order of the British Empire (CBE) in the 2011 Birthday Honours for services to conservation.

== Fellowships and other memberships ==
- Visiting Professor of the Built Environment at Gresham College
- Honorary Fellow and Visiting Professor of London Medieval History at Royal Holloway, University of London
- Fellow of the Society of Antiquaries of London
- Fellow of the Royal Historical Society (F.R.Hist.S.)
- Honorary Fellow of the Royal Institute of British Architects (FRIBA)
- Senior Fellow of the Institute of Historical Research
- President of the London and Middlesex Archaeological Society (2005–2008)
- President of the Huntingdonshire History Society
- Chairman of the Society for Court Studies
- Serves on the Council of St Paul's Cathedral
- Trustee for the Canal and River Trust
- Founder of the European Heritage Heads Forum (EHHF)

== Publications ==
- The Royal Palaces of Tudor England: A Social and Architectural History (Yale University Press, 1993) ISBN 9780300054200
- Royal Lodgings at the Tower of London 1216-1327 (SAHGB, 1995)
- Hampton Court Palace: The Official Guidebook (Historic Royal Palaces, 1996)
- The Lost Palace of Whitehall (RIBA, 1998)
- Whitehall Palace Plan of 1670 (London Topographical Society, 1998)
- Whitehall Palace: An Architectural History of the Royal Apartments 1240–1698 (Yale University Press, 1999)
- Hampton Court: A Social and Architectural History (Yale University Press, 2003)
- Lost Buildings of Britain (Viking, 2004) – accompanying the Channel Four TV series
- Whitehall Palace: The Official Illustrated History (Merrell, 2008)
- Somerset House: The Palace of England's Queens 1551–1692 (London Topographical Society, 2009)
- (with Rob Poulton and Alan Cook) Excavations at Oatlands Palace 1968–73 and 1983–4 (2010)
- Men from the Ministry: How Britain Saved its Heritage (Yale University Press, 2013) ISBN 978-0-300-19572-9
- Houses of Power: The Places that Shaped the Tudor World (Bantam Press, 2017) ISBN 0593074947, 978-0593074947
- Palaces of Revolution: Life, Death and Art at the Stuart Court (William Collins, 2021) ISBN 978-0008389963
- St James's Palace From Leper Hospital to Royal Court (Yale University Press, 2022) ISBN 9780300267464

== Notes ==
Cultural offices
| Preceded by Max Hebditch | Director of the Museum of London; 1997–2002 | Succeeded by Jack Lohman |
| Preceded by | Chief Executive of English Heritage; 2002–2015 | Succeeded by Kate Mavor |
