= Cultural depictions of Mary, Queen of Scots =

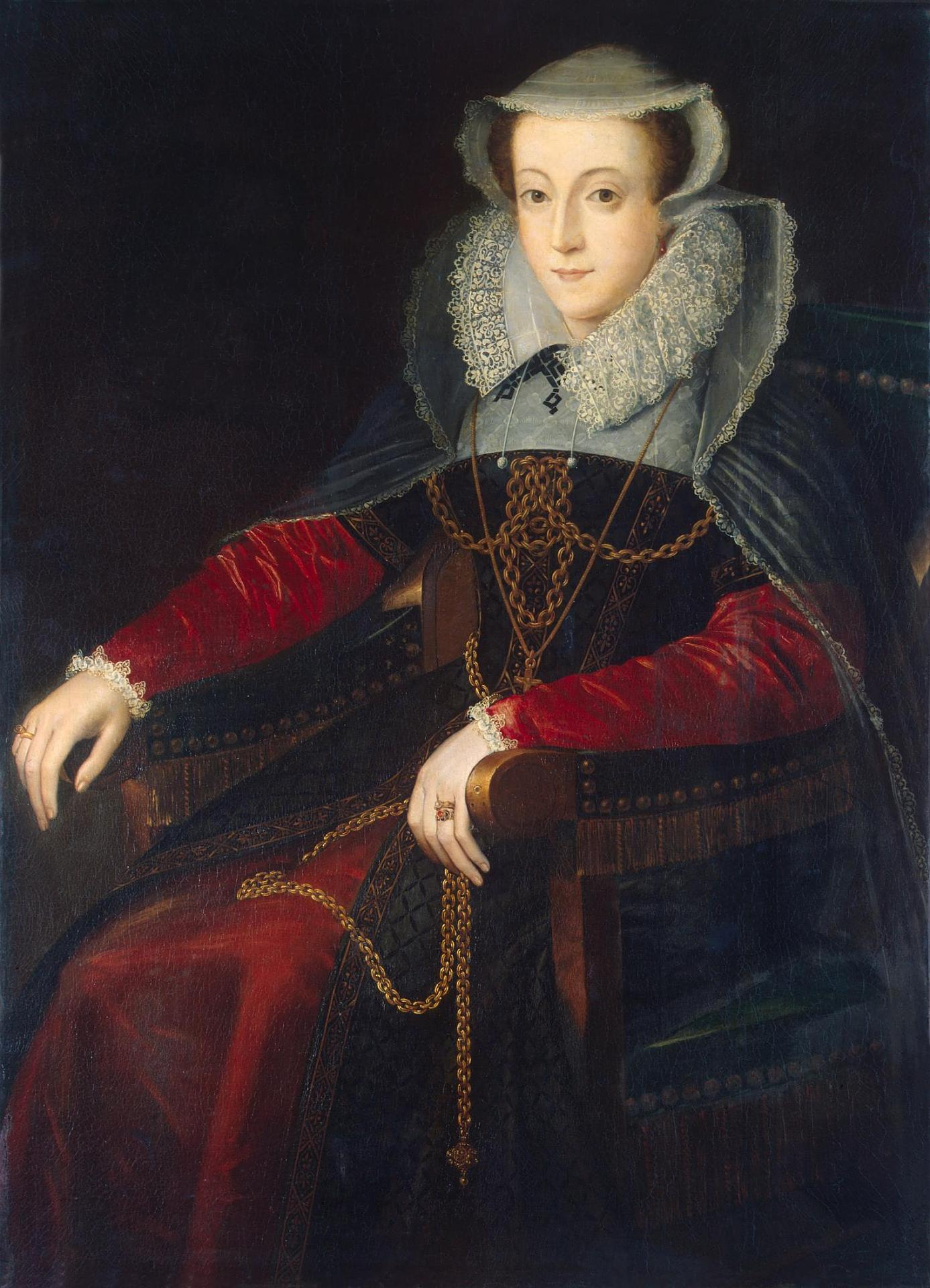
A 19th-century painting of Mary Queen of Scots in the Hermitage, Russia

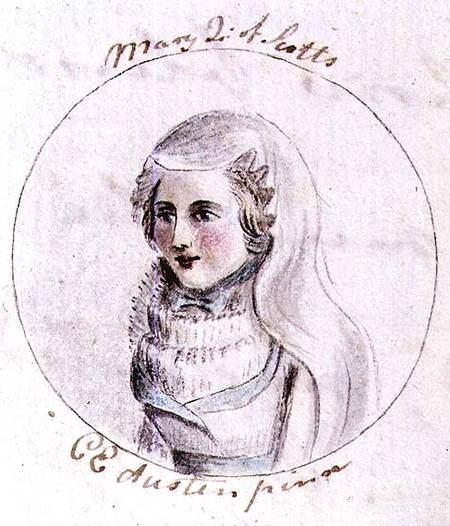
Cassandra Austen's drawing of Mary Queen of Scots in Jane Austen's burlesque juvenile History of England

Mary, Queen of Scots, has inspired artistic and cultural works for more than four centuries. The following lists cover various media, enduring works of high art, and recent representations in popular culture. The entries represent portrayals that a reader has a reasonable chance of encountering rather than a complete catalogue.

== Films ==
An 1895 reproduction of the historic scene, produced by Edison Manufacturing Co.

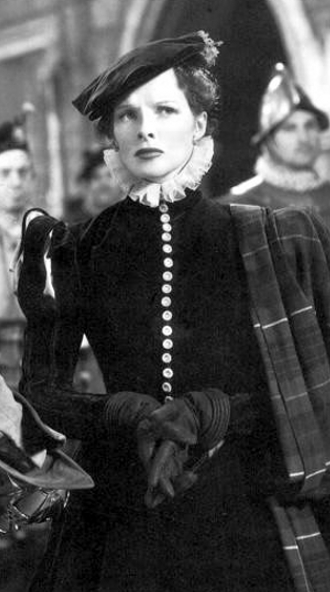
Katharine Hepburn in John Ford's 1936 film adaption of Maxwell Anderson's play Mary of Scotland

The 1936, 1971 and 2018 film dramatizes a fictional meetings between Queens Mary and Elizabeth take place.

- The Execution of Mary Stuart (1895), produced by Thomas Edison, the first appearance of Mary on film, depicts her beheading. It is one of the first films to utilize an intentional jump cut to create the illusion of a single shot beheading.
- The Loves of Mary, Queen of Scots (1923), stars Fay Compton.
- Mary of Scotland (1936) was directed by John Ford, written by Dudley Nichols (based on the stage play Mary of Scotland by Maxwell Anderson, which was a Broadway success in 1933). and stars Katharine Hepburn as Mary, Florence Eldridge as Elizabeth I, and Fredric March as Bothwell.
- Das Herz der Königin (The Heart of a Queen, 1940) features Zarah Leander, the Swedish-German actress from the Nazi period as Mary. This UFA production, directed by Carl Froelich, makes use of the historical story for anti-British propaganda in the context of the then ongoing World War II.
- Mary, Queen of Scots (1971), starring Vanessa Redgrave as Mary, Glenda Jackson as Elizabeth, Patrick McGoohan as Moray, Trevor Howard as Cecil, Ian Holm as Rizzio, Timothy Dalton as Darnley, and Nigel Davenport as Bothwell. was written by John Hale, who also wrote a novelization of the film's screenplay. Two events were included that never historically took place: a private outdoor meeting between Elizabeth and Mary when Mary arrives in England and Elizabeth's visiting Mary in prison the night before Mary's execution.
- The Mirror Crack'd (1980), a Miss Marple mystery, is metafiction (a film within a film centred around the making of a motion picture) about Elizabeth I and Mary Queen of Scots; Elizabeth Taylor portrays the actress playing Mary.
- Elizabeth: The Golden Age (2007) features Samantha Morton as Mary
- Mary Queen of Scots (2013), based on Stefan Zweig's 1935 biography, was directed by Thomas Imbach and stars the bilingual French actress Camille Rutherford.
- Mary Queen of Scots (2018) stars Saoirse Ronan as the titular character and Margot Robbie as Elizabeth.

== Literature ==
=== Fiction and drama ===
This list is in chronological order.

- La Princesse de Clèves (1678), a novel by Madame de La Fayette, features an artistic treatment of Mary, as a young dauphine.
- Friedrich Schiller's novel Wallenstein and Mary Stuart and play Maria Stuart (1800) feature fictional meetings between Queens Mary and Elizabeth, added for dramatic effect.
- The Abbot (1820) by Sir Walter Scott (1820) covers the period of Mary's confinement in Loch Leven castle.
- Mary Stuart (1839-1840) is a novel by Alexandre Dumas, père.
- Magdalen Hepburn (1854), by Margaret Oliphant, is set during the Scottish Reformation, and features both Mary and John Knox as characters.
- Mary Hamilton (1902) by Lord Ernest Hamilton, a novel about a lady-in-waiting to Mary, is based on the traditional ballad, Mary Hamilton.
- The Queen's Quair (1904) is a novel about Mary by Maurice Hewlett.
- A Traveller in Time (1939), by Alison Uttley, is a children's book about a young girl who finds herself in the time of and in the company of Anthony Babington, who is attempting to free Mary and overthrow Elizabeth.
- The Gay Galliard: A Novel of Mary Queen of Scots (1941) is a novel by Margaret Irwin (1941).
- Child Royal (1951) by D. K. Broster is a novel about Mary's childhood.
- The Royal Road to Fotheringay (1955) and The Captive Queen of Scots (1963) is a two-part saga by Jean Plaidy, aka Eleanor Hibbert, featuring Mary as its subject.
- Mary figures importantly in The Lymond Chronicles (1961-1975) by Dorothy Dunnett.
- Immortal Queen (1972) by Elizabeth Byrd
- Flawed Enchantress (1973) (in another edition, So Fair and Foul a Queen (1974)) is a novel by Maureen Peters.
- In The Princeling (1981), volume 3 of The Morland Dynasty historical novels series by Cynthia Harrod-Eagles, the fictional Lettice Morland becomes embroiled in the dramatic events taking place at the court of Mary, Queen of Scots.
- Mary, Queen of Scots (1987) is a young adult novel by Sally Stepanek.
- Mary Queen of Scotland and the Isles (1992) is a novel by Margaret George.
- Shadow Queen (1992) is a supernatural novel by Tony Gibbs, featuring Mary.
- Court of Shadows (1992), by Cynthia Morgan, is a suspense novel.
- The Marchman (1997), Warden of the Queen's March (1989) and The Queen's Grace (1953) are historical novels by Nigel Tranter.
- Fatal Majesty (2000), by Reay Tannahill (2000), is a novel featuring Mary's story.
- Queen's Own Fool: A Novel of Mary Queen of Scots (2001) by Jane Yolen and Robert J. Harris is a children's novel about Mary, Queen of Scots and her jester Nichola.
- Mary, Queen of Scots: Queen Without a Country, France, 1553 (2002), from the Royal Diaries by Kathryn Lasky, is a children's novel about Mary, Queen of Scots.
- The Lady of Fire and Tears (2005) by Terry Deary, is a children's novel about Mary, Queen of Scots.
- Mary is the subject of a short story in The Ladies of Grace Adieu and Other Stories (2006), Susanna Clarke's collection of fantasy tales.
- The Other Queen (2008) is a novel by Philippa Gregory, featuring Mary as its subject.
- Full Story Inside (2008) is a modern thriller by Steve Horsfall. The mystery centres on Information about Mary.
- The Memoirs of Mary, Queen of Scots (2009) is a novel by Carolly Erickson
- The Wild Queen (2012), by Carolyn Meyer, Mary is a young adult historical novel featuring Mary, Queen of Scots as the main character.
- In The Queen’s Consort (2018) by Steven Veerapen, Mary's second husband, Lord Darnley, is the protagonist.

=== Historical biography and analysis ===
This list is in chronological order.

- Maria Stuart (1936) by Stefan Zweig, ISBN 2-253-15079-7
- Mary Queen of Scots (1969) by Antonia Fraser, ISBN 0-385-31129-X
- Mary Queen of Scots: A Study in Failure (London, 1988) by Jenny Wormald, ISBN 0-540-01131-2
- Mary, Queen of Scots, and the Murder of Lord Darnley (New York, 2003) by Alison Weir, ISBN 0-345-43658-X
- The Kings & Queens of Scotland (Stroud, 2004) by Richard Oram, ISBN 0-7524-2971-X
- "Mary Queen of Scots and the French Connection", History Today, 54, 7 (July 2004), pp. 37–43, by Alexander Wilkinson
- Queen of Scots: The True Life of Mary Stuart (New York, 2004) by John Guy, ISBN 0-618-25411-0
- "Mary, Queen of Scots, and the Babington conspiracy", by David Alan Johnson, Military Heritage, August 2005, no. 1, Volume 7, ISSN 1524-8666
- Mary Queen of Scots and French Public Opinion, 1542–1600 (Palgrave, 2005) by Alexander Wilkinson, ISBN 1-4039-2039-7 (hdbk)
- Elizabeth and Mary: Cousins, Rivals, Queens (Vintage, 2005) by Jane Dunn, ISBN 0-375-70820-0.
- Mary Queen of Scots (2006) by Retha Warnicke, ISBN 0-415-29183-6
- Queen of Scots: Truth or Lies (2011) by Rosalind K. Marshall, ISBN 1-873644-95-7
- Embroidering Her Truth: Mary, Queen of Scots and the Language of Power (Sceptre, 2022) by Clare Hunter, ISBN 978-1-52934-628-2
- The Afterlife of Mary, Queen of Scots (Edinburgh University Press, 2024) edited by Steven J. Reid, ISBN 9781399523530
- Captive Queen: The Decrypted History of Mary Queen of Scots (Michael O'Mara, 2024) by Jade Scott, ISBN 978-1-78929-646-4

=== Photography and art books ===
- Singer Tori Amos portrayed Mary Queen of Scots for a photo shoot in late makeup artist Kevyn Aucoin's book Face Forward (ISBN 0-316-28705-9).

=== Poetry ===
- In Nobel laureate Joseph Brodsky's 20 sonnets to Mary Stuart (in Russian) the poet addresses her as an interlocutor.
- The Scottish poet Robert Burns wrote a poem Lament of Mary Queen of Scots, on the Approach of Spring upon Mary's feelings while in her captivity in England, towards her cousin Elizabeth I of England and foreboding of her approaching death.
- The Spanish poet Lope de Vega wrote an epic poem upon Mary Stuart's life and death: Corona trágica (Tragic crown), published in 1628.
- Shortly after Mary Stuart's execution in 1587, the English Jesuit poet Robert Southwell composed an emblem poem portraying Mary as a Catholic martyr. The poem was never published in the early modern period; even owning a manuscript version of the poem was "inevitable flirtation with treason" in Elizabethan England.
- The 1596 edition of Edmund Spenser's Faerie Queene includes an allegorical representation of the trial of Mary Stuart (Book 5, Canto ix, stanzas 36–50). Mary Stuart is represented by Duessa and Elizabeth is figured by Mercilla. The allegory dwells on Elizabeth's reluctance to condemn Mary. Elizabeth's delay of three months before agreeing to have Mary executed is represented by a gap of three stanzas at the end of Canto ix. Mercilla's judgment and Duessa's execution do not actually occur until the beginning of the next Canto (x.1–4).

== Music ==
- John Barry, composer of the soundtrack to the 1971 film, wrote two songs, "Wish Now Was Then" and "This Way Mary" with lyricist Don Black based on themes from the film. They were performed by Matt Monro, with the latter song covered by Scott Walker and Johnny Mathis amongst others.
- The American progressive metal band Dream Theater uses a variation of the mark of Mary, Queen of Scots, as their trademark "Majesty" symbol.
- The song "Fotheringay" by Fairport Convention (with lyrics by Sandy Denny) featured on the 1969 album What We Did on Our Holidays and is an interpretation of the story of Mary's last days in the prison of Fotheringhay Castle. After leaving Fairport Convention, Denny formed a folk rock band named Fotheringay, which released an eponymous debut album Fotheringay in 1970, the cover of which depicted an illustration of the band, including Sandy Denny dressed in Elizabethan costume.
- The song "The Ballad of Mary (Queen of Scots)" by Grave Digger is about her time in prison.
- The song "My Blood Will Live Forever" by Grave Digger is about her time before the execution.
- Data Regina (2017), a multimedia suite by composer Olivia Louvel, featuring violinist Fiona Brice and mastered by Antye Greie, digs deep into the psychic warfare between two 16th-century British queens. Drawn to the life and writings of Mary Queen of Scots, a poet and essayist herself and one of the most read woman of her time, Data Regina is a body of work which gathers electronic songs, "The Antechamber", along with a series of instrumentals, "The Battles", a sonic landscape inspired by the 16th century battles on the Anglo-Scottish border.
- The song "To France" by Mike Oldfield, featured in the 1984 album Discovery, it's based on the story of Mary, not only as a reference in its chorus, but can be perceived in the whole romantized feeling of longing for her old homes, the angst of being imprisoned, the realization of not leaving her prison with life, as the lyrics of the song tolds us.
- The song "Sad Song" by Lou Reed, featured in the 1973 album Berlin, references Mary in its initial verses. The song was also recorded as a demo by Reed's band The Velvet Underground with different lyrics (this version appears on the box set Peel Slowly and See and the "Fully Loaded Edition" of Loaded, but the Velvets' version still references Mary.
- Robert Schumann composed a song cycle "Gedichte der Königin Maria Stuart" (Op. 135) based on five poems from the collection "Rose und Distel" by Gisbert Vincke (1852). This cycle was among the final works that Schumann composed before he went insane.
- Richard Wagner composed a song "Adieux de Marie Stuart" (WWV 61, 1840) based on a poem by Pierre Jean Béranger.

== Opera ==
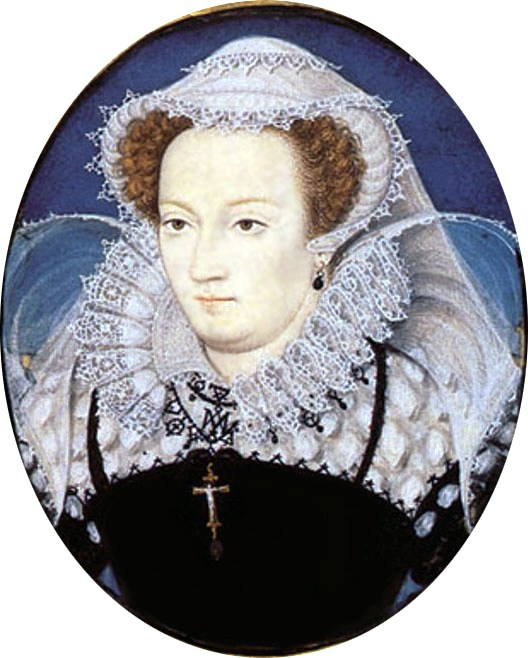
Mary Queen of Scotts (c. 1578), by Nicholas Hilliard, depicts Queen Mary in captivity. She was a regular topic of 19th century European opera.

The subject of Mary, Queen of Scots, was a common one in 19th-century opera. Usually, the operas dealt with the period of her life when she was being persecuted by Elizabeth I of England. Mary was considered a sympathetic character in southern Europe due to her Catholicism.

Mary's story proved popular among liberals and revolutionaries in 19th-century Italy. These were especially attracted by the various plots made to save her as well as her death as a political martyr, both of which they interpreted as comparable to their own struggle. The Carbonari took their name from a mythical ring of English coal-burners, supposedly dedicated to Mary's cause. For this reason, the subject of Mary Stuart came to be seen as a concern of radicals, and operas about her were banned on several occasions.

Nineteenth-century operas about Mary include:

- Luigi Carlini – Maria Stuarda, regina di Scozia (1818)
- Pietro Casella – Maria Stuarda (1812)
- Carlo Coccia – Maria Stuart, regina di Scozia (1827)
- Gaetano Donizetti – Maria Stuarda (1835)
- François-Joseph Fétis – Marie Stuart en Ecosse (1823)
- Saverio Mercadante – Maria Stuarda, regina di Scozia (1825)
- Louis Niedermeyer – Marie Stuart (1844), Paris
- Pasquale Sogner – Maria Stuarda ossia I carbonari di Scozia (1816)

Twentieth-century operas about Mary include:

- Mary Carr Moore - David Rizzio (completed in 1932, on an Italian libretto)
- Thea Musgrave - Mary, Queen of Scots (premiered in 1977 in Edinburgh)
- Bain Murray - ‘’Mary Stuart, A Queen Betrayed’’ (1991) "Bain Murray, Encyclopedia of Cleveland History". 11 May 2018.

== Radio ==
- Joan Crawford played Mary in the 10 March 1937 Lux Radio Theatre adaptation of the film Mary of Scotland, with Franchot Tone as Bothwell and Judith Anderson as Elizabeth.
- Episode 14 of the Australian radio series Famous Escapes is "Mary Queen of Scots Escapes from Prison" (1945); the actress who played Mary is not currently known.
- Another version of the Mary of Scotland play was broadcast on the Theatre Guild on the Air on 28 April 1946, starring Helen Hayes as Mary and Helen Menken as Elizabeth (both of whom had originally played their roles on Broadway).
- On 10 June 1947 the radio series Favorite Story broadcast "Mary Queen of Scots", the "favourite story" of Bing Crosby, with Edna Best as Mary and Benita Hume as Elizabeth.
- The CBS Radio series You Are There broadcast "The Execution of Mary Queen of Scots" on 27 June 1947, 27 June 1948 and 3 April 1949.
- Meg Fraser played Mary twice in BBC Radio 3 productions, first in 2010 in Jo Clifford's adaptation of Madame de La Fayette's novel La Princesse de Cleves and then in 2012 in David Harrower's adaptation of Friedrich Schiller's play Mary Stuart.
- A radio adaptation of Liz Lochhead's play Mary Queen of Scots Got Her Head Chopped Off was broadcast on BBC Radio 3 on 11 February 2001, with Gerda Stevenson as Mary, Siobhan Redmond as Elizabeth I, Bill Paterson as John Knox, and Myra McFadyen as Corbie.
- Jeany Spark played Mary in Episode One, "It Came In with a Lass" (29 June 2013), of the first series of Mike Walker's BBC Radio 4's The Stuarts.
- On 8 December 2018, BBC Radio 4 broadcast as part of their Unmade Movies series Alexander MacKendrick's Mary Queen of Scots, adapted from the original screenplay by Alexander MacKendrick and Jay Presson Allen, with Ellie Bamber as Mary and Glenda Jackson as The Narrator.

== Television ==
- (1957). An episode of the Wonderful World of Disney titled, "The Truth About Mother Goose", discussed the origins of three nursery rhymes. Series host Walt Disney attributed the Mary Mary Quite Contrary rhyme to the life of Mary Stuart. This episode featured a brief animated short about Mary's life, done in the artistic style of Sleeping Beauty. The short touched on important moments in Mary's life, even ending with a scene of Mary being marched to her beheading.
- (1970). Monty Python's Flying Circus episode 22 features a skit involving the first two episodes of "a new radio drama series: The Death of Mary Queen of Scots".
- (1971). The BBC-TV mini-series Elizabeth R, episode 4: "Horrible Conspiracies", written by Hugh Whitemore, is a generally historically accurate portrayal of Mary (played by Vivian Pickles) during her captivity in England, from her imprisonment at Chartley under the guardianship of Sir Amyas Paulet through to her trial and execution, using many of Mary's own reported words as dialogue. It includes an accurate portrayal of her execution including her use of a red petticoat (red being the colour of martyrdom in the Catholic religion), her positioning of her head with her hands on the block, and the two blows and sawing motion it took to remove her head. It also shows the executioner unwittingly grasping and pulling away her wig to reveal her grey hair.
- (1972). The lost BBC1 series Mistress of Hardwick depicts Mary, played by Gilly McIver, along with the titular Bess of Hardwick.
- (1993). An episode of the British series Lovejoy ("The Colour of Mary", series 4) finds the main character seeking information and the whereabouts of Mary's pool table.
- (2002). Lesley Smith, the curator of Tutbury Castle, portrayed Mary Queen of Scots for Living's Most Haunted for a dramatic monologue of her time imprisoned there. Smith continues these re-enactments in the castle.
- (2004). The BBC television miniseries Gunpowder, Treason & Plot dramatizes the reigns of Scottish monarchs Mary, Queen of Scots (played by French actress Clémence Poésy) and her son King James VI of Scotland, who became King James I of England and foiled the Gunpowder Plot.
- (2005). In the Channel 4 television miniseries, Elizabeth I, the first two-hour segment partly centres around the conflict between Elizabeth and Mary (portrayed by Barbara Flynn), whose execution is graphically shown in a manner that is reportedly true to history.
- (2009). In an episode of the CBBC sketch show Horrible Histories, Mary is portrayed by Martha Howe-Douglas and Jessica Ransom.
- (2013). Reign is a highly fictionalized period drama television show on The CW Television Network that follows the life of 15-year-old Mary, Queen of Scots, at French court beginning in 1557, while she awaits her marriage to Francis II of France. At court, Mary has to contend with the changing politics and power plays. Francis' mother, Queen Catherine de' Medici, is secretly trying to prevent the marriage due to the advice of Nostradamus, who had a vision that the wedding will lead to Francis' death. The series also follows the affairs of Mary's four Scottish handmaidens Lola, Kenna, Greer and Aylee (based on the queen's Scottish ladies-in-waiting, the four Maries - Mary Beaton, Mary Fleming, Mary Livingston, and Mary Seton), who are searching for husbands of their own at court. Mary is portrayed by Australian actress Adelaide Kane. The series began airing on 13 October 2013.
- (2015). Mary is portrayed by Grace McCabe in The Last Days of Mary, Queen of Scots, the first episode of 2015 BBC history series The Last Days of...
- (2016). Mary is portrayed by Beth Cooke in the BBC documentary Bloody Queens: Elizabeth and Mary
- (2017). In the Channel 5 television docudrama series Elizabeth I, Mary is portrayed by Audrey L'Ebrellec.
- (2017). Olivia Chenery played Mary in the Spanish and British miniseries Queens: The Virgin and the Martyr.
- (2021). Drag queen Rosé impersonated Mary Queen of Scots for the Snatch Game episode of RuPaul's Drag Race Season 13, where she received high praise for her impersonation and improvisational comedy.
- (2022). Mary is portrayed by Antonia Clarke in the Starz television series The Serpent Queen, which focuses on Catherine de Medici (portrayed by Samantha Morton, who previously portrayed Mary, Queen of Scots, in Elizabeth: The Golden Age), the mother of Mary's first husband Francis II of France.
- In an episode of Japanese series JoJo's Bizarre Adventure, Mary is referenced when two fictional knights were said to have served her and turned themselves in to Elizabeth I in exchange for Mary's life, only to learn moments before their deaths that Mary had already been executed.

== Theatre ==
=== 18th and 19th centuries ===
Mary, Queen of Scots, captured the imagination of Italian radicals and their fellow travellers as a political symbol. The restless interest in this tormented figure resulted in multiple 18th and 19th century plays, such as:

- Maria Stuarda (1778), an historical play by Count Vittorio Alfieri
- Mary, Queen of Scots; An Historical Tragedy, Or, Dramatic Poem (1792) by Mary Deverell
- Mary Stuart by Alexandre Dumas
- Il Trionfo dei Carbonari (1802) by Camillo Federici, the pseudonym of Giovanni Battista Viassolo. It was published in Padua.
- Marie Tudor (1833) by Victor Hugo.
- Maria Stuart (Mary Stuart) (1800) is an influential play by Friedrich Schiller which was the basis for Donizetti's opera and other works. It was most recently produced in London's West End in 2005, starring Janet McTeer and Harriet Walter. Both actresses repeated their performances on Broadway in 2009 and were nominated for a Tony Award; that production was directed by Phyllida Lloyd, who also received a nomination for her work.
- Edoardo Stuart in Scozia by August von Kotzebue.
- Matilde ossia i Carbonari (1809) presented the unhappy queen with a fictitious daughter (who too would figure, later, in Rossini's Elisabetta, regina d'Inghilterra but shorn of any disloyal aspects)
- I carbonari di Dombar [i.e., Dunbar]

=== 20th and 21st centuries ===
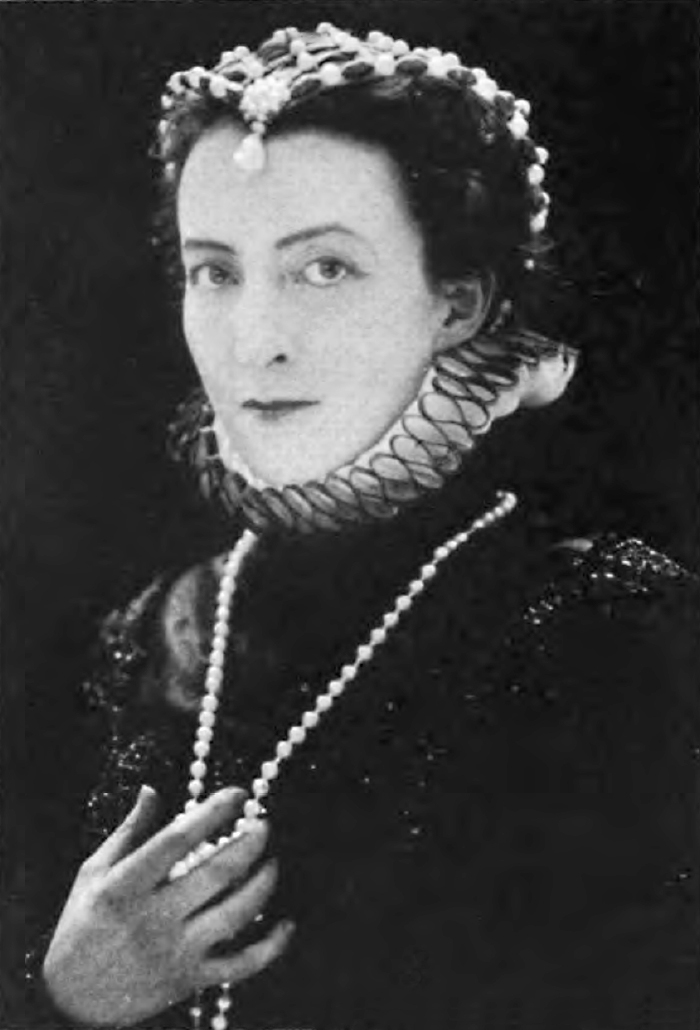
Clare Eames in the Broadway production of John Drinkwater's Mary Stuart (1921)

- Mary of Scotland by Maxwell Anderson was a Broadway success in 1933.
- British playwright John Drinkwater wrote the one-act play Mary Stuart, produced on Broadway in 1921.
- Maxwell Anderson's play Mary of Scotland was produced on Broadway in 1933, starring Helen Hayes.
- Clifford Bax's play Golden Eagle was staged in the West End in 1946 featuring Claire Luce as Mary.
- The Scottish playwright Robert McLellan depicted the events of Mary's downfall, focussing on the months between March 1566 and June 1567, in his five-act play Mary Stewart (1951), first produced in Glasgow by the Citizens Theatre.
- Sarah Miles portrayed Mary Queen of Scots on Broadway and the West End in the play Vivat! Vivat Regina! (1971) written by her husband Robert Bolt
- Martha Graham choreographed and directed the modern dance titled "Episodes" (1985) that premiered at Lincoln Center, New York, the dance featured Mary Queen of Scots and Elizabeth I resolving their dynastic issues over a game of tennis.
- The Scottish playwright Liz Lochhead explored the relationship between Elizabeth I and Mary Stuart in her play Mary Queen of Scots Got Her Head Chopped Off.
- Mary's imprisonment and trial are the subject of the play (in verse) The Lifeblood by poet Glyn Maxwell.
- Maria Stuart – Königin der Schotten (Waldau Theater Bremen)
- The events of Mary's execution are referenced in playwright Peter Shaffer's play Lettice and Lovage.

== See also ==
- Cultural depictions of Elizabeth I of England
