= Cultural depictions of Catherine of Aragon =

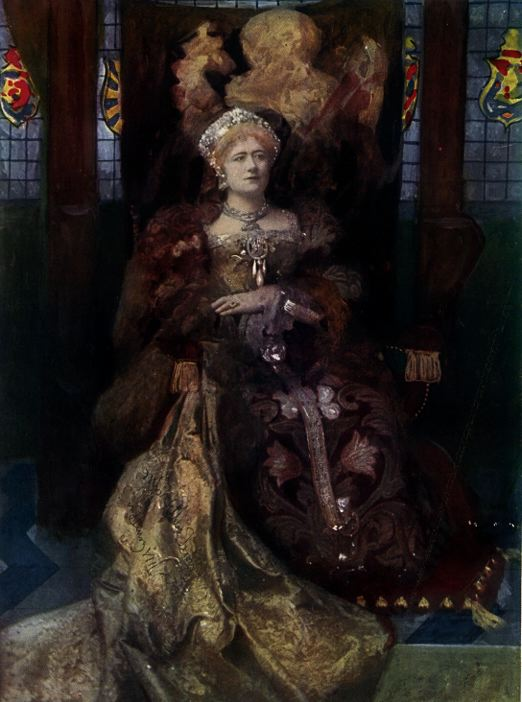
Dame Ellen Terry as Catherine of Aragon

Catherine of Aragon was Queen of England from June 1509 until May 1533 as the first wife of King Henry VIII when she was 23 to 47 years old. She has been portrayed in film, television, plays, novels, songs, poems, and other creative forms many times, and as a result, she has stayed very much in popular memory.

== In art and media ==
The first episode of The Six Wives of Henry VIII, is told from her point of view (and in which she is portrayed by Annette Crosbie). Charlotte Hope plays her in the STARZ mini-series The Spanish Princess, which is based on the book The Constant Princess by Philippa Gregory. William Shakespeare's play Henry VIII succeeds in recreating with great accuracy Catherine's statement about the legitimacy of her marriage at the court in Blackfriars before King Henry, and Shakespeare's portrayal of Catherine is remarkably sympathetic; however, most of the rest of the play is an attempt to absolve many, especially Henry VIII, and the timing of key incidents (including Catherine's death) is changed and other events are avoided (the play makes Henry nearly an innocent pawn in the hands of a dastardly Cardinal Wolsey, and the play stops short of Anne Boleyn's execution).

In January 2013, the National Portrait Gallery in London revealed that its curators had recently discovered that a portrait at Lambeth Palace, formerly believed to have been a portrait of Catherine Parr, in fact depicts Catherine of Aragon. The National Portrait Gallery announced that the painting, which had hung in a private sitting room of the Archbishop of Canterbury since at least the 19th century, would be paired with a portrait of Henry VIII already in the museum's collection, and would remain at the museum on loan.

=== Music and rhymes ===
- The song "Green groweth the holly" is said to have been written for her by Henry VIII.
- In the children's nursery rhyme "I Had a Little Nut Tree" she is the "King of Spain's Daughter."
- In Rick Wakeman's album The Six Wives of Henry VIII, "Catherine of Aragon" is listed as Track no. 1.

=== Books ===
Catherine is the main character in:

- Katharine, The Virgin Widow, The Shadow of the Pomegranate, and The King's Secret Matter (later published in an omnibus Katharine of Aragon) by Jean Plaidy
- My Catalina by Maureen Peters
- The King's Pleasure (1969) by Norah Lofts
- The Constant Princess (2005) by Philippa Gregory (a novel about Catherine's younger years)
- Patience, Princess Catherine by Carolyn Meyer (young adult novel)
- Catherine of Aragon/My Tudor Queen by Alison Prince
- Katherine of Aragon, The True Queen by Alison Weir
- The Spanish Queen (2013) NY by Carolly Erickson

Catherine is a character in:

- Murder Most Royal (1949) by Jean Plaidy
- The Trusted Servant by Alison Macleod
- The Other Boleyn Girl (2001), The King's Curse (2014) and Three Sisters, Three Queens (2016) by Philippa Gregory
- The Dark Rose, Volume 2 of The Morland Dynasty, by Cynthia Harrod-Eagles
- Wolf Hall (2009) by Hilary Mantel
- I, Elizabeth by Rosalind Miles
- The Favored Queen (2011) by Carolly Erickson

=== Theater, film, stage, and TV ===
==== Film ====
Catherine was portrayed by:

- Violet Vanbrugh in the 1911 short film production of William Shakespeare's play Henry VIII (first film portrayal).
- German actress Hedwig Pauly-Winterstein in the 1920 film Anna Boleyn.
- Rosalie Crutchley in The Sword and the Rose (1953), an account of Mary Tudor's romance with the Duke of Suffolk in 1515.
- Greek actress Irene Papas in Hal B. Wallis' film Anne of the Thousand Days (1969).
- Frances Cuka in the 1972 film Henry VIII and His Six Wives, based on the BBC 1970 TV series. Keith Michell reprised his role as Henry VIII. A scene was incorporated between Frances Cuka and Charlotte Rampling (playing Anne Boleyn) to show their quiet, glacial enmity.
- Ana Torrent in the 2008 film adaptation of The Other Boleyn Girl, with Eric Bana as Henry VIII.

==== TV ====
Catherine was portrayed by:

- British actress Annette Crosbie in a 90-minute television drama titled "Catherine of Aragon", the first part of the BBC series The Six Wives of Henry VIII (1970), for which she won the 1971 BAFTA TV Award for Best Actress.
- Spanish actress Yolanda Vasquez, a brief appearance in the British TV version of The Other Boleyn Girl (January 2003), opposite Jared Harris as Henry VIII and Natascha McElhone as Mary Boleyn.
- Assumpta Serna in the October 2003 ITV two-part television drama Henry VIII, which starred Ray Winstone in the title role. Part 1 chronicled the king's life from the birth of his bastard son, Henry Fitzroy until the execution of Anne Boleyn in 1536. David Suchet co-starred as Cardinal Wolsey.
- Marge Simpson (voiced by Julie Kavner), as "Margerine of Aragon" in The Simpsons episode "Margical History Tour" (2004).
- Maria Doyle Kennedy in the Showtime 2007 television series The Tudors opposite Jonathan Rhys Meyers as Henry. For her performance, Kennedy won an IFTA Award for Best Actress in a Supporting Role Television, and a Gemini Award for an Actress in a Featured Supporting Role in a Dramatic Series.
- In 2008 she was played by Victoria Peiró in the film The Twisted Tale of Bloody Mary.
- Natalia Rodríguez Arroyo in the Spanish historical series Isabel (2012).
- Joanne Whalley in Wolf Hall (2015).
- Mélida Molina in the Spanish historical series Carlos, rey emperador (2015).
- Jessica Ransom in Horrible Histories (2015 TV Series).
- Charlotte Hope portrays Catherine in the Starz mini-series The Spanish Princess which is based on two novels by Philippa Gregory. The series aired in May 2019.
- Drag queen Choriza May portrayed Catherine of Aragon in the Snatch Game episode of RuPaul's Drag Race: UK vs the World Series 2 (2024) opposite Tia Kofi as Anne Boleyn.

==== Theatre ====
- Sarah Siddons in the 18th century, in Shakespeare's Henry VIII. She told Samuel Johnson that the role of Queen Catherine was her favourite of all the Shakespearean roles she had played, as it was "the most natural".
- Virginia Weeks portrayed her in the play Six Dead Queens and an Inflatable Henry.
- Kate Duchêne in a 2010 adaptation of Shakespeare's Henry VIII at Shakespeare's Globe Theatre.
- Jarneia Richard-Noel in the 2017 musical Six, by Toby Marlow and Lucy Moss. It opened on the West End in 2019.
- Adrianna Hicks in the Broadway production of Six the Musical, which opened in October 2021.

==== Documentaries ====
- Annabelle Dowler in Dr. David Starkey's 2001 documentary series The Six Wives of Henry VIII.
- She is played by Siobhan Hewlett in the 2009 documentary Henry VIII: The Mind of a Tyrant.
- Paola Bontempi in the BBC One history programme Six Wives with Lucy Worsley (2016).
- Hannah Lee portrays Catherine in "Henry VIII: Man, Monarch, Monster"
