= East Indiaman =

Merchant ships operating under charter or license to European East India companies

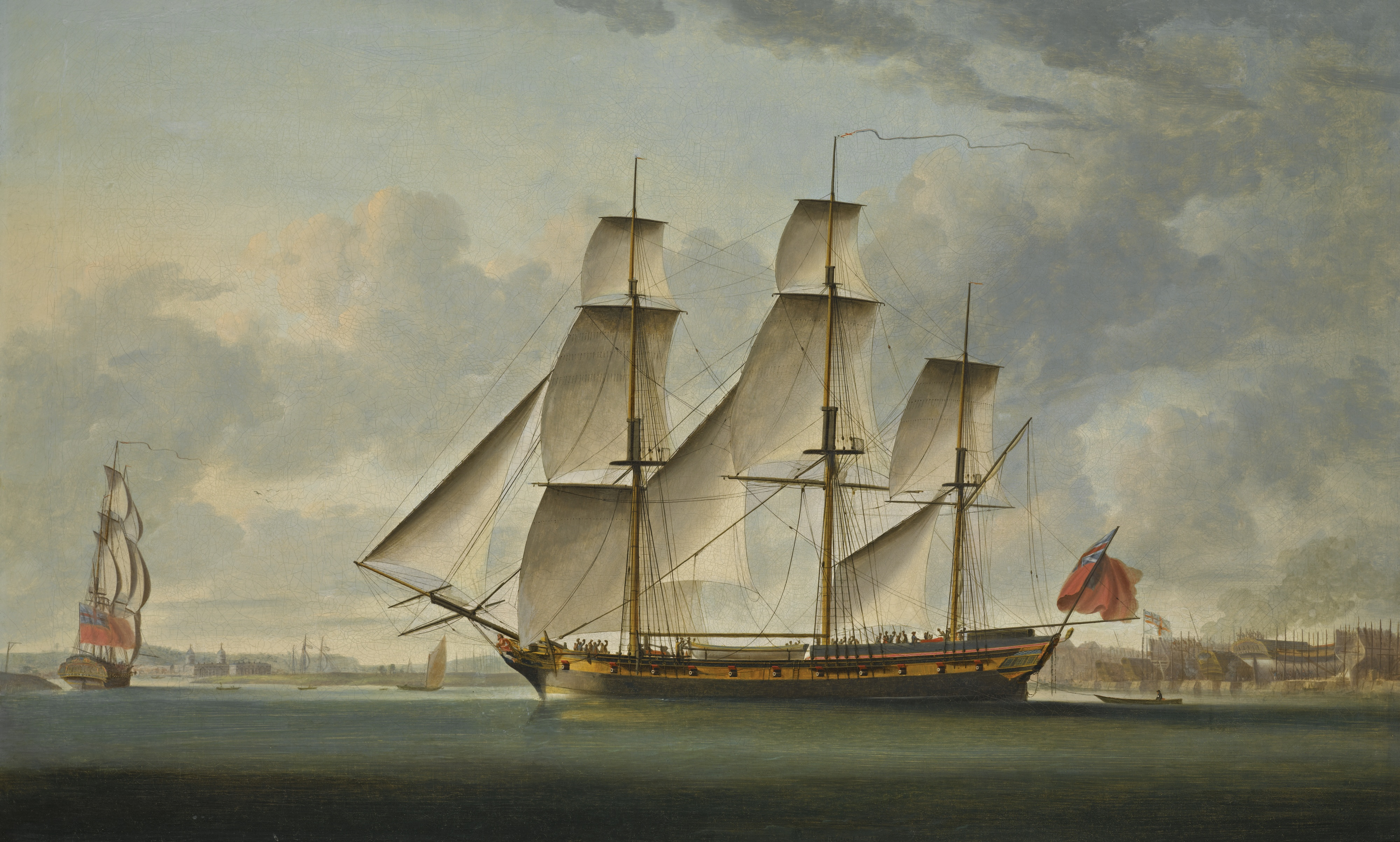
1787 painting of the British East Indiaman Delaford in two positions

East Indiamen were merchant ships that operated under charter or licence for European trading companies which traded with the East Indies between the 17th and 19th centuries. The term was commonly used to refer to vessels belonging to the British, Dutch, French, Danish, Swedish, Austrian or Portuguese East India companies.

Several East Indiamen chartered by the British East India Company (EIC) were known as clippers. The EIC held a monopoly granted to it by Elizabeth I in 1600 for all English trade between the Cape of Good Hope and Cape Horn. This grant was progressively restricted during the late 18th and early 19th centuries, until the monopoly was lost in 1834. EIC East Indiamen usually ran between Britain, the Cape of Good Hope and India, where their primary destinations were the ports of Bombay, Madras and Calcutta.

EIC East Indiamen often continued on to China before returning to England via the Cape of Good Hope and Saint Helena. When the EIC lost its monopoly, the ships of this design were sold off. A smaller, faster ship known as a Blackwall Frigate was built for the trade as the need to carry heavy armaments declined.

== Description of the sailing vessels and the trade ==
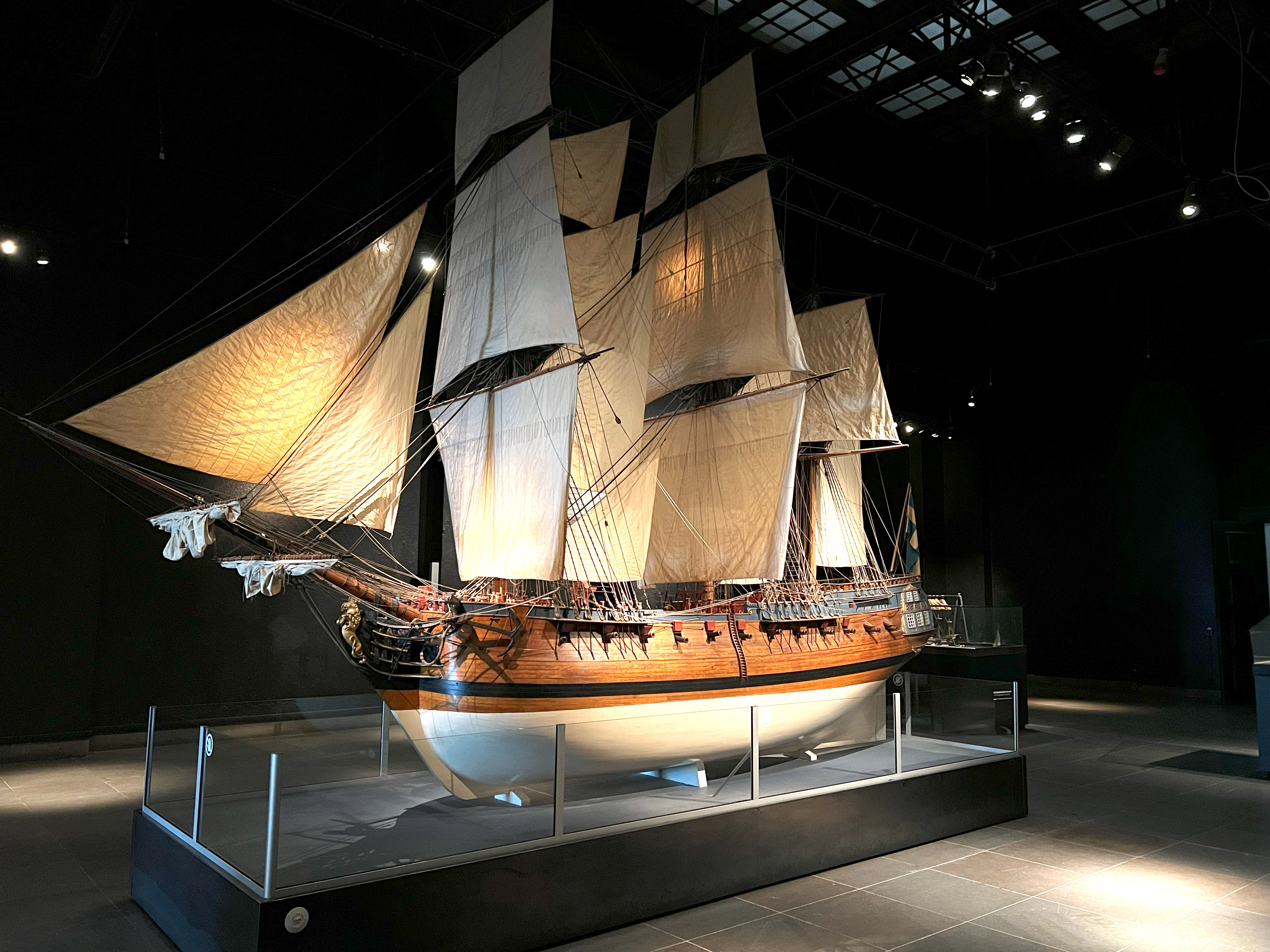
Model of a Swedish East India Company East Indiaman

East Indiamen vessels carried both passengers and goods, and were armed to defend themselves against pirates. Initially, the East Indiamen were built to carry as much cargo as possible, rather than for speed of sailing. The British East India Company had a monopoly on trade with India and China, supporting that design.

East Indiamen were the largest merchant ships regularly built during the late 18th and early 19th centuries, generally measuring between 1100 and 1400 tons burthen (bm). Two of the largest were the Earl of Mansfield and Lascelles being built at Deptford in 1795. The Royal Navy purchased both, converted them to 56-gun fourth rates, and renamed them Weymouth and Madras respectively. They measured 1426 tons (bm) on dimensions of approximately 175 feet overall length of hull, 144 feet keel, 43 feet beam, 17 feet draft.

In England, Queen Elizabeth I granted an exclusive right to the trade to the East India Company in 1600, a monopoly which lasted until 1834. The company grew to encompass more than the trade between England and India, but the ships described in this article are the type used in the 17th to the early 19th centuries to carry the trade.

Captain Robert William Eastwick gives an account of how EIC ships were chartered in his 1836 manuscript. As was the custom at least by 1791, ships were chartered from their owners, and were often used for four round trip voyages after which they were then considered "worn out." About thirty ships were required per season. When a ship was to be chartered, the owner chose a captain from a selection of applicants or interested parties. The post of captain was "sold" to the prospective captain for as much as 8,000-10,000 pounds per appointment. After the sale of the post, the command was considered transferable property, and could be resold to the highest bidder or passed to an heir. Additionally, the captain had the right to free outbound freight to the extent of fifty tons, and twenty tons on the return trip. This was extremely lucrative, and a prudent commander could average between 4,000 and 5,000 pounds per voyage, sometimes as high as 12,000 pounds. However, in the early 19th century this custom was completely abolished, because it significantly raised the rates of freight. At the time of its abolishment, all captains then in service were given a compensation and removed if necessary. From that point on, a person not qualified to command could not obtain the post, and the command of EIC vessels became merit based.

== French Revolutionary and Napoleonic Wars ==
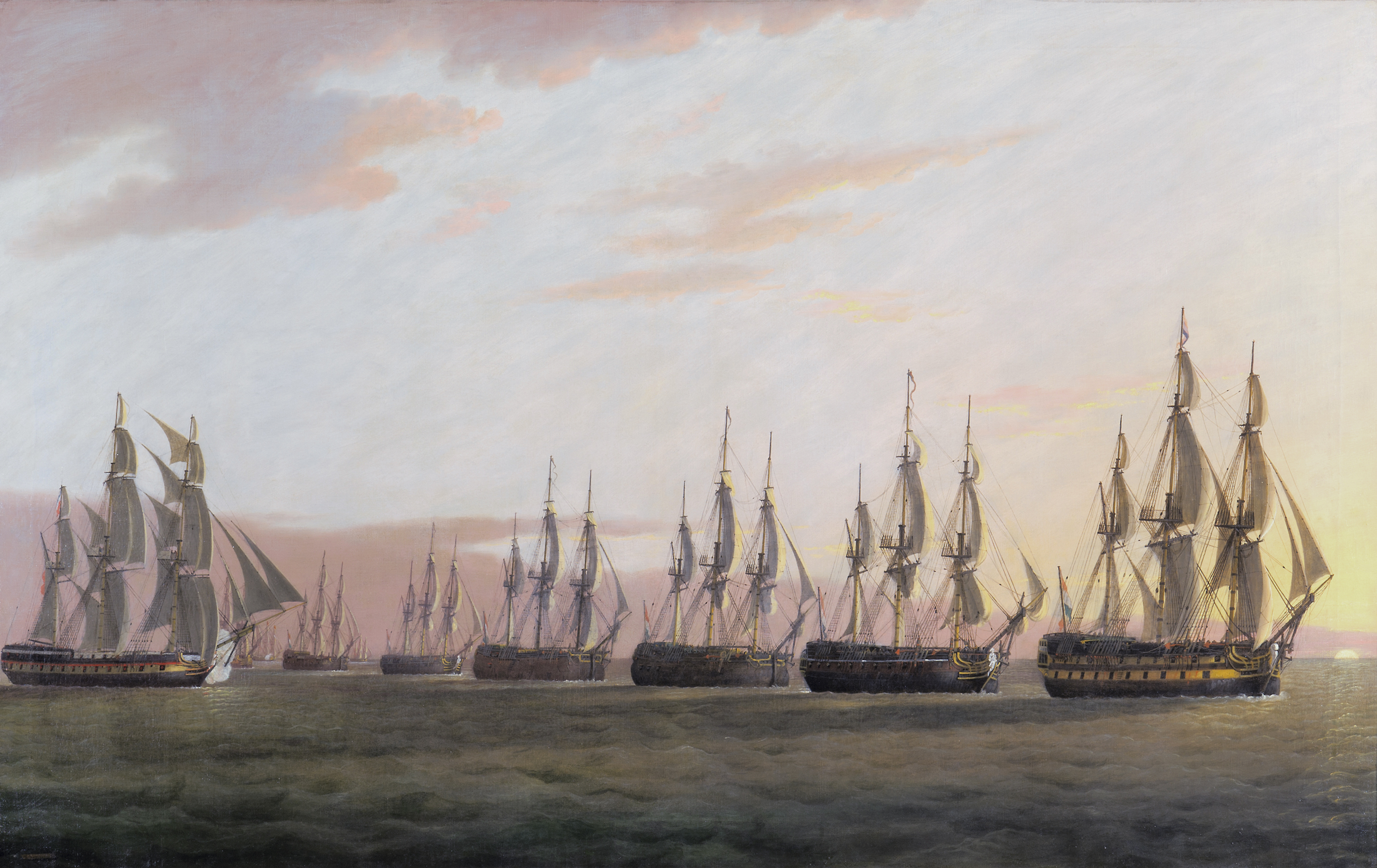
Painting of the British East Indiaman General Goddard attacking seven Dutch East Indiamen on 14 June 1795

During the French Revolutionary and Napoleonic Wars, East Indiamen were often painted to resemble warships; an attacker could not be sure if gunports were real or merely paint, and some Indiamen carried sizable armaments. The Royal Navy acquired several East Indiamen, turning them into fourth rates (e.g., HMS Weymouth and HMS Madras, described above), maintaining the confusion for military ships seeking merchant ships as prizes of war. In some cases the East Indiamen successfully fought off attacks by the French. One of the most celebrated of these incidents occurred in 1804, when a fleet of East Indiamen and other merchant vessels under Commodore Nathaniel Dance successfully fought off a marauding squadron commanded by Admiral Linois in the Indian Ocean in the Battle of Pulo Aura.

Due to the need to carry heavy cannon, the hull of the East Indiamen – in common with most warships of the time – was much wider at the waterline than at the upper deck, so that guns carried on the upper deck were closer to the centre-line to aid stability. This is known as tumblehome. The ships normally had two complete decks for accommodation within the hull and a raised poop deck. The poop deck and the deck below it were lit with square-windowed galleries at the stern. To support the weight of the galleries, the hull lines towards the stern were full. Later ships built without this feature tended to sail faster, which put the East Indiamen at a commercial disadvantage once the need for heavy armament passed.

== Ships for the India–China trade ==
According to historian Fernand Braudel, some of the finest and largest Indiamen of the late 18th and early 19th centuries were built in India, making use of Indian shipbuilding techniques while also crewed by Indians, their hulls of Indian teak being especially suitable for local waters. These ships were used for the China run. Until the coming of steamships, these Indian-built ships were relied upon almost exclusively by the British in the eastern seas. Many hundreds of Indian-built Indiamen were built for the British, along with other ships, including warships. Notable among them were Surat Castle (1791), a 1,000-ton (bm) ship with a crew of 150, Lowjee Family, of 800 tons (bm) and a crew of 125, and Shampinder (1802), of 1,300 tons (bm).

== Notable ships ==
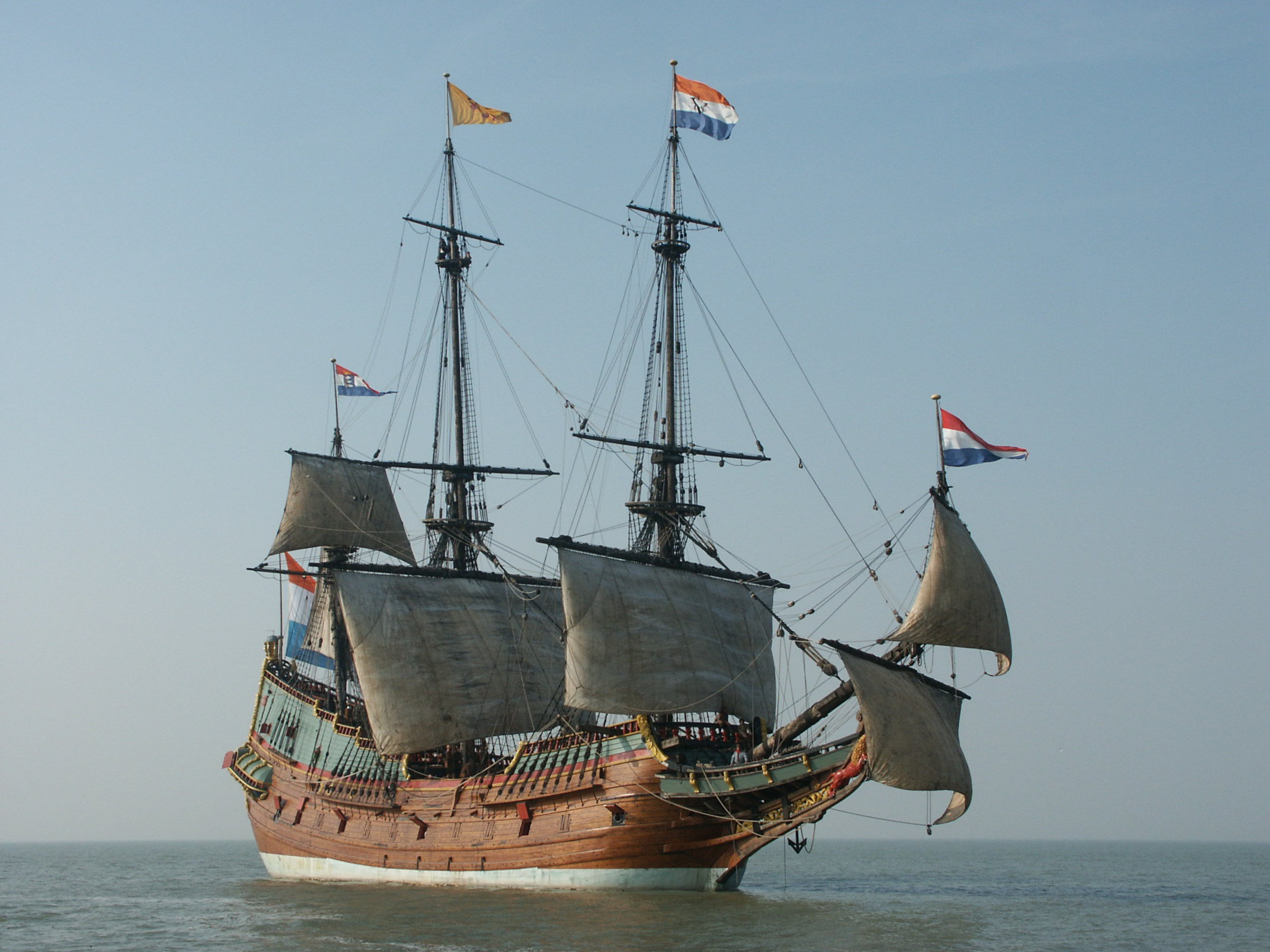
The Batavia (1628 ship) was a ship of the Dutch East India Company (VOC).

Another significant East Indiaman in this period was the 1176-ton (bm) Warley that John Perry built at his Blackwall Yard in 1788, and which the Royal Navy bought in 1795 and renamed HMS Calcutta. In 1803 she was employed as a transport to establish a settlement at Port Phillip in Australia, later shifted to the site of current-day Hobart, Tasmania by an accompanying ship, the Ocean. French forces captured Calcutta in 1805 off the Isles of Scilly. She grounded at the Battle of the Basque Roads in 1809, and was burned by a British boarding party after her French crew had abandoned her.

The 1200-ton (bm) Arniston was likewise employed by the Royal Navy as a troop transport between England and Ceylon. In 1815, she was wrecked near Cape Agulhas with the loss of 372 lives after a navigation error that was caused by inaccurate dead reckoning and the lack of a marine chronometer with which to calculate her longitude.

== End of the era ==
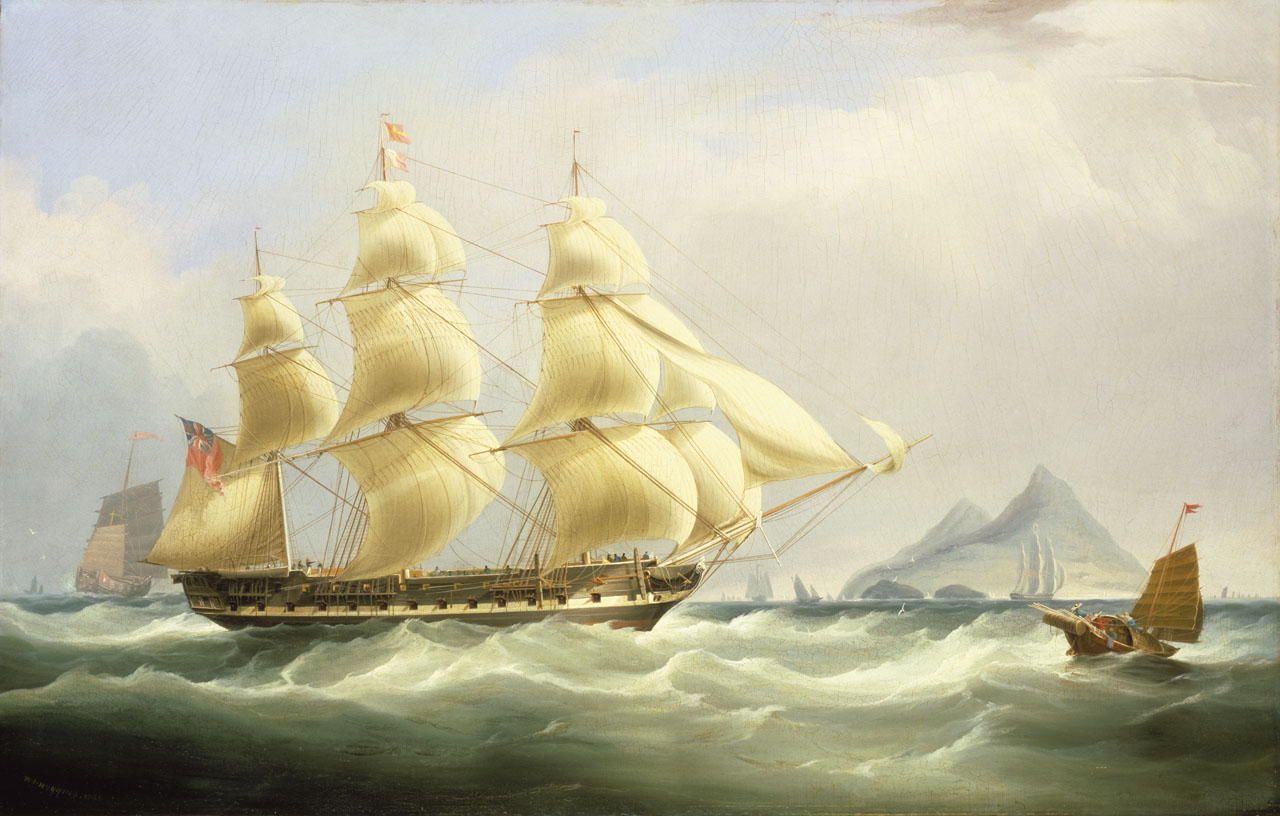
1836 painting of the British East Indiaman Asia

With the progressive restriction of the monopoly of the British East India Company the desire to build such large armed ships for commercial use waned, and during the late 1830s a smaller, faster ship known as a Blackwall Frigate was built for the premium end of the India and China trades. The last of the East Indiamen was reputed to be the Java (1813–1939) that became a coal hulk, then was broken up.

A ship named Lalla Rookh, involved in an incident in November 1850 off Worthing, West Sussex, in which many local men died after their rescue boat capsized, was described as an East Indiaman bringing sugar and rum from Pernambuco, Brazil.

== In literature ==
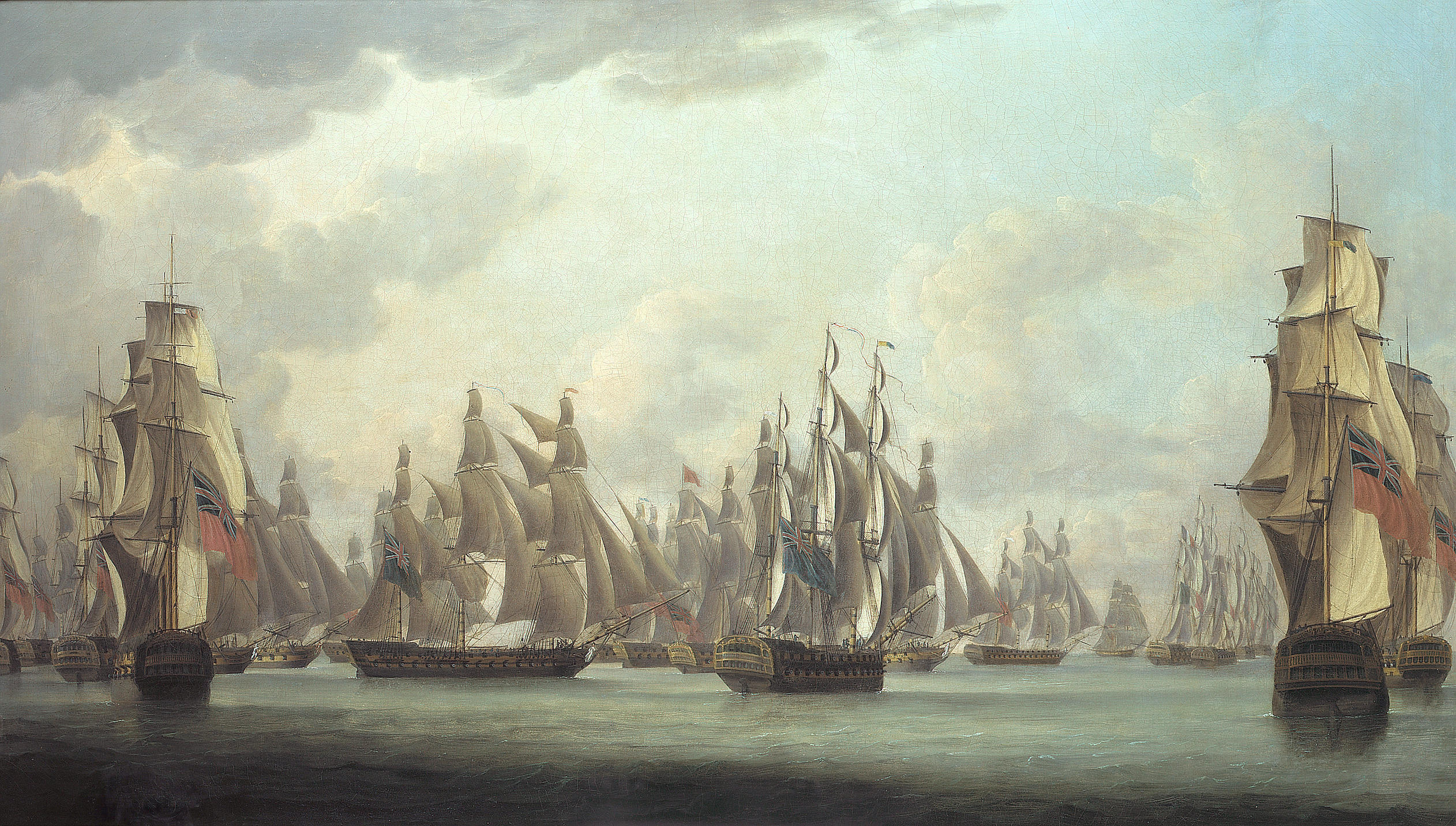
1804 painting of the Battle of Pulo Aura

- The Battle of Pulo Aura is featured in Patrick O'Brian's novel HMS Surprise, with French Counter-admiral Charles-Alexandre Léon Durand Linois in pursuit of a large fleet of British East Indiamen. In the novel, Surprise under Captain Jack Aubrey organises the merchantmen to defeat Linois' squadron. In history, all the ships that defeated the French squadron were merchantmen.
- The Black Pearl in the movie series Pirates of the Caribbean is based on the East Indiaman
- In the Aubrey–Maturin series, East Indiamen are involved in many of the novels, including the second set in the Peace of Amiens, where some of the sailors took positions on East Indiamen. In other of the novels, Aubrey intercepts enemy vessels that interfere with the merchant ships, earning their gratitude.
- Stuart Turton's 2020 novel The Devil and the Dark Water is mostly set on a Dutch Indiaman in 1634.
- In Jane Austen's 1814 novel Mansfield Park, one of Fanny Price's brothers is a midshipman on an Indianman.

== Selected examples ==
Name	Nationality	Length (m)	Tons burthen	Service	Fate	Comments
Admiral Gardner	British	44	816	1797–1809	stranded	Blown ashore on Goodwin Sands with the death of one crew member. Wreck located in 1985 with plenty of coins (mostly copper) salvaged.
Agamemnon	British			1855		
Albemarle	British	?	?	?–1708	stranded	Blown ashore near Polperro, Cornwall, with her freight of diamonds, coffee, pepper, silk and indigo. The ship was a total loss and little of the freight ever recovered, yet it is said that most of her crew survived. The location of the wreck is still unknown.
Amsterdam	Dutch	42.5	1100	1749	beached	Lost on maiden voyage. Wreck still visible at low tide off Bulverhythe, Bexhill-on-Sea, reputed to be the best preserved wreck because of the covering of fine sinking sand. Protected under UK law. Can be dangerous to visit because of sinking sands.
Arniston	British	54	1200	1794–1815	wrecked	Longitude navigational error due to her not having a chronometer. Only 6 of the 378 on board survived. The seaside resort of Arniston, Western Cape, South Africa, is named after the wreck.
Atlas	British	50.5	1267	1813–1830	broken up	She arrived at Gravesend at the end of her last voyage in August 1830 and was sold in May 1831 to C. Carter for breaking. Carter paid £4,100 for the 'Atlas', not a large sum and with a considerable part of the value being no doubt in her furnishings.
Batavia	Dutch East India Company	56.6	1200	1628–1629	sunk	Struck a reef on Beacon Island off Western Australia but most of the crew and passengers made it to a nearby island. In 1970, the remains of the ship and many artefacts were salvaged.
Bredenhof	Dutch East India Company	41	850	1746–1753	sunk	Foundered on a reef thirteen miles off the African coast on 6 June 1753 carrying 30 chests of silver and gold ingots. Her cargo was recovered in 1986.
Bonhomme Richard	France/USA	46	998	1779	sunk	Former French East India Company (as the Duc de Duras), gift to the US revolutionaries. Sunk in battle during the Revolutionary War.
Candia	Dutch East India Company	150 ft 0 in (45.72 m)	1150 tons	1788–1796	Dismantled in Batavia in 1796	Depicted by Dutch maritime artist Gerrit Groenewegen (1754–1826) near Rotterdam in 1789.
Ceylon	British	?	?	?	Captured	Captured in the action of 3 July 1810
Cumberland	British	40.8	1350	?	Sold	The ship was sold to the revolutionary Chilean government 1818 and renamed San Martín. 1821 sunk in Peru
David Clark	British	39.7	608	1816	Broken up 1854 at Batavia	
Diemermeer	Dutch	?	?	?	Wrecked on the Banana Islands, Sierra Leone, 1748	The Captain, Christoffel Boort, and some surviving crew members built themselves a fort on the Banana Islands, but became embroiled in a dispute with the inhabitants. They were accused of kidnapping three children.
Doddington	British	?	499	?–1755	wrecked in Algoa Bay	23 survivors out of 270 marooned for some time on Bird Island. Ship carried a significant quantity of gold and silver, some of which was later illegally marine salvaged, with the ensuing legal battle influencing the UNESCO Convention on the Protection of the Underwater Cultural Heritage
Dutton	British	?	755	1781–1796	stranded	Chartered to the government to carry troops, blown ashore on Plymouth Hoe, most of the crew and passengers rescued by Sir Edward Pellew.
Earl of Abergavenny (I)	British	48.9	1182	1789–1794	Sold	Sold to the Admiralty in 1795
Earl of Abergavenny (II)	British	53.9	1460	1796–1805	Wrecked, with more than 250 lives lost	The wreck is located at Weymouth Bay, in England.
Earl of Mansfield (I)	British	?	782	1777–1790	Sunk	Sunk in 1790
Earl of Mansfield (II)	British	?	1416	1795–?	?	
Earl of Mornington	British			1799–1808		Packet ship
Exeter	British		1265	1792–1811+	Unknown	During the action of 4 August 1800 Exeter captured the French frigate Médée , the only instance of a merchantman capturing a large warship during the French Revolutionary Wars. In February 1804 she was present at the Battle of Pulo Aura.
Friendship of Salem	East India Marine Society	171 ft 10 in (52.37 m)		1797–1812	Captured by the British	Captured as a prize of war by the British in September 1812
General Goddard	British	143 ft 10 in (43.84 m)	799	1782–1799	Captured	On 15 June 1795 captured seven Dutch East Indiamen off St Helena; Captured by the Spanish in the West Indies; subsequent fate unknown
Gosforth	British		810	1856–?		
Götheborg	Swedish	40.9	788	1739–1745	sunk	Sank off Gothenburg in 1745
Grosvenor	British	?	729 tons	?	sunk	Sank off the Pondoland coast of South Africa, north of the mouth of the Umzimvubu River on 4 August 1782. Of 150 crew and passengers there were 123 survivors of whom only 18 made it to land alive.
Horssen	Dutch East India Company	93 ft 0 in (28.35 m)	880 tons	1784–1792	Put out of service in Goeree in 1792	Transported Mary Bryant on a voyage from Batavia, 21 December 1791, to Cape Town, arriving on 19 March 1792.
Java	British	48.5 m (159 ft 2in.)	1175 tons	1813–1827	Converted to Coal Hulk	Built in 1813 at Calcutta, became a troop ship in 1827. Later served as an Australian migrant ship, and merchant ship serving Asia. Reputed as the last East Indiaman, taken to Gibraltar about 1860 as coal hulk number 16 and scrapped in 1939.
Jonkheer Meester Van de Putterstock	Dutch	?	?	?	sank	The Jonkheer Meester Van de Putterstock with a cargo of sugar, coffee, spices and Banca tin with a value of £50,000 was wrecked under Angrouse Cliff near Mullion Cove, Cornwall in March 1667.
Joanna	British	?	?	?	Wrecked	Wrecked near Cape Agulhas on 8 June 1682
Kent	British	?	820	1800	Captured	Captured by Robert Surcouf, Bay of Bengal.
Kent	British	?	1,350	1825	Burned at sea	She was lost in 1825 on her third voyage to China, shortly after setting out. Some 550 persons of the 650 passengers and crew were saved.
Lord Nelson	British			1799		
Nemesis	British			1839		First British-built ocean-going iron warship
Nossa Senhora dos Mártires	Portuguese	?	?	1605–1606	Sunk	Struck a submerged rock at the mouth of the River Tagus, near Lisbon, and went down close to shore. Wreck located in 1994, and excavated between 1996 and 2001.
Ogle Castle	British	?	?	1803–1825	Wrecked	When Ogle Castle docked at Bombay in May 1825, the crew mutinied and were held in jail until loading was complete; on the return voyage, it was driven onto the Goodwin Sands on 3 November 1825, with the loss of over 100 crew members.
Ponsborne	British	43.6	804	1780–1796	Wrecked	Sailed ports such as Bombay and China. Requisitioned for an expedition against the French in the West Indies in 1795, was wrecked off the coast of Granada on 26 March 1796.
Red Dragon (also Dragon)	British	?	300	1601–1619	Sunk	Was the flagship of the first voyage of the English East India Company in 1601. Sunk by Dutch fleet.
Repulse	British	?	1334	1820–1830	?	
Royal Captain	British	44	860	1772–3	sunk	Struck a reef in the South China Sea, 3 lives and the entire freight was lost. Wreck located in 1999.
Sussex	British	?	490	1736–1738	sunk	Sunk off Mozambique, located in 1987. No actual wreck, but the freight was dispersed over a large area on the Bassas da India atoll due to wave movement. Several cannon, two anchors and thousands of porcelain fragments were salvaged.
Tryal	British	?	500	1621–1622	sunk	The likely wreck site was found in 1969 off Western Australia (Monte Bello Islands). At least 95 of the crew of 143 were lost and due to use of explosives while searching for treasures, there are only very few remains.
Windham	British	36.2	830	1800–1828	Scrapped	The French captured Windham at the action of 18 November 1809, but the British recaptured her in December. The French again captured her at the action of 3 July 1810, but the British recaptured her at the Battle of Grand Port. Windham was sold to the revolutionary Chilean government 1818 and renamed Lautaro. Beached at Valparaiso and scrapped 27 September 1828

== Sailing replicas ==
Several East Indiamen have been reconstructed in recent decades. Some of these are (semi) permanently moored and can be visited as part of a museum collection.

Name	Nationality	Replica of	Original service	Replica construction period	Replica length (m)	Status
Amsterdam	Dutch	Amsterdam	1748–1749	1985–1991	48	Moored at the Dutch National Maritime Museum (Amsterdam, Netherlands)
Batavia	Dutch	Batavia	1628–1629	1985–1995	56	Moored at the Dutch Batavialand museum (former Bataviawerf, Lelystad, Netherlands)
Götheborg III	Swedish	Götheborg I	1738–1745	1995–2003	58	Sailing (August 2022)

== In other media ==
The 2018 video game Return of the Obra Dinn features an East Indiaman as the fictional title vessel, with gameplay requiring players to thoroughly explore a 3D model of the ship and observe the crew's activities.

Empire: Total War features Indiaman as the primary Trading Ship for the European, Indian as well as the United States faction in game. Players move one or several of these ships to "trade nodes" in West or East Africa, Brazil or the East Indies to gain significant trade profit.

== See also ==
- East India Company (disambiguation)
- Armed merchantman
- Chinaman (ship), a ship used to transport colonial goods from China
- Guineaman, a ship used to transport slaves from the region of Guinea
- West Indiaman, a ship used to transport colonial goods from the West Indies
- French frigate Brillant (1757)
