= Miles Kerr-Peterson =

Miles Kerr-Peterson is an author and historian.

== Career ==
After study at Bridgwater College, Miles Kerr-Peterson gained a PhD at the University of Glasgow in 2016. His research concerned the career of George Keith, 5th Earl Marischal (1554–1623) and resulted in a monograph. Kerr–Peterson has edited financial records concerning the marriage of James VI and Anne of Denmark for publication by the Scottish History Society. He also researched Keith Marischal House in East Lothian and its chapel with archaeologists and the Castle Studies Trust.

Kerr-Peterson edited a volume of the collected essays of the historian Jenny Wormald. Kerr-Peterson is active member of the Bridgwater Heritage Group in Somerset. Working with Michelle Craig, he has republished the writings of Christina MacDonald MacQueen, a resident of St Kilda who described life on the island before the 1930 evacuation.

== Selected publications ==
- James VI and I: Collected Essays by Jenny Wormald (Birlinn, 2026).
- (with Dr. Michelle H Craig), eds, St Kilda: My Island Home: Christina MacDonald MacQueen (Birlinn, 2025).
- (with Michael Pearce), "King James VI's English Subsidy and Danish Dowry Accounts, 1588–1596", Miscellany of the Scottish History Society, XVI (Boydell, 2020), pp. 1–94.
- A Protestant Lord in James VI's Scotland: George Keith, Fifth Earl Marischal (Boydell, 2019).
- (with Steven J. Reid), eds, James VI and Noble Power in Scotland (Routledge, 2017).
- "Sir William Keith of Delny: Courtier, ambassador and agent of noble power", Innes Review, 67:2 (2016), pp. 138–158. doi:10.3366/inr.2016.0124
