= Gosforth (disambiguation) =

Gosforth is a suburb of the city of Newcastle upon Tyne, Tyne and Wear, England.

Gosforth may also refer to:

== United Kingdom ==
=== Gosforth, Tyne and Wear ===
- Gosforth Urban District, extant from 1895 to 1974
- Gosforth Academy, a school
- Gosforth Rugby Football Club
- Gosforth Football Club, now known as Newcastle Red Bulls

=== Others ===
- Gosforth, Cumbria, village, civil parish and electoral ward in Cumbria, England
- Gosforth Secondary Modern School, now known as Dronfield Henry Fanshawe School

== Australia ==
- Gosforth, New South Wales, situated in City of Maitland, Hunter Region

== Other uses ==
- Gosforth (ship), 19th-century timber ship built in North Shields, England

== See also ==
- Peter Taylor, Baron Taylor of Gosforth (1930–1997), Lord Chief Justice of England
