= James Martin (convict) =

James Martin (ca. 1760 - ?) was a convict transported to New South Wales, notable for being the author of the only extant First Fleet convict account of life in the colony, known as the Memorandoms by James Martin.

== Early life ==
James Martin was born ca. 1760 in Ballymena, County Antrim, Ireland. He had a wife and son in Exeter and had worked in England for seven years when, at Exeter Assizes on 20 March 1786, he was sentenced to transportation for seven years for stealing eleven screw bolts and other goods, valued at 11 shillings, from Powderham Castle. He was held on the Dunkirk hulk for almost a year. His official report from the Dunkirk hulk was that he was "tolerably decent and orderly". On 11 March 1787, Martin was placed upon the Charlotte and sent to New South Wales as part of the First Fleet. Martin was a useful tradesman in Sydney.

== Escape from New South Wales ==
On the night of 28 March 1791, Martin, William and Mary Bryant and their children Charlotte and Emanuel, James Cox, William Allen, Samuel Bird, Samuel Broom, Nathaniel Lillie, and William Morton stole the colony's fishing boat, and rowed out of Sydney Harbour and into the Pacific Ocean.

During the voyage back to England, William, Charlotte, and Emanuel Bryant, James Cox, Samuel Bird, and William Morton died. The survivors, rather than being prosecuted on the capital charge of returning from transportation, were instead ordered on 5 July 1792 to serve out the remainder of their respective sentences of transportation in Newgate gaol. The lawyer and biographer James Boswell interceded with the government on their behalf, and on 2 May 1793 Mary Bryant was given an unconditional pardon, and the four men were discharged from Newgate by proclamation on 3 November 1793. Martin's fate after being released is unknown.

=== Portrayals ===
Martin was portrayed by John Ewart in the 1963 Australian Broadcasting Commission serial, The Hungry Ones.

== The Memorandoms ==
As well as being the only extant first-hand account of this famous escape, Memorandoms by James Martin is the earliest Australian convict narrative. The original manuscript is part of the vast manuscript archive of the philosopher Jeremy Bentham, held by University College London Library's Special Collections. The Memorandoms was first discovered by the Bentham scholar Charles Blount in the 1930s, who published a short edition, limited to 150 copies. A second edition of eleven pages, by Victor Crittenden, was published in 1991.

A new edition, Memorandoms by James Martin: An Astonishing Escape from Early New South Wales, edited by Tim Causer, was published in open access in 2017 by UCL Press. This new edition makes available, for the first time and for free, facsimiles of the original manuscript alongside an annotated transcript, alongside an introduction which puts the escape in context, and challenges many of the myths and legends which have grown around the Bryant party's escape.
