= The Unfaithful Queen =

Historical novel

- Author: Carolly Erickson
- Genre: Historical fiction
- Published: 2012
- Preceded by: The Favored Queen (2011)
- Followed by: The Spanish Queen (2013)

The Unfaithful Queen is a 2012 historical novel by Carolly Erickson.

== Plot summary ==
The book follows Catherine Howard, who is involved in complex romantic entanglements with figures like Henry Mannox and Francis Dereham. After marrying the boorish King Henry VIII, Catherine struggles to adapt to her role as queen.

== Reception ==
The book received mixed reviews from critics, its entertainment value was praised while its historical accuracy and characterization were criticized.
