= William Bryant (convict) =

Cornish escapee from Australia (c. 1757 – 1791)

William Bryant (c. 1757 – 1791) was a Cornish fisherman and convict who was transported to Australia on the First Fleet. He is remembered for his daring escape from the penal colony with his wife, two small children and seven convicts in the governor's cutter, sailing to Timor in a voyage that would come to rank alongside that of fellow Cornishman William Bligh as one of the most incredible ever made in an open boat.

== Convict ==
Little is known about Bryant's life before his appearance at Launceston assizes in March 1784. He is believed to be the William Bryant who was baptised in the church of St Uny, in the village of Lelant near St Ives, Cornwall, to parents William and Jane, in April 1757. Bryant worked, like the rest of his family, as a fisherman and mariner, but also became involved in smuggling and other illegal activities. In December 1783 he was apprehended at Bodmin and committed by the Mayor of St Ives for impersonating two Royal Navy seamen in order to obtain their wages. At the March assizes in Launceston he was sentenced to death, a sentence which was commuted to seven years' transportation. He was taken to the prison hulk Dunkirk at Plymouth. His age at that time was given as 26.

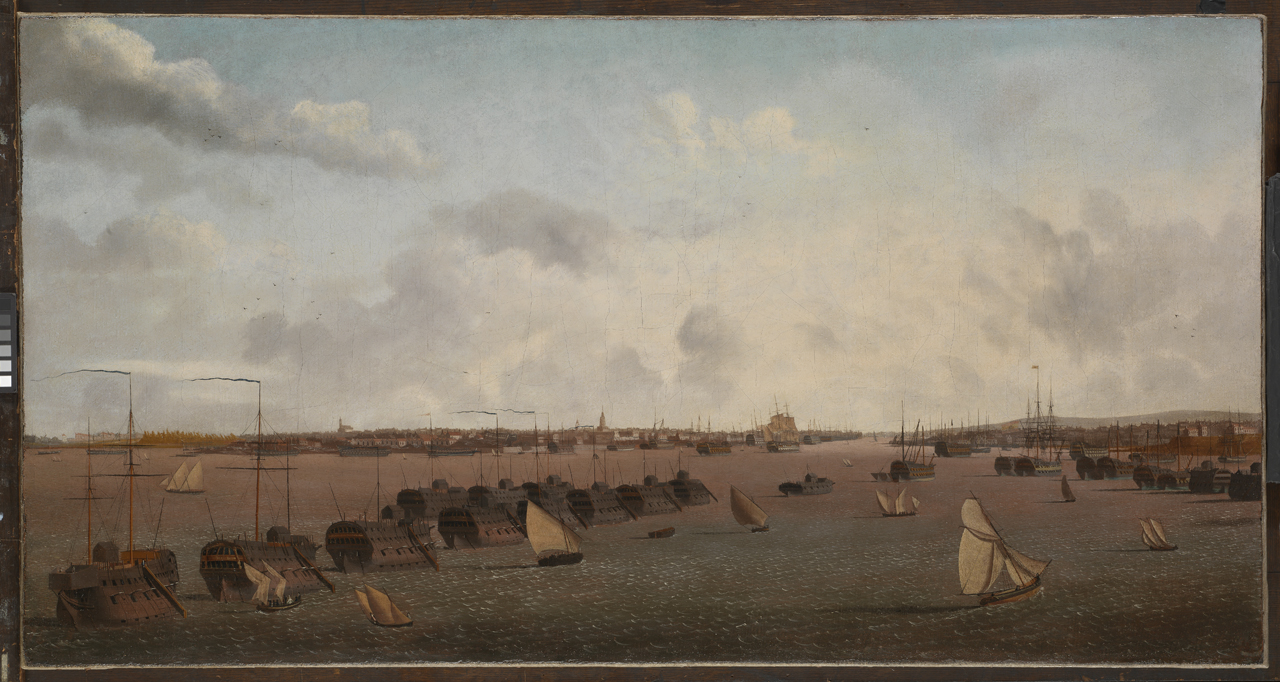
Prison hulks at Portsmouth

Following the American War of Independence it was no longer possible to transport convicts to colonies in America and prisoners sentenced to transportation were held on the prison hulks while the government decided on a new destination. Bryant was to serve 3 years of his sentence on the Dunkirk before departing for Australia on the first fleet of ships taking convicts to Botany Bay. During these three years on the hulk he was described as behaving "remarkably well".

The Dunkirk held women convicts as well as men, and in March 1786 Bryant's future wife Mary Broad arrived on board. Mary Broad, who was a fisherman's daughter from Fowey in Cornwall but lived in Plymouth, had been convicted of highway robbery at the Lent Assizes at Exeter and sentenced to death. Reprieved, she was then sentenced to seven years' transportation "beyond the seas". Also with the prisoners from Exeter was James Martin who was to join the Bryants on their escape attempt. Martin's behaviour on the Dunkirk was described as "tolerably decent and orderly". On the Dunkirk the quarters of the men and women were separated by an iron grille and it is unlikely that Bryant was the father of Mary Broad's first child, Charlotte, who was born on the voyage to Australia. More probably Charlotte resulted from a relationship with a gaoler or marine, although unusually for a child born to a transported woman the name of her father was not registered.

Another convict who would eventually form part of the escape party was James Cox. He arrived on the Dunkirk aged 24, already the veteran on one escape attempt. He had been sentenced to death at the Old Bailey for theft from a haberdashers, reprieved and sentenced to transportation. He had escaped from the Mercury, bound for Canada, when bad weather had forced the ship to put into Torbay and the convicts had overpowered the crew. Recaptured, he had again been sentenced to death and again reprieved. On the Dunkirk he was described as behaving "remarkably well".

== Transportation ==
On 13 May 1787 the First Fleet set sail for Australia. Bryant, together with James Martin, James Cox and Mary Broad, was on the Charlotte. The voyage to Australia, via the Canary Islands, Brazil, and the Cape of Good Hope, took eight months. On the way Mary Broad gave birth to a daughter, named Charlotte after the ship.

Port Jackson in 1788

The fleet arrived in Port Jackson in New South Wales on 26 January 1788. The original destination had been Botany Bay, but this area was deemed unsuitable for settlement. Within days Bryant and Mary Broad were married, one of five couples to be married by Reverend Richard Johnson in the first marriage ceremony in the new colony. Bryant signed his name on the register; Mary made her mark. Bryant's skills as a fisherman were in demand as the First Fleet had neglected to include enough people with knowledge of farming, fishing or gardening. He was put in charge of fishing and allowed to build a hut for his family in Farm Cove—a rare privilege for a convict. A year later, when rations were dwindling and the colony was going hungry, Bryant was caught holding back some of his catch for his own use and to swap for vegetables and was sentenced to 100 lashes. He was also evicted from his hut and put to work on the brick-making gang, but the colony soon found they could not do without his fishing skills and he returned to his hut and was put back in charge of fishing.

The following year, 1790, saw the arrival of a son for Bryant and his wife. He was given the name Emmanuel, which was a Bryant family name. It also saw the arrival of the Second Fleet. Bryant's sentence was due to expire in March 1791 and he would have been able to work his passage home to England. His wife, however, had a further two years of her sentence to run; since she would be unable to work her passage home she was in effect facing a lifetime in the colony. And the governor had announced that no convict, even if their sentence had expired, would be allowed to leave the colony if they left behind a wife and children who could not support themselves. Although supplies brought by the Second Fleet had warded off the threat of starvation for the time being, the long term prospects for the colony still looked bleak, and so the Bryants decided that escape was their only option.

== Escape ==
In December 1790 the Waaksamheyd, a Dutch ship that had been chartered to bring provisions from Batavia (present day Jakarta), arrived in the colony and was to stay for several weeks while negotiations took place over a further charter. Bryant and his wife befriended the Dutch captain, Detmer Smith, and acquired from him the things they would need for their escape: a compass, quadrant, chart, rice, salt pork, flour, a barrel for water, two muskets and ammunition. The plan was to steal a boat and head for the Dutch East Indies 3,000 miles away.

The Waaksamheyd left Port Jackson on 27 March 1791, having been chartered to return to England. With no ship left in the harbour to give chase and the monsoon season fast approaching, Bryant decided to make his escape the following day when darkness fell. Along with his wife and two children, and seven other convicts (James Martin, James Cox and Samuel Bird from the First Fleet, and William Allen, Nathaniel Lilly, navigator William Morton and Samuel Broom from the Second Fleet), he boarded the governor's cutter and loaded the provisions and equipment. They made their way past South Point without being spotted by the lookout and into the open sea. It was only in the morning that the escape was discovered. There was a certain amount of sympathy and admiration for the convicts; John Easty, a private in the Marines, wrote:

Today 8 men with 1 woman and 2 Children Convicts toke a kings boat of 6 oars with a large quantity of provisions... it was Supposed that they intinded for Bativee but having no vessell in the habour thare was no Pursueing them so thay got Clear of, but it is a very Desperate attempt to go in an open Boat for a run of about 16 or 17 hundred leags and pertuclar for a woman and two Small children... but the thoughts of Liberty from Such a place as this is Enough to induce any Convicts to try all Skeemes to obtain it as they are the same as slaves all the time thay are in this country.

Bryant and his crew set out to navigate up the east coast of Australia, passing between the Great Barrier Reef and the mainland, through the Torres Strait and across the Arafura Sea to Timor. They had to make frequent landings to find food and fresh water and caulk the seams of the boat. Sometimes they were watched by Aborigines, at first just curious, but as they went further north, more hostile. The cutter had two sails, and six oars that had to be used when the wind dropped. Before they reached the more sheltered waters of the Great Barrier Reef the weather deteriorated and they survived two storms, at one time being blown out to sea without sight of land for eight days. Sailing up the Great Barrier Reef they were able to stop on uninhabited islands and replenish their food stocks with fresh turtle and shellfish. After sailing through the Torres Straits into the Gulf of Carpentaria they encountered a hostile reception from natives who on occasion pursued them in canoes.

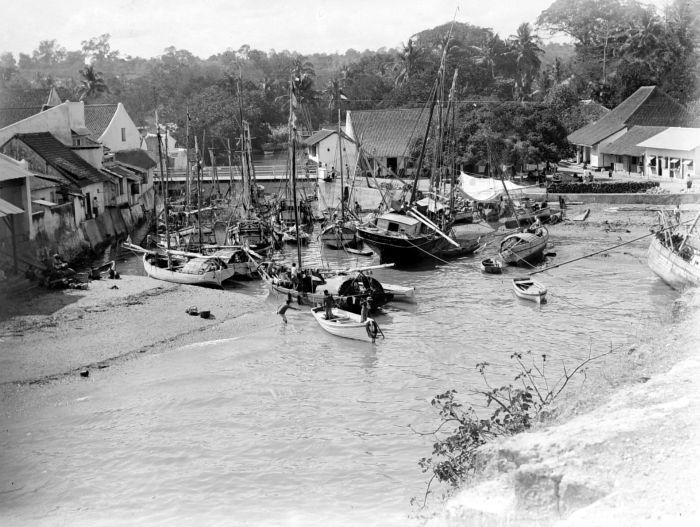
Kupang harbour

Finally, 69 days after leaving Port Jackson, having sailed 3,254 miles, they made landfall at Kupang on the island of Timor. The escaped convicts had prepared a story to explain their arrival at Kupang in a small boat. Bryant took his wife's maiden name, calling himself William Broad, and told the authorities that they were some of the survivors from a shipwreck on the Great Barrier Reef. The Dutch governor Timotheus Wanjon believed their story and provided them with accommodation, food and clothing, with Bryant signing bills that the governor could then send to the British government for reimbursement. The men found work on the quays and the next few months in the healthy climate of Kupang provided them with a respite from their privations.

== Recapture and death ==
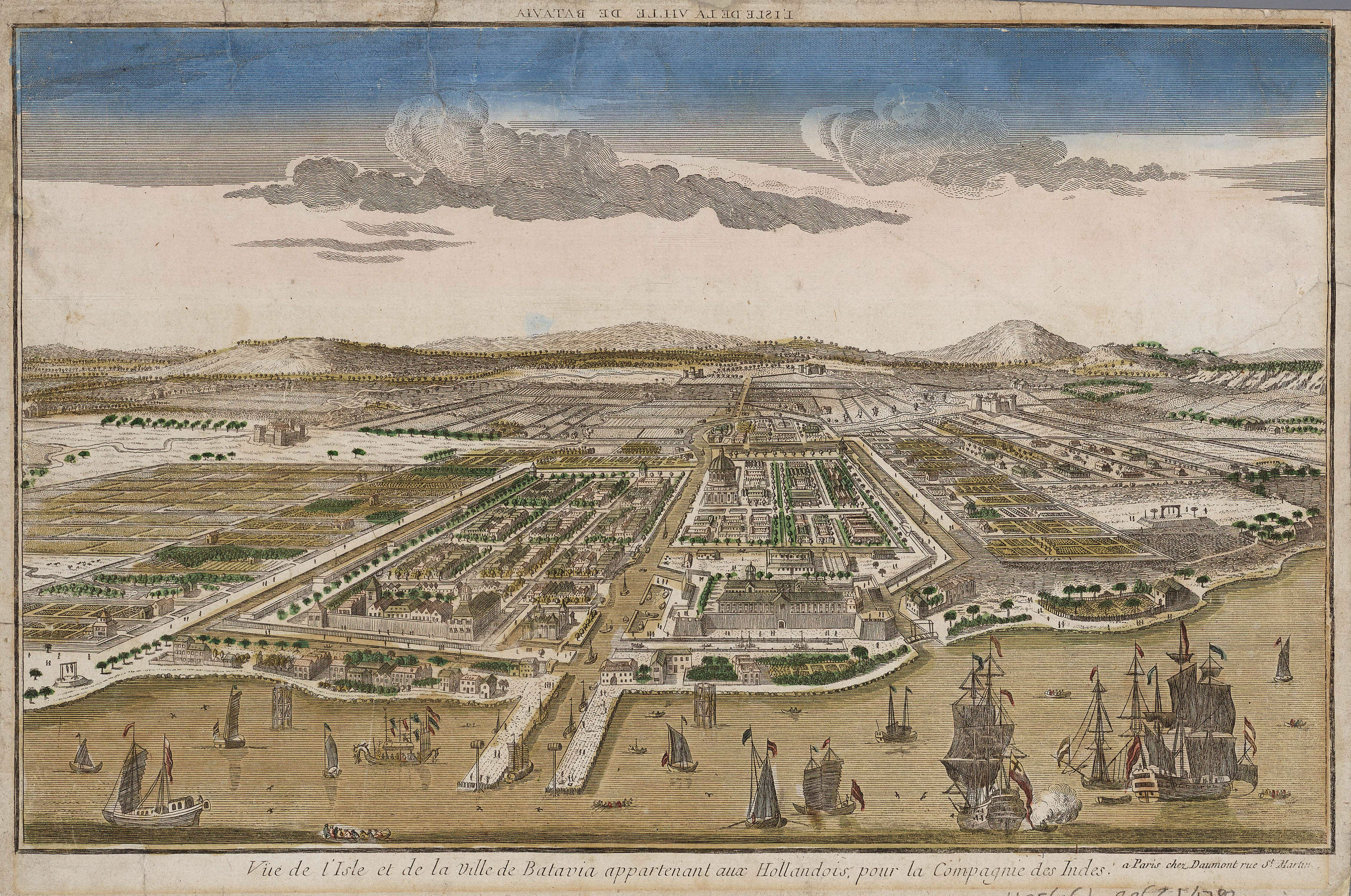
Bryant died in Batavia

On 15 September, however, another four small boats arrived in Kupang, carrying Captain Edward Edwards and the remains of the crew of HMS Pandora, sunk off the Barrier Reef, as well as ten Bounty mutineers whom he had captured and who had survived the wreck. Although accounts differ as to exactly what happened, it was around this time that the authorities became suspicious of Bryant and his party, they were discovered to be escaped convicts and imprisoned. Even in prison they were not badly treated, the men being allowed out to work two at a time. On 5 October they, all in good health, were handed over to Edwards who had chartered the Rembang to take his crew and the Bounty mutineers on to Batavia, from where he could find passages for them to the Cape of Good Hope. On the Rembang the prisoners were subjected to the harsh conditions that Edwards was notorious for and were put in chains and given only enough food to prevent starvation. The captain of the Rembang had offered to provide a cabin for Mary Bryant and the children but Edwards refused the offer. When the Rembang arrived in Batavia a month later some of the convicts, including Bryant, were already suffering from fever and were moved ashore to the Dutch East India Company Hospital. Mary Bryant was allowed to accompany her sick son and husband. Bryant's son Emmanuel died in the hospital 1 December 1791.

Bryant died in the Dutch East India Company Hospital in Batavia on 22 December 1791, three weeks after the death of his son.

== The widow ==
Bryant and his son were the first of the convicts to die, but they were soon followed by three more. William Morton the navigator and Samuel Bird died of a fever on the passage from Batavia to the Cape of Good Hope. At this time they were still under the control of Captain Edwards and were kept in irons and only allowed on deck for an hour in the evening. James Cox, possibly in a final escape bid, went overboard during this exercise time while the ship was passing through the Straits of Sunda. At the time the shore was only 2 miles away, so it is possible that Cox could have reached it, although it would have been unlikely if he had been in a weakened state and in handcuffs.

At the Cape of Good Hope Bryant's widow and her daughter Charlotte and the remaining four convicts were handed over to Commander John Parker of HMS Gorgon, who was returning from Port Jackson. On this final leg of their journey back to England they received better treatment, with Mary being given a cabin to nurse her ailing daughter. Charlotte died on 6 May 1792 and was buried at sea. Also on the Gorgon were marines and their wives and children returning from Port Jackson. The marines included Captain Watkin Tench who had known Bryant and his wife since the days when he was in charge of the marines guarding the Dunkirk prison hulk and had sailed with them on the Charlotte to Australia. Captain Tench made the following comment about Bryant's escape:

I confess that I never looked at these people without pity and astonishment. They had miscarried in a heroic struggle for liberty; after having combated every hardship and conquered every difficulty.

When Bryant's widow and the remaining four convicts finally reached London in July 1792, just over 5 years since the First Fleet had departed for Australia, they could have been expecting to face the gallows. Instead they found they had become something of celebrities; James Boswell took up their cause and they were pardoned. Mary Bryant received her pardon in May 1793 after spending nearly a year in Newgate Prison, where her conditions had been alleviated by money donated by members of the public. After spending the summer in London in lodgings provided by Boswell, she decided to return to her family in Fowey. Boswell gave her a small annuity, which was cancelled by his family after his death in 1795. At that stage Bryant's widow disappears from the records. The other four convicts were released, largely thanks to Boswell's efforts, on 2 November 1793.

== Legacy ==
Bryant's voyage from Port Jackson to Timor in a small open boat has been compared to that of William Bligh and the castaways of the Bounty. Bligh had the more experienced crew, including the sailing master of the Bounty; Bryant had the advantage of a route that included more coastal waters. "In the last analysis, it is generally conceded that each of the groups performed an amazing feat entitling them to a secure place in the annals of human endeavour", concluded C. H. Currey.

Bryant kept a log of the journey from Port Jackson to Kupang, Reminescences on a Voyage from Sydney Cove, N.S.W. to Timor. When he was taken prisoner in Kupang, the journal fell into the hands of the governor, Timotheus Wanjon, who showed it to William Bligh and one of his lieutenants on HMS Providence, George Tobin, when they were in Kupang in October 1792. Bligh, who concluded that Bryant "must have been a determined and enterprising man", made notes from the journal, and intended to have it copied, but this was only partially done. The original was lost; the Dutch National Archives could find no trace of it in response to a query in 1962 and suggested that it could have been destroyed during the occupation of Timor in 1811–17 when the British used the Kupang archives to make cartridges.

Bryant's widow Mary also left an account of the escape, dictated to James Boswell the day before she left London for Fowey. "I went to her in the forenoon and wrote two sheets of paper of her curious account of the escape from Botany Bay", wrote Boswell in his journal. These two sheets of paper have never been found. But in the 1930s a previously unknown account of the escape, James Martin's Memorandoms, was found amongst the papers of Jeremy Bentham at University College, London. It is believed to have been written when Martin was in Newgate Prison, and is the only extant journal of a First Fleet convict, and the only extant first-hand account of the Bryants' escape. The Memorandoms was published, in open-access, by UCL Press in June 2017, reproducing the original manuscripts alongside an introduction and detailed annotation.

The story of William and Mary Bryant's escape has been the subject of books, drama and films. He was portrayed by Leonard Teale in the 1963 Australian Broadcasting Commission serial, The Hungry Ones, and by Alex O'Loughlin in The Incredible Journey of Mary Bryant. O'Loughlin was nominated for the 2006 Logie Award for Most Outstanding Actor.

== Bibliography ==
- Blount, C. (ed.) 1937 Memorandoms by James Martin. Cambridge: The Rampant Lions Press
- Cook, J. 1993 To brave every danger: the epic life of Mary Bryant of Fowey, highway woman and convicted felon, her transportation and amazing escape from Botany Bay. London: Macmillan
- Causer, T. (ed.) 2017. Memorandoms by James Martin: An Astonishing Escape from Early New South Wales. London, UCL Press. Also Escape from Australia: a convict's tale, a UCL video production discussing the Memorandoms.
- Currey, C. H. 1963 The transportation, escape and pardoning of Mary Bryant (née Broad). Sydney: Angus and Robertson
- Gillen, M. 1989 The founders of Australia: a biographical dictionary of the first fleet. Sydney: Library of Australian History
- Pottle, F.A. 1938 Boswell and the girl from Botany Bay. London: William Heinemann Ltd
