= SS Agamemnon =

Many steamships have been named Agamemnon including:

- SS Agamemnon (1865), broken up in 1899
- SS Agamemnon (1914), sunk in 1940
- SS Agamemnon (1946), sunk in 1969

== See also ==
- Agamemnon (disambiguation)
