= The Girl from Botany Bay =

2004 book by Carolly Erickson

- Author: Carolly Erickson
- Genre: Non-fiction
- Published: 2004
- Publisher: Wiley

The Girl from Botany Bay by Carolly Erickson is a 2004 non-fiction biography of Mary Bryant, a Cornishwoman sent to the Botany Bay penal colony in 1786 after being convicted of highway robbery.

== Synopsis ==
Mary Bryant (nee Broad) was born in Cornwall, England in 1786. She grew up in poverty and spent her life as a highway robber who camped in the forests to avoid the law. She was arrested and sentenced to death for her crimes in 1786, but her sentence was commuted to imprisonment in a penal colony in New South Wales, Australia.

She became pregnant aboard the prison ship transporting her to Australia and gave birth to a daughter while at sea. After arriving in Botany Bay, she married William Bryant, another English convict. They struggled to support themselves through farming and eventually made an escape attempt with their two children and seven other convicts. They made it as far as Timor before being arrested and sent back to England for punishment. Her husband and children died during the journey, leaving Mary alone.

In England, she expected to be executed for her crimes but she was actually pitied by the public. King George III pardoned her, and she was reunited with her sister who had inherited a large inheritance.

== Reception ==
The book received positive reviews from critics. Janette King from the Historical Novel Society wrote that ""Most appealing of all is that it uncovers the life a female convict in the late 1780s, an extremely rare glimpse for the time. Clearly Erickson knows her subject and the period, for Broad’s story is well supported by historical records; the gaps are filled in by likely surmise and speculation in a way that’s anything but dry chronicle." A review from the Melbourne daily newspaper The Age commented that "The Girl is a story with all the hallmarks of romantic or historical fiction: sex, violence, crime, adventure, and heartbreak. But there is a catch. It is not fiction - at least not completely."
