= Rival to the Queen =

2010 novel by Carolly Erickson

- Author: Carolly Erickson
- Genre: Historical fiction
- Published: 2010
- Followed by: The Favored Queen (2011)

Rival to the Queen is a 2010 historical fiction novel by Carolly Erickson.

== Plot summary ==
The story focuses on Elizabeth I and her cousin Lettice Knollys' competition for the affections of Robert Dudley, 1st Earl of Leicester.

== Reception ==
The book received mixed reviews from critics. Some reviewers criticized the plot's historical inaccuracies, and critics were divided on the portrayal of Elizabeth.
