= Horssen (ship) =

History

Dutch East India Company
- Name: Horssen
- Owner: Chamber of Delft
- Builder: Delft shipyard
- Launched: 1784
- Out of service: 1792

General characteristics
- Tons burthen: 880 (bm)
- Length: 140 voet (ca.93 ft (28 m))
- Propulsion: Sail
- Complement: 1785: 272; 1787: 99; 1792:124
- Armament: 20 × 9&6&4-pounder guns

Horssen was an East Indiaman operated by the Delft chamber of the Dutch East India Company (Dutch: Vereenigde Oost-Indische Compagnie; VOC). She was launched in 1784 and made the voyage to the Far East in 1786. She then had sailed for several nearby ports in Asia, when she finally set out for the successful return voyage in 1791, carrying aboard the prisoner Mary Bryant to Cape Town. After arriving in Europe in 1792 she was put out of service.

== Commanders ==
Horssen was commanded by Jakobus van den Berg (1727–1819) in 1785 and 1787, and thereafter by his son-in-law Georg Philipp Gas (1760–1808), of German descent from Willauw, who was married to Bergs daughter Anna Maria van den Berg.

== Maiden voyage to East India ==
Captain van den Berg, assisted by Lieutenant Georg Philipp Gas, sailed from Goeree on 14 November 1785 with a total of 272 people aboard, probably calling at Portsmouth, and arriving at the Cape on 13 February 1786, where they stayed for 17 days up to 2 March 1786 and disembarked 31 persons. The passage to Batavia took another 89 days, and the Horssen arrived there on 30 May 1786 together with the VOC ship Schoonderloo, a ship formerly commanded by Captain van den Berg in 1782. Counting people on both of these ships, of the 408 seafarers, 93 soldiers, 16 craftsmen and 26 passengers including 24 Chinese departed from Goeree, only 339 seafarers, 59 soldiers, 10 craftsmen, and 37 passengers (incl. the 24 Chinese) had reached alive at Batavia.

Conditions in Batavia were most sickening and infectious then, mainly due to standing waters in the Gracht canals the Dutch had built there, and some crewmembers of the Horssen, having survived the voyage, died there, e.g. the soldier Johan Daniel Ramdohr from Raderorwaldt on 27 June 1786.

== Further voyages ==
On 10 July 1786 the Horssen departed from Batavia and sailed to China. On 17 January 1787, with 99 persons aboard, 4 of whom should perish on the voyage, she sailed from China to the Cape, where she had a stay from 11 May until 10 June. She arrived at Goeree in the Netherlands on 23 August 1787,still being commanded by Jakobus van den Berg. On return, evidently, some issues with the payload (porcelain) occurred, causing debts for the Delft VOC chamber.

Under the new command of George Philipp Gas, on 28 May 1788, with 237 person aboard, the Horssen traveled form Goeree to the Cape, where she arrived 12 October 1788. Departing on 17 October, she arrived in Batavia on 1 January 1789.

After roughly a year, there followed minor trips within Asia. On 14 January 1790 the Horssen sailed to Bantam, returning to Batavia on 15 February. On 20 May 1790, she was sent to Chormandel and returned to Batavia on 3 December 1790. On 14 July 1791, she was ordered to sail for Java, and returned on 3 October 1791.

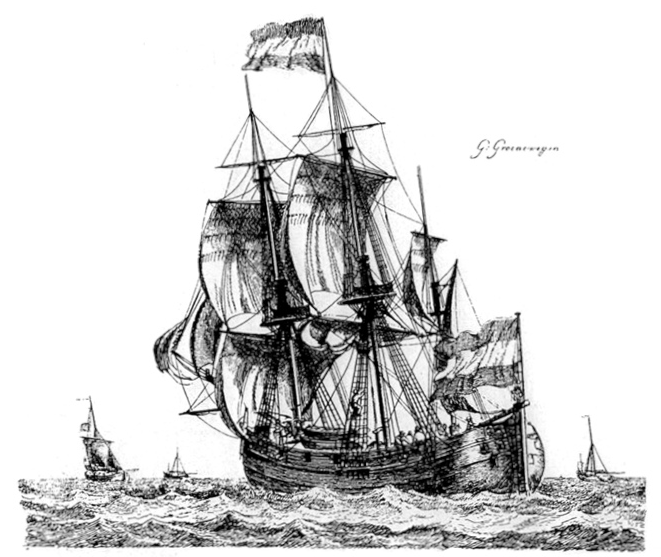
Depiction of an hoeker of 1789, similar to the ship Standvastigheid of 1785

== Return voyage with Mary Bryant ==
Captain Gas was ordered for the return voyage to Europe before 17 December 1791, when the first call for a convoy of the four retourschips Vreedenburg, Horssen, Hoornweg, and Standvastigheid (a Hoeker bought in Rotterdam in 1785) was issued. After second (19 December) and third (20 December) drum calls for assembling the crews, the ships started their voyage on 21 December for Cape Town. On board of the mentioned first three ships, the recaptured escapees of the Bryant family held in irons, as well as 10 survivors of HMS Bounty and crew members of HMS Pandora including Captain Edward Edwards, were transported as passengers. Horssen had registered 124 person on board, i. e. 105 seafarers, 7 soldiers and 12 passengers including one female and two male slaves, amongst them Mary Bryant and her daughter Charlotte. The ships arrived at Cape Town on 19 March 1792, after losing 8 seafarers. Mary Bryant, all the English persons, and others (totalling 15 people) were disembarked there.

The Horssen left the Cape on 11 April, and finally reached Goeree on 12 July 1792. Later, Captain Gas acted as the Captain of VOC ship Siam travelling from Netherlands to Dutch Bengal late 1793, returning on 18 May 1795. In 1799 he lived still as a resident in Delft.
