= Mary Bryant =

British convict (c. 1765–after 1794)

- Born: Mary Broad c. 1765; Lanlivery, Cornwall, United Kingdom
- Died: after 1794; Cornwall, United Kingdom
- Occupations: Thief, highwaywoman
- Spouse(s): William Bryant m. 1788; dec. 1791
- Children: Charlotte Spence Broad (1787–1792); Emanuel (1790–1791)
- Parent(s): William Broad; Dorothy Broad

Mary Bryant (c. 1765 – after 1794) was a Cornish convict sent to Australia in 1787 with the First Fleet. In 1791, she became one of the first successful escapees from the fledgling Australian penal colony alongside her husband William Bryant, their two children, and seven other transportees. Her group sailed for sixty-nine days by boat to Kupang on Timor, where they were detained by Dutch authorities and handed over to the British for trial in London. She was represented by the biographer and lawyer James Boswell, who was able to avoid the typical death penalty for such cases, and was sentenced to serve the remainder of her sentence in Newgate prison. She was pardoned and released in 1793 and returned to Cornwall.

== Early life ==
Bryant was born Mary Broad (referred to as Mary Braund at the Exeter Assizes) in Lanlivery, Cornwall, United Kingdom, to William Broad and Dorothy Guilleff (or Gelef/Juileff). William Broad was a farmer who also leased and coppiced woodland with his brother Matthew. In July 1785, Mary Broad was committed to prison by the Mayor of Plymouth, England, where her sister Elizabeth was living, to await trial for highway robbery. She, along with Catherine Fryer and Mary Hayden alias Shepherd, was convicted of having robbed and assaulted Agnes Lakeman on a road in Plymouth, stealing a silk bonnet valued at 12 pence, and other goods valued at £1 and 11 shillings. All three were sentenced to hang on 20 March 1786, which was commuted to seven years' transportation by the Judge. She was initially held in Exeter, before being moved to the Dunkirk prison hulk at Plymouth where she conceived her first child.

== Transportation ==
In May 1787, Bryant was sent as a prisoner with the First Fleet aboard the ship Charlotte. Bryant gave birth on the journey to a baby, whom she called Charlotte Spence Broad. When she arrived in Australia, she married William Bryant on 10 February 1788. Bryant, who had been convicted for impersonating a seaman to receive some of the other man's wages, was also on the Dunkirk prison hulk and Charlotte with Mary and they later had a son, Emanuel, born on 6 May 1790.

William Bryant was a mariner. In early New South Wales, William was considered useful, and was put in charge of fishing. When he was caught selling fish on the side, he was given 100 lashes. Bryant's transportation order expired in March 1791. He made a plan to escape with others by boat.

== Escape from the colony and recapture ==
On 28 March 1791 William and Mary Bryant, with her children, and seven transportees ~ William Allen (who had been in the navy), James Martin, Samuel Bird (alias John Simms,) Samuel Broom (alias John Butcher,) James Cox (alias Rolt,) Nathaniel Lillie, and William Morton (an experienced navigator), left the colony by boat. Onboard they carried initial provisions of food and fresh water, as well as a fishing net. They had acquired a compass, quadrant, and nautical chart, later said to have come from a Dutch sea captain of the Waaksamheyd at Port Jackson.

Initially they kept close to the coast, and stopped to replenish their supplies of water and food as they travelled north. Their planned route involved navigating the then-uncharted Great Barrier Reef and Torres Strait. After a voyage of sixty-nine days, the group reached Kupang, on the island of Timor, a journey of more than 5,000 kilometres. The voyage has often been compared with William Bligh's similar journey in an open boat only two years earlier, after the mutiny on the Bounty. Bligh's voyage had also ended in Timor.

Timor was then under the control of the Dutch. The Bryants' party claimed to be shipwreck survivors. They were later discovered and imprisoned by the Dutch governor, then handed over to Captain Edward Edwards of HMS Pandora, which had been wrecked on the Great Barrier Reef while on a mission to capture the Bounty mutineers. They were sent back to Britain to stand trial, travelling first on a Dutch ship (the Rembang) to Batavia in the company of survivors of Pandora, thereafter travelling from Batavia to Cape Town on the three Dutch East India Company ships Vredenburg, Hoornwey and Horssen (carrying Mary Bryant and her daughter Charlotte), arriving there on 19 March 1792, and later from Cape Town in the company of Royal Marines returning from Sydney on HMS Gorgon. During the voyage back, Mary lost her husband William and her children. Emanuel and William died at Batavia on 1 and 22 December 1791, whilst Charlotte died on the last leg of the voyage on 6 May 1792. Morton and Bird also died, and Cox became a man overboard from the Horssen.

Mary Bryant, Allen, Broom alias John Butcher, Lillie, and Martin arrived back in England on 18 June 1792. The punishment for escaping from transportation was generally death, but following court hearings in London, they were all ordered to 'remain on their former sentence, until they should be discharged by course of law'. Their case was taken up by the biographer and lawyer James Boswell. On 2 May 1793 Mary Bryant was pardoned, and she was released from Newgate prison, her sentence having expired, while Allen, Broom alias Butcher, Lillie, and Martin had to wait until 2 November 1793 to be released by proclamation. Bryant returned to her family in Cornwall, and Boswell provided her with £10 a year until his death in 1795.

== In popular culture ==
The Bryant party's escape was the subject of a ten-episode television serial, written by Rex Rienits, broadcast by the Australian Broadcasting Commission during 1963. Mary Bryant was portrayed by Fay Kelton.

Bryant was the subject of a British/Australian television movie The Incredible Journey of Mary Bryant, with Romola Garai playing the eponymous role, Jack Davenport and Sam Neill. It was first screened in Australia on 30 October 2005 on Network Ten as a two 2-hour part series. It was screened in the UK over Easter weekend 2006 on ITV. It was not completely historically accurate.

She also featured heavily in Timberlake Wertenbaker's play Our Country's Good, which itself was based on Thomas Keneally's novel The Playmaker. Both centre on the first Australian settlers' decision to stage a performance of The Recruiting Officer, and the action ends just at the point of Bryant's escape. In the play, she is referred to by a nickname, Dabby Bryant.

The story was fictionalised by Rosa Jordan in her novel Far From Botany Bay, by Lesley Pearse in the novel Remember Me, and by Meg Keneally in Fled.

The first chapter of the graphic novel Terra Doloris (978-2-344-00787-1, 2018) by Laurent-Frédéric Bollée and Philippe Nicloux is about Mary Bryant and her family.

The Mary Bryant story also featured in Patrick Edgeworth's play Boswell for the Defence. A huge success in London in 1989, it starred Leo McKern.

A musical titled Mary Bryant was written by Nick Enright and was presented in Melbourne by Magnormos.

Mary Bryant was the subject of a one-woman theatre show, Oh Mary!, devised and directed by Bec Applebee and Simon Harvey (Kneehigh Theatre. It toured the UK in 2011.

Paul Marsh (of the Canberra Australia group "Coolibah Coolective") composed "Sixty Six Days in an Open Boat" to tell the story of Mary and her family's journey.

== Books about Bryant ==
- Causer, Tim (2017) Memorandoms by James Martin: An Astonishing Escape from Early New South Wales . London: UCL Press ISBN 978-1-911576-82-2
- Cook, Judith (1993) To Brave Every Danger: the epic life of Mary Bryant of Fowey, highwaywoman and convicted felon, her transportation and amazing escape from Botany Bay. London: Macmillan ISBN 0-333-57438-9
- Currey, C. H. (1963) The Transportation, Escape and Pardoning of Mary Bryant (née Broad). Sydney: Angus and Robertson ISBN 978-0-909134-57-0
- Durand, John (2005) The Odyssey of Mary B: A True Tale. Elkhorn WI: Puzzlebox Press ISBN 0-9743783-1-3
- Erickson, Carolly (2005) The Girl from Botany Bay. Hoboken, NJ.: John Wiley ISBN 0-471-27140-3
- Hausman, Gerald & Loretta (2003) Escape from Botany Bay: the true story of Mary Bryant. New York: Orchard Books ISBN 0-439-40327-8
- Hughes, Robert The Fatal Shore: a history of the transportation of convicts to Australia, 1787–1868. New York: Knopf ISBN 1-86046-150-6
- Kampen, Anthony van (1968) Het leven van Mary Bryant. 3 vols. Bussum: Unieboek NV (in Dutch)
- King, Jonathan (2004) Mary Bryant: her life and escape from Botany Bay. Pymble, N.S.W.: Simon & Schuster Australia ISBN 978-0-7318-1226-4
- MacKenzie, Charlotte (2021) Mary Broad the documentary Lulu.com ISBN 978-1-716-15257-3
- Pearse, Lesley (2003) Remember Me. London: Michael Joseph (London: Penguin Books, 2004 ISBN 0-14-100649-8) (historical novel)
- Pottle, Frederick A. (1938) Boswell and the Girl from Botany Bay. London: Heinemann
- Preston, Diana (2017) Paradise in Chains: The Bounty Mutiny and the Founding of Australia. Bloomsbury Publishing ISBN 978-1-632866-12-7
- Rawson, Geoffrey (1938) The Strange Case of Mary Bryant. London: Robert Hale
- Scutt, Craig (2007) Mary Bryant: The Impossible Escape. Fitzroy, Melbourne, Australia; Black Dog Books ISBN 978-1-921167-61-4
- Veitch, Anthony Scott (1980) Spindrift, The Mary Bryant Story: a colonial saga. Australia: Angus & Robertson Publishers ISBN 0-207-14409-5
- Walker, Mike (2005) A Long Way Home. Chichester; Hoboken, NJ: John Wiley ISBN 978-0-470-09346-7

== See also ==
- List of Australian criminals
