= Agamemnon (disambiguation) =

Agamemnon may refer to:

== Mythology ==
- Agamemnon, one of the most distinguished of the heroes of Greek mythology
- Agamemnon (Zeus), an epithet of the Greek god Zeus
- Agamemnon of Cyme in Aeolia

== Theater ==
- Agamemnon (play), the first part of Aeschylus' Greek tragedy, the Oresteia
- Agamemnon (Thomson play), a 1738 play by James Thomson

== Fiction ==
- Agamemnon (Dune), a fictional character in the Legends of Dune series of books
- Agamemnon (Pantheon), a fictional character in the Marvel Comics universe
- Agamemnon Busmalis, a fictional character from the HBO television series Oz
- Agamemnon (Seneca), a Roman tragedy

== Music ==
- "Agamemnon", a song by the Violent Femmes in their album New Times
- Agamemnon (opera), an opera by Felix Werder

== Ships ==
- SS Agamemnon, an early long-distance merchant steamship with a compound engine, so achieving good fuel economy
- French ship Agamemnon, a ship of the line launched in 1812
- HMS Agamemnon, five ships of the Royal Navy
- USS Agamemnon (ID-3004), a World War I–era vessel that the US Navy used as a troop transport

== Other uses ==
- 911 Agamemnon, a Trojan asteroid
- Agamemnon, one of the GWR 3031 Class locomotives that were built for and run on the Great Western Railway between 1891 and 1915
- Agamemnon (insect), a genus of stick insects in subfamily Cladomorphinae
