= The Spanish Queen =

2013 novel by Carolly Erickson

- Author: Carolly Erickson
- Genre: Historical fiction
- Published: 2013
- Preceded by: The Unfaithful Queen (2012)

The Spanish Queen is a 2013 historical fiction novel by Carolly Erickson.

== Plot summary ==
The book focuses on Catherine of Aragon's marriage to Henry VIII, which is strained by difficulty conceiving and the repeated infant deaths of their children.

== Reception ==
The book received praise from critics for its historical accuracy and complex portrayal of Catherine, although it received some criticism for its lack of invention.
