= Jenny Wormald =

Scottish historian (1942–2015)

Jenny Wormald FRSE FRHistS HonFSA Scot
- Born: Jennifer Mary Tannahill; 18 January 1942; Glasgow, Scotland
- Died: 9 December 2015 (aged 73); Portobello, Scotland
- Spouses: A. L. Brown; Patrick Wormald
- Children: Three sons
- Awards: Fellow of the Royal Historical Society; Honorary Fellow of the Society of Antiquaries of Scotland

Academic background
- Education: University of Glasgow

Academic work
- Discipline: Historian
- Sub-discipline: Late medieval Scotland; Early modern Scotland
- Institutions: University of Glasgow; St Hilda's College, Oxford; University of Edinburgh

Jennifer Wormald (18 January 1942 – 9 December 2015) was a Scottish historian who studied late medieval and early modern Scotland.

== Life ==
Jennifer (Jenny) was born in Glasgow on 18 January 1942, and was adopted by Margaret (née Dunlop) and Dr Thomas Tannahill, a general practitioner, and was then known as Jenny Tannahill.

She was educated at Glasgow High School for Girls, and went on to study history at the University of Glasgow, where she completed her PhD. Her thesis was on the history of the late medieval Scottish nobility through analysis of a document known as a bond of manrent.

Wormald taught at the University of Glasgow between 1966 and 1985, and then St Hilda's College, University of Oxford, between 1985 and 2005. She held a variety of other posts in this time, including Fellow Librarian and Senior Tutor at St Hilda's.

Her most important research was on bloodfeud in early modern Scotland, particularly in her Past & Present article "Bloodfeud, Kindred and Government in Early Modern Scotland", which was highly influential. Wormald also produced a study of the reign of Mary, Queen of Scots.

She was most recently an Honorary Fellow in Scottish History at the University of Edinburgh. In her last years she was involved in discussions and campaigning related to the future of the Scottish Catholic Archives. Wormald was elected an Honorary Fellow of the Society of Antiquaries of Scotland on 30 November 2015.

== Personal life ==
In 1963, Jennifer Tannahill married Alfred Lawson Brown. As Brown was a devout Roman Catholic, she converted to Catholicism when they married. They had one son and later divorced. In 1980 she married the historian Patrick Wormald, and together they had two sons. They divorced in 2001.

== Death ==
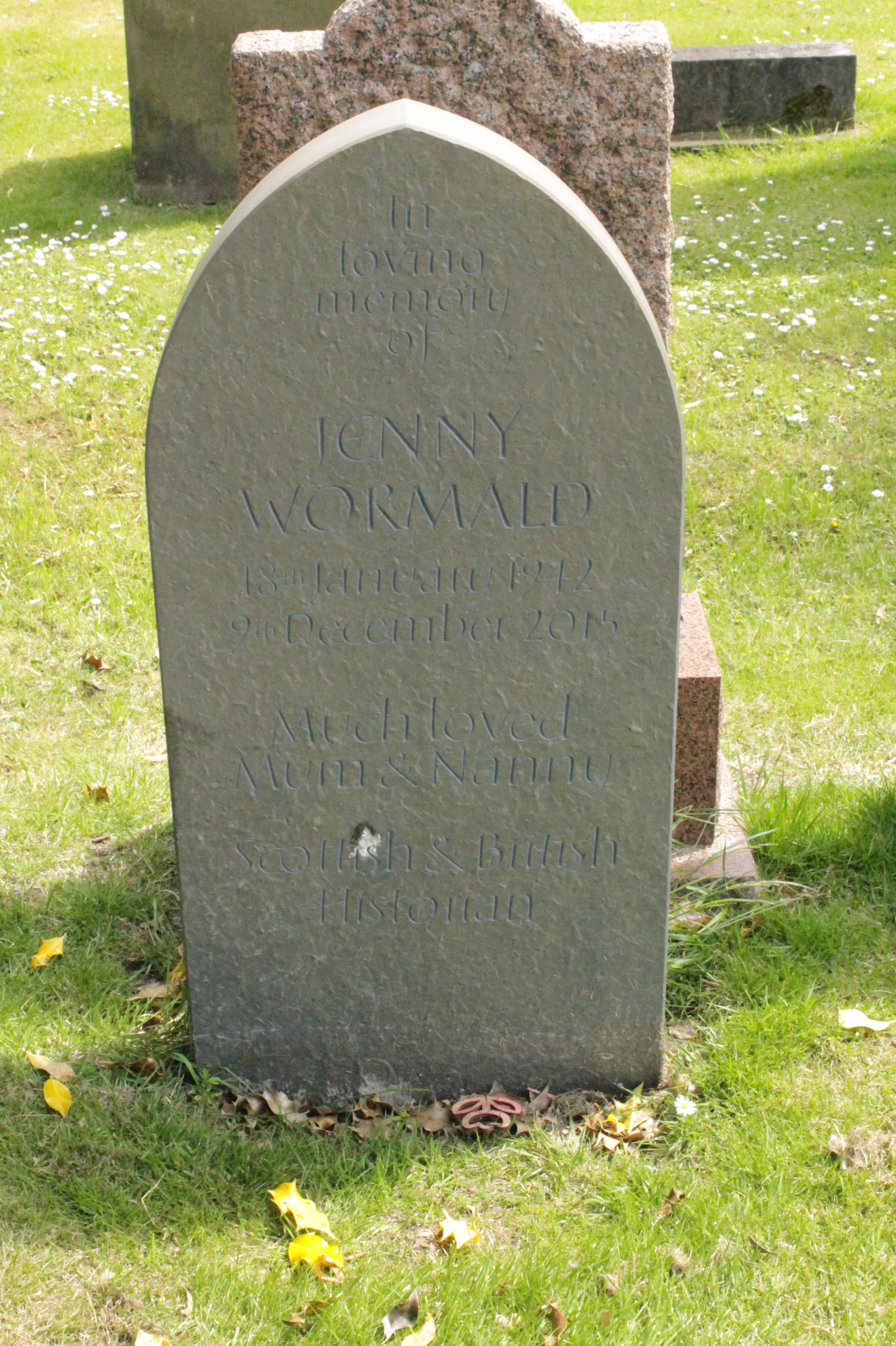
The grave of Jenny Wormald, Dean Cemetery

She died in Edinburgh on 9 December 2015. She is buried in Dean Cemetery on the south side of the main entrance path.

== Select bibliography ==
- "Bloodfeud, Kindred and Government in Early Modern Scotland", Past and Present, 87 (1980).
- Court, Kirk and Community: Scotland 1470–1625. Edward Arnold. 1981.
  - reprinted Edinburgh University Press. 1991.
- "James VI and I: Two Kings or One?", History, 68 (1983).
- "Gunpowder, Treason and Scots", Journal of British Studies, 24 (1985).
- Lords and Men in Scotland: Bonds of Manrent, 1442-1603. John Donald. 1985.
- Mary Queen of Scots: A Study in Failure. George Philip. 1988.
  - 2nd edition, as Mary Queen of Scots: Politics, Passion and a Kingdom Lost. George Philip. 2001.
- (editor) Scotland Revisited. Collins & Brown. 1991.
- (editor & contributor), The Oxford Illustrated History of Scotland. Oxford University Press. 2005.
- (edited by Miles Kerr-Peterson), James VI and I: Collected Essays by Jenny Wormald, Edinburgh: John Donald, 2021.
