= Rosalind K. Marshall =

- Born: 1939 (age 86–87); Scotland, United Kingdom
- Occupations: historian, curator

Academic background
- Education: University of Edinburgh (PhD)
- Thesis: House of Hamilton in its Anglo-Scottish setting in the seventeenth century : with a calendar of the correspondence in the Hamilton Archives at Lennoxlove, to 1712 (1970)

Academic work
- Discipline: Renaissance
- Sub-discipline: British history

Rosalind K. Marshall (born 1939) is a Scottish historian, curator, and writer working on the renaissance and early modern periods.

Rosalind Marshall gained a PhD at the University of Edinburgh in 1971 with her study of the material culture of the Dukes of Hamilton. She was an Assistant Keeper at the Scottish National Portrait Gallery in Edinburgh. She is the Honorary Historian of the Incorporation of Bonnetmakers and Dyers of Edinburgh, and Fellow of the Royal Society of Literature.

== Publications ==
Marshall's work includes studies of portraiture, costume, and jewellery, Scottish social life, women's history, analysis of the court of Mary, Queen of Scots, and biographies of Mary of Guise and other subjects.

- The Days of Duchess Anne: Life in the Household of the Duchess of Hamilton (East Linton: Tuckwell, 1973).
- Childhood in seventeenth century Scotland (Edinburgh: Trustees of the National Galleries of Scotland, 1976).
- Mary of Guise (London: Collins, 1977).
- "Hir Rob Ryall: the Costume of Mary of Guise", Costume, 12:1 (1978), pp. 1-12. doi:10.1179/cos.1978.12.1.1
- Virgins and Viragos: Women in Scotland (Collins, 1983).
- Rosalind K. Marshall & George R. Dalgleish, The Art of Jewellery in Scotland (Edinburgh: HMS0, 1991).
- "The Jewellery of James V, King of Scots", Jewellery Studies, 7 (1996).
- Queen Mary's Women: Female Relatives, Servants, Friends, and Enemies of Mary, Queen of Scots (John Donald: Edinburgh, 2006).
- Scottish Queens: 1034–1714 (Edinburgh: John Donald, 2007).
- "In Search of the Ladies-in-Waiting and Maids of Honour of Mary, Queen of Scots: A Prosoprographical Analysis of the Female Household", Nadine Akkerman & Birgit Houben (eds), The Politics of Female Households: Ladies-in-waiting across Early Modern Europe (Brill, 2014), pp. 209–230. doi:10.1163/9789004258396_010
- The Edinburgh Merchant Company, 1901-2014: A Story of Endeavour and Achievement (Edinburgh: John Donald, 2014).
