= Gosforth (ship) =

Gosforth was a timber ship, registered as 810 tons and launched in 1856 for passenger transport between England and East India. Gosforth was built by T. and W. Smith Shipbuilders, later to become Smiths Dock Company, in North Shields, England. At the time of launch, Gosforth was described as an East Indiaman, though was subsequently termed "frigate-built".

Gosforth was chartered for at least one voyage to take new settlers to Adelaide in the colony of South Australia. Gosforth departed Plymouth on 3 October 1865 captained by H.P.W. Wight and arrived in Port Adelaide on 26 December 1865 with 388 people on board. Over half of the new settlers emigrated from Cornwall.
