= The Favored Queen =

Historical fiction novel

- Author: Carolly Erickson
- Genre: Historical fiction
- Published: 2011
- Preceded by: Rival to the Queen (2010)
- Followed by: The Unfaithful Queen (2012)

The Favored Queen is a 2011 historical fiction novel by Carolly Erickson.

== Plot summary ==
The book follows Jane Seymour, maid-of-honor to Queen Catherine of Aragon. Jane witnesses Catherine's fall from grace as her husband King Henry VIII divorces her in favor of Anne Boleyn. Jane serves Queen Anne as her own romance with Henry begins.

== Reception ==
The book received mixed reviews from critics, some of whom praised it for its prose and entertaining story while others felt it was historically inaccurate and criticized the characterization of Jane.
