= The Memoirs of Mary Queen of Scots =

2009 novel by Carolly Erickson

- Author: Carolly Erickson
- Genre: Historical fiction
- Published: 2009

The Memoirs of Mary Queen of Scots is a 2009 historical fiction novel by Carolly Erickson.

== Plot summary ==
The novel is written as a fictional memoir from the perspective of Mary, Queen of Scots.

== Reception ==
The novel received positive reviews from critics, who praised its fast pace and three-dimensional portrayal of Mary.
