= Steven J. Reid =

Steven J. Reid is a historian based at the University of Glasgow where he is Professor of Early Modern Scottish History and Culture.

Reid won the Scottish History Society Rosebery Prize for palaeography in 2007. He gained a PhD in history from the University of St Andrews in 2009.

Reid was Principal Investigator (PI) for the UKRI/AHRC funded project "Bridging the Continental divide: neo-Latin and its cultural role in Jacobean Scotland, as seen in the Delitiae Poetarum Scotorum". His recent work has utilised unpublished sources for Scottish history, including the treasurer's accounts (1580–1603) and a collection of letters sent to George Bowes formerly kept at Streatlam Castle.

== Selected publications ==
- "Family, Performativity and Justice in Early Modern Scotland: Elite Display and the Death of the Fourth Earl of Atholl, 1579", The Scottish Historical Review, 105 (1), no. 267 (April 2026), pp. 1–23. doi:10.3366/shr.2026.0752
- "One King and Many: New Perspectives", Alexander Courtney and Michael Questier, James VI and I: Kingship, Government and Religion (Routledge, 2025), pp. 19–43. doi:10.4324/9781003319764-2
- 'Thomas Maitland's "the Consecration of James VI"', in, Rethinking the Renaissance and Reformation in Scotland (Boydell, 2024).
- (ed.) The Afterlife of Mary, Queen of Scots (Edinburgh University Press, 2024).
- The Early Life of James VI, A Long Apprenticeship (Edinburgh: John Donald, 2023).
- (ed.) with Miles Kerr-Peterson, James VI and Noble Power in Scotland: 1578-1603 (Routledge: Abingdon, 2017).
- (ed.) with David McOmish, Neo-Latin Literature and Literary Culture in Early Modern Scotland (Brill, 2017).
- "A Latin Renaissance in Reformation Scotland? Print Trends in Scottish Latin Literature", Scottish Historical Review, 95:240, Part I (April 2016), pp. 1–29.
- Humanism and Calvinism: Andrew Melville and the Universities of Scotland, 1560–1625 (Ashgate: Farnham, 2011).
