= Carolly Erickson =

American author (1943–2020)

- Born: January 1, 1943
- Died: 11 November 2020 (aged 77)
- Occupations: Author of historical fiction and nonfiction

Carolly Erickson (born January 1, 1943–November 11, 2020) was an American author of historical fiction and non-fiction. In 2008, her book The Tsarina's Daughter won the RT Reader's Choice Award for best Historical Fiction.

== Personal life ==
Erickson lived in California, Hawaii and Washington State. She died in Wenatchee, Washington on November 11, 2020.

== Novels ==
- The Hidden Diary of Marie Antoinette (2005)
- The Last Wife of Henry VIII (2006)
- The Secret Life of Josephine: Napoleon's Bird of Paradise (2007)
- The Tsarina's Daughter (2008)
- The Memoirs of Mary Queen of Scots (2009)
- Rival to the Queen (2010)
- The Favored Queen (2011)
- The Unfaithful Queen (2012)
- The Spanish Queen (2013)

== Non fiction ==
- The Records of Medieval Europe (1971)
- The Medieval Vision: Essays in History And Perception (1973)
- Bloody Mary: The Life of Mary Tudor (1976)
- Civilization and society in the West (1974)
- Josephine: A Life of the Empress (1990)
- Great Harry: The Extravagant Life of Henry Viii (1977)
- Royal Panoply: Brief Lives of the English Monarchs (1980) (Brief Lives of the English Monarchs (2007)
- The First Elizabeth (1977)
- Mistress Anne (1978)
- Our Tempestuous Day: A History of Regency England (1980)
- Bonnie Prince Charlie (1981)
- To the Scaffold: The Life of Marie Antoinette (1984)
- Great Catherine: The Life of Catherine the Great, Empress of Russia (1994)
- Her Little Majesty: The Life of Queen Victoria (1987)
- Arc of the Arrow: Writing Your Spiritual Autobiography (1998)
- Alexandra: The Last Tsarina (2001)
- The Girl from Botany Bay (2004)
- Lilibet: An Intimate Portrait Of Elizabeth II (2004)
