= Cultural depictions of Mary I =

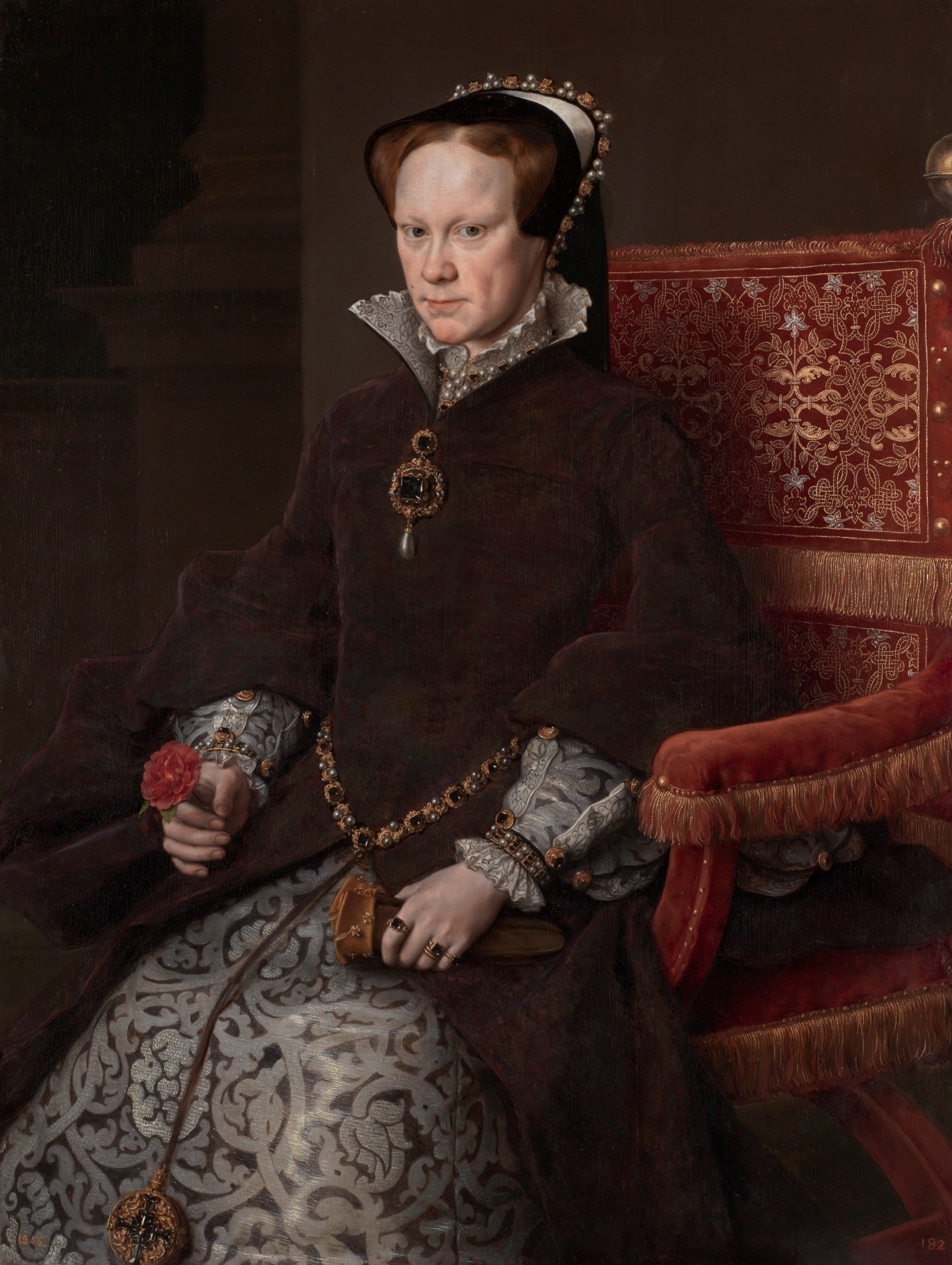

Mary I, Queen of England, has been depicted in popular culture a number of times.

== Literature ==
- Marie Tudor (1833) by Victor Hugo.
- The Tower of London (1840) by William Harrison Ainsworth.
- Queen Mary (1875) by Alfred, Lord Tennyson. A theatrical play.
- The Prince and the Pauper (1881) by Mark Twain. The novel includes a depiction of Mary before her accession as a "grimly holy Lady Mary". The short appearance had a considerable influence on her negative image, given the enduring popularity of Twain's work.
- Mary Tudor: A Play in a Prologue and Three Acts (1936) by Wilfred Grantham and its 1945 radio adaption Mary Tudor.
- Young Bess (1944), Elizabeth, Captive Princess (1948), and Elizabeth and the Prince of Spain (1953) by Margaret Irwin. A trilogy focusing on the early years of Elizabeth I and her relationship with Mary and Philip II of Spain.
- Mary, the Infamous Queen (1971) by Maureen Peters. The novel tells Mary's life through her reign.
- Daughter of Henry VIII (1971) by Rosemary Churchill. Features Mary's struggles against her father Henry VIII of England.
- The Ringed Castle (1971) by Dorothy Dunnett. Part of the Lymond Chronicles. The novel includes a sympathetic portrayal of Mary's marriage and pregnancies.
- I Am Mary Tudor (1971), Mary the Queen (1973), and Bloody Mary (1974) by Hilda Lewis. A trilogy focusing on Mary's life from the cradle to the grave. The books include a "psychological exploration of Mary's character", a sympathetic character who grows "increasingly paranoid and deluded" in her later years.
- Queen's Lady (1981) by Patricia Parkes.
- In the Shadow of the Crown (1988) by Eleanor Hibbert. A historical novel focusing on the Tudor Queens.
- In the Garden of Iden (1997) by Kage Baker. A science fiction novel, involving time travel.
- In the Time of the Poisoned Queen (1998) by Paul C. Doherty. Mary I dies of poisoning, immortal Nicholas Segalla investigates a historical mystery with many suspects.
- Elizabeth I: Red Rose of the House of Tudor (1999) by Kathryn Lasky. The novel is part of the juvenile historical-fiction series The Royal Diaries. Mary is a prominent character and is portrayed as a bitter rival to her half-sister Elizabeth.
- Mary, Bloody Mary (1999) and Beware, Princess Elizabeth (2001) by Carolyn Meyer. Both novels are part of the Young Royals series. The first depicts Mary's teenaged years, the second Elizabeth's teenaged years. Both attempt to explore their experiences at the time and how said experiences shaped their later lives.
- Kissed by Shadows (2003) by Jane Feather. Conclusion of the Kiss Trilogy, a "complex historical drama" series set in the 16th century.
- The Queen's Fool (2004) by Philippa Gregory. The novel depicts Mary's rise to power and reign in a very sympathetic light, and makes an effort to revise her long-lasting horrific image. It shows her through the eyes of a devoted and loving servant - without hiding the horror of the persecutions.
- Innocent Traitor (2007) and The Lady Elizabeth (2008) by Alison Weir. Two novels covering the adversarial relationship of Mary with Lady Jane Grey and Elizabeth I.
- The Queen's Sorrow (2008) by Suzannah Dunn. The novel attempts to show the other side to Mary, as seen through the eyes of Rafael, a member of the entourage of Philip II of Spain.
- Her Mother's Daughter (2009) by Julianne Lee is a novel about Mary's life.
- Dracula and the Bloody Mary: A Tragicomedy (early 21st century) by Santiago Sevilla. A theatrical play, published in Liceus El Portal de las Humanidades. (Liceus.com). Features Count Dracula in the courts of Edward VI and Mary I.
- Princess Mary appears in Hilary Mantel's Booker Prize-winning novels Wolf Hall (2009) and Bring Up the Bodies (2012) as well as in the final book in the series, The Mirror & the Light (2020).
- Mary is a major character in Janet Wertman's The Boy King (2020), the final instalment in Wertman's Seymour Saga trilogy.

== Film and television ==
Mary has been played on screen by:

- Jeanne Delvair in Marie Tudor (1917). Film adaptation of a Victor Hugo story.
- Gwen Ffrangcon Davies in Tudor Rose (1936), about Lady Jane Grey
- Yvette Pienne in The Pearls of the Crown (1937).
- Ann Tyrrell (uncredited) in Young Bess (1953)
- Sheila Allen in The Prince and the Pauper (1962), a three-episode television adaptation of the Mark Twain story. Broadcast as part of Walt Disney's Wonderful World of Color.
- Françoise Christophe in Marie Tudor (1966). Kathy Fraise also depicts Mary in her childhood. Film adaptation of a Victor Hugo story.
- Nicola Pagett in Anne of the Thousand Days (1969), in which she made a brief appearance in a scene showing Catherine of Aragon's death; in reality, Mary was not present at this event as she was living far away attending her half sister Princess Elizabeth
- Verina Greenlaw as a girl in the first episode ("Catherine of Aragon") of the BBC TV series The Six Wives of Henry VIII (1971)
- Alison Frazer as an older woman in the third episode ("Jane Seymour") and sixth episode ("Catherine Parr") of The Six Wives of Henry VIII (1971)
- Daphne Slater in the BBC TV series Elizabeth R (1971)
- Inge Keller in Die Liebe und die Königin (1977). Film adaptation of a Victor Hugo story.
- Jane Lapotaire in Lady Jane (1986)
- Mary MacDonald in Kings and Queens of England Volume I (1993)
- Kathy Burke in Elizabeth (1998)
- Lara Belmont in the Granada Television serial Henry VIII (2003). The role was a small one, which accorded with Anne of the Thousand Days in having Mary present at her mother's deathbed.
- Lisa Simpson (voiced by Yeardley Smith) in the 2004 Simpsons episode "Margical History Tour"; Mary as a child is blamed for her parents' divorce, because (according to Marge/Catherine), "You came out the wrong sex and ruined everything!"
- Joanne Whalley in the TV miniseries The Virgin Queen (2005)
- Bláthnaid McKeown as a young girl in the first season of the TV series The Tudors (2007) and Sarah Bolger in her teens and early twenties in the second, third and fourth seasons (2008–2010). This unusually positive portrayal of Mary and her life drew rave reviews, with Bolger garnering praise for her performance.
- Constance Stride in The Other Boleyn Girl (2008)
- Miranda French in The Twisted Tale Of Bloody Mary (2008), an independent film from TV Choice Productions
- Alice Lowe in Series 3, Sarah Hadland in Series 4, Gemma Whelan in Series 7, Ellie White in Series 8, and Emily Lloyd-Saini from Series 9 onwards of Horrible Histories
- Lily Lesser in Wolf Hall (2015). Lesser reprises the role in Wolf Hall: The Mirror and the Light (2024)
- Ángela Cremonte in Spanish historical series Carlos, rey emperador (2015–2016) about Charles V, Holy Roman Emperor
- Daisy Ashford in the Channel 5 docudrama series Elizabeth I (2017).
- Billie Gadsdon in The Spanish Princess (2019–2020)
- Rachel Lascar in the "Bloody Mary Hour" (2020) episode of El ministerio del tiempo.
- Aoife Hinds in Anne Boleyn (2021)
- Romola Garai in Becoming Elizabeth (2022), a drama series, premiered on Starz, that follows the younger years of Queen Elizabeth I.
- Patsy Ferran in Firebrand (2023)
- Kate O'Flynn in romantic-fantasy miniseries My Lady Jane (2024)

== Plays ==
- Queen Mary appears as a main character in Rosamund Gravelle's debut play Three Queens, and first played by Becky Black. Set in 1554 the play is about a fictional encounter between Queen Mary I of England, Lady Jane Grey, and Princess Elizabeth Tudor, brought together by their cousin, Cardinal Reginald Pole, the night before Lady Jane Grey is due to be executed.

== Audio ==
- Queen Mary appears in the Doctor Who audio play The Marian Conspiracy, set in 1554, played by Anah Ruddin. The story focuses on the religious tensions of her reign and involves an attempt to assassinate the queen by English Protestants and French Catholics.

== Video games ==
- Bloody Mary appears as the boss in the Sylvain Castle stage in Terranigma.
- Bloody Mary appears in the 1993 PC action game, Rusty.
