= Mary Nicolay =

British Australian Nightingale nurse (1850–1939)

Mary Ann Nicolay
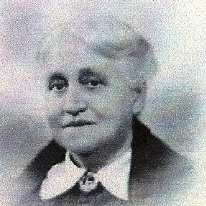
- Born: 2 August 1850; Chelsea
- Died: 15 October 1939 (aged 89)
- Occupation: matron

Mary Ann Nicolay (2 August 1850 – 15 October 1939) was a British Australian Nightingale nurse and hospital matron primarily in the Australian city of Perth.

== Early life and education ==
Nicolay was probably born in the London area of Chelsea. Her parents were Mary Ann (born Raven) and the Reverend Charles Grenfell Nicolay. They had eight children, and she was their fifth. Her father was the librarian of King's College Hospital from 1843 to 1858 and he was a co-founder of Queen's College, London which was able to teach women from 1853. Mary was educated in Bristol at the Clifton High School, where she became a pupil teacher.

=== Education under Florence Nightingale ===
She undertook training as a nurse under Florence Nightingale at the Nightingale School of Nursing in London in March 1876. She trained for a year and in March 1877 she joined the National Nursing Association. In the following year her mother gathered the family together to go to Australia to be reunited with the Reverend Nicolay. She did not stay long, and she went back to the UK. She did not return to Australia until 1888 when she looked after her father.

== Career ==
In 1890 she became the matron of Perth Colonial Hospital, and she worked there for a year. She then undertook private nursing, charging high fees, but not getting very rich. Her father wrote, and he founded the Western Australian Museum and he left her his money, when he died in 1897, and she had a small hospital in Perth.

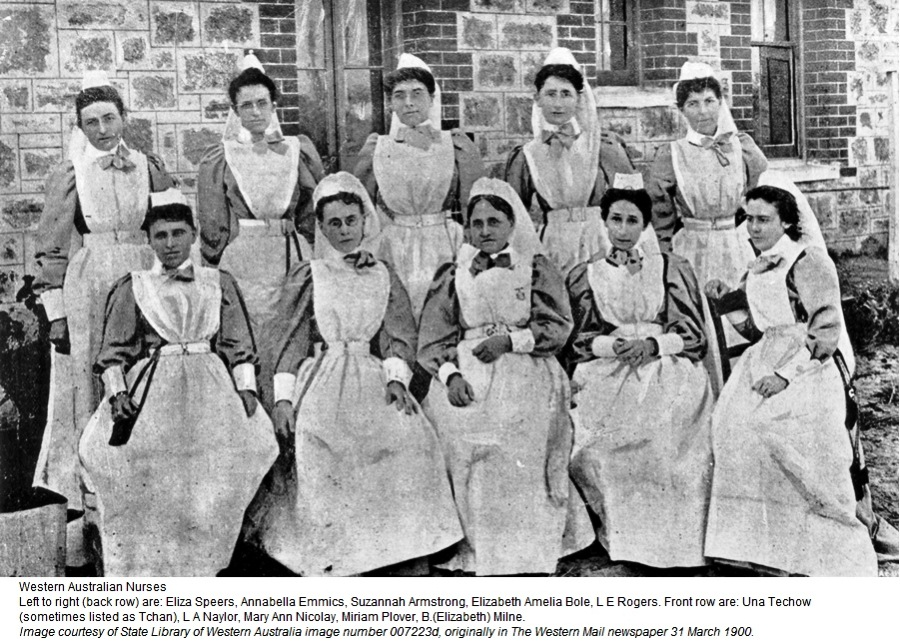
WA Nurses in 1900. Matron Mary Nicolay is at front in the centre.

She went as a matron to the Boer War in March 1900 on board the Salamis. She asked each of the nurses to take an oath of obedience. This was not an official contingent, but a group paid for by fundraising. She soon returned. She left again in 1901 according to one source, but another sees her based in Perth until 1917. She was known for her rules, and she frequently mention her mentor Florence Nightingale to her charges. She returned in 1919 to the hospital to help with the flu pandemic.

== Legacy ==
In the 1930s she was sketched in charcoal by Beatrice Darbyshire. The portrait is in the Art Gallery of NSW.
