= The Stranger Prince =

1937 novel

- First edition image
- Author: Margaret Irwin
- Language: English
- Genre: Historical
- Publisher: Chatto & Windus
- Publication date: 1937
- Publication place: United Kingdom
- Media type: Print

The Stranger Prince is a 1937 historical novel by the British writer Margaret Irwin. It is based on the life of Prince Rupert of the Rhine, the cavalry commander of his uncle Charles I during the English Civil War. It was a popular work in its era and remained influential for is portrayal of the Cavaliers during the era.

== Bibliography ==
- Hutton, Ronald. Debates in Stuart History. Macmillan, 2004.
