= Royal Flush (novel) =

1932 novel

- First edition (UK)
- Author: Margaret Irwin
- Language: English
- Genre: Historical
- Publisher: Chatto & Windus (UK); Harcourt Brace (US)
- Publication date: 1932
- Publication place: United Kingdom
- Media type: Print

Royal Flush is a 1932 British historical novel by the British writer Margaret Irwin. It portrays the married life of Henrietta Stuart, known as Minette, who married into the French royal family in the mid-seventeenth century. In particular it focuses on her careful diplomatic relationship with her brother Charles II, climaxing in the Treaty of Dover.

== Bibliography ==
- Kirkpatrick, D. L. Twentieth-century Romance and Gothic Writers. Gale Research, 1982.
