= Clifton High School, Bristol =

Clifton High School
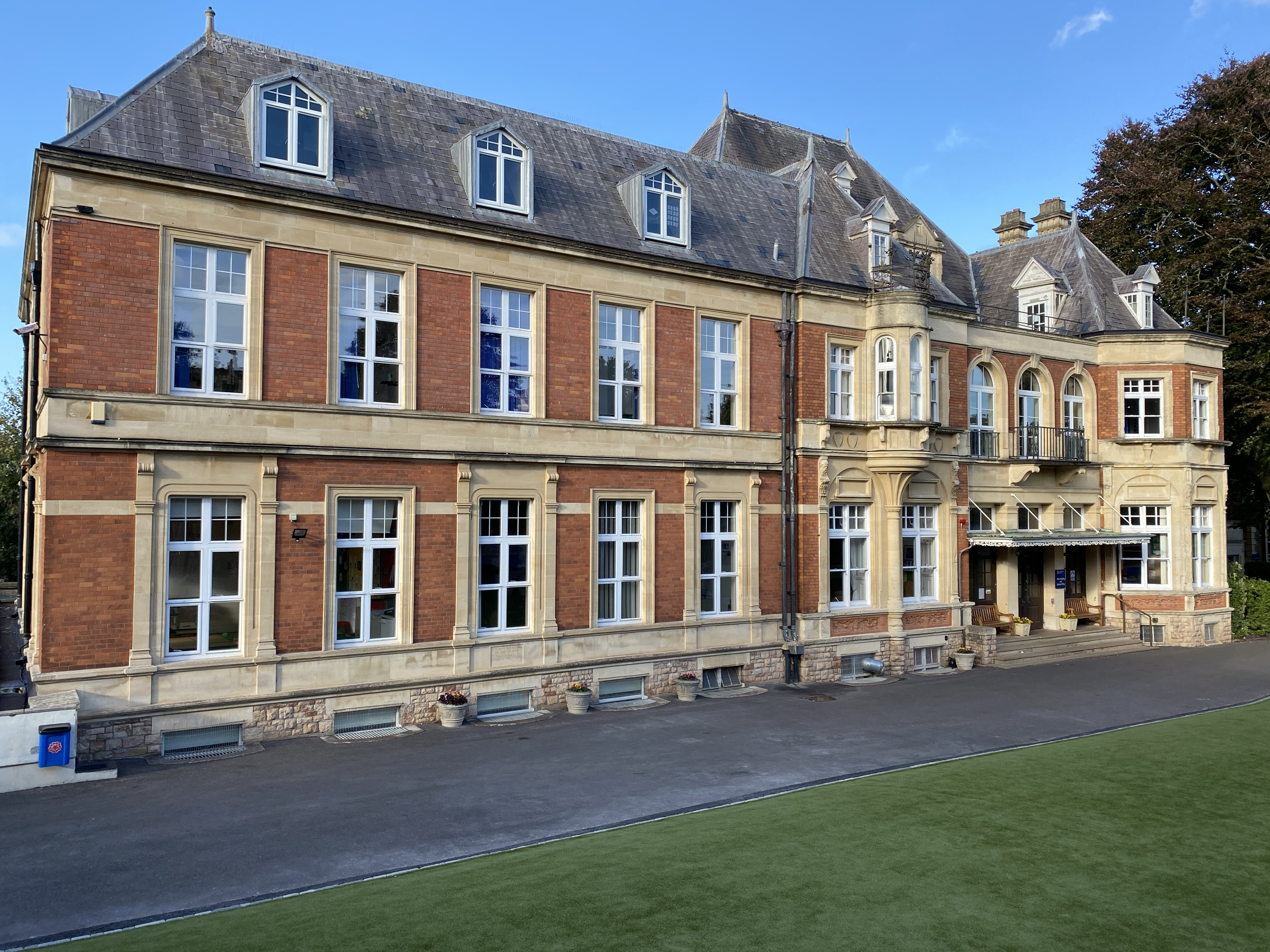
- Clifton High School Main Building, 2022

Location
- College Road; Clifton, Bristol, BS8 3JD; England; 51.45868°N 2.61967°W

Information
- Type: Private day
- Motto: Beyond a school, a place to belong (2023-); Realising Individual Brilliance (2009–); Dulcis est rosa, sed crescit in Briar (1896–2009); 'What tho, the Rose has prickled' (1877–1896)
- Religious affiliation: Church of England
- Established: September 12, 1877; 149 years ago
- Founders: John Percival (bishop) Catherine Winkworth Arnold Pears, George Wollaston, Sarah Constance Wollaston
- Department for Education URN: 109335 Tables
- Chair of Governors: James Caddy
- Head: Will Phelan
- Gender: Mixed
- Age: 1 to 18
- Enrolment: 887
- Capacity: 900
- Houses: 4; Pears, Percival, Winkworth, Wollaston
- Colours: Green, Red
- Song: The Rose Song (disused)
- Publication: The Rambling Rose (In-School newspaper) The Rosarian (Alumni Newspaper)
- Website: cliftonhigh.co.uk

Clifton High School is a co-educational private school in Clifton, Bristol, England. Clifton High School was founded as an all-girls' school in 1877 for girls aged 7–17, and the nearby Clifton College was then a boys' school. In 1887, a preparatory class was set up where boys were soon admitted. It became fully coeducational in 2009. It is a member of the Society of Heads.

== History ==
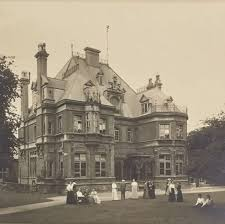
The main building in 1907

Clifton High School for Girls was founded in 12 September 1877 (after some opposition from nearby Bristol Grammar School) by visionaries including John Percival (bishop), the first Headmaster of Clifton College. In 1876, LT-Col. Pears discussed the possibility of founding a day school for girls in Clifton with Dr Percival, Mr Wollaston and others interested in starting an education. Dr Percival asked some of the most prominent Bristol Men, including George Alfred Wills. The first council was started on 12 September 1877. The school officially opened its doors on 24 January 1878 with 67 students. The first student at the school was Bessie Percival, the daughter of the founder John Percival (bishop). The first head was Ms Mary Alice Woods who was head in 1877–1891. In 1887, a preparatory class was set up where boys were soon admitted.

Clifton High originally opened in 1878 at 65 Pembroke Road. Around this time Clifton was at the height of its expansion with the Victoria Rooms, RWA, Christchurch and Whiteladies Road all recently constructed. Within a year of opening, the school needed to expand and as such, on 23 January 1879, moved into a large house that had been built in 1876, on College Road. The house is now part of the school's main building. In the sixty years following its move significant expansion took place, the original hall was built in 1889 and a new wing added to the original house in 1927 by Sir George Oatley. The wing was funded by a performance performed by students entitled 'Chaucer's England' in 1926. In the mid–1930s the tunnel under the road and gymnasium were constructed. During this time the school also expanded into the houses on School Green and into properties on Clifton Park. By 1951, the school site was largely as it is today.

Boys first joined the Junior School in 1994, and the Sixth Form began accepting boys in 2008. The school became fully coeducational the following year.

The school is the only one in the region to operate the Diamond Edge model of education. This model means boys and girls are educated together from Nursery to Year 6, then separately in some subjects between Years 7 and 9. In Years 7 to 9 boys and girls are taught separately for English, Mathematics, Biology, Chemistry, Physics and Games. They are then taught together in all subjects from Years 10 to 13. The Diamond Edge Model was applied in 2009, and is currently directed by deputy head, Manolis Psarros.

During the summer break of 2022, Clifton High School revamped some of its facilities and began construction of a new building for the Sixth Form. The same year, it was announced the school would be rebranding. The logo and possibly the uniform would be changed, and the school colours would be condensed into two colours—green and red. The school rebranding was made effective in September 2023, and introduced a new logo, tagline, and uniforms.

Following Head of School Mr Matthew Bennett's sudden departure in August 2023, Mr Luke Goodman was promoted from his position of Deputy Head to the Acting Head. Mr Will Phelan assumed the role of Head of School in September 2024.

Clifton High School has consistently been praised by external inspection agencies. A 2023 report by the Independent Schools Inspectorate found the school "Excellent" in both assessed categories (Academic and Other Achievements, Pupils' Personal Development); Ofsted has classified the school as "Outstanding" in all its judged criteria.

== Rose Day ==
Clifton High School holds its annual Rose Day at the end of the school year in mid June. It is held to commemorate the school's history and is a celebration of its achievements.

One of the school's oldest traditions, Rose Day was established by Clifton High's first head teacher, Miss Woods, in the 1880s. The Rose was officially chosen by Ms Woods in 1891. In 1945, Rose Day was moved from the nearby Clifton Cathedral to Bristol Cathedral.

== Facilities ==
The Great Hall was opened in 1889 and boarding facilities were made in 1896 until the 1990s. A school orchestra was formed in 1893. Current school facilities include a sports centre, swimming pool (opened in 1967), multimedia language centre, cooking room and several information technology rooms. The Rose Theatre was opened in 1967 along with the music and art department buildings, which then housed the sewing house and junior boarding house.

The school co-owns the Coombe Dingle Sports Complex, in partnership with the University of Bristol, which has facilities including lacrosse, rugby and football pitches, and indoor and outdoor tennis courts. In 2022, Clifton High revamped a large number of facilities, including the dining hall and arts department. Construction of a new Sixth Form Centre finished in March 2023, and was named after former headmistress, Joyce Walters. The school also opened the Walters Bistro, a café serving students and teachers in the Sixth Form Centre.

== Head teachers ==
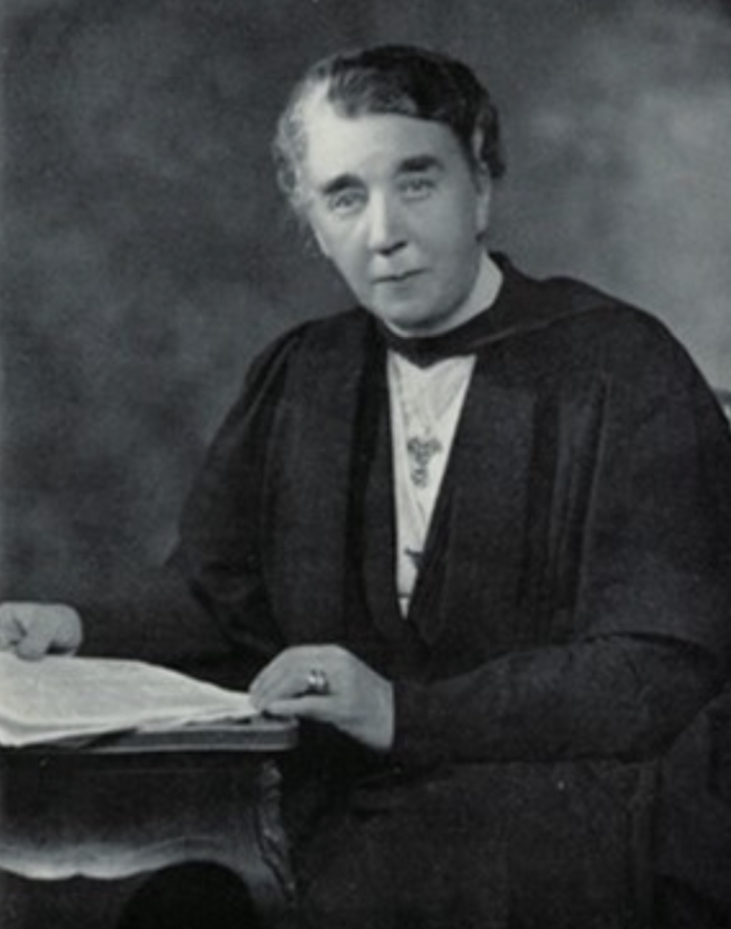
Eleanor Addison Phillips, headmistress from 1908 to 1933, was an influential figure in the Soroptimist movement

The Heads of Clifton High School, in list by chronological order:

- (1877–1891) Ms Mary Alice Woods
- (1891–1908) Ms Catherine Burns
- (1908–1933) Ms Eleanor Addison Phillips
- (1933–1962) Ms D. Nonita Glenday
- (1962–1964) Ms Sybil McKillop
- (1965–1985) Ms Pamela Stringer
- (1985–1996) Ms Joyce Walters
- (1996–1998) Mrs Yvonne Graham
- (1998–2008) Ms Colette Cullingam
- (2008–2020) Dr Alison Neill
- (2020–2023) Mr Matthew Bennett
- (2023-2024) Mr Luke Goodman
- (2024-) Mr Will Phelan

== Notable staff ==
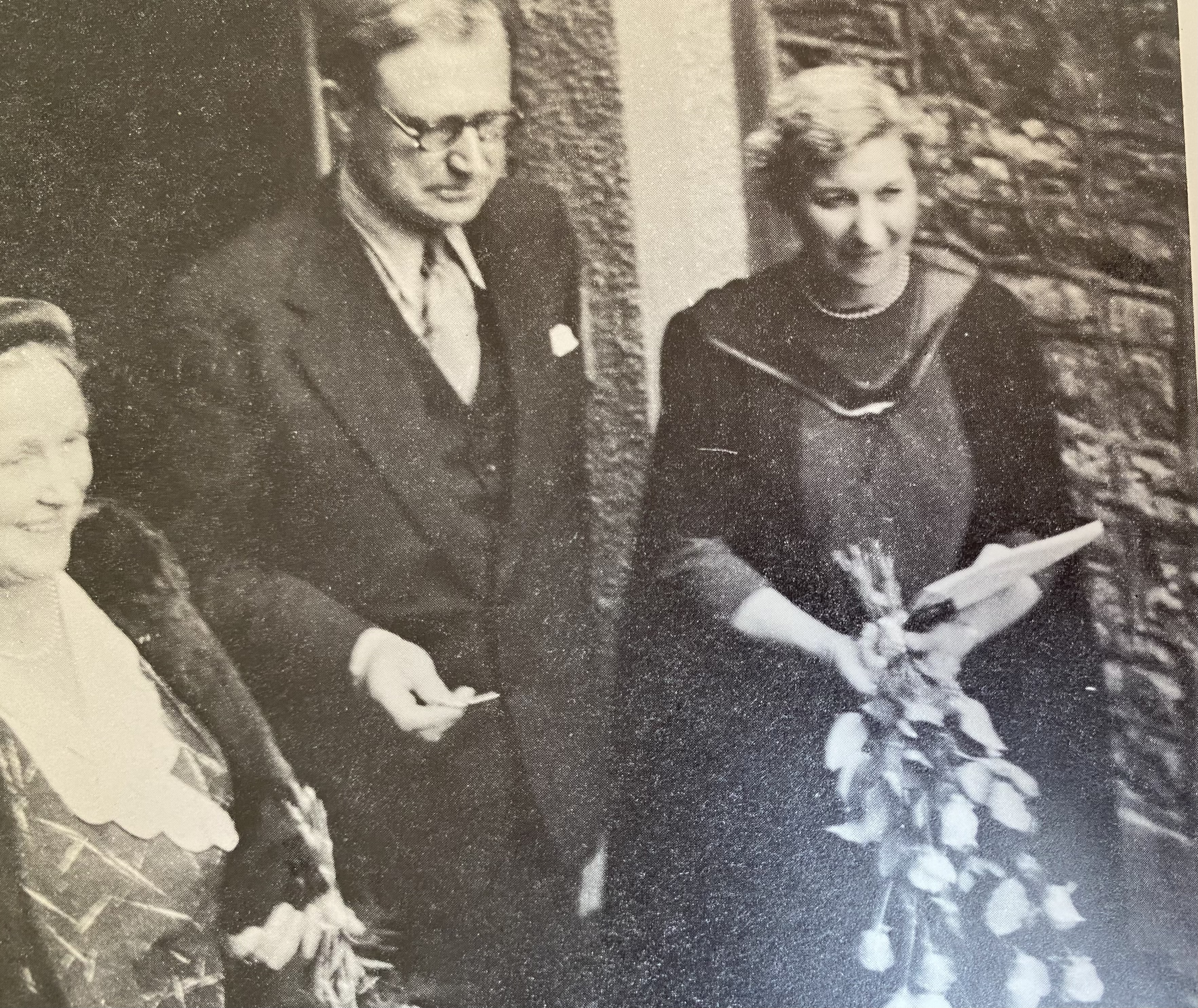
Ms Glenday, Nevill Mott (Head of Physics) and Lady Inskip at the opening of the Clifton High Physics Laboratories, 1955

- Mary Nicolay, British Australian Nightingale nurse, teacher from circa 1880-1888
- John Farmer, Composer, Head of Music, 1893-1897
- Ivey Dickson, pianist, late 1940s
- Nevill Francis Mott, Nobel Prize Laureate, Head of Physics, 1947-1955
- Shane Cloete, Former Zimbabwe Cricketer, Director of Sport, 2023-

== Notable former pupils ==
- Violet Alford, dancer
- Caroline Bammel, religious historian
- Jo Durie, professional tennis player
- Catharine Edwards, ancient historian and academic
- Ruth Edwards, Conservative MP
- Elizabeth Filkin, British public functionary
- Agnes Bessie Grace, daughter of W. G. Grace
- Elinor Goldschmied, English educationalist
- Benita Hume, actress
- Margaret Irwin, novelist
- Glynis Johns, actress
- Melanie Johnson, Labour MP
- Mary Lobel, historian
- Dame Eileen Mayo, artist and designer
- Mary Nicolay, British Australian Nightingale nurse
- Helen Porter, biologist
- Mary Renault, writer
- Ida Roper, naturalist
- Jane Shepherdson, businesswoman
- Hilary Spurling, writer
- Kate Shortman, Olympic artistic swimmer
- Isabelle Thorpe, Olympic artistic swimmer
- Helen Vanderplank, biologist
- Mona Wilson, British author and public servant

== Archives ==
Much of the school's information is found in its archives and history books. The school archives can only be accessed by teachers and students with special requests, such as writing about school history. Information can also be found at Bristol Archives.

== Gallery ==
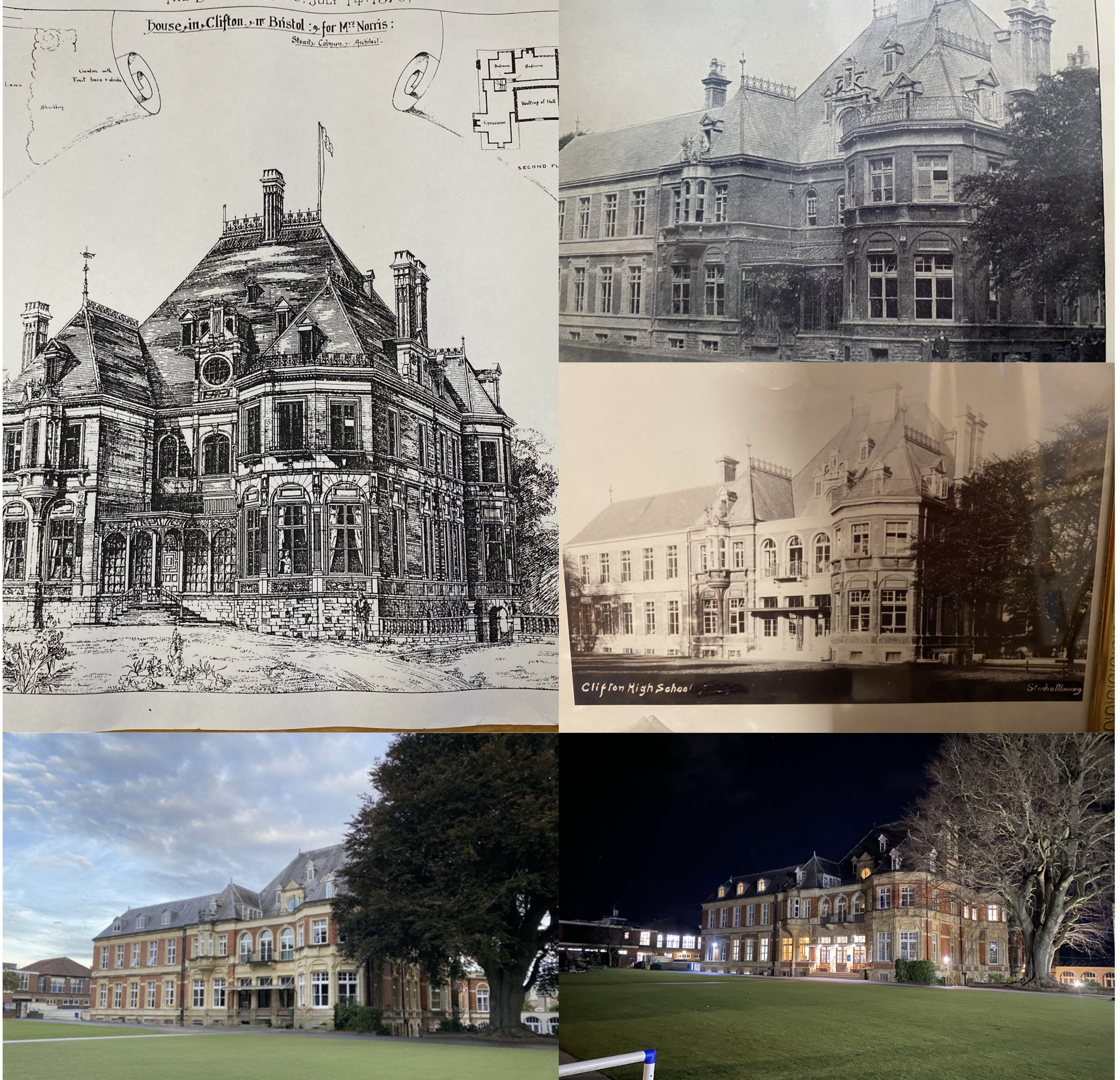
Clifton High School Main Building 1877-2023
