= Helen Vanderplank =

South African biologist

Helen Joyce Vanderplank (1919-2005) was a British-born South African biologist, botanical artist and museum curator.

== Biography ==
Vanderplank was born on 28 July 1919 in Cheltenham, Gloucestershire, She attended the Clifton High School for Girls in Bristol and graduated from Birkbeck College in London with a BSc Honours in botany and zoology. Vanderplank emigrated to South Africa and taught at Bishop's and St. Cyprian's School in Cape Town before taking up a post as a lecturer at the Grahamstown Teachers Training College, until it closed in 1975. Art was always her favourite hobby and she was appointed as the display artist at the Albany Museum, Grahamstown, a position she held until her retirement in 1984.

During her years with the Albany Museum "she transformed gallery after gallery using her artistic talents in the widest possible way". That included the Children's Gallery and the Invertebrates Gallery where her dioramas were "windows into woodland scenes of flowers, mosses and a variety of insects" and "the most stunning works of art". Her realistic flowers, leaves and insects were all made from silk, a technique she was taught by an expert at the Cardiff Museum, and even 30 years later "the scenes are as fresh as when she first made them."

When the former home and business premises of Henry Carter Galpin, the father of South African botanist Ernest Edward Galpin, was bought by Harry Oppenheimer's De Beers Consolidated Mines and converted into the Observatory Museum in 1982, Vanderplank put together all the collections of butterflies, plant presses and natural history books displayed there. She also created a "faithfully water-coloured" wall-paper of Oxalis prints for the museum, and a Victorian posy of Eastern Cape flowers under a glass dome from silk, wax and wire as a special gift for Harry Oppenheimer.

After her retirement, Vanderplank moved to Port Elizabeth where she collaborated with her good friend CJ Skead on a number of projects which led to her producing her two-volume opus Wildflowers in the Port Elizabeth area. Together the two books comprise more than 1000 illustrations covering at least 900 different plant species. She died on 7 February 2005.

== Publications ==
- Wild Flowers of the Port Elizabeth Area: Swartkops to Sundays Rivers. 1998.
- Wildflowers of the Port Elizabeth Area: Gamtoos to Swartkops Rivers (the Coastal Bush and Fynbos Region). Bluecliff. 1999. ISBN 9780620239424.
