= Elda Mazzocchi Scarzella =

Italian educationist and social worker

- Born: Elda Mazzocchi; 14 December 1904; Milan, Italy
- Died: 6 May 2005 (aged 100); Milan
- Occupation: Social worker
- Known for: Establishing the Villaggio della Madre e del Fanciullo, a refuge for single mothers
- Notable work: Two autobiographies, published in 1985 and 1998
- Spouse: Enzo Scarzella
- Children: Isabella and Alberto
- Relatives: Dino Risi, cousin

Elda Mazzocchi Scarzella (1904–2005) was an Italian educationalist, social worker and philanthropist, who founded the Villaggio della Madre e del Fanciullo (Village of the Mother and Child) for single mothers in Milan and is also remembered for her work with children in Sardinia.

== Early life and Sardinia ==
Elda Mazzocchi was born in Milan into an upper-middle class family, on 14 December 1904. She was daughter of Cesare Mazzocchi, an architect and Isabella Bossi, an elementary school teacher. Her grandfather designed the Cimitero Maggiore di Milano, Milan's largest cemetery. One of her cousins was Dino Risi, a film director. She studied in schools in Milan but was mainly educated at home, studying French and German. In 1921, Mazzocchi married Enzo Scarzella, a mining engineer, and in 1922, at the age of 18, she moved to Domusnovas in Sardinia, where her husband's family administered an estate. This was a poor area; a world that she had not previously experienced. Just after her arrival, a father murdered his daughter who had become pregnant, with little negative reaction in the village. Infant mortality among the children of the miners of the area was high and Mazzocchi responded by starting a kindergarten in 1922, following this by opening a nursery school a year later, and a canteen for mothers and children. She returned to Milan in 1923 to give birth to her daughter, Isabella, named after her mother, and then returned to Sardinia.

Mazzocchi introduced the nursery school teacher to the educational ideas of Giuseppina Pizzigoni. This method paid particular attention to the use of materials offered by nature and to the promotion of agricultural activity. It aimed for children to stay outdoors as much as possible. At the beginning of the thirties the kindergarten still did not have an adequate location, because the municipality could not afford the construction of a purpose-built school. Mazzocchi asked for donations from wealthy friends and organized several charity events until it became possible to build the new asylum, which was inaugurated on 2 July 1933. However, this coincided with her departure from Sardinia after her husband concluded that he only needed to visit Sardinia a couple of times a year.

== Return to Milan ==
Mazzocchi returned to Milan in 1933. During World War II, working with the Union of Italian Women, she gave help to the families of political deportees and men who had disappeared to escape arrest, as well as giving clandestine assistance to the Jews in Milan. After the liberation of the city on 25 April 1945, she helped needy families and refugees. Milan became the centre of assistance for thousands of refugees returning from concentration camps in Germany and Poland. She worked day and night for ten days at Milan’s railway station, and on 15 May 1945 the National Liberation Committee in Northern Italy officially entrusted her with assisting all returnees arriving in Milan. This included organizing volunteers, including her husband and son, to receive the refugees and to give first aid and other support. Among the many cases that she had to deal with were those of single mothers arriving from Germany who could not return to their families with a child, but did not want their children to go into orphanages.

== Village of the Mother and Child ==
Mazzocchi collaborated with the entrepreneur and lay missionary, Marcello Candia, to erect six prefabricated buildings in the garden of Palazzo Sormani in Milan to accommodate single mothers and pregnant returnees. This was called the “Village of the Mother and Child” and was inaugurated on 12 October 1945. On the same day the chapel of the palace witnessed the marriage of one of the returning mothers, who married a young sailor who was the father of her child. The baby was baptised on the same day. Required to leave Palazzo Sormani, where a new municipal library was to be built, in 1957 the Village moved to entirely new premises in Via Goya in the San Siro area of Milan. It was designed by Alberto Scarzella, Mazzochi's second child.

Since its foundation in 1945, the Village has had various financial problems, always managing to survive thanks to many benefactors, including, in 1985, the pop singer Fiordaliso, who mobilized the attention of the media with a press conference in which she told her story of life as a single mother and her experience as a guest at the "Village". She also issued a new record and donated all the proceeds to the Village. Compared to other welfare institutions of the time, there were no pre-established conditions for acceptance and mothers in need of assistance were welcomed, without distinction between legitimate mothers and illegitimate mothers. There were no set times for activities, to allow the mothers to breastfeed in peace. In some cases, the Village was also able to accommodate orphans. It has become a model for best practices in the care and education of single mothers and continues to be studied. Over the years, additional facilities were added, including a craft school, open to outsiders, in the 1960s and a clinic offering gynecological, pediatric, psychological and health care in general in 1975.

== Other activities ==
In 1946, Mazzocchi began visiting young people in Milan's San Vittore Prison. The condition in which she found them living led her to ask benefactors, including her friend Luigi Majno and his family, for help to create an organization aimed at supporting minors subjected to non-custodial measures, who required different treatment from that applied to their family members. The proposal was to create an auxiliary body of the Juvenile Court to assist these children. The following year, at the Village, she organized practical-theoretical internships for social workers and judicial assistants.

In 1951 she started a medical-social activity at the Niguarda Hospital in Milan and, immediately afterwards, she opened a modelling laboratory for children and a recreational club for foster children. At the request of the Provincial Childhood Institute of Trieste, in 1953 she organized, in collaboration with the British educator and pedagogue Elinor Goldschmied, the first play activity in an institution that housed children without their mothers being present; she repeated the same initiative in the pediatric wards of the Mombello Psychiatric Hospital, where she became a director, and Niguarda hospital, carrying out an initial social survey of the families of the hospitalized children.

Mazzocchi represented Milan on the Council of the Cesare Beccaria National Association, named after the 18th-century Italian criminologist. She was a committee member of the Council of Italian women, served on the Italian Social Service Committee and was a member of the Milan Section of the International League for Human Rights.

== Travel ==
In the 1950s Mazzocchi began to travel. As a guest of the British Council she went to London to take part in a course for probation officers. In 1951 she went to Washington, D.C., at the invitation of the State Department to study juvenile delinquents and young mothers in ten US states. In 1959 she went to Denmark to examine the coordination of social services between the various responsible agencies.

== Publications ==
Mazzochi's publications were:

- In 1950, Mazzocchi published an essay entitled Pedagogia sociale applicata: Lezioni del corso di didattica, gennaio-maggio 1950 (Applied social pedagogy: Lessons of the teaching course, January–May 1950). Arlo Marzorati Editore.
- In 1975, she published a monograph entitled Lasciatemi giocare (Let me play). Rizzoli Grafica.
- In 1985, she published her first autobiography A Milano dal 25 aprile 1945 liberazione. Dall'arrivo dei primi reduci al Villaggio della Madre e del Fanciullo (in Milan from the 25 April 1945 liberation. From the arrival of the first veterans to the Village of the Mother and the Child). Giessea Edizioni.
- In 1998, at the age of 94, she published another autobiography entitled Percorso d’Amore (Path of Love). Giunti Editore.

== Awards ==
Elda Mazzocchi was awarded the Civic Gold Medal of Milan in 1945. At the time, the mayor, the lawyer Antonio Greppi (first mayor of the Lombard capital after the liberation from the German occupation), allowed the first Village to use the gardens of Palazzo Dugnani. In 1963 she received the Lane Bryant International Volunteers Award and in 1967 a Gold Medal from the Province of Milan. In 1998 she was awarded the Premio Alghero Donna (Alghero Women's Prize) for her autobiography. When she went to Sardinia to collect the prize, she took the opportunity to return to Domusnovas, where the community had prepared a photographic exhibition of her time in the village and everyone wanted to meet her, despite the fact that her work there had been more than 60 years earlier.

== Death ==
Elda Mazzocchi Scarzella died in Milan on 6 May 2005 at the age of 100. Her ashes are in the family tomb in the Milan Monumental Cemetery. Milan City Council honoured her with a minute's silence and her name is recorded in the cemetery's Famedio (Pantheon) of illustrious people.

Mazzocchi's archives and her collection of about 900 books are mainly preserved at the Archive for the History of Education in Italy at the Brescia campus of the Università Cattolica del Sacro Cuore (Catholic University of the Sacred Heart).
