= Private Secretary (TV series) =

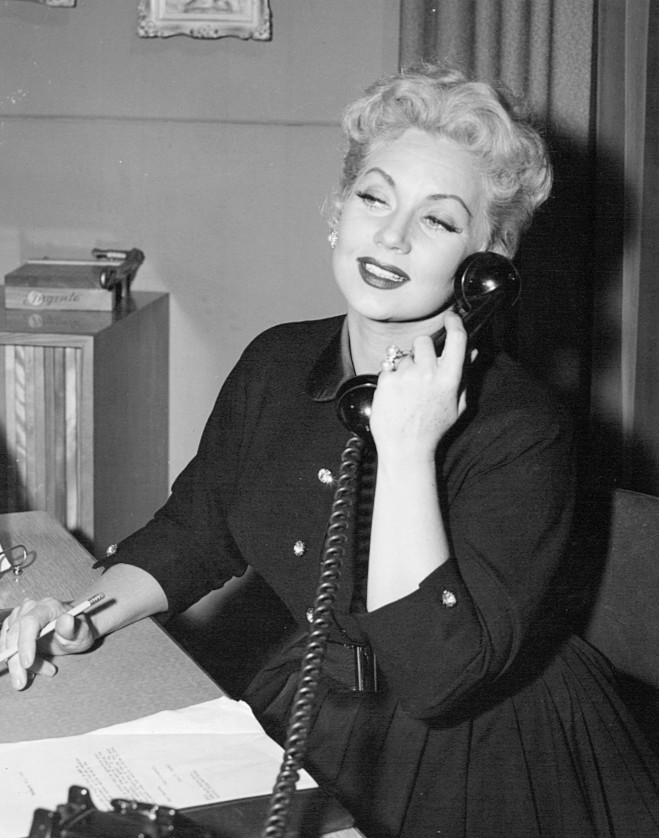
- Sothern as Susie McNamara, 1954
- Also known as: Susie
- Genre: Sitcom
- Created by: Ned Marin
- Starring: Ann Sothern; Don Porter; Ann Tyrrell
- Country of origin: United States
- Original language: English
- No. of seasons: 5
- No. of episodes: 104 (list of episodes)

Production
- Executive producers: Jack Chertok; Harry Poppe
- Running time: 24-25 mins
- Production company: Jack Chertok Television Productions

Original release
- Network: CBS
- Release: February 1, 1953 – March 17, 1957

Private Secretary (also known as Susie) is an American sitcom that aired on CBS from February 1, 1953, to March 17, 1957. Created by Ned Marin, the series stars Ann Sothern as Susan Camille "Susie" MacNamara, devoted secretary to handsome talent agent Peter Sands, played by Don Porter.

== Overview ==
Susie MacNamara (Sothern) is a former stage actress, a WAC veteran of World War II and single woman who works as the private secretary for theatrical agent Peter Sands (Porter) at the fictional New York theatrical agency International Artists Inc. Susie's honest, good-natured attempts to help Mr. Sands, especially in romantic matters, always leads to comedic complications. Susie is usually assisted by her best friend, Violet "Vi" Praskins (Ann Tyrrell), the office's nervous and bumbling receptionist. Recurring characters include Jesse White as Mickey "Cagey" Calhoun, a chief competitor and loudmouthed agent business rival to Susie and Sands; and Joan Banks as Sylvia Platt, a fellow secretary frenemy of Susie.

One of the show's trademarks was the set decoration portraying a 1950s state-of-the-art executive office, with stylish decor, IBM typewriters and the latest office telephone gear from Western Electric. There are occasional references to a young actress, never seen, who was a client of Mr. Sands named Harriet Lake (Sothern's real name).

=== Series ending ===
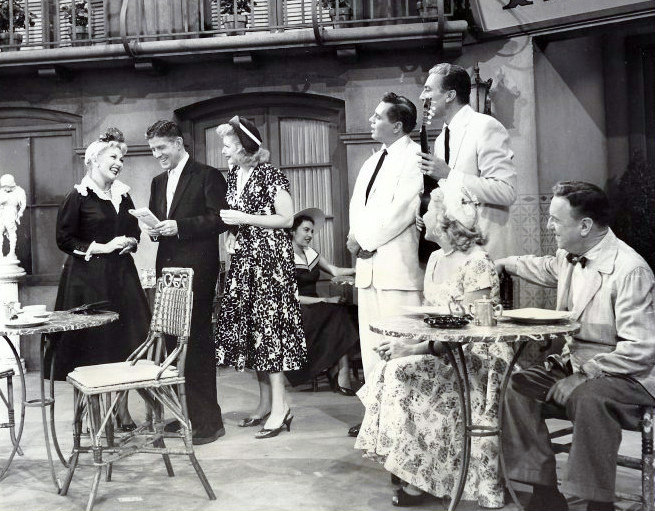
As "Susie McNamara" on The Lucy–Desi Comedy Hour, "Lucy Takes a Cruise to Havana", L-R: Ann Sothern, Rudy Vallee, Lucille Ball, Desi Arnaz, Cesar Romero, Vivian Vance and William Frawley (1957)

Although ratings had dropped in its fifth season, CBS renewed the series for a sixth season in Spring 1957. However, Sothern discovered that producer Jack Chertok sold the series rights to Metromedia without consulting or compensating her. Sothern, who owed back taxes to the Internal Revenue Service, sued Chertok and departed the series.

In November, Sothern reprised the character of Susie MacNamara for the premiere episode of The Lucille Ball-Desi Arnaz Show (later shown in repeats as The Lucy–Desi Comedy Hour). In this installment, entitled "Lucy Takes a Cruise to Havana" (which was originally a 75-minute episode), Sothern appeared opposite series regulars Lucille Ball, Desi Arnaz, Vivian Vance, William Frawley and Richard Keith as well as guest stars Hedda Hopper, Rudy Vallee and Cesar Romero. As a result of the success of the special, Sothern developed a new series with Ball and Arnaz through Desilu. The resulting series, The Ann Sothern Show, would air for three seasons on CBS from 1958 to 1961. The series employed much of the same cast and writers as Private Secretary.

== Episodes ==
Season	Episodes	Originally released		Rank	Rating
Season	Episodes	First released	Last released	Rank	Rating
1	16	February 1, 1953	June 7, 1953	—N/a	—N/a
2	26	September 20, 1953	June 6, 1954	#24	7.88
3	26	September 12, 1954	June 26, 1955	#19	9.89
4	21	September 11, 1955	June 10, 1956	#12	11.31
5	15	September 9, 1956	March 17, 1957	#25	11.28

== Release ==
Private Secretary aired on CBS for all of its five seasons, alternating opposite weeks with The Jack Benny Program on Sundays at 7:30pm EST. However, in an unusual move, the series also had two brief runs on rival network NBC during the summers of 1953 and 1954. The series served as a summer replacement for Your Hit Parade, which like Private Secretary, was sponsored by Lucky Strike Cigarettes.

=== Syndication ===
Before Private Secretary went into syndication, the opening title sequence and series name were changed. The series, which was sponsored by American Tobacco for Lucky Strike cigarettes during its original run, featured the company’s sponsor I.D. in the opening title sequence which could not be aired in syndication. An animated title sequence was made featuring a cartoon "Susie."

The series' name was also changed when producer Jack Chertok withheld the rights to the show's original title in hopes of replacing Sothern with another actress in the title role. Chertok released Susie into syndication in the fall of 1956. The original title sequence has not been shown since Private Secretary's original run.

Susie aired on Nick at Nite from January 1987 to June 1990.

=== Home media ===
In 2006, two video distributors, Critics' Choice and Alpha Video, released one volume of the series on Region 1 DVD in the United States. Both releases were identical with the exception of the artwork. Both companies released three more identical volumes. The latest, volume four, was released in April 2007. Each volume contains four episodes of the series from varying seasons.

== Reception ==
=== Nielsen ratings ===
- Season 1: N/A
- Season 2: #24
- Season 3: #19
- Season 4: #12
- Season 5: #25

=== Award nominations ===
Year	Award	Category	Nominee
1955	Emmy Award	Best Actress Starring in a Regular Series	Ann Sothern
1955	Emmy Award	Best Situation Comedy Series	Private Secretary
1956	Emmy Award	Best Cinematography for Television	Robert Pittack
1956	Emmy Award	Best Actress - Continuing Performance	Ann Sothern
1957	Emmy Award	Best Continuing Performance by a Comedienne in a Series	Ann Sothern
