= Elinor Goldschmied =

English educationist

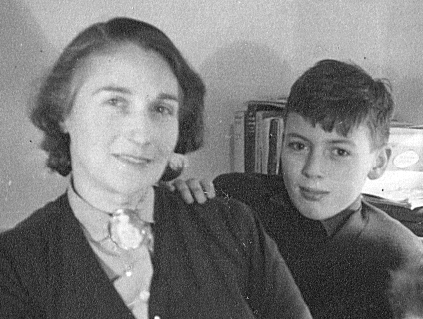
- Elinor Goldschmied with her son Marco
- Born: Violet Elinor Sinnott; 15 December 1910; Gloucestershire, England
- Died: 27 February 2009 (aged 98)
- Education: Clifton High School, Bristol; Froebel College; London School of Economics
- Occupation: Educationalist
- Years active: 1946–2002
- Spouse: Guido Goldschmied

Violet Elinor Goldschmied (née Sinnott; 15 December 1910 – 27 February 2009) was an English educationalist. Educated at the London School of Economics and qualified as a psychiatric social worker, she worked in an Italian state institution for illegitimate and abandoned children before moving to a home for single mothers in Milan, overseeing changes to the education of children and the training of staff, leading to a transformation of childcare in Italy. Goldschmied developed the concept of the "treasure basket" containing safe, multi-sensory household items in a low, open basket, for children able to sit and explore independently without physical adult intervention. The concept of "heuristic play" grew out of the treasure basket as a means of autonomous play for babies under the age of two. Goldschmied also developed the "Key Person approach" within non-maternal childcare settings for establishing meaningful attachment relationships within nurseries.

== Biography ==
=== Early life ===
Elinor Violet Sinnott was born to a middle-class family in rural Gloucestershire on 15 December 1910. She was the fourth of seven children and was raised in the countryside. Goldschmied's brother died when she was eight years old and the death of her mother followed shortly afterwards. At age 12, Elinor (and her elder sister) left the family home to live with their grandfather in Bristol, where she was educated at the Clifton High School in Bristol and she subsequently became head girl. There, she made the decision to enter into a career in education and trained to be a nursery teacher at the Froebel College in Roehampton. Goldschmied worked in the Dartington Hall Junior School for five years in the 1930s.

She won a scholarship to enroll into a mental health course at the London School of Economics Department of Mental Health in 1937 and qualified as a psychiatric social worker. Goldschmied took part in left-wing causes while she was at the university and was a member of the Communist Party of Great Britain. During the Second World War she began as an employee in the mental health sector in the city of Bradford, where she worked with refugees and evacuated children; the latter group with whom she worked were between the ages of two and four and all were deemed "unbilletable" because of poor behaviour. Goldschmied got the children to behave better by undertaking a major reorganisation of their daily routines.

=== Career to death ===
In 1946, she and her husband Guido relocated to Trieste, Italy, while the commune was under British administration. Goldschmied found a job working in a state institution for illegitimate and abandoned children. During this period she observed babies and children in local orphanages barred from having toys or relationships with other human beings and sought change in this area. In 1948, Goldschmied met Elda Mazzocchi Scarzella, the founder of a home for single mothers in Milan, called the Villaggio della Madre e del Fanciullo. There she oversaw the nursery education of the children and training of the staff and pioneered a transformation of childcare in Italy. This experience led to the publication of Goldschmied's first book, The Child in the Nursery, which was one of the first works to address the group care of infant children.

In 1954, she took part in the production of two films in Trieste. The first, Lasciatemi almeno giocare, discusses play and how it aids in the development of a child's motor and psycho-affective in situations of social distress and institutionalisation. The other film was entitled L’adulto nel mondo dei più piccoli was created with assistance from residents of Trieste, and is centred on the role and function of an educator in the relationship with a child in a nursery. After her husband's death in 1955, Goldschmied flew to England to ensure that her son could receive a secondary education in the country. She was employed by London County Council from 1960 to 1965 as a social education worker in the field of mental health of small children, and lobbied against the practice of putting children into care for non-attendance. Goldschmied was later made Head of the Office for Wellness and Education at Inner London Education Authority and she served in the role until 1972, her final full-time occupation.

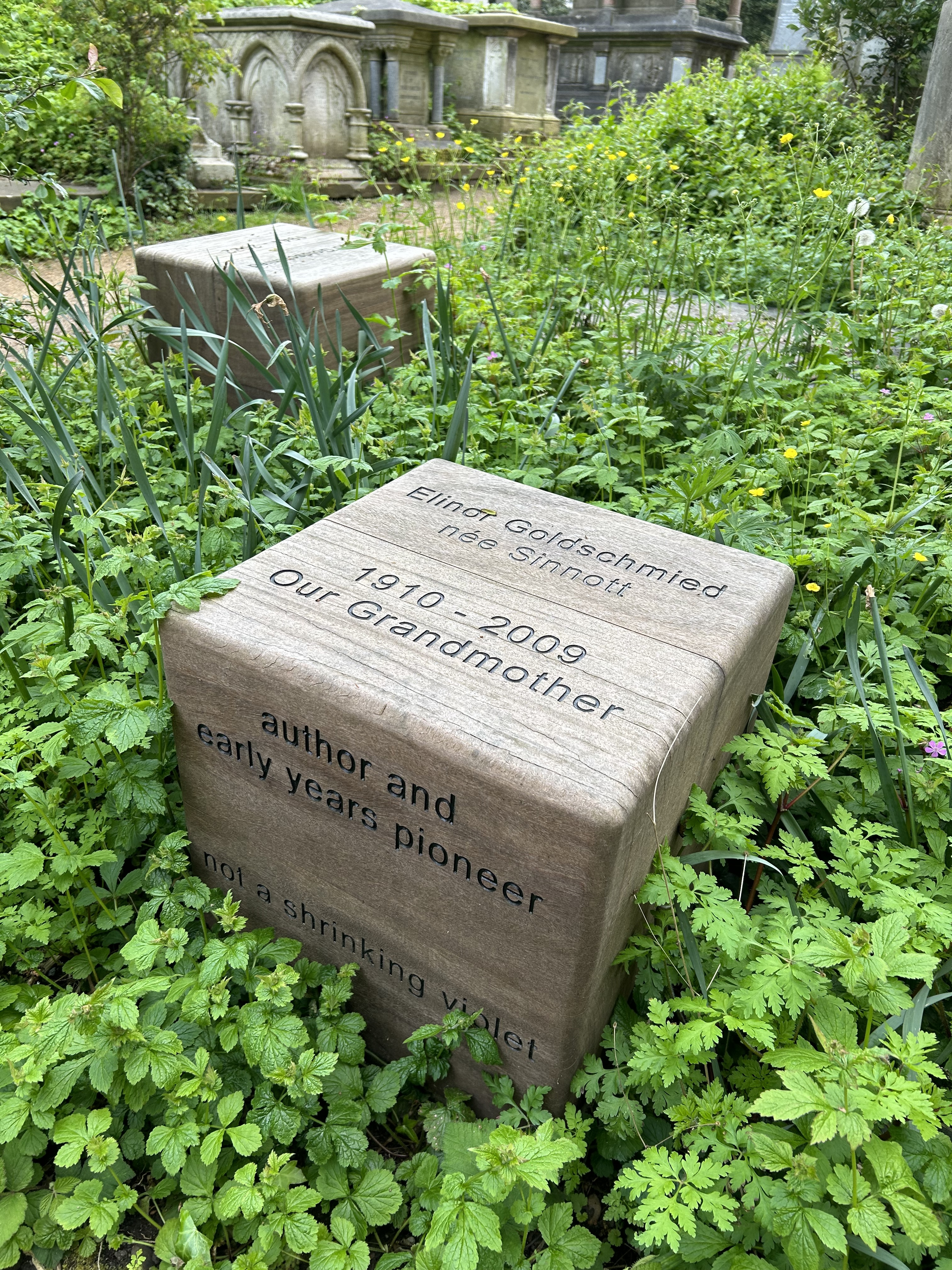
Grave of Elinor Goldschmied in Highgate Cemetery

While Goldschmied was working for the Inner London Education Authority, she and the educational psychologist Anita Hughes chose to review what babies were provided with and observed their fixation for independent learning and playing. The two developed courses for child minders and individuals who specialised in children's play. It led to the introduction of "heuristic play" to promote a relaxed form of play for babies under the age of two and for maintaining a special relationship with an individual member of staff; Goldschmied had in 1948 introduced a "treasure basket" containing non-dangerous household items that vary in feel and texture and are presented in a low, open basket, which was theorised as an exploration activity that lasted for less than an hour with no physical intervention by an overseeing adult. Goldschmied further developed the concepts into play sessions that play nurseries were introduced with adults not required to direct the play by action or verbal commands. The ideas were published in the 1994 book People Under Three: Children in Daycare, which she co-authored with Sonia Jackson.

From 1978 to 1998, she visited Italy three times per year as a consultant. Goldschmied also performed consultancy roles in the London boroughs of Hammersmith, Fulham, and Islington as well as in the Spanish community of Catalonia. She died on 27 February 2009 and was buried on the western side of Highgate Cemetery in North London.

== Personality ==
The Therapeutic Care Journal obituarist described Goldschmied as "a very small woman with a huge personality" and a person who was not judgemental and accepting of others. She eschewed grand theories, and refused to categorise or label any child as having special needs.

== Legacy ==
Sonia Jackson, the professor of social care and education at the UCL Institute of Education, called Goldschmied "one of the pioneers of early childhood care and education". In early 2018, her original treasure basket was discovered and the Goldschmied family loaned it to The Froebel Trust for display at the Foyle Special Collections room at the University of Roehampton.
