= List of Private Secretary episodes =

This is a list of episodes of the television series Private Secretary (known as Susie in syndication). The series aired on CBS from February 1, 1953, to March 17, 1957, for a total of 104 episodes.

== Series overview ==
Season	Episodes	Originally released		Rank	Rating
Season	Episodes	First released	Last released	Rank	Rating
1	16	February 1, 1953	June 7, 1953	—N/a	—N/a
2	26	September 20, 1953	June 6, 1954	#24	7.88
3	26	September 12, 1954	June 26, 1955	#19	9.89
4	21	September 11, 1955	June 10, 1956	#12	11.31
5	15	September 9, 1956	March 17, 1957	#25	11.28

== Episodes ==
=== Season 1 (1953) ===
No. overall	No. in season	Title	Directed by	Written by	Original release date
1	1	"Femme Fatale"	Christian Nyby	Tom Seller	February 1, 1953
To discourage Mr. Sands' niece from chasing after an older man, Susie pretends to be interested in the niece's boyfriend.
2	2	"The Bachelor Takes a Wife"	Unknown	Curtis Kenyon	February 8, 1953
A client is interested in Mr. Sands, so Susie plays matchmaker. She also help out a TV actor known as "The Bachelor."
3	3	"The Eyes Have It"	Unknown	Leonard Gershe	February 15, 1953
A hypnotist puts Susie under his spell to get a contract. Mr. Sands thinks her odd behavior is a nervous breakdown.
4	4	"Where There Is a Will"	Unknown	Leonard Gershe	February 22, 1953
Hypochondriac Peter Sands lands in the hospital with a tummy ache, convinced he's not long for this world. Susie's idea for getting him back to work is to reminisce about previous adventures in show business. One of those times, he turned down lousy violinist Jack Benny.
5	5	"Old Flame"	Unknown	Tom Seller	March 1, 1953
An old boyfriend visits and Susie tries to relight the romance. He, however, simply wants her opinion of a dancer he's planning to marry.
6	6	"Servant Problem"	Unknown	Leonard Gershe	March 8, 1953
In the process of keeping a couple from pulling their backing from a show, Susie has to pose as a maid.
7	7	"Old Soldiers"	Unknown	Curtis Kenyon	March 15, 1953
When an old pal from the Air Force Reserve asks Mr. Sands to Washington, he thinks he's being called for duty. Actually, the colonel wants him to put together a USO show.
8	8	"Lady from Paris"	Unknown	Tom Seller	March 29, 1953
After signing a French nightclub singer by mistake, Susie hears rumors that the woman is an impostor from Brooklyn.
9	9	"Suspicion"	Unknown	Phil Davis	April 4, 1953
Peter takes a secretive phone call and a mysterious Mr. Hollis shows up at the office. Susie, of course, thinks the man is her replacement. When she goes into Mr. Sands' office to face the music, she finds her surprise birthday party. Mr. Hollis is her temporary replacement, while she goes away on vacation... more or less.
10	10	"A Man Called Smith"	Unknown	Tom Seller	April 12, 1953
In the series' pilot, Susie deviously gets Mr. Sands to hear a new singer, and she searches for a reclusive author.
11	11	"Star Struck"	Unknown	Leonard Gershe	April 26, 1953
Susie is supposed to be on a date with a dreamy movie actor, but instead she's forced to entertain a writer's disagreeable spouse.
12	12	"Whodunit?"	Unknown	Phil Davis	May 3, 1953
Susie is working with a young woman from her hometown (Mumford, Iowa) when the two are kidnapped by a group of thugs.
13	13	"Too Much Spring"	Unknown	Leonard Gershe	May 10, 1953
Susie and Vi celebrate the first of spring by daydreaming about marriage to Mr. Sands.
14	14	"Penny Wise, Pound Foolish"	Unknown	Phil Davis	May 24, 1953
Mr. Sands' cost-cutting measures cost him money in the end.
15	15	"Child Labor"	Unknown	Jerry Adelman	May 31, 1953
Mr. Sands loses a client when Susie talks a pushy stage mother into letting her daughter have a normal childhood.
16	16	"Dark Stranger"	Unknown	Tom Seller	June 7, 1953
A fortune-teller informs Vi that a tall, dark stranger will soon enter Susie's life. Susie hopes this mysterious person will help her find Mr. Sands' missing ring.

=== Season 2 (1953–54) ===
No. overall	No. in season	Title	Directed by	Written by	Original release date
17	1	"Havana or Bust"	Christian Nyby	Larry Rhine	September 20, 1953
Susie's been bragging that she's going to Havana on business with Mr. Sands. Now, she has to talk Mr. Sands into taking her with him.
18	2	"Two Weeks with Pay"	Unknown	Unknown	September 27, 1953
As job insurance, Susie thinks she's hired an unattractive old woman to fill in while she's vacationing. She returns to find, instead, a devious secretary named Flame.
19	3	"Miami"	Unknown	Unknown	October 11, 1953
Susie and Cagey both try to sign the same good-looking singer while Sylvia paints the town with the men of Miami.
20	4	"The Hubby Killer"	Unknown	Unknown	October 18, 1953
Susie's houseguest is an actress from South American known as "the hubby killer." Naturally, Susie and Sylvia are watching her like hawks.
21	5	"The Little Acorn That Didn't Grow"	Unknown	Larry Rhine	November 1, 1953
Susie searches for a job for an elevator operator who's also a classical violinist. She and Mr. Sands are treated to a private concert when the musician stops the elevator between floors.
22	6	"Cast Thy Bread"	Unknown	Phil Davis	November 8, 1953
Susie's new hat is pilfered by an old butler as a gift for his boss, a one-time star of the theatre. She lets the man keep her hat and tries to get Mr. Sands to hire the former diva.
23	7	"Weekend in Connecticut"	Unknown	Unknown	November 11, 1953
Susie has assumed that Mr. Sands' business trips are more about pleasure than business. She learns otherwise when she is stuck spending the weekend with a woman writer in Connecticut.
24	8	"Seven Out of Ten"	Unknown	Unknown	November 29, 1953
Susie misinterprets Mr. Sands' attempt to improve efficiency as signs of love. In the meantime, a friend of Vi's from Brooklyn poses as a socialite.
25	9	"Two of a Kind"	Unknown	Unknown	December 13, 1953
Susie helps an eccentric old actress get cast in a theatrical production.
26	10	"Girl of the Year"	Unknown	Unknown	December 20, 1953
Susie wins a "Secretary of the Year" award, and promptly gets herself fired.
27	11	"The Blau-Holstein Memoirs"	Unknown	Leonard Gershe	January 3, 1954
A battle for the memoirs of a European princess pit Susie and Cagey Calhoun head-to-head.
28	12	"Sable Coat"	Unknown	Phil Davis	January 10, 1954
A French film star gives Susie a fur coat refused by his fiance. The gift makes Susie's friends jealous.
29	13	"Shrinking Vi"	Unknown	Leonard Gershe	January 24, 1954
Matchmaker Susie tries to connect a neighbor, a meterorologist, with Vi.
30	14	"The Little Monster"	Christian Nyby	Richard Morris	January 31, 1954
Susie encounters a precocious child actor known on stage as "The Little Monster," and in real life as well.
31	15	"Mind Over Matter"	Unknown	Larry Rhine	February 14, 1954
Susie is back in the matchmaking business, working on Vi's cowboy pen pal.
32	16	"Friend in Need"	Unknown	Tom Seller	February 21, 1954
Susie is laid up in bed with a nasty cold, yet none of her so-called friends drop by to check on her.
33	17	"Vive L'Amour"	Christian Nyby	Phil Davis	March 7, 1954
Susie flies to Paris with a mission: convince movie star Armende that his girlfriend is only after his money.
34	18	"Tempest in a Pickle Jar"	Unknown	Larry Rhine	March 14, 1954
Tommy is fingered as a hot dog thief, but Susie is on the trail of the real thief.
35	19	"And Susie Is the Sun"	Unknown	Unknown	March 28, 1954
Harold Lemaire has a crush on Susie and insists on coming between her and a man. Her solution is to fix him up with a girl his age.
36	20	"High Spirits"	Unknown	Unknown	April 4, 1954
Stories are being leaked to a gossip columnist and Susie has discovered the source: Vi's phony medium.
37	21	"Live Wire"	Christian Nyby	Jack Laird	April 18, 1954
A new employee at the agency is trying to take over Peter's client list.
38	22	"A Still Small Voice"	Unknown	Phil Davis	April 25, 1954
Susie and Vi put a guilt trip on Mr. Sands after he shoots a deer on a hunting trip.
39	23	"April Showers"	Unknown	Louella MacFarlane	May 9, 1954
Sylvia announces her engagement to a jewelry merchant, Francis, who's a womanizer. Despite being Sylvia's fiance, he flirts shamelessly with Susie. When a bouquet of roses arrives for Susie at the office, the innocent Susie is branded a "Jezebel."
40	24	"Crazy Mixed-up Kid"	Unknown	Unknown	May 16, 1954
An actor, hungry to make a name, engages in publicity stunts that are hurting his career. Susie steps in to show him the way.
41	25	"A Matter of Taste"	Christian Nyby	Leonard Gershe	May 30, 1954
Mr. Sands and Susie try to talk a famous chef into revealing his recipes in a television series.
42	26	"No Rest for the Weary"	Unknown	Phil Davis	June 6, 1954
Both Susie and Cagey Calhoun are in pursuit of a concert pianist who's hiding out at a rest home.

=== Season 3 (1954–55) ===
No. overall	No. in season	Title	Directed by	Written by	Original release date
43	1	"Good Neighbor"	Oscar Rudolph	Tom Seller	September 12, 1954
Susie has been babysitting a neighbor's baby. When the parents' return is delayed, she takes the child with her to the office.
44	2	"The Rivals"	Oscar Rudolph	Leonard Gershe	September 19, 1954
Susie and Sylvia are on vacation in the Poconos when they encounter Cagey and Ben, his assistant. Both pursue the same woman because they think the other wants to sign her.
45	3	"Where, Oh Where?"	Unknown	Tom Seller	September 26, 1954
Susie's friends fear she's been fired when she does not show up for work following a fight with Mr. Sands. The mood turns to mourning when they hear a rumor of her untimely demise.
46	4	"One Bewitching Hour"	Unknown	Phil Davis	October 10, 1954
Susie is back to matchmaking, this time between a famous actress and a singer who were once married.
47	5	"The Brass Ring"	Unknown	Phil Davis	October 24, 1954
Vi writes the music and the rest of the office compose the lyrics to a song. They're convinced they've got a hit on their hands -- until it's rejected. Not easily discouraged, they next tackle a newspaper rebus puzzle with zeal.
48	6	"Humpty Dumpty"	Unknown	Richard Morris	November 7, 1954
Precocious child performer Harold Lemaire signs with agent Cagey Calhoun. Susie teaches Harold a lesson by signing a replacement for him.
49	7	"Original and Two Carbons"	Oscar Rudolph	Richard Morris	November 11, 1954
To look like a certain Broadway star, Mr. Sands grows a moustache. Susie mocks him by going brunette and wearing a monacle just like one of their female clients.
50	8	"Susie for President"	Unknown	Tom Seller	December 5, 1954
Susie and Sylvia become opponents when each runs for president of the Midtown Secretaries League.
51	9	"Goodbye, Susie, Hello"	Christian Nyby	Leonard Gershe	December 19, 1954
Carl Evans tries to lure Susie away by offering her more pay. When Peter encourages her to go for the money, she thinks Mr. Sands no longer wants her services. She's bored and unhappy because Carl does not heed her advice like Mr. Sands does. To get herself fired, Susie ruins her boss' coffee, wears hideous glasses and refuses to answer the phone, despite talking on it constantly.
52	10	"Sweet Foxy"	Unknown	Unknown	January 2, 1955
Susie feels sorry for Cagey and Ben when she learns they're broke, so she helps them sign up a new singer.
53	11	"Secretaries Are People, Too"	Oscar Rudolph	Sig Herzig	January 16, 1955
Susie gets even with a snooty actress when she instructs her on how to play a secretary on stage.
54	12	"Screaming Meemies"	Unknown	Arnold Belgard	January 30, 1955
Susie's suggestion that Mr. Sands take a brief rest in quiet Vermont sounds like a good idea. Perhaps it was too good; he returns to announce he's selling his agency and retiring to a farm.
55	13	"Tangled Web"	Oscar Rudolph	Jerry Adelman	February 13, 1955
After forgetting to type a letter that Mr. Sands had dictated, Susie tells him that it was stolen.
56	14	"Blessing in Disguise"	Unknown	Leonard Gershe	February 27, 1955
Vi is delighted by a geranium given to her by a client, but horrified when it dies.
57	15	"Tenth Anniversary"	Unknown	Sig Herzig	March 13, 1955
Susie marks ten years on the job by having her bracelet melted into a holder for Mr. Sands' gold coin. He, meanwhile, has his coin made into a pin for her.
58	16	"Progress Is Here to Stay"	Unknown	Sig Herzig	March 27, 1955
Susie takes to pouting to get Mr. Sands to buy a new modern device: an electric typewriter. After he declares these modern devices unnecessary, Susie takes the idea to extremes to make her point.
59	17	"Mambo"	Oscar Rudolph	Unknown	April 10, 1955
Mr. Sands needs to learn the mambo in a hurry if he hopes to sign Latin performer Dolores Mendoza.
60	18	"Anything Can Happen"	Unknown	Phil Davis	April 24, 1955
A friend's mistaken belief that she's inherited a million dollars is used by Susie in her plot to purchase an extravagant fur-trimmed coat.
61	19	"A Scream in the Night"	Oscar Rudolph	Story by : Ned Marin; Teleplay by : Leonard Gershe	May 8, 1955
Susie and her rival Cagey are fighting for the rights to a story from a late mystery author. They discover that the dearly departed author is still quite vocal about his work.
62	20	"The Perfect Specimen"	Unknown	Leonard Gershe	May 15, 1955
Susie accidentally hits the car of a millionaire, and then begins dating him.
63	21	"An Ounce of Prevention"	Unknown	Arnold Bogard	May 22, 1955
To keep a heavy actress from losing a part, Susie moves in to keep her from gaining more weight.
64	22	"Mr. Neanderthal"	Unknown	Richard Morris	May 29, 1955
Susie's trying to find a boxer who can fill the title role in a play called "Mr. Neanderthal."
65	23	"Candy"	Unknown	Unknown	June 5, 1955
While waiting for an elevator, Mr. Sands overhears an employer speak to his secretary unnecessarily harshly. Not wanting to see the man ruin his reputation, Peter talks him into sending the secretary a box of candy.
66	24	"Finders Keepers"	Oscar Rudolph	Tom Seller	June 12, 1955
Sylvia, Susie and Vi find a diamond pendant worth $3000. While they hesitantly search for its owner, they dream of how they'll spend the money.
67	25	"The Root of All Evil"	Unknown	Unknown	June 16, 1955
When a young woman becomes smitten over Peter Sands, Susie suspects she's just after his money.
68	26	"The Boy Next Door"	Oscar Rudolph	Unknown	June 26, 1955
After lamenting their lack of dates for the evening, Susie, Vi and Sylvia figure out the best way to "catch" a good-looking new neighbor.

=== Season 4 (1955–56) ===
No. overall	No. in season	Title	Directed by	Written by	Original release date
69	1	"Oh, Oh, Suzette"	Oscar Rudolph	Leonard Gershe & Sig Herzig	September 11, 1955
Susie takes a job with a cold-as-a-fish financier. She figures out how to warm him up — by dancing the Charleston.
70	2	"The Slow Curve"	Unknown	Unknown	September 18, 1955
Susie tries to sign popular baseball player Whizzer Wade to a contract with her office.
71	3	"Whistler's Daughter"	Unknown	Unknown	October 2, 1955
Susie beings painting to calm her nerves. One of her paintings sells and she's ready to become a full-time artist.
72	4	"America's Sweethearts"	Oscar Rudolph	Leonard Gershe	October 16, 1955
Susie seeks to soothe the bruised egos of a young theatrical couple.
73	5	"The Platt Plan"	Unknown	Unknown	October 30, 1955
Susie decides to try Sylvia's plan for getting a raise.
74	6	"Midtown Mardi Gras"	Unknown	Unknown	November 13, 1955
Susie and Vi invite Mr. Sands to be their escort to the Midtown Secretarial League's Mardi Gras party.
75	7	"Room for Improvement"	Unknown	Unknown	November 27, 1955
Vi practices being a secretary as Susie gets ready to take her vacation.
76	8	"Turnabout"	Unknown	Unknown	December 11, 1955
On "Turnabout Day" at the office, Peter and Susie swap jobs. Peter deals with making coffee and typing while Susie tries to soothe a temperamental client.
77	9	"To Each His Own"	Unknown	Phil Davis	December 25, 1955
A dinner invitation from a friend involves Susie playing talent scout.
78	10	"In Darkest Manhattan"	Oscar Rudolph	Unknown	January 8, 1956
Bored by her secretarial duties, Susie daydreams about working for Peter Sands in the jungle. A reporter from "Modern Secretary Magazine" convinces her that her job is more exciting than she thought.
79	11	"The Shade of the Old Family Tree"	Unknown	Unknown	January 22, 1956
Mr. Sands' attempt to gain admission to an exclusive uptown men's club fails because he does not have the proper social background. Susie solves that by introducing Peter to a magician-turned-genealogist who declares Peter descended from a French nobleman.
80	12	"Little Bo Bop"	Unknown	Unknown	February 5, 1956
Susie finds what she thinks is the best "jump and jive" musician and brings him to the attention of Peter. She also makes an attempt to teach a be-bop musician how to speak regular English.
81	13	"Old Dog, New Tricks"	Oscar Rudolph	Richard Morris	February 19, 1956
Spoiled child actor Harold Lemaire has a crush on Susie. When she fails to properly inflate his ego, he dumps Peter as his agent and goes with slick-talking Cagey Calhoun.
82	14	"Oh, Brother!"	Oscar Rudolph	Leonard Gershe	March 4, 1956
Learning that the night watchman has not seen his brother in 20 years, Susie cooks up a surprise reunion.
83	15	"Cat in a Hot Tin File"	Oscar Rudolph	Sig Herzig	March 18, 1956
Susie and Vi befriend a stray cat that wanders into the office. Taken with the kitty, they hide him (in a filing cabinet) from Mr. Sands and an important actress who's allergic to cats.
84	16	"The Little Caesar of Bleaker Street"	Oscar Rudolph	Richard Morris	April 1, 1956
Chucky Wills, a 10-year-old hoodlum, shows up at the office pretending to be a shoeshine boy. He promptly steals a five dollar bill, but Susie does not call the cops. She makes him work off the money by actually shining shoes. Susie thinks she's begun to reform the boy — until a ring disappears.
85	17	"Seven Ways to Fire"	Unknown	Unknown	April 15, 1956
Susie is convinced she's about to be fired when she overhears part of a phone call and finds a magazine article called "Firing Made Easy" on Peter's desk. She plans to go out with dignity and quit first, but it's a young man who works in the office who's to be fired. She's relieved, but does not want to see the young man go, so she starts to work on saving his gig.
86	18	"Passing the Buck"	Oscar Rudolph	Leonard Gershe	April 29, 1956
Susie and Mr. Sands lose control of a literary masterpiece when they assign Vi the job of reading what they think is an amateur script.
87	19	"Too Good to Be True"	Unknown	Unknown	May 13, 1956
Feeling sorry for her rival Cagey Calhoun, Susie helps get his one client booked in a Broadway show.
88	20	"Susie's Crusade"	Unknown	Unknown	May 27, 1956
While Mr. Sands is trying to renew his office lease, Susie irritates the building manager while trying to help an old cleaning woman.
89	21	"Elusive"	Oscar Rudolph	Leonard Gershe	June 10, 1956
Susie's determined to coax a reclusive silent film star out or retirement and get her signed with Mr. Sands. Attempting to get to the actress, Susie dons several disguises that result in her being arrested for house-breaking.

=== Season 5 (1956–57) ===
No. overall	No. in season	Title	Directed by	Written by	Original release date
90	1	"French Leave"	Oscar Rudolph	Sig Herzig	September 9, 1956
In the season premiere, Peter loans Susie out to a French producer who's visiting in town. The loyal Susie prevents Mr. Sands from being double-crossed.
91	2	"All That Glitters"	Unknown	Phil Davis	September 16, 1956
Susie has dreams of becoming a stock market big shot as she sinks her savings into a questionable uranium stock. Peter and Vi get caught up in the excitement and do the same.
92	3	"The Reunion"	Unknown	Unknown	September 30, 1956
Susie gets together with three old classmates and they convince her she's a social failure.
93	4	"The Sow's Ear"	Oscar Rudolph	Phil Shuken	October 14, 1956
Susie does a favor for her arch enemy Cagey Calhoun. He returns the favor by stealing one of her clients. This means war.
94	5	"How to Handle the Boss"	Oscar Rudolph	Sig Herzig	October 28, 1956
Susie has been chosen by a magazine to write an article on how to handle the boss. The deadline is looming and she's got writer's block. Her boyfriend, Tony, agrees to be her ghostwriter. The article he turns in offends everyone in the office.
95	6	"What Every Secretary Knows"	Oscar Rudolph	Richard Morris	November 11, 1956
Opera impresario Bernard Hugo (Charles Evans) is producing a new musical on Broadway and Mr. Sands is determined to place a couple of his clients into the show. When Hugo would not take Sands' calls, Susie gets involved in the project. She volunteers her boss to host a huge banquet of opera lovers. Nan Leslie appears as Phyllis Gerarde and Madge Blake as Mrs. Hugo.: What Every Secretary Knows
96	7	"Dollars and Sense"	Oscar Rudolph	Leonard Gershe	November 25, 1956
Susie's shopping and spending is out of control. She hands her paycheck to Vi with orders to ration her to just one dollar a day. Vi is unable to control Susie and her money so Mr. Sands is given the job.
97	8	"Her Best Enemy"	Rod Amateau	Leonard Gershe	December 9, 1956
Cagey Calhoun is desperate to get a look at the Meredith contract, the envy of performers in New York. Sure that Susie wouldn't let him see it, he uses psychology, sweet talk, and an accidental fire to try to get his hands on it. When they don't work, he sends in his dear, ancient "mother" to snoop through her files.
98	9	"Three's a Crowd"	Oscar Rudolph	Leonard Gershe	December 23, 1956
A producer and a playwright have both become enchanted with Susie. Each becomes so jealous of the other that they cancel their contracts with Susie's boss.
99	10	"The Big Shot"	Unknown	Unknown	January 6, 1957
An aspiring young actress is promised a starring role in a play — by the agency's office boy.
100	11	"That's No Lady – That's an Agent"	Oscar Rudolph	Sig Herzig	January 20, 1957
Blanche Colvey is a conniving theatrical agent who turns on her feminine charms to steal a Russian singer before he can sign with Peter. Hearing that Blanche wants to hire a secretary who speaks Russian to help her grab the client, Susie dons a black wig and a thick accent, and shows up as Sonia.
101	12	"Not Quite Paradise"	Oscar Rudolph	Leonard Gershe	February 3, 1957
Vi's Aunt Martha and busybody neighbor Della jump to conclusions when she innocently invites Mr. Sands and Susie over for dinner. The two old hens are sure Vi and Peter are a couple and do everything they can to prompt a marriage proposal. This includes making Susie look like an incompetent booze hound.
102	13	"The Efficiency Expert"	Oscar Rudolph	Martin R. Ragaway	February 17, 1957
Mr. Sands takes the advice of a possible future partner and brings in an efficiency expert to streamline the operation. Susie's passive resistance prevents anything from changing.
103	14	"Two and Two Make Five"	Oscar Rudolph	Frederick L. Fox & Peggy Chantler	March 3, 1957
Susie pictures herself serving a long prison sentence when Inspector Bascom of the Internal Revenue Department comes for an audit. She's asked to explain her return, which puts her mixed-up filing system on display. Meanwhile, Mr. Sands searches for a voice for an animated commercial.
104	15	"Thy Name Is Sands"	Oscar Rudolph	Phil Shuken	March 17, 1957
Peter's eyesight has gotten so bad he can't read anything. Only after Susie prevent him from signing a lousy contract does he agree to see an eye doctor. Even after failing the eye test he refuses to get glasses because he's too vain to admit he's getting older.
