= Shane Cloete =

Zimbabwean cricketer

Personal information
- Born: 21 May 1971 (age 55); Salisbury, Rhodesia
- Batting: Right-handed
- Role: Wicket-keeper
- Relatives: Declan Cloete (Son) Bernie Cloete (wife)

Domestic team information
- Years: Team
- 1995/96: Young Mashonaland
- 1994/95: Mashonaland

Career statistics
Competition	First-class
Matches	2
Runs scored	81
Batting average	20.25
100s/50s	–/–
Top score	41
Balls bowled	–
Wickets	–
Bowling average	–
5 wickets in innings	–
10 wickets in match	–
Best bowling	–
Catches/stumpings	1/–
- Source: ESPNcricinfo, 20 October 2012

Shane Cloete (born May 21, 1971) is a teacher and ex-Zimbabwean cricketer. He was a right-handed batsman and wicket-keeper. He was born in Salisbury, Rhodesia (now Harare).

Cloete made two first-class appearances, the first for Mashonaland in 1994-95, in which he scored six runs and ran one batsman out. His second match, in the following season's competition, for Young Mashonaland, saw him score an impressive 34 in the first innings and 41 in the second, though he was unable to secure another first-class appearance.

Cloete was a lower-middle order batsman.

After his cricket playing career, he proceeded to coach and manage the U18, U19, U21 1st squad where they made the placement to semi-finals. He stopped working for Zimbabwe Cricket in 2004, when he moved to the United Kingdom to pursue a career in teaching.

Since 2004, he has worked in four schools, serving as Director of Sport in three of them. He is currently the Director of Sport for Clifton High School, Bristol.
