= Marcello Candia =

Italian businessman

Venerable Marcello Candia
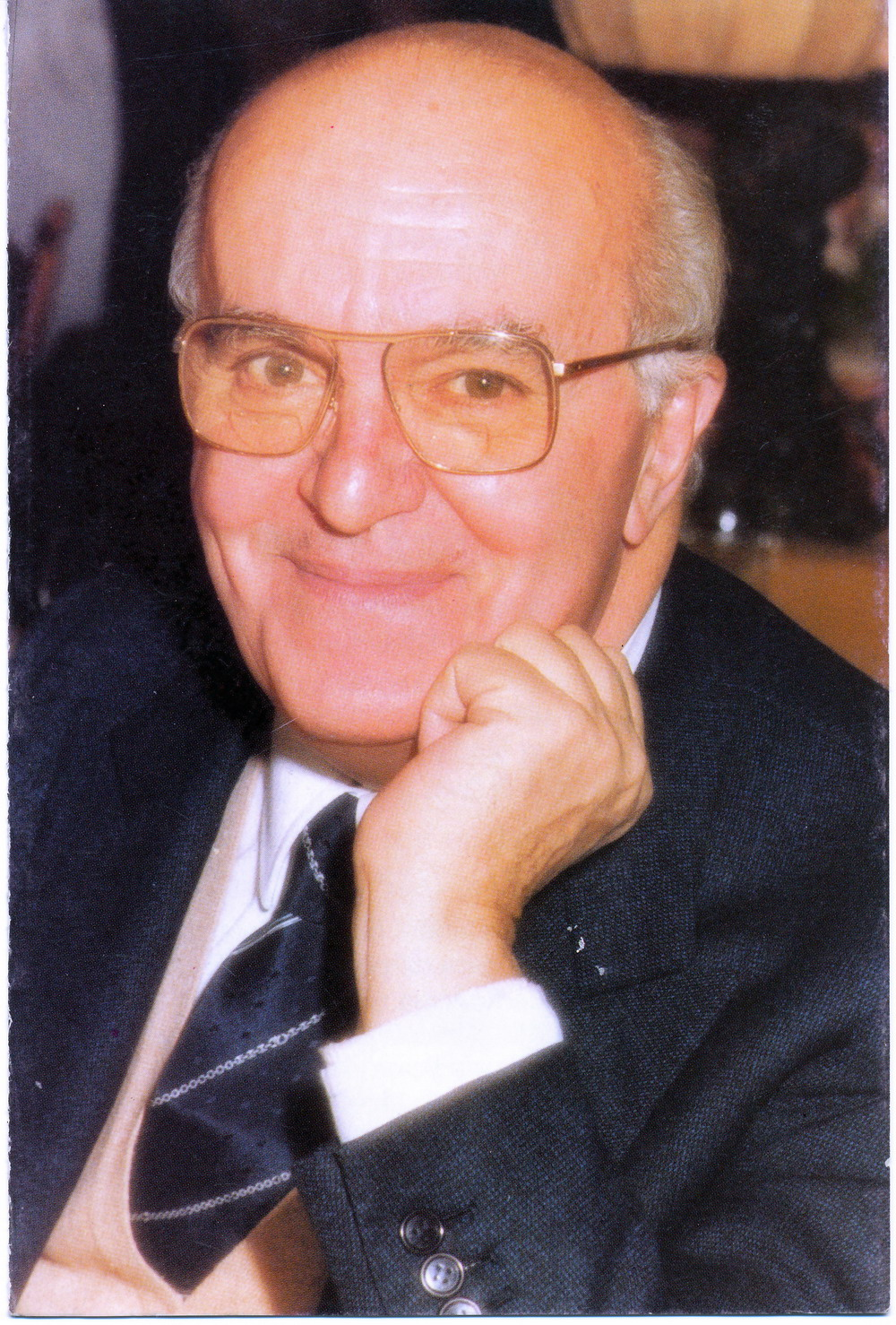
- Born: 27 July 1916; Portici, Naples, Kingdom of Italy
- Died: 31 August 1983 (aged 67); San Pio X Clinic, Milan, Italy

Marcello Candia (27 July 1916 – 31 August 1983) was an Italian Roman Catholic industrialist and entrepreneur who became active in the missions in Brazil. He worked to protect Jewish people during World War II and was involved in preventing their deportation by the creation of new documents that would save the Italian Jews' lives by making pass them as non-Jewish Italians, in particular for kids by hiding them in homes and industries or helping them to safety relocate to the UK or America.
In 1950, at his father's death and at the end of WWII, Marcello Candia assumed full management of his family chemical industrial factory headquartered in Milan with full control of its operation across Italy. After experiencing the world devastation of WWII, Marcello developed a deep awareness for the plight of the poor people, concern that prompted him to sell his factory in 1964 (creating a rift with his younger brother Riccardo) and moved to Brazil to assist the people in need living in the Amazons. In Brazil he worked for the needs of the poor, supporting social justice initiatives and the work of the local charities. Candia was subject to suspicion in the beginning from those missionaries who were confused at someone from a rich background coming to serve the poor as a poor man. He shrugged off those suspicions and considered himself a disciple of the poor who wished to alleviate their suffering and social conditions.

His main concern was the construction of a hospital in Macapá, Brazil, to be managed for the assistance of the poor. The construction started in 1961 and concluded at the decade's end when it was inaugurated in 1971. He also opened a center outside the town he lived in for lepers and worked with them until the end of his life. Candia's health grew worse over time despite his exhaustive work standards which led to several health crises leading to his death back in his native homeland where he had made annual visits.

== Legacy ==
In 1982, not long before his death, Marcello Candia created the Fondazione Dr. Marcello Candia, to assist populations in need by offering health and education programs managed from its main office in Milan, Italy.

The cause for his beatification opened in 1990 titling him as a Servant of God; confirmation of his life of heroic virtue enabled Pope Francis to title Candia as venerable in 2014.

== Life ==
=== Education and activism ===
Marcello Candia was born in 1916 to a Milanese industrialist family, in Naples while his parents were temporarily expanding business in Southern Italy. Marcello is the third of five children to Camillo de Candia, an industrialist from an old aristocratic family of Milan, and Luigia Mussato (often called "Bice"; 1890–7.2.1933) also from an old noble family from Milan. He was baptized on 4 August at the church of Santa Maria della Natività and he later received his Confirmation on 11 June 1925 at the church of Sant'Andrea Apostolo in Como near his parent residence. His siblings were (in order): Linda, Fernanda, Emilia and Riccardo Candia said of his parents: "I had parents who gave me a zeal for life".

He inherited from his father, Dr. Camillo Candia, the largest chemical manufacturer of carbonic-acids in Northern Italy at the time, the renowned "LaFIAC" the "Fabbrica italiana di acido carbonico dottor Candia & C." (English: "Italian Factory of Carbonic Acid, Doctor Candia & Company"), in 1861 registered in Milan as Industrial Society Candia-Solona. His father served as an industrialist and founded several carbonic acid factories with head office in Milan, before transferring operations to Naples and eventually spreading business to Pisa and Aquila. His father, following his mother's devotion, retained his upbringing in the faith but was not active in practicing it; he was respectful of others and was a keen supporter of social justice initiatives. His father was also opposed to fascism and enrolled his children in private schools to ensure his children were not tainted from the totalitarian ideas. Candia's mother instilled the faith in her children and collaborated with local charities; he accompanied his mother to visit the poor at the end of each week.

In 1928 he started to help the Order of Friars Minor Capuchin on Via Piave in Rome in giving soup to the poor. His mother died in 1933 from pneumonia and his grief at her death was so profound that he fell ill and from that moment suffered from frequent headaches and bouts of insomnia. It was after this that the Capuchin friar Cecilio Cortinovis encouraged him to work for local charities. Some people accused him of leading a double life since he was rich and elegant while, on the other hand, he was in constant dialogue with God and wanted nothing more than to serve Him. In 1939 he acquired a Ph.D. that made him a chemist and he worked at the beginning of World War II in explosives before he worked with his father and continued his studies at University of Pavia. He earned his doctorate in 1943 in biological sciences. Since September 1943, Candia took active part participating in the resistance against the Nazi forces that occupied the region (also working with the National Liberation Committee) and he often risked his own life working with the Capuchin friars assisting the Jews threatened with deportation. The war's end saw him help deportees and prisoners return to their homes while he opened a medical and humanitarian welcome center at the local train station with three friends.

=== Post World War II initial work ===
In 1945, Marcelo Candia and Elda Mazzocchi Scarzella founded the "House of Mother and Child" to take care of and help teenage women in crisis pregnancies and their children. He hid this from his father thinking he would not approve, though he found out and approved of it knowing that it did good work for those who needed it most. His father thought that his son's piousness and regular Mass attendance was exaggerated though he never interfered in this. His Capuchin spiritual director (Fra Genesio da Gallarate; secular: Alessandro Premazzi) did not approve of his collaboration with Marzocchi, believing that a home for teenage mothers was not a suitable environment for one who desired to live celibate. Candia, therefore, ended his involvement. Among some of his initiatives, he collaborated in the creation of a lay missionary liaison body, organizing the dispatch of medicines on missions, established in 1947 the magazine La Mission of study and missionary culture. He created an academic missionary medical exchange with Father Genesio, one of the fundamental figures for the formation of the young Marcello Candia, tale organization, was responsible for assisting the first young people who were sent from Italy to study or were invited to Italy by Candia himself on the recommendation of the respective bishops. He participated in the foundation of CUAMM the University College of Aspiring Missionary Doctors, of the AFI the International Female Auxiliaries and of GRAAL a Female Missionary Association of Adele Pignatelli. In 1947 he founded, still in Milan, in Via Kramer, a missionary clinic under the initials of the UMMI, the Union of Italian Missionaries Doctors, an association entrusted to the Congregation of the Poor Servants of Divine Providence of Don Giovanni Calabria. He later co-founded the "College for Overseas Students" in Milan alongside Giuseppe Lazzati at the encouragement of the new Archbishop of Milan Giovanni Battista Montini – the future Pope Paul VI.

In 1950 his father died and he inherited the business. During the night of 22 October 1955 there was an accidental explosion of 60 000 liters of carbonic acid that killed two people while causing destruction to the warehouse that had just been renovated. Candia provided for the families of the victims and assumed the task of reconstructing the warehouse so that no client or worker would be wronged due to the accident. It was around this point that he first met the Capuchin friar Alberto Beretta (the brother of Saint Gianna) who was preparing to leave for the missions in Brazil; during his conversation with Beretta Marcello learned of the terrible conditions of the poor people of the Amazones. In 1957 he made his first visit to Macapá in Brazil, where he studied the issues and assessed the local needs and problems at the request of the PIME priest Aristide Pirovano. Eventually, he commissioned the building of a church for the Saint Benedict parish. In 1965, he met in a private audience with Pope Paul VI just before moving to Brazil. Later he said of the decision: "I am called to live with them". One of his initial barriers was his difficulties in learning the Brazilian Portuguese language. To finance his Missionary enterprise, Candia sold his father's business the profitable Italian Factory of Carbonic Acid, Dr. Candia & Company, leaving all behind in Italy and relocating to Macapá; around that time in 1964 this action caused an extreme rift with his younger brother Riccardo who resented the fact that he sold the organization to go to Brazil.

=== Brazil ===
Once he was living full-time in Brazil, he could dedicate himself to his dream of helping the poor people of the Amazones, through the construction of a local hospital dedicated for the poor, though he made annual visits to his home in Italy. In 1961, he began the construction utilizing his own fortune to fund the initiative since he wanted to name the hospital in honor of his parents. Unfortunately, in 1967 he suffered a heart attack causing a decline in his health though he returned to work after making gradual improvement. It was after this incident that in 1967 he decided to organize a hospital for the lepers in Marituba as well as providing them with additional essential services. In 1969 his hospital was inaugurated, at that moment he remembered the important advice of the then-Cardinal Montini "to make the hospital for the poor people of Brazil" rather than just a plain hospital with a narrow or personal purpose. Candia liked reading about the lives of Pier Giorgio Frassati and Saint Thérèse of Lisieux. At his new home he had no running water in his room; this prompted him to use the tap-water outside to fill a jug to wash and shave. In 1975 a popular Brazilian magazine dedicated a long article to him titled "The Best Man in Brazil". He was quick to shrug this honor off and said: "I am but a humble instrument of Providence". After 1967 he suffered four consecutive heart attacks and grew fearful that another could claim his life; on 9 April 1977 (Good Friday) he had to have a triple bypass in São Paulo and was urged to seek better treatment in his homeland if he wished to survive. Candia returned to his work in Brazil a month later after heading back home for treatment. In 1982 he founded the Fondazione Candia to keep his work alive. During his time in Brazil he became known as the "Doctor Schweitzer of the Amazon" and in 1980 met Pope John Paul II after the latter visited his leper hospital. He collapsed due to ill health in May 1983 prompting plans for him to go to Milan for treatment.

=== Illness and death ===
He left Belem for his homeland on 10 August 1983 knowing he would die there but wanted to get his health checked as well as to reconcile with his brother Riccardo with whom there were difficulties. But he fell ill on the plane and once he arrived at Charles de Gaulle Airport in Paris he collapsed and was rushed to the hospital. He was taken to the San Pio X Clinic in Milan on 11 August. The skin cancer soon metastasized to his liver causing liver cancer. He died on 31 August 1983 at 5:30 pm in the San Pio X Clinic in Milan, and Cardinal Carlo Maria Martini presided over his funeral on 2 September. He had died from liver cancer and skin cancer as well as a related bone tumor over his right lung. His remains were later transferred on 6 April 2006 to the parish of the SS. Guardian Angels and were placed to the left side of the altar.

== Beatification cause ==
The beatification process opened under Pope John Paul II on 20 January 1990 after the Congregation for the Causes of Saints issued an edict declaring nihil obstat (no objections to the cause) and titling Candia as a Servant of God. Cardinal Carlo Maria Martini oversaw the diocesan phase of investigation in Milan from 12 January 1991 until its closure at a Mass on 8 February 1994; the C.C.S. validated the process on 15 December 1995.

The postulation then compiled a positio dossier which was submitted to the C.C.S. in 1998 for assessment. Theologians evaluated the dossier and voiced their assent for the cause on 8 March 2013 as did the cardinal and bishop members of the C.C.S. sometime in 2014. Pope Francis named Candia as Venerable on 8 July 2014 after promulgating a decree that confirmed that Candia had lived a model life of heroic virtue.

The current postulator for this cause is Dr. Francesca Consolini.
