= Young Bess (novel) =

1944 novel

- First edition
- Author: Margaret Irwin
- Language: English
- Genre: Historical
- Publisher: Chatto & Windus
- Publication date: 1944
- Publication place: United Kingdom
- Media type: Print
- Followed by: Elizabeth, Captive Princess

Young Bess is a 1944 historical novel by the British writer Margaret Irwin. It was the first of trilogy focusing on the life of Elizabeth I of England. It focuses on her years as a princess during the reign of her father Henry VIII. It was followed by two sequels, Elizabeth, Captive Princess (1948) and Elizabeth and the Prince of Spain (1953).

== Adaptation ==
In 1953 it was adapted into a Hollywood film of the same title directed by George Sidney and starring Jean Simmons, Stewart Granger, Deborah Kerr and Charles Laughton.
