= Margaret Irwin (novelist) =

English historical novelist

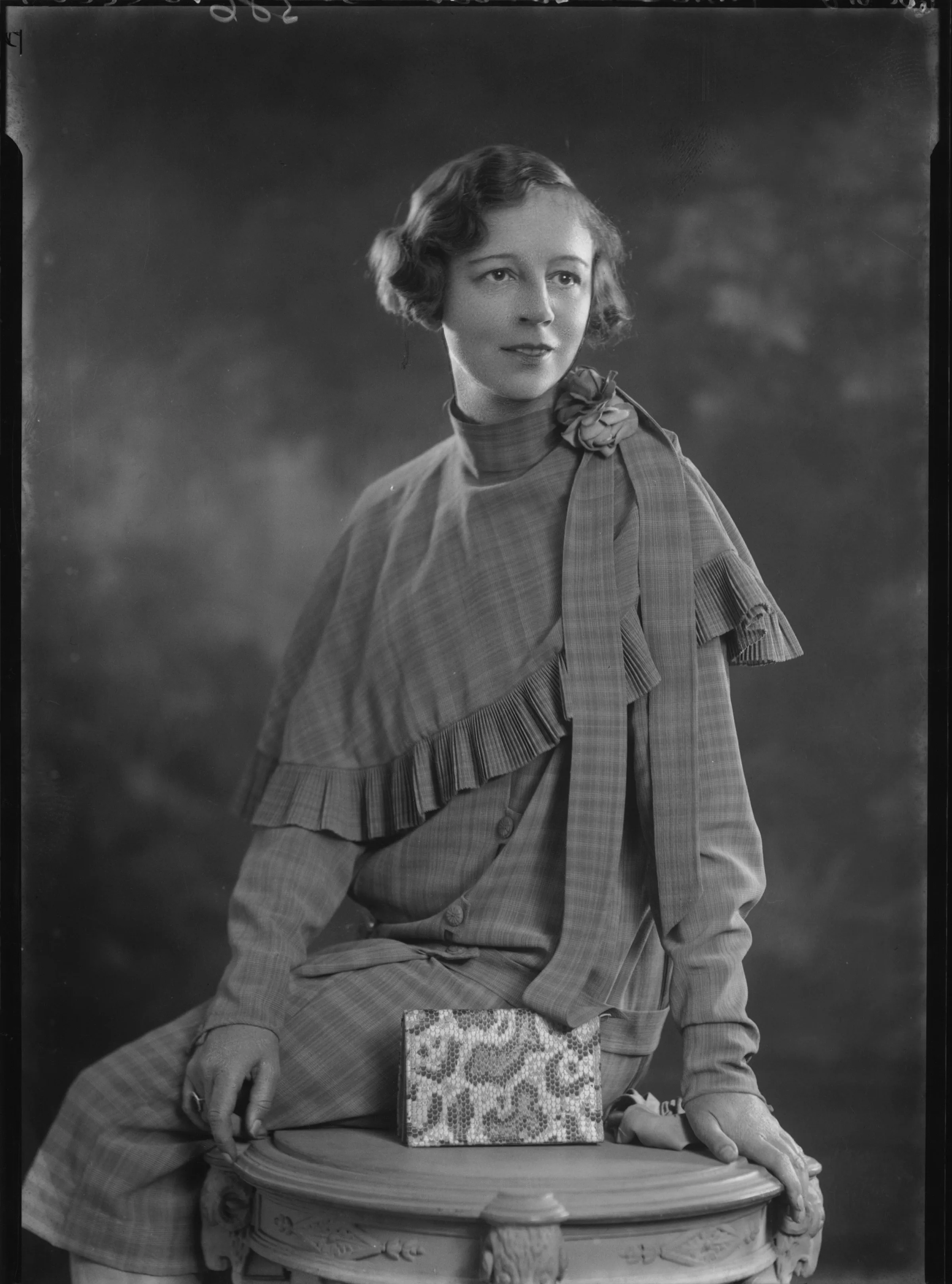
- Irwin in 1928
- Born: Margaret Emma Faith Irwin; 27 March 1889; London, England
- Died: 11 December 1967 (aged 78); London, England
- Occupation: Novelist
- Spouse: John Robert Monsell (m. 1929)
- Writing career
- Period: 1924-1967
- Genres: Historical, Biography, Horror
- Notable work: Young Bess

Margaret Emma Faith Irwin (27 March 1889 – 11 December 1967) was an English historical novelist. She also wrote a factual biography of Sir Walter Raleigh.

== Early life and education ==
Margaret was born in Highgate Hill, London. Her mother was Anna Julia Baker, daughter of Col. George Baker of 16th The Queen's Lancers, and she died in 1899. Her father Andrew Clarke Irwin, an East India Merchant. Andrew was born in 1846 in Perth, Western Australia, while his father Frederick Chidley was commandant of the Western Australian Forces. Andrew died 1902 in Edmonton, Middlesex, England. Anna and Andrew were married in 1875 in India.

Margaret was brought up by her uncle S. T. Irwin (Sidney Thomas Irwin), a master of Classics at Clifton College, then a boys' school. Sidney died in 1911. Margaret attended the nearby Clifton High School, a girls' school, in Bristol, after her parents died. She was educated at Clifton and at Oxford University, where she took a degree in English.

== Career ==
She began writing books and short stories in her early twenties. In 1929 she married children's author and illustrator John Robert Monsell, who created the covers for some of her books.

Her novels were esteemed for the accuracy of their historical research, and she became a noted authority on the Elizabethan and early Stuart era. Young Bess, a novel about the early years of Queen Elizabeth I, was made into a film of the same title starring Jean Simmons.

Irwin wrote several ghost stories (including "The Book" and "The Earlier Service"). Irwin also wrote two fantasy novels: Still She Wished for Company is about a magical time slip, and These Mortals is an adult fairy tale about a wizard's daughter.

== Bibliography ==
=== Single novels ===
- How Many Miles to Babylon (1913)
- Come Out to Play (1914)
- Out of the House (1916)
- Still She Wished for Company (1924); alternate title: Who Will Remember?, New York: T. Seltzer, 1924
- These Mortals (1925)
- Knock Four Times (1927)
- Fire Down Below (1928)
- None So Pretty: Or, the Story of Mr. Cork (1930)
- Royal Flush (1932)
- The Stranger Prince: The Story of Rupert of the Rhine (1938)
- The Bride: The Story of Louise and Montrose (1939)
- The Gay Galliard: The Story of Mary Queen of Scots (1941), later published as The Galliard
- Royal Flush: The Story of Minette (1948)
- The Proud Servant: A Story of Montrose (1949)

=== Queen Elizabeth Trilogy ===
- Young Bess (1944)
- Elizabeth, Captive Princess (1948)
- Elizabeth and the Prince of Spain (1953)

=== Short stories ===
- Madame Fears the Dark: Seven Stories and a Play (1935)
- Mrs. Oliver Cromwell and Other Stories (Chatto & Windus, London, 1940)
- Monsieur Seeks a Wife (1951)
- Bloodstock and Other Stories (1953)

=== Biography ===
- The Gay Galliard: The Love Story of Mary Queen of Scots (1942)
- That Great Lucifer: A Portrait of Sir Walter Raleigh (1960)

== Film adaptations ==
- Young Bess (1953), an adaptation of the book of the same title and Elizabeth, Captive Princess
- The Doughty Plot (1962), an episode of the television series Sir Francis Drake adapted from her own story and screenplay, co-written by Margaret Irwin
