= Young Bess =

1953 film by George Sidney

- Lobby card
- Directed by: George Sidney
- Written by: Jan Lustig; Arthur Wimperis
- Based on: Young Bess; 1944 novel by Margaret Irwin
- Produced by: Sidney Franklin
- Starring: Jean Simmons; Stewart Granger; Deborah Kerr; Charles Laughton
- Cinematography: Charles Rosher
- Edited by: Ralph E. Winters
- Music by: Miklós Rózsa
- Color process: Technicolor
- Production company: Metro-Goldwyn-Mayer
- Distributed by: Loew's Inc.
- Release dates: May 21, 1953 (Radio City Music Hall); May 29, 1953 (US)
- Running time: 112 minutes
- Country: United States
- Language: English
- Budget: $2,423,000
- Box office: $4,095,000

Young Bess is a 1953 Technicolor biographical film made by Metro-Goldwyn-Mayer about the early life of Elizabeth I, from her turbulent childhood to the eve of her accession to the throne of England. It stars Jean Simmons as Elizabeth and Stewart Granger as Thomas Seymour, with Charles Laughton as Elizabeth's father, Henry VIII, a part he had played 20 years before in The Private Life of Henry VIII. The film was directed by George Sidney and produced by Sidney Franklin, from a screenplay by Jan Lustig and Arthur Wimperis based on the novel of the same title by Margaret Irwin (1944).

== Plot ==
Following the execution of Princess Elizabeth's mother, Queen Anne Boleyn, for infidelity, King Henry VIII declares his daughter illegitimate, removes her from the line of succession to the throne, and exiles her to Hatfield House. Joining her in Hatfield are her loyal servants, governess Mistress Ashley and Mr. Parry. Over the years, her position rises and falls according to the whims of her father. The child is periodically summoned to return to London to become acquainted with Henry's latest spouse.

When Henry marries his last wife, Catherine Parr, the now-teenage Elizabeth rebels against her latest summons but is persuaded by the handsome, tactful Lord Admiral Thomas Seymour to change her mind. She and Katherine become good friends. Henry is impressed and amused by the resolute defiance of his daughter, and he declares her once again a legitimate heiress to the crown.

When Henry dies, Thomas's scheming brother Ned takes over as Lord Protector and guardian of the child king Edward VI, Elizabeth's half-brother, overriding Henry's dying wish that Thomas raise the boy. Ned's fear of his brother's ambition grows with each of Thomas's naval triumphs. In the meantime, Elizabeth realizes she is in love with Thomas, but graciously persuades Edward to issue a royal decree sanctioning the marriage of Thomas and Katherine. Despite the union, Thomas grows close to Elizabeth without realizing it until he witnesses Elizabeth being kissed by Barnaby, a courtier. Prompted by jealousy, Thomas kisses Elizabeth, who declares her love for him. Katherine, who has noticed the closeness between her husband and Elizabeth, asks Elizabeth to make a choice, and the princess moves back to Hatfield. Soon after, Katherine sickens and dies.

After months away at sea, Thomas returns and finally sees Elizabeth. Ned has him arrested and charged with treason. He also accuses Elizabeth of plotting with Thomas to overthrow her brother. She goes to see Edward, but is too late to save Thomas from execution. The film then shifts forward to 1558. Having survived the perils of her early life, and with Edward deceased and her elder sister Mary I dying, Elizabeth is about to become Queen of England.

== Cast ==
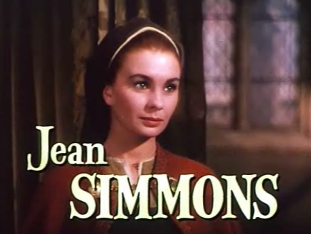
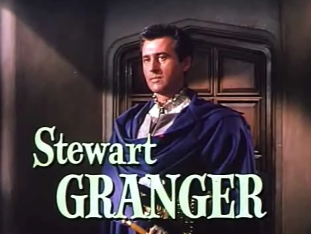
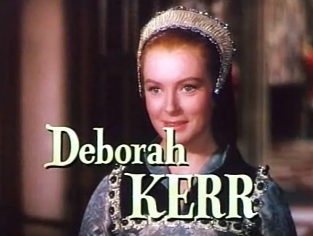
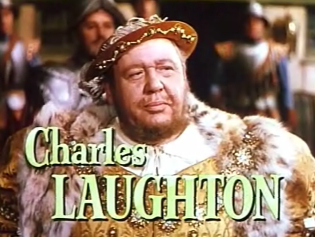

- Jean Simmons as Young Bess (Elizabeth I)
- Stewart Granger as Thomas Seymour
- Deborah Kerr as Katherine Parr
- Charles Laughton as Henry VIII
- Kay Walsh as Mrs. Ashley
- Guy Rolfe as Edward "Ned" Seymour
- Kathleen Byron as Anne Seymour, Ned's Wife
- Cecil Kellaway as Mr. Parry
- Rex Thompson as Young Prince Edward / King Edward VI
- Robert Arthur as Barnaby Fitzpatrick, Thomas's Page
- Leo G. Carroll as Mr. Mums, Elizabeth's Tutor
- Norma Varden as Lady Tyrwhitt
- Alan Napier as Robert Tyrwhitt
- Noreen Corcoran as Bess As A Child
- Ivan Triesault as Danish Envoy
- Elaine Stewart as Anne Boleyn
- Dawn Addams as Katherine Howard
- Doris Lloyd as Mother Jack
- Lumsden Hare as Archbishop Thomas Cranmer
- Lester Matthews as Sir William Paget
- Ann Tyrrell as Mary

== Production ==
=== Original novel ===
The novel was published in 1944 in Britain and in 1945 in the U.S. It became a best seller.

=== Development ===
MGM bought the rights to the novel in February 1945. Katherine Anne Porter and Jan Lustig signed to write the script, and Sidney Franklin was producer. Eventually a script by Lustig and Arthur Wimperis was finished in 1946 and Franklin said "we were full of enthusiasm for it." In May 1947, Deborah Kerr was tested for the lead role.

In March 1948, MGM announced it would make the film in Britain. It was to be the second in a series of films made there, following Edward, My Son. In May 1948, MGM stated that Deborah Kerr and Errol Flynn were "definite" for the film. However filming did not proceed.

In August 1948, Walter Pidgeon and Janet Leigh reportedly were tested for lead roles. Elizabeth Taylor was considered for the title role as was Deborah Kerr (if it was going to be the latter the character would be aged up). In November 1948, MGM put the film on its schedule for the following year. However, filming kept being postponed. In April 1949, MGM announced it was negotiating a contract with James Mason, whom it wanted to put in Young Bess and Robinson Crusoe.

In December 1950, Jean Simmons emerged as a favorite to play the title role. This was partly at the behest of J. Arthur Rank who had Simmons under contract and thought the role would be perfect for her. In February 1951, MGM announced Simmons would co-star with her husband Stewart Granger. Filming continued to be pushed back in part because Simmons became enmeshed in a contractual dispute with Howard Hughes. In October 1951, Charles Laughton signed to play Henry VIII. In August 1952, Deborah Kerr joined the cast as Katherine Parr.

=== Filming ===
Filming took place in Hollywood starting in October 1952. Producer Sidney Franklin said:

We're telling an intimate story against a background of sixteenth century court life, as opposed to a historical pageant about royal intrigues. We feel the love story between the Princess and Seymour – actually he was 25 years older than Elizabeth – will be more valid to audiences than a lot of historical detail which has no relation to our customers lives.

The musical score was composed by Miklós Rózsa, who was becoming known for his research on historical subjects. It incorporates tunes from the Fitzwilliam Virginal Book and other Tudor sources.

== Reception ==
Contemporary reviews were positive. A. H. Weiler of The New York Times wrote in a favorable review that "if faint strains of soap opera occasionally filter through the pomp and circumstance, Elizabeth of England and some of the storied figures who crowd this beautiful Technicolored tapestry, emerge as human beings." Variety called it "a remarkably engrossing motion picture" and "a human story, sensitively written, directed and played." "A strong romantic costume drama", declared Harrison's Reports. "The direction is faultless, the production values lavish, and the color photography exquisite." John McCarten of The New Yorker wrote that the plot "may sound like a Madison Avenue concept of history, but as directed by George Sidney, the piece doesn't churn up too much sudsy bathos to be intolerable, and, indeed, the cast goes about its work with such sincerity that you can enjoy the thing as a handsome costume exercise even though you're skeptical about Miss Irwin's history."

The film was Stewart Granger's favourite of all the movies he made for MGM "for the costumes, the cast, the story."

=== Box office ===
According to MGM records, the film earned $1,645,000 in North America and $2,450,000 in other markets, leading to a loss of $272,000.

In France, the film recorded admissions of 1,465,207.

== Awards ==
The film was nominated for two Academy Awards: for Best Costume Design and Best Art Direction (Cedric Gibbons, Urie McCleary, Edwin B. Willis, Jack D. Moore).

== See also ==
- Anne Boleyn in popular culture
