= Ann Tyrrell =

American actress (1909–1983)

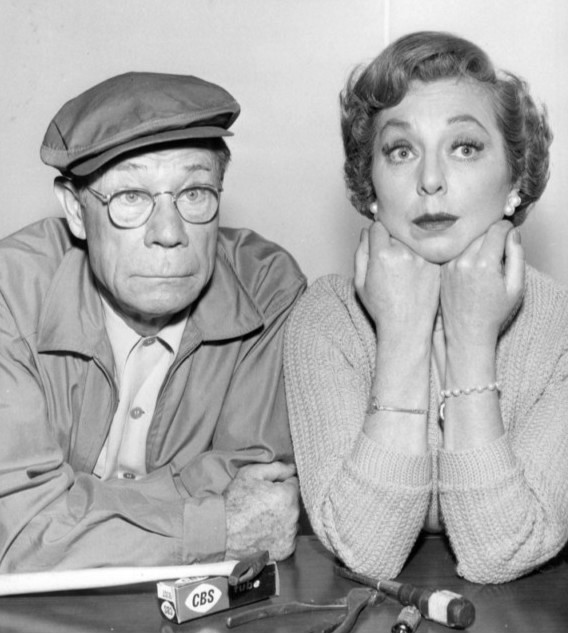
- Tyrrell with guest star Joe E. Brown on The Ann Sothern Show (1960)
- Born: February 6, 1909; Whatcom County, Washington, U.S.
- Died: July 20, 1983 (aged 74); Pasadena, California, U.S.
- Other name: Ann Tyrell
- Occupation: Actress
- Years active: 1949–1964

Ann Tyrrell (February 6, 1909 – July 20, 1983) was an American stage, film and television actress. Tyrrell is best known for her roles in both of the Ann Sothern CBS sitcoms Private Secretary (1953–1957) and The Ann Sothern Show (1958–1961).

== Career ==
A native of Whatcom County in northwestern Washington state, Tyrrell won her first film role in 1949 at the age of forty as Miss Swanson in Bride for Sale.

In 1953, she appeared unbilled as Mary Tudor sister of Queen Elizabeth I in the Metro-Goldwyn-Mayer (MGM) historical drama Queen Bess and in 1955, she appeared in the film Seven Angry Men with Raymond Massey and Jeffrey Hunter. Between film appearances, Tyrrell guest-starred in episodes of Adventures of Superman, The Adventures of Kit Carson, and The People's Choice.

== Later years ==
After retiring from acting, Tyrrell worked as a dialectician and made recordings for the blind.

Tyrrell made her final public appearance in a phone interview on the ABC morning program Good Morning America in November 1982. In that installment, host Joan Lunden interviewed on camera the cast of both Private Secretary and The Ann Sothern Show which included Sothern, Don Porter, and Jesse White. Tyrrell was not able to join them in person, but she was able to converse with Lunden and reminisce with her former co-stars via telephone from her home in California.

== Death ==
On July 20, 1983, Tyrrell died of a heart attack at a Pasadena, California, hospital at the age of 74.

== Filmography ==
Film
Year	Title	Role	Notes
1949	Bride for Sale	Miss Swanson	
1950	Mother Didn't Tell Me	Mrs. Jones	Uncredited
1950	Appointment with Danger	Gary Postmaster's Secretary	Uncredited
1950	Caged	Edna	Uncredited
1950	Once a Thief	Dr. Borden	
1950	Kiss Tomorrow Goodbye	Miss Staines	Uncredited
1950	No Way Out	Nurse	Uncredited
1950	Bunco Squad	Miss Dilby	Uncredited
1950	The Glass Menagerie	Clerk	
1950	Emergency Wedding	Miss Neilson	Uncredited
1950	Father's Wild Game	Tilda	
1951	Gasoline Alley	Miss Ent	Uncredited
1951	Bedtime for Bonzo	Telephone Operator	
1951	Cry Danger	Woman in Apt. #201	Uncredited
1951	Up Front	Nurse	Uncredited
1951	My True Story	Sophie	
1951	As Young as You Feel	Cleveland's secretary	Uncredited
1952	Love Is Better Than Ever	Mrs. Whitney	Uncredited
1952	Paula	Nurse Receptionist	Uncredited
1952	The Girl in White	Nurse Bigley	Alternative title: So Bright the Flame
1952	The Sellout	Mrs. Jennie Nova Amboy	Uncredited
1952	Holiday for Sinners	Minor Role	Uncredited
1952	Because of You	Nurse	Uncredited
1953	Julius Caesar	Citizen of Rome #5	
1953	Young Bess	Mary	Uncredited
1953	Take Me to Town	Louise Pickett	
1953	Half a Hero	Neighbor in Village	Uncredited
1954	Executive Suite	Miss Nordley	Uncredited
1954	Lucky Me	Fortune Teller	Uncredited
1955	Seven Angry Men	Mrs. Mary Brown	Alternative title: God's Angry Men
1955	Good Morning, Miss Dove	Mrs. Makepeace	Uncredited

Television
Year	Title	Role	Notes
1952	The Unexpected	Fortune Teller	Episode: "Lifeline"
1952	Adventures of Superman	Miss Walton	Episode: "The Deserted Village"
1952–1953	The Adventures of Kit Carson	Various roles	3 episodes
1954	Schlitz Playhouse		Episode: "The Best of Everything"
1954–1957	Private Secretary	Violet "Vi" Praskins	Series regular
1955	Soldiers of Fortune	Mrs. Anderson	Episode: "Drums of Far Island"
1955	Jane Wyman Presents The Fireside Theatre	Nurse Hanson	Episode: "The Key"
1958	The People's Choice	Emma	Episode: "Missing Moolah"
1958–1961	The Ann Sothern Show	Olive Smith	Series regular
1962	The Danny Thomas Show	Mrs. Marshall	Episode: "Casanova Tonoose"
1964	Burke's Law	Miss Ruth Potter	Episode: "Who Killed the Paper Dragon?", (final appearance)
