= List of films set in New York City =

In the American cinema history, many films have been set in New York City, or a fictionalized version thereof.

The following is a list of films and documentaries set in New York, however the list includes a number of films which only have a tenuous connection to the city. The list is sorted by the year the film was released.

== 1900s ==
- What Happened on Twenty-third Street, New York City (1901)
- Electrocuting an Elephant (1903)
- Coney Island at Night (1905)
- The Thieving Hand (1908)

== 1910s ==
- Regeneration (1915)
- Lights of New York (1916)
- Coney Island (1917)
- The Immigrant (1917)
- The Delicious Little Devil (1919)

== 1920s ==
- The Saphead (1920)
- Manhatta (1921)
- Manhandled (1924)
- The Rag Man (1925)
- Subway Sadie (1926)
- East Side, West Side (1927)
- The Jazz Singer (1927)
- Lights of New York (1928)
- The Cameraman (1928) (has a Scene at Coney Island)
- The Crowd (1928) (has a Scene at Coney Island)
- Speedy (1928) (has a Scene at Coney Island)
- Lonesome (1928) (has a Scene at Coney Island)
- Applause (1929)
- The Broadway Melody (1929)
- Gold Diggers of Broadway (1929)

== 1930s ==
- The Divorcee (1930)
- Reaching for the Moon (1930)
- Street Scene (1931)
- Sidewalks of New York (1931)
- Central Park (1932)
- The Heart of New York (1932)
- Lawyer Man (1932)
- Pack Up Your Troubles (1932)
- 42nd Street (1933)
- The Bowery (1933)
- Dancing Lady (1933)
- Deluge (1933)
- Dinner at Eight (1933)
- Footlight Parade (1933)
- Gold Diggers of 1933 (1933)
- Hallelujah, I'm a Bum (1933)
- Hold Your Man (1933)
- The House on 56th Street (1933)
- King Kong (1933)
- Lady for a Day (1933)
- Little Women (1933)
- Son of Kong (1933)
- It Happened One Night (1934)
- Manhattan Melodrama (1934)
- The Thin Man (1934)
- Annie Oakley (1935)
- Dangerous (1935)
- If You Could Only Cook (1935)
- A Night at the Opera (1935)
- Romance in Manhattan (1935)
- Adventure in Manhattan (1936)
- The Great Ziegfeld (1936)
- Libeled Lady (1936)
- Mr. Deeds Goes to Town (1936)
- My Man Godfrey (1936)
- Dead End (1937)
- Nothing Sacred (1937)
- The Toast of New York (1937)
- Topper (1937)
- Just Around the Corner (1938)
- Professor Beware (1938)
- There Goes My Heart (1938)
- You Can't Take It with You (1938)
- The Rage of Paris (1938)
- 5th Ave Girl (1939)
- Bachelor Mother (1939)
- Dark Victory (1939)
- Rose of Washington Square (1939)
- Streets of New York (1939)
- Topper Takes a Trip (1939)
- The Women (1939)

== 1940s ==
- Beyond Tomorrow (1940)
- City for Conquest (1940)
- Edison the Man (1940)
- I Love You Again (1940)
- Lillian Russell (1940)
- Little Nellie Kelly (1940)
- Remember the Night (1940)
- Babes on Broadway (1941)
- Citizen Kane (1941)
- The Devil and Miss Jones (1941)
- Here Comes Mr. Jordan (1941)
- Mr. Bug Goes to Town (1941)
- Mr. & Mrs. Smith (1941)
- The Strawberry Blonde (1941)
- Ziegfeld Girl (1941)
- Cat People (1942)
- Grand Central Murder (1942)
- Holiday Inn (1942)
- The Pride of the Yankees (1942)
- Saboteur (1942)
- Tales of Manhattan (1942)
- Tarzan's New York Adventure (1942)
- Woman of the Year (1942)
- Yankee Doodle Dandy (1942)
- Heaven Can Wait (1943)
- The Seventh Victim (1943)
- Arsenic and Old Lace (1944)
- Bowery to Broadway (1944)
- Buffalo Bill (1944)
- Cover Girl (1944)
- Going My Way (1944)
- The Hairy Ape (1944)
- Laura (1944)
- The Bells of St. Mary's (1945)
- Christmas in Connecticut (1945)
- The Clock (1945)
- The House on 92nd Street (1945)
- The Lost Weekend (1945)
- Scarlet Street (1945)
- A Tree Grows in Brooklyn (1945)
- Week-End at the Waldorf (1945)
- The Brute Man (1946)
- The Dark Corner (1946)
- Deception (1946)
- House of Horrors (1946)
- The Locket (1946)
- The Bishop's Wife (1947)
- Boomerang! (1947)
- A Double Life (1947)
- Down to Earth (1947)
- Gentleman's Agreement (1947)
- It Happened in Brooklyn (1947)
- Kiss of Death (1947)
- The Lady from Shanghai (1947)
- Life with Father (1947)
- Miracle on 34th Street (1947)
- Out of the Blue (1947)
- Boarding House Blues (1948)
- Cry of the City (1948)
- Easter Parade (1948)
- Force of Evil (1948)
- In the Street (1948)
- Mr. Blandings Builds His Dream House (1948)
- My Girl Tisa (1948)
- The Naked City (1948)
- Portrait of Jennie (1948)
- Rope (1948)
- Sorry, Wrong Number (1948)
- Up in Central Park (1948)
- Winter Meeting (1948)
- Adam's Rib (1949)
- C-Man (1949)
- City Across the River (1949)
- East Side, West Side (1949)
- The Heiress (1949)
- Holiday Affair (1949)
- Jigsaw (1949)
- Little Women (1949)
- My Friend Irma (1949)
- On the Town (1949)
- Port of New York (1949)
- The Window (1949)

== 1950s ==
=== 1950 ===
- All About Eve (1950)
- Black Hand (1950)
- The Daughter of Rosie O'Grady (1950)
- The Great Jewel Robber (1950)
- Guilty Bystander (1950)
- The Killer That Stalked New York (1950)
- Mister 880 (1950)
- Side Street (1950)
- The Sleeping City (1950)
- So Young, So Bad (1950)
- The Tattooed Stranger (1950)
- Where the Sidewalk Ends (1950)

=== 1951 ===
- Detective Story
- Fourteen Hours
- I Can Get It for You Wholesale
- Love Nest
- Lullaby of Broadway
- The Model and the Marriage Broker
- The People Against O'Hara
- St. Benny the Dip
- Teresa
- When Worlds Collide

=== 1952 ===
- Anything Can Happen
- The Belle of New York
- Captive Women
- Don't Bother to Knock
- Dreamboat
- Invasion, U.S.A.
- Love Is Better Than Ever
- The Marrying Kind
- Million Dollar Mermaid
- O. Henry's Full House
- Park Row
- The Story of Will Rogers
- The Thief

=== 1953 ===
- 99 River Street
- The Beast from 20,000 Fathoms
- Daybreak Express
- Dream Wife
- Francis Covers the Big Town
- The Glass Wall
- Houdini
- House of Wax
- How to Marry a Millionaire
- I Love Melvin
- Little Fugitive
- Main Street to Broadway
- The Moon Is Blue
- Pickup on South Street

=== 1954 ===
- About Mrs. Leslie
- Black Widow
- The Country Girl
- Executive Suite
- The Glenn Miller Story
- It Should Happen to You
- Living It Up
- On the Waterfront
- Phffft
- Rear Window
- Sabrina
- Witness to Murder
- Woman's World

=== 1955 ===
- Artists and Models
- Blackboard Jungle
- Daddy Long Legs
- Guys and Dolls
- Killer's Kiss
- Marty
- My Sister Eileen
- The Naked Street
- New York Confidential
- The Seven Little Foys
- The Seven Year Itch
- The Shrike

=== 1956 ===
- Bundle of Joy
- The Catered Affair
- The Great Man
- The Harder They Fall
- Lovers and Lollipops
- The Man in the Gray Flannel Suit
- Miracle in the Rain
- The Opposite Sex
- Patterns
- The Solid Gold Cadillac
- The Wrong Man

=== 1957 ===
- 12 Angry Men
- An Affair to Remember
- The Bachelor Party
- Beau James
- Designing Woman
- Desk Set
- Edge of the City
- A Face in the Crowd
- Funny Face
- The Garment Jungle
- The Giant Claw
- A Hatful of Rain
- A King in New York
- Man of a Thousand Faces
- N.Y., N.Y.
- On the Bowery
- Slaughter on Tenth Avenue
- Sweet Smell of Success

=== 1958 ===
- Bell, Book and Candle
- The Colossus of New York
- Cop Hater
- I Married a Woman
- Marjorie Morningstar
- The Matchmaker
- Stage Struck

=== 1959 ===
- Ask Any Girl
- The Best of Everything
- The Five Pennies
- The Gazebo
- Imitation of Life
- It Happened to Jane
- The Last Angry Man
- Middle of the Night
- The Mouse That Roared
- North by Northwest
- Odds Against Tomorrow
- Pillow Talk
- Shadows
- That Kind of Woman
- The World, the Flesh and the Devil
- Two Men in Manhattan

== 1960s ==
=== 1960 ===
- All the Fine Young Cannibals
- The Apartment
- Bells Are Ringing
- Butterfield 8
- From the Terrace
- Let's Make Love
- Murder, Inc.
- Pay or Die
- Weddings and Babies

=== 1961 ===
- Blast of Silence
- Breakfast at Tiffany's
- A Cold Wind in August
- The Connection
- The Hustler
- Lover Come Back
- Madison Avenue
- Pocketful of Miracles
- Portrait of a Mobster
- Something Wild
- West Side Story
- The Young Savages

=== 1962 ===
- Boys' Night Out
- If a Man Answers
- The Manchurian Candidate
- Requiem for a Heavyweight
- Satan in High Heels
- That Touch of Mink
- Two for the Seesaw

=== 1963 ===
- An Affair of the Skin
- America, America
- Call Me Bwana
- Come Blow Your Horn
- The Cool World
- Critic's Choice
- Homesick for St. Pauli
- Love with the Proper Stranger
- Mary, Mary
- The Mouse on the Moon
- Scorpio Rising
- Sunday in New York
- Twice a Man
- What's a Nice Girl Like You Doing in a Place Like This?
- The Wheeler Dealers

=== 1964 ===
- Dear Heart
- Empire
- Fail Safe
- A Global Affair
- A House Is Not a Home
- Marnie
- The Pawnbroker
- The Troublemaker
- The World of Henry Orient

=== 1965 ===
- Andy
- Bad Girls Go to Hell
- How to Murder Your Wife
- Mirage
- Promise Her Anything
- A Thousand Clowns
- Three Rooms in Manhattan
- Who Killed Teddy Bear

=== 1966 ===
- Any Wednesday
- Chelsea Girls
- Dutchman
- A Fine Madness
- The Group
- A Man Called Adam
- Mister Buddwing
- Penelope
- Seconds
- You're a Big Boy Now

=== 1967 ===
- Barefoot in the Park
- David Holzman's Diary
- Enter Laughing
- Fitzwilly
- Games
- How to Succeed in Business Without Really Trying
- In Like Flint
- The Incident
- The President's Analyst
- The Producers
- The Tiger Makes Out
- Up the Down Staircase
- Valley of the Dolls
- Wait Until Dark
- Wavelength
- Way Out
- Who's That Knocking at My Door

=== 1968 ===
- Andy Warhol's Flesh
- Bye Bye Braverman
- Candy
- Confessions of a Psycho Cat
- Coogan's Bluff
- Destroy All Monsters
- The Detective
- For Love of Ivy
- Funny Girl
- Greetings
- A Lovely Way to Die
- Madigan
- Mingus: Charlie Mingus 1968
- The Night They Raided Minsky's
- No Way To Treat A Lady
- The Odd Couple
- P.J.
- Planet of the Apes
- Rosemary's Baby
- The Secret Life of an American Wife
- The Subject Was Roses
- Sweet November
- Symbiopsychotaxiplasm
- What's So Bad About Feeling Good?
- Where Were You When the Lights Went Out?

=== 1969 ===
- Alice's Restaurant
- The April Fools
- The Arrangement
- Cactus Flower
- Change of Habit
- Coming Apart
- Generation
- Gidget Grows Up
- Hello, Dolly!
- John and Mary
- Me, Natalie
- Midnight Cowboy
- Popi
- Putney Swope
- Some Kind of a Nut
- Sweet Charity
- The Thirteen Chairs
- Topaz
- Trilogy
- Turn On to Love

== 1970s ==
=== 1970 ===
- The Adventurers
- Andy Warhol's Trash
- The Angel Levine
- Beneath the Planet of the Apes
- The Boys in the Band
- Cotton Comes to Harlem
- The Cross and the Switchblade
- Diary of a Mad Housewife
- Hercules in New York
- Hi, Mom!
- Hospital
- Husbands
- I Never Sang for My Father
- Jenny
- Joe
- The Landlord
- Love Story
- Lovers and Other Strangers
- Loving
- The Magic Garden of Stanley Sweetheart
- Move
- On a Clear Day You Can See Forever
- The Out-of-Towners
- The Owl and the Pussycat
- The Projectionist
- Puzzle of a Downfall Child
- Shinbone Alley
- The Sidelong Glances of a Pigeon Kicker
- Where's Poppa?

=== 1971 ===
- The Anderson Tapes
- B.S. I Love You
- Bananas
- Believe in Me
- Born to Win
- Carnal Knowledge
- Cry Uncle!
- Desperate Characters
- The French Connection
- The Gang That Couldn't Shoot Straight
- The Hospital
- Jennifer on My Mind
- Klute
- Lady Liberty
- Little Murders
- The Love Machine
- Made for Each Other
- A New Leaf
- The Panic in Needle Park
- Plaza Suite
- The Pursuit Of Happiness
- A Safe Place
- Shaft
- Some of My Best Friends Are...
- Such Good Friends
- Taking Off
- The Telephone Book
- They Might Be Giants
- Who Is Harry Kellerman and Why Is He Saying Those Terrible Things About Me?
- Who Killed Mary What's 'Er Name?
- Who Says I Can't Ride a Rainbow!
- You've Got to Walk It Like You Talk It or You'll Lose That Beat

=== 1972 ===
- Across 110th Street
- Ciao! Manhattan
- Come Back, Charleston Blue
- A Fan's Notes
- Fritz the Cat
- The Godfather
- The Heartbreak Kid
- The Hot Rock
- Hotel Monterey
- Lady Sings the Blues
- The Last House on the Left
- Last of the Red Hot Lovers
- Portnoy's Complaint
- The Possession of Joel Delaney
- Rivals
- Shaft's Big Score
- Super Fly
- To Find a Man
- Up the Sandbox
- The Valachi Papers
- The War Between Men and Women

=== 1973 ===
- 40 Carats
- Badge 373
- Bang the Drum Slowly
- Black Caesar
- Cops and Robbers
- The Exorcist
- From the Mixed-Up Files of Mrs. Basil E. Frankweiler
- Ganja & Hess
- Godspell
- Gordon's War
- Heavy Traffic
- Hell Up in Harlem
- Hurry Up, or I'll Be 30
- Jeremy
- The Last Detail
- Live and Let Die
- Massage Parlor Murders
- Mean Streets
- Miracle on 34th Street
- No Place to Hide
- Serpico
- The Seven-Ups
- Shamus
- Sisters
- Soylent Green
- The Stone Killer
- Summer Wishes, Winter Dreams
- The Way We Were
- Willie Dynamite

=== 1974 ===
- Alice in the Cities
- Claudine
- Crazy Joe
- Death Wish
- The Education of Sonny Carson
- For Pete's Sake
- The Gambler
- The Godfather Part II
- Harry and Tonto
- Italianamerican
- Law and Disorder
- The Lords of Flatbush
- Mame
- The Sister-in-Law
- The Super Cops
- The Taking of Pelham One Two Three

=== 1975 ===
- Aaron Loves Angela
- Coonskin
- Deadly Hero
- Dog Day Afternoon
- Funny Lady
- The Happy Hooker
- Hester Street
- The Man in the Glass Booth
- The Night That Panicked America
- Once Is Not Enough
- Organism
- The Prisoner of Second Avenue
- Report to the Commissioner
- Sheila Levine Is Dead and Living in New York
- The Sunshine Boys
- Three Days of the Condor

=== 1976 ===
- The Front
- God Told Me To
- Harry and Walter Go to New York
- King Kong
- Marathon Man
- Network
- The Next Man
- Next Stop, Greenwich Village
- Not a Pretty Picture
- The Ritz
- Taxi Driver

=== 1977 ===
- Andy Warhol's Bad
- Annie Hall
- Audrey Rose
- Contract on Cherry Street
- Emanuelle in America
- End of the World
- Exorcist II: The Heretic
- The Goodbye Girl
- Heroes
- Looking for Mr. Goodbar
- New York City
- News from Home
- Opening Night
- The Rescuers
- Roseland
- Saturday Night Fever
- The Sentinel
- Short Eyes
- Sorcerer
- Thieves
- The Turning Point

=== 1978 ===
- American Hot Wax
- Black Box
- Bloodbrothers
- Bye Bye Monkey
- A Dream Is What You Wake Up From
- Eyes of Laura Mars
- Fingers
- Flaming Hearts
- Girlfriends
- The Greek Tycoon
- How to Pick Up Girls!
- I Wanna Hold Your Hand
- If Ever I See You Again
- Interiors
- King of the Gypsies
- Matilda
- Oliver's Story
- The One and Only
- Paradise Alley
- Rush It
- Slow Dancing in the Big City
- Somebody Killed Her Husband
- Superman
- An Unmarried Woman
- The Wiz

=== 1979 ===
- All That Jazz
- The Bell Jar
- Bloodrage
- Boardwalk
- Chapter Two
- The Driller Killer
- El Super
- From Corleone to Brooklyn
- Going in Style
- Hair
- The in Laws
- Kramer vs. Kramer
- Last Embrace
- Love at First Bite
- Manhattan
- Meteor
- Natural Enemies
- Nocturna: Granddaughter of Dracula
- Rich Kids
- The Rose
- Something Short of Paradise
- The Wanderers
- The Warriors
- Zombi 2

== 1980s ==
=== 1980 ===
- Blank Generation
- Can't Stop the Music
- Cannibal Holocaust
- City of the Living Dead
- Contamination
- Cruising
- Defiance
- The Dogs of War
- Dressed to Kill
- The Exterminator
- Falling in Love Again
- Fame
- Fatso
- The First Deadly Sin
- Gloria
- He Knows You're Alone
- Hero at Large
- Inferno
- It's My Turn
- The Jazz Singer
- Just Tell Me What You Want
- Love in a Taxi
- Maniac
- Night of the Juggler
- Permanent Vacation
- Personal Problems
- Raging Bull
- Raise the Titanic
- Stir Crazy
- Superman II
- Times Square
- Tribute
- Underground U.S.A.
- Willie & Phil
- Windows

=== 1981 ===
- American Pop
- Arthur
- Brooklyn Bridge
- The Chosen
- Endless Love
- Escape from New York
- Eyewitness
- The Fan
- Fort Apache, The Bronx
- The Four Seasons
- Ghost Story
- Heavy Metal
- The House by the Cemetery
- Huie's Sermon
- Model
- Modern Problems
- Ms. 45
- My Dinner with Andre
- Nighthawks
- Nightmare
- Only When I Laugh
- Paternity
- Prince of the City
- Ragtime
- Rich and Famous
- Rollover
- So Fine
- They All Laughed
- Vortex
- Wolfen

=== 1982 ===
- 1990: The Bronx Warriors
- Annie
- Author! Author!
- Basket Case
- The Clairvoyant
- Forty Deuce
- Hanky Panky
- Hey Good Lookin'
- I, the Jury
- I'm Dancing as Fast as I Can
- The King of Comedy
- Kiss Me Goodbye
- The Last Horror Film
- A Little Sex
- Losing Ground
- Manhattan Baby
- My Favorite Year
- The New York Ripper
- Night Shift
- Q
- Rocky III
- Six Weeks
- Smithereens
- Sophie's Choice
- Soup for One
- Still of the Night
- A Stranger Is Watching
- Tempest
- Tootsie
- The Verdict
- Vigilante
- Wrong Is Right

=== 1983 ===
- Angelo My Love
- Born in Flames
- Can She Bake a Cherry Pie?
- City News
- Copkiller
- Daniel
- Easy Money
- Enormous Changes at the Last Minute
- Escape from the Bronx
- Exposed
- The Hunger
- Liquid Sky
- Lovesick
- Murder Me, Murder You
- Of Unknown Origin
- Romantic Comedy
- Scarface
- Staying Alive
- Strange Invaders
- Style Wars
- The Survivors
- Trading Places
- Two of a Kind
- Variety
- Wild Style
- Without A Trace

=== 1984 ===
- Almost You
- Alphabet City
- Beat Street
- Body Rock
- Broadway Danny Rose
- The Brother From Another Planet
- C.H.U.D.
- The Cotton Club
- Delivery Boys
- Exterminator 2
- Falling in Love
- Fear City
- The Flamingo Kid
- Garbo Talks
- Ghostbusters
- Heartsounds
- Johnny Dangerously
- Klassenverhältnisse
- The Lonely Guy
- Mixed Blood
- More Than Murder
- Moscow on the Hudson
- The Muppets Take Manhattan
- Murder Rock
- The Natural
- Old Enough
- Once Upon a Time in America
- Over the Brooklyn Bridge
- Perfect Strangers
- The Pope of Greenwich Village
- Rhinestone
- Romancing the Stone
- Special Effects
- Splash
- Stranger Than Paradise
- Unfaithfully Yours

=== 1985 ===
- After Hours
- Brewster's Millions
- Cat's Eye
- A Chorus Line
- Crossover Dreams
- Deadly Messages
- Death Wish 3
- Desperately Seeking Susan
- Fast Forward
- Grace Quigley
- Harem
- Heaven Help Us
- Honeymoon
- Insignificance
- Krush Groove
- The Last Dragon
- Out of the Darkness
- Perfect
- Prizzi's Honor
- The Protector
- The Purple Rose of Cairo
- Rappin'
- Remo Williams: The Adventure Begins
- Santa Claus The Movie
- Sesame Street Presents: Follow That Bird
- The Statue of Liberty
- Streetwalkin'
- The Stuff
- Tenement
- Too Scared to Scream
- Turk 182!
- The Way It Is
- Year of the Dragon

=== 1986 ===
- 9½ Weeks
- An American Tail
- Apology
- Blood Ties
- Brighton Beach Memoirs
- The Children of Times Square
- Combat Shock
- "Crocodile" Dundee
- Crossroads
- Detective School Dropouts
- Eat and Run
- F/X
- Hannah and Her Sisters
- Heartburn
- Highlander
- Joey
- Jumpin' Jack Flash
- Legal Eagles
- Little Shop of Horrors
- The Money Pit
- No Picnic
- Off Beat
- The Park Is Mine
- Parting Glances
- Playing for Keeps
- Power
- Quiet Cool
- She's Gotta Have It
- Sid and Nancy
- Sleepwalk
- Something Wild
- Streets of Gold
- Working Girls

=== 1987 ===
- 84 Charing Cross Road
- Angel Heart
- An Autumn's Tale
- Baby Boom
- Batteries Not Included
- The Believers
- A Better Tomorrow II
- Beyond Therapy
- The Brave Little Toaster
- China Girl
- Critical Condition
- Dead of Winter
- Deadly Illusion
- Eddie Murphy Raw
- Enemy Territory
- Fatal Attraction
- Forever, Lulu
- Graveyard Shift
- Heart
- Hello Again
- I Love N.Y.
- Ishtar
- Kiss Daddy Goodnight
- Moonstruck
- Nuts
- Outrageous Fortune
- The Pick-Up Artist
- Planes, Trains and Automobiles
- Radio Days
- The Secret of My Success
- Someone to Watch Over Me
- The Squeeze
- Story of a Junkie
- Street Smart
- Street Trash
- Three Men and a Baby
- Wall Street
- Who's That Girl

=== 1988 ===
- Another Woman
- Arthur 2: On the Rocks
- Beaches
- Big
- Big Business
- The Boost
- Bright Lights, Big City
- Call Me
- Cocktail
- Coming to America
- Crocodile Dundee II
- Crossing Delancey
- Five Corners
- The House on Carroll Street
- Last Rites
- Maniac Cop
- Married to the Mob
- Me and Him
- A New Life
- Oliver & Company
- Punchline
- Scrooged
- Shakedown
- Short Circuit 2
- Slime City
- Spike of Bensonhurst
- Sticky Fingers
- Torch Song Trilogy
- Vibes
- Working Girl

=== 1989 ===
- American Stories: Food, Family and Philosophy
- Black Rain
- Communion
- Cookie
- Crimes and Misdemeanors
- Do the Right Thing
- The Dream Team
- Family Business
- Fear, Anxiety & Depression
- Friday the 13th Part VIII: Jason Takes Manhattan
- Fun Down There
- Ghostbusters II
- Harlem Nights
- The January Man
- Longtime Companion
- Look Who's Talking
- New York Stories
- Perdues dans New York
- The Phantom of the Opera
- Puppet Master
- Rooftops
- Sea of Love
- See No Evil, Hear No Evil
- Tap
- See You in the Morning
- She-Devil
- Sidewalk Stories
- Slaves of New York
- Snake Eater
- The Toxic Avenger Part II
- True Believer
- The Unbelievable Truth
- Vampire's Kiss
- When Harry Met Sally...
- Who Shot Pat?
- Weekend at Bernie's

== 1990s ==
=== 1990 ===
- Alice
- All the Vermeers in New York
- The Ambulance
- Betsy's Wedding
- Blue Steel
- The Bonfire of the Vanities
- Cadillac Man
- Come See the Paradise
- Crazy People
- Def by Temptation
- Frankenhooker
- The Freshman
- Funny About Love
- Ghost
- The Godfather Part III
- The Golden Boat
- Goodfellas
- Green Card
- Gremlins 2: The New Batch
- Jacob's Ladder
- Joe Versus the Volcano
- King of New York
- Last Exit to Brooklyn
- Look Who's Talking Too
- Loose Cannons
- Maniac Cop 2
- Metropolitan
- Misery
- Mo' Better Blues
- Paris Is Burning
- Q & A
- Quick Change
- The Rescuers Down Under
- Solar Crisis
- State of Grace
- Stella
- Teenage Mutant Ninja Turtles
- Three Men and a Little Lady
- Where the Heart Is

=== 1991 ===
- 29th Street
- Age Isn't Everything
- All I Want for Christmas
- An American Tail: Fievel Goes West
- Billy Bathgate
- The Butcher's Wife
- City Slickers
- Curly Sue
- Deceived
- Delirious
- F/X2
- The Fisher King
- Frankie and Johnny
- Hangin' with the Homeboys
- The Hard Way
- Jungle Fever
- The Linguini Incident
- Married to It
- Mobsters
- New Jack City
- Night on Earth
- One Good Cop
- Oscar
- Other People's Money
- Out for Justice
- The Prince of Tides
- Pushing Hands
- Queens Logic
- The Refrigerator
- Regarding Henry
- Shadows and Fog
- Soapdish
- Straight Out of Brooklyn
- Strictly Business
- The Super
- Talkin' Dirty After Dark
- Teenage Mutant Ninja Turtles II: The Secret of the Ooze
- What About Bob?

=== 1992 ===
- Bad Lieutenant
- Boomerang
- Broadway Bound
- Freejack
- Glengarry Glen Ross
- Hellraiser III: Hell on Earth
- Home Alone 2: Lost in New York
- Husbands and Wives
- In the Line of Duty: Street War
- In the Soup
- Juice
- Just Another Girl on the I.R.T.
- Laws of Gravity
- Light Sleeper
- Mac
- Malcolm X
- The Mambo Kings
- Me Myself & I
- Newsies
- Night and the City
- Scent of a Woman
- Single White Female
- A Stranger Among Us
- This Is My Life
- Used People
- Zebrahead

=== 1993 ===
- The Age of Innocence
- A Bronx Tale
- Carlito's Way
- Coneheads
- Even Cowgirls Get the Blues
- For Love or Money
- Freefall
- Last Action Hero
- Look Who's Talking Now
- Manhattan Murder Mystery
- Maniac Cop 3
- Naked in New York
- The Night We Never Met
- The Pickle
- Romeo Is Bleeding
- The Saint of Fort Washington
- Searching for Bobby Fischer
- Six Degrees of Separation
- Sleepless in Seattle
- Sliver
- Strapped
- Super Mario Bros.
- Teenage Mutant Ninja Turtles III
- The Wedding Banquet
- Weekend at Bernie's II
- We're Back! A Dinosaur's Story
- What's Love Got to Do with It
- Who's the Man?

=== 1994 ===
- Above The Rim
- Amateur
- Angie
- Bullets Over Broadway
- Car 54, Where Are You?
- The Cowboy Way
- Crooklyn
- Death Wish V: The Face of Death
- Fresh
- Fresh Kill
- Highlander III: The Sorcerer
- The Hudsucker Proxy
- I Like It Like That
- It Could Happen to You
- The Last Good Time
- The Last Seduction
- Léon: The Professional
- Little Women
- Love Affair
- Miracle on 34th Street
- Mrs. Parker and the Vicious Circle
- Nadja
- North
- The Paper
- Quiz Show
- Rhythm Thief
- The Scout
- The Search for One-eye Jimmy
- The Shadow
- The Stand
- Sugar Hill
- A Troll in Central Park
- Vanya on 42nd Street
- What Happened Was
- Wolf

=== 1995 ===
- The Addiction
- Balto
- The Basketball Diaries
- Batman Forever
- The Big Green
- Clockers
- Closer to Home
- Denise Calls Up
- Die Hard with a Vengeance
- Dr. Jekyll and Ms. Hyde
- Drunks
- Flirt
- Forget Paris
- From the Mixed-Up Files of Mrs. Basil E. Frankweiler
- Hackers
- Headless Body in Topless Bar
- The Indian in the Cupboard
- It Takes Two
- Jeffrey
- Kids
- Kiss of Death
- Little Odessa
- A Little Princess
- Living in Oblivion
- Mighty Aphrodite
- Money Train
- Party Girl
- Rumble in the Bronx
- Sabrina
- Search and Destroy
- Smoke
- Stonewall
- To Wong Foo, Thanks for Everything! Julie Newmar
- The Usual Suspects
- Vampire in Brooklyn

=== 1996 ===
- The Associate
- Basquiat
- Bed of Roses
- Bullet
- City Hall
- Comrades: Almost a Love Story
- A Couch in New York
- Daylight
- The Daytrippers
- Dunston Checks In
- Eddie
- Ed's Next Move
- The Quest
- Eraser
- Everyone Says I Love You
- Extreme Measures
- The First Wives Club
- Flirting with Disaster
- The Funeral
- Girl 6
- Gotti
- Grace of My Heart
- Harriet the Spy
- I Shot Andy Warhol
- I'm Not Rappaport
- If Lucy Fell
- Independence Day
- James and the Giant Peach
- Joe's Apartment
- Killer Condom
- Love Is All There Is
- Maximum Risk
- The Mirror Has Two Faces
- Mistrial
- Mother Night
- Mrs. Winterbourne
- Night Falls on Manhattan
- One Fine Day
- The Phantom
- Ransom
- She's the One
- Sleepers
- Sunset Park
- The Sunshine Boys

=== 1997 ===
- 12 Angry Men
- Addicted to Love
- All Over Me
- As Good as It Gets
- The Beautician and the Beast
- Chasing Amy
- Commandments
- Conspiracy Theory
- Deconstructing Harry
- The Devil's Advocate
- The Devil's Own
- Donnie Brasco
- Fall
- The Fifth Element
- Fools Rush In
- For Richer or Poorer
- Henry Fool
- Highball
- Hoodlum
- Hurricane Streets
- The Ice Storm
- Incognito
- Jungle 2 Jungle
- Kiss Me Guido
- Men in Black
- Mimic
- My Best Friend's Wedding
- One Eight Seven
- One Night Stand
- The Peacemaker
- Picture Perfect
- Private Parts
- The Real Blonde
- Spawn
- Titanic
- Turbo: A Power Rangers Movie
- Turbulence

=== 1998 ===
- 54
- An American Tail: The Treasure of Manhattan Island
- Armageddon
- Belly
- Blind Faith
- Bongwater
- Celebrity
- The City
- Deep Impact
- Earthquake in New York
- Frogs for Snakes
- Gia
- Antz
- Godzilla
- Great Expectations
- Half Baked
- He Got Game
- Illuminata
- Jaded
- Jeans
- Just the Ticket
- Last Days of Disco
- Living Out Loud
- Meet Joe Black
- The Mighty Kong
- The Minion
- Nick Fury: Agent of S.H.I.E.L.D.
- The Object of My Affection
- Operation Delta Force 3: Clear Target
- A Perfect Murder
- Pi
- A Price Above Rubies
- Return to Paradise
- Ride
- Rounders
- The Siege
- Stepmom
- The Substitute 2: School's Out
- The Taking of Pelham One Two Three
- U.S. Marshals
- War Zone
- You've Got Mail

=== 1999 ===
- The 24 Hour Woman
- 200 Cigarettes
- Aa Ab Laut Chalen
- Aftershock: Earthquake in New York
- Analyze This
- Annie
- The Astronaut's Wife
- At First Sight
- Being John Malkovich
- The Best Man
- Big Daddy
- Black and White
- The Bone Collector
- Bringing Out the Dead
- Cradle Will Rock
- Cruel Intentions
- Double Platinum
- End of Days
- Eye of the Beholder
- Eyes Wide Shut
- Flawless
- For Love of the Game
- Ghost Dog: The Way of the Samurai
- Gloria
- The Insider
- Just Looking
- Light It Up
- The Matrix
- Mickey Blue Eyes
- Music of the Heart
- The Ninth Gate
- The Out-of-Towners
- Oxygen
- Payback
- Simply Irresistible
- Stuart Little
- Summer of Sam
- Sweet and Lowdown
- The Thomas Crown Affair
- Urban Menace

== 2000s ==
=== 2000 ===
- The Adventures of Rocky and Bullwinkle
- Agent Red
- American Psycho
- As I Was Moving Ahead Occasionally I Saw Brief Glimpses of Beauty
- Autumn in New York
- Bait
- Bamboozled
- Bless the Child
- Boiler Room
- Bookwars
- Center Stage
- Chinese Coffee
- Coyote Ugly
- Da Hip Hop Witch
- Dark Days
- Digimon: The Movie
- The Art of War
- Dinner Rush
- The Family Man
- Meet The Parents
- Finding Forrester
- Frequency
- Hamlet
- Happy Accidents
- Highlander: Endgame
- The Intern
- It Had to be You
- Keeping the Faith
- Little Nicky
- Loser
- Miss Congeniality
- The Prince of Central Park
- Requiem for a Dream
- Shaft
- Small Time Crooks
- Urbania
- X-Men
- The Yards

=== 2001 ===
- 15 Minutes
- 61*
- A.I.: Artificial Intelligence
- Acts of Worship
- Ali
- The Believer
- The Caveman's Valentine
- Cruel Intentions 2
- The Curse of the Jade Scorpion
- Don't Say a Word
- Double Take
- Downtown 81
- Final Fantasy: The Spirits Within
- Glitter
- Head Over Heels
- Kate & Leopold
- Kissing Jessica Stein
- K-PAX
- The Next Big Thing
- The Royal Tenenbaums
- Serendipity
- Sidewalks of New York
- Someone Like You
- Tart
- Town & Country
- Vanilla Sky
- The Young Girl and the Monsoon
- Zoolander

=== 2002 ===
- 25th Hour
- Ash Wednesday
- Bad Company
- Bomb the System
- Brown Sugar
- Catch Me If You Can
- Changing Lanes
- City by the Sea
- Death to Smoochy
- Deuces Wild
- Divine Secrets of the Ya-Ya Sisterhood
- Empire
- Gangs of New York
- Get A Clue
- The Guru
- Hollywood Ending
- Igby Goes Down
- Life or Something Like It
- Maid in Manhattan
- Manito
- Men in Black II
- Mr. Deeds
- Paid in Full
- Panic Room
- People I Know
- Phone Booth
- Raising Victor Vargas
- Roger Dodger
- Spider-Man
- Stuart Little 2
- Sweet Home Alabama
- Two Weeks Notice
- Unfaithful
- Washington Heights
- WiseGirls
- You Stupid Man

=== 2003 ===
- Anger Management
- Anne B. Real
- Daredevil
- Down with Love
- Duplex
- Elf
- The Fighting Temptations
- Homeless to Harvard: The Liz Murray Story
- Honey
- How to Lose a Guy in 10 Days
- In America
- In the Cut
- Kal Ho Naa Ho
- Kangaroo Jack
- Kill the Poor
- Love the Hard Way
- Marci X
- Nikos the Impaler
- Pieces of April
- Something's Gotta Give
- Uptown Girls
- What a Girl Wants
- X2

=== 2004 ===
- 13 Going on 30
- Alfie
- Along Came Polly
- Anacondas: The Hunt for the Blood Orchid
- Birth
- Confessions of a Teenage Drama Queen
- The Day After Tomorrow
- Devil Man
- Eternal Sunshine of the Spotless Mind
- Fahrenheit 9/11
- FahrenHYPE 9/11
- Flyboys
- The Forgotten
- Godzilla: Final Wars
- Heights
- Hellboy
- Hum Tum
- In Good Company
- Jersey Girl
- Keane
- Lbs.
- Laws of Attraction
- Little Black Book
- The Manchurian Candidate
- Maria Full of Grace
- Melinda and Melinda
- Mysterious Skin
- New York Minute
- P.S.
- Raising Helen
- Rick
- Seed of Chucky
- She Hate Me
- Sky Captain and the World of Tomorrow
- Spider-Man 2
- Take Out
- Taxi
- The Terminal
- White Chicks

=== 2005 ===
- Angel Rodriguez
- Chasing Ghosts
- Cinderella Man
- Dark Water
- Edmond
- Fantastic Four
- Game 6
- Get Rich or Die Tryin'
- Hitch
- The Honeymooners
- In the Mix
- The Interpreter
- Jo Bole So Nihaal
- King Kong
- Little Manhattan
- Lord of War
- Mad Hot Ballroom
- Madagascar
- Mr. & Mrs. Smith
- Mutual Appreciation
- Native New Yorker
- Nicky's Game
- The Perfect Man
- Prime
- The Producers
- Rent
- The Sisters
- Sorry, Haters
- The Squid and the Whale
- Stay
- Syriana
- Two for the Money
- Unleashed
- War of the Worlds

=== 2006 ===
- .45
- 16 Blocks
- The 9/11 Commission Report
- Borat: Cultural Learnings of America for Make Benefit Glorious Nation of Kazakhstan
- Bram Stoker's Dracula's Curse
- A Cantor's Tale
- Click
- The Hoax
- Coffee Date
- Day Night Day Night
- The Devil Wears Prada
- Everyone's Hero
- Disaster Zone: Volcano in New York
- Factory Girl
- Fifty Pills
- A Guide to Recognizing Your Saints
- Half Nelson
- Inside Man
- Lucky Number Slevin
- Jaan-E-Mann
- Just Like the Son
- Just My Luck
- Kabhi Alvida Naa Kehna
- My Super Ex-Girlfriend
- Night at the Museum
- The Night Listener
- The Pink Panther
- Puccini for Beginners
- Shortbus
- Vettaiyaadu Vilaiyaadu
- The Wild
- World Trade Center
- X-Men: The Last Stand

=== 2007 ===
- 1408
- Across the Universe
- American Gangster
- August Rush
- Awake
- Bee Movie
- The Bourne Ultimatum
- Brooklyn Rules
- Enchanted
- Fantastic Four: Rise of the Silver Surfer
- Frownland
- Highlander: The Source
- I Am Legend
- Michael Clayton
- I Now Pronounce You Chuck & Larry
- Khuda Kay Liye
- Live Free or Die Hard
- Music and Lyrics
- The Nanny Diaries
- No Reservations
- P.S. I Love You
- Perfect Stranger
- Purple Violets
- Quiet City
- Reign Over Me
- Resident Evil: Extinction
- Rush Hour 3
- Spider-Man 3
- Suburban Girl
- Ta Ra Rum Pum
- TMNT
- WdeltaZ
- We Own The Night

=== 2008 ===
- 27 Dresses
- The Accidental Husband
- Alone in the Dark II
- American Loser
- Batman: Gotham Knight
- Beautiful Losers
- My Blueberry Nights
- Bolt
- Cloverfield
- The Day The Earth Stood Still
- Deception
- Definitely, Maybe
- Disaster Movie
- Doubt
- Ghost Town
- The Happening
- Hellboy II: The Golden Army
- Hookers in Revolt
- How to Lose Friends & Alienate People
- The Incredible Hulk
- Jumper
- Madagascar: Escape 2 Africa
- Made of Honor
- Man on Wire
- Max Payne
- Meet Dave
- Miracle at St. Anna
- Mirrors
- My Sassy Girl
- Nick & Norah's Infinite Playlist
- Nothing Like the Holidays
- NYC: Tornado Terror
- The Pleasure of Being Robbed
- Pride and Glory
- Prince of Broadway
- Punisher: War Zone
- Righteous Kill
- Iron-Man
- Sex and the City
- Synecdoche New York
- The Visitor
- The Wackness
- What Happens in Vegas
- Yeast
- You Don't Mess with the Zohan

=== 2009 ===
- 2012
- Adam
- Bride Wars
- Brooklyn's Finest
- City Island
- Cloudy with a Chance of Meatballs
- Confessions of a Shopaholic
- Daddy Longlegs
- Dance Flick
- Delhi-6
- Eden of the East: The King of Eden
- The Exploding Girl
- Fighting
- G.I. Joe: The Rise of Cobra
- The Hungry Ghosts
- The International
- Julie & Julia
- Kurbaan
- New York
- New York, I Love You
- Night at the Museum: Battle of the Smithsonian
- Ninja
- Notorious
- The Other Woman
- Precious: Based on the Novel Push by Sapphire
- The Proposal
- State of Play
- The Taking of Pelham 1 2 3
- Transformers: Revenge of the Fallen
- Veronika Decides to Die
- Watchmen
- Whatever Works

== 2010s ==
=== 2010 ===
- All Good Things
- Anjaana Anjaani
- The Back-up Plan
- Badmaash Company
- Black Swan
- Boy Wonder
- Cop Out
- Date Night
- Eat Pray Love
- Fair Game
- Five Minarets in New York
- The Four-Faced Liar
- Get Him to the Greek
- Gulliver's Travels
- happythankyoumoreplease
- Iron Man 2
- It's Kind of a Funny Story
- Just Wright
- Kick-Ass
- Last Kung Fu Monk
- Last Night
- Letters to Juliet
- Morning Glory
- My Name Is Khan
- The Other Guys
- Percy Jackson & the Olympians: The Lightning Thief
- Red
- Remember Me
- Salt
- The Search for Santa Paws
- Sex and the City 2
- The Sorcerer's Apprentice
- Step Up 3D
- The Switch
- Tiny Furniture
- The Town also filmed in Chicago, Illinois, Boston, Massachusetts and Los Angeles, California
- Twelve
- Wall Street: Money Never Sleeps
- When in Rome

=== 2011 ===
- 13
- The Adjustment Bureau
- Arthur
- Beastly
- Born to Be a Star
- Captain America: The First Avenger
- Dream House
- Extremely Loud and Incredibly Close
- Friends with Benefits
- Limitless
- Margaret
- Margin Call
- Meanwhile
- Mr. Popper's Penguins
- New Year's Eve
- Night of the Living Dead: Origins 3D
- Our Idiot Brother
- Pariah
- The Pill
- The Resident
- Shame
- Sharpay's Fabulous Adventure
- Suits
- The Sitter
- The Smurfs
- Something Borrowed
- Tower Heist
- Union Square

=== 2012 ===
- 2 Days in New York
- The Amazing Spider-Man
- Arbitrage
- The Avengers
- Bachelorette
- The Bourne Legacy
- The Dark Knight Rises
- The Dictator
- English Vinglish
- Forgetting the Girl
- Frances Ha
- Freelancers
- Journey 2: The Mysterious Island
- Lola Versus
- London, Paris, New York
- Madagascar 3: Europe's Most Wanted
- Man on a Ledge
- Men in Black 3
- On the Road
- Petunia
- Premium Rush
- Red Hook Summer
- Safe
- The Unspeakable Act
- Wanderlust
- War of the Worlds: Goliath
- What Maisie Knew
- Keep the Lights On

=== 2013 ===
- American Hustle
- Anchorman 2: The Legend Continues
- Assault on Wall Street
- Atlantic Rim
- Begin Again
- Blue Jasmine
- Broken City
- Chinese Puzzle
- Dead Man Down
- Empire State
- Generation Um
- The Great Gatsby
- The Immigrant
- The Inevitable Defeat of Mister and Pete
- Inside Llewyn Davis
- Kick-Ass 2
- Kill Your Darlings
- London, Paris, New York
- The Mortal Instruments: City of Bones
- Now You See Me
- Oblivion
- Percy Jackson: Sea of Monsters
- Pokémon the Movie: Genesect and the Legend Awakened
- Paranoia
- The Secret Life of Walter Mitty
- Side Effects
- The Smurfs 2
- Spiders 3D
- Third Person
- The Wolf of Wall Street
- World War Z

=== 2014 ===
- 5 Flights Up
- 5 to 7
- The Amazing Spider-Man 2
- The Angriest Man in Brooklyn
- Angry Video Game Nerd: The Movie
- Annie
- Before We Go
- Birdman
- The Cobbler
- Da Sweet Blood of Jesus
- Deliver Us From Evil
- The Disappearance of Eleanor Rigby
- The Drop
- Heaven Knows What
- John Wick
- Very Good Girls
- The Last Five Years
- Left behind
- Listen Up Philip
- The Longest Week
- Love Is Strange
- Lucy
- Mania Days
- Match
- A Most Violent Year
- Mr. Peabody & Sherman
- Night at the Museum: Secret of the Tomb
- I Origins
- The Other Woman
- Penguins of Madagascar
- PK
- Predestination
- St. Vincent
- Scumbag Hustler
- The Seven Five
- Sharknado 2: The Second One
- She's Funny That Way
- Teenage Mutant Ninja Turtles
- That Awkward Moment
- Time Out of Mind
- Top Five
- Two Night Stand
- A Walk Among the Tombstones
- Welcome to New York
- While We're Young
- Whiplash
- Winter's Tale

=== 2015 ===
- About Ray
- An Act of War
- Avengers: Age of Ultron
- The Big Short
- Bridge of Spies
- Brooklyn
- Carol
- Fantastic Four
- Focus
- Hello, My Name Is Doris
- In Jackson Heights
- The Intern
- Love Live! The School Idol Movie
- Mistress America
- Minions
- The Night Before
- Pay the Ghost
- Pixels
- Queen of Earth
- Run All Night
- Sleeping with Other People
- Staten Island Summer
- Sunshine Becomes You
- Ted 2
- They Look Like People
- Trainwreck
- A Very Murray Christmas
- The Walk

=== 2016 ===
- Abacus: Small Enough to Jail
- Cafe Society
- Captain America: Civil War
- Carrie Pilby
- Catfight
- Collateral Beauty
- Doctor Strange
- Fantastic Beasts and Where to Find Them
- Ghostbusters
- Hands of Stone
- Havenhurst
- High Strung
- How to Be Single
- Hulk: Where Monsters Dwell
- Hush
- Manhattan Night
- Money Monster
- Nerve
- Nine Lives
- Norm of the North
- Patriots Day
- The Secret Life of Pets
- Sully
- Tallulah
- Teenage Mutant Ninja Turtles: Out of the Shadows
- White Girl

=== 2017 ===
- 9/11
- Beach Rats
- The Boy Downstairs
- Bushwick
- Dean
- Ex Libris: The New York Public Library
- The Fate of the Furious
- Going in Style
- Good Time
- Golden Exits
- Gotti
- The Greatest Showman
- The Incredible Jessica James
- Jerry Before Seinfeld
- John Wick: Chapter 2
- Lady Bird
- Landline
- The Meyerowitz Stories
- The Only Living Boy in New York
- Person to Person
- Resident Evil: Vendetta
- Return to Montauk
- Roxanne Roxanne
- Spider-Man: Homecoming
- Where Is Kyra?
- Wonder Wheel
- Wonderstruck

=== 2018 ===
- After Everything
- Avengers: Infinity War
- Can You Ever Forgive Me?
- The Commuter
- Detective Chinatown 2
- The First Purge
- Green Book
- Crazy Rich Asians
- Greta
- I Feel Pretty
- If Beale Street Could Talk
- Kusama: Infinity
- Madeline's Madeline
- Ocean's 8
- Private Life
- Second Act
- Set It Up
- Spider-Man: Into the Spider-Verse
- Three Identical Strangers
- Welcome to New York

=== 2019 ===
- 21 Bridges
- The Assistant
- Avengers: Endgame
- Bombshell
- The Farewell
- The Goldfinch
- Good Posture
- High Flying Bird
- Hustlers
- The Irishman
- Isn't It Romantic
- John Wick: Chapter 3 – Parabellum
- The Lego Movie 2: The Second Part
- Little Women
- Marriage Story
- A Rainy Day in New York
- The Secret Life of Pets 2
- Someone Great
- Spider-Man: Far From Home
- The Sun Is Also a Star
- Uncut Gems
- The Upside

== 2020s ==
=== 2020 ===
- The Broken Hearts Gallery
- Equal Standard
- The Boys in the Band
- The Forty-Year-Old Version
- The King of Staten Island
- My Salinger Year
- On the Rocks
- Shiva Baby
- Soul
- Vampires vs. the Bronx

=== 2021 ===
- Arlo the Alligator Boy
- Clifford the Big Red Dog
- Coming 2 America
- False Positive
- In the Heights
- New York Ninja
- Nightbooks
- Spider-Man: No Way Home
- Tick, Tick... Boom!
- To All the Boys: Always and Forever
- Tom & Jerry
- The Woman in the Window
- West Side Story

=== 2022 ===
- All the Beauty and the Bloodshed
- Armageddon Time
- Better Nate Than Ever
- Blue's Big City Adventure
- Bros
- Disenchanted
- Doctor Strange in the Multiverse of Madness
- Fantastic Beasts: The Secrets of Dumbledore
- Minions: The Rise of Gru
- The Invitation
- Luckiest Girl Alive
- Lyle, Lyle, Crocodile
- Marry Me
- Moonfall
- Morbius
- Nanny
- The Other Fellow
- Somewhere in Queens
- The Son
- Spoiler Alert
- Tár

=== 2023 ===
- Book Club: The Next Chapter
- Confidential
- John Wick: Chapter 4
- Love Again
- The Marvels
- Migration
- Past Lives
- Problemista
- Robot Dreams
- Scream VI
- She Came To Me
- Shortcomings
- Spider-Man: Across the Spider-Verse
- The Super Mario Bros. Movie
- Teenage Mutant Ninja Turtles: Mutant Mayhem
- Transformers: Rise of the Beasts

=== 2024 ===
- Anora
- Apartment 7A
- The Apprentice
- Babygirl
- Cabrini
- Civil War
- The Exorcism
- First Shift
- Ghostbusters: Frozen Empire
- IF
- Madame Web
- Players
- A Quiet Place: Day One
- Relay
- Smile 2
- Venom: The Last Dance

=== 2025 ===
- Ballerina
- Caught Stealing
- Eleanor the Great
- The Fantastic Four: First Steps
- Highest 2 Lowest
- The Housemaid
- Jurassic World Rebirth
- Karate Kid: Legends
- Marty Supreme
- Materialists
- Our Hero, Balthazar
- The Scout
- Tuner
- Screamboat
- Sneaks
- Thunderbolts*

=== 2026 ===
- The Bride!
- The Devil Wears Prada 2
- The Drama
- Godzilla Minus Zero
- How to Make a Killing
- One Night Only
- The Only Living Pickpocket in New York
- Scary Movie
- The Super Mario Galaxy Movie
- Spider-Man: Brand New Day
- They Will Kill You
