= 14th Venice International Film Festival =

Italian film festival in 1953

- Location: Venice, Italy
- Founded: 1932
- Festival date: 20 August – 4 September 1953
- Website: Website

Venice Film Festival chronology
- 15th 13th

The 14th annual Venice International Film Festival was held from 20 August to 4 September 1953.

The Golden Lion of Saint Mark was not awarded this year. The jury, having examined the films in competition and noting the considerable average high level of the motion pictures presented, found that no work prevailed in terms of absolute value. In accordance with article 20 of the 1953 regulation, the jury requested from the president of the festival the authorization not to award the Grand Prix, which was finally granted. Instead, the jury decided to award the Silver Lion to six films.

== Jury ==
- Eugenio Montale, Italian writer - Jury President
- Gaetano Carancini
- Sandro De Feo
- Nino Ghelli
- Gian Gaspare Napolitano
- Antonio Petrucci
- Luigi Rognoni

== In Competition ==
English title	Original title	Director(s)	Production country
Anatahan	アナタハン	Josef von Sternberg	Japan
The Bad and the Beautiful		Vincente Minnelli	United States
Don't Forget Love	Vergiß die Liebe nicht	Paul Verhoeven	West Germany
Easy Years	Anni facili	Luigi Zampa	Italy
The Four Poster		Irving Reis	United States
Good Lord Without Confession	Le Bon Dieu sans confession	Claude Autant-Lara	France
The Great Temptation	Die große Versuchung	Rolf Hansen	West Germany
I Vitelloni		Federico Fellini	Italy
I Was a Parish Priest	La guerra de Dios	Rafael Gil	Spain
Jhansi Ki Rani	झाँसी की रानी	Sohrab Modi	India
The Landowner's Daughter	Sinhá Moça	Tom Payne, Oswaldo Sampaio	Brazil
Little Fugitive		Ray Ashley, Morris Engel, Ruth Orkin	United States
Moulin Rouge		John Huston	United Kingdom
Naked Passion	La pasión desnuda	Luis César Amadori	Argentina
Neapolitans in Milan	Napoletani a Milano	Eduardo De Filippo	Italy
The Parvenus	Jara gospoda	Bojan Stupica	Yugoslavia
Pickup on South Street		Samuel Fuller	United States
The Proud and the Beautiful	Les Orgueilleux	Yves Allégret	France, Mexico
The Return of Vasili Bortnikov	Возвращение Василия Бортникова	Vsevolod Pudovkin	Soviet Union
Rimsky-Korsakov	Римский-Корсаков	Nikolai Cherkasov, Aleksandr Borisov	Soviet Union
Roman Holiday		William Wyler	United States
Sadko	Садко	Aleksandr Ptushko	Soviet Union
Secrets of Women	Kvinnors väntan	Ingmar Bergman	Sweden
The Sea Has Risen	Föltámadott a tenger	László Ranódy, Mihály Szemes, Kálmán Nádasdy	Hungary
Thérèse Raquin		Marcel Carné	France
The Secret of Blood	Tajemství krve	Martin Frič	Czechoslovakia
Ugetsu	雨月物語	Kenji Mizoguchi	Japan
The Vanquished	I Vinti	Michelangelo Antonioni	Italy
Youth of Chopin	Młodość Chopina	Aleksander Ford	Poland

== Official Awards ==
=== Main Competition ===
- Silver Lion:
  - Thérèse Raquin by Marcel Carné
  - Ugetsu by Kenji Mizoguchi
  - Moulin Rouge by John Huston
  - I Vitelloni by Federico Fellini
  - Sadko by Aleksandr Ptushko
  - Little Fugitive by Ray Ashley, Morris Engel and Ruth Orkin
- Volpi Cup for Best Actor: Henri Vilbert for Good Lord Without Confession
- Volpi Cup for Best Actress: Lilli Palmer for The Fourposter
- Bronze Lion:
  - Pickup on South Street by Samuel Fuller
  - I Was a Parish Priest by Rafael Gil
  - Les Orgueilleux by Yves Allégret
  - The Landowner's Daughter by Tom Payne

== Independent Awards ==
=== OCIC Award ===
- I Was a Parish Priest by Rafael Gil

=== Pasinetti Award ===
- Ugetsu by Kenji Mizoguchi
