= Lovers and Lollipops =

1956 film by Ruth Orkin, Morris Engel

- Opening titles
- Directed by: Morris Engel; Ruth Orkin
- Written by: Morris Engel; Ruth Orkin
- Produced by: Morris Engel; Ruth Orkin
- Starring: Lori March; Gerald S. O'Loughlin; Cathy Dunn; William Ward
- Cinematography: Morris Engel
- Edited by: Ruth Orkin
- Music by: Eddie Manson
- Release date: April 1956
- Running time: 82 minutes
- Country: United States
- Language: English

Lovers and Lollipops is a 1956 film directed and written by Morris Engel and Ruth Orkin. The film was photographed on location in and around New York City, and tells the story of the romance of a widowed fashion model and an engineer, and how their relationship is affected by her daughter.

The film was the second of three feature films directed and written by Engel and Orkin, who were best known for the 1953 film Little Fugitive. Like that film and Weddings and Babies (1960), Lovers and Lollipops was a low-budget film shot in a naturalistic style uncommon during this era.

The film stars Lori March and was the film debut of Gerald S. O'Loughlin. Cathy Dunn, who did not appear in any other movies, played the girl.

Both Little Fugitive and Lovers and Lollipops were influential independent movies in that era, and influenced the French New Wave film movement and John Cassavetes.

== Plot ==
Ann, a widowed model (March), has a date with her old friend Larry (O'Loughlin), who is an engineer just returned from working in South America. Ann has a seven-year-old daughter, Peggy (Dunn), who has mixed feelings about her mother's relationship.

The three visit the Museum of Modern Art and Central Park, and Larry buys Peggy a toy boat to win her friendship, while at the same time wooing her mother. Larry and Ann visit other places in New York with and without Peggy, and it soon becomes apparent that they have fallen in love. Peggy begins to like Larry but grows petulant, and repeatedly tries to disrupt her mother's romance.

Gerald S. O'Loughlin and Cathy Dunn in Lovers and Lollipops

When they all drive to the beach together, Peggy stays with Larry as he parks the car. Peggy then hides from him in the parking lot, which provides some tense moments. Later that day, Ann is upset when Larry asks that they not bring Peggy along when Ann meets his father. Other incidents involving Peggy also begin to alienate Ann from Larry. He continues to try to win over Peggy, bringing her to the toy department of Macy's, where she deliberately dawdles to test Larry's patience.

When they get home, Peggy claims that Larry was impatient, fed her bad food and hit her when she stumbled. Ann cancels her plans to join Larry for an important dinner with his boss that night. He denies that and leaves angrily. Ann and Larry do not talk for a few days, but begin to miss each other. Larry buys a puppy for Peggy, and they reconcile.

== Production notes ==
As with their earlier film, Engel and Orkin shot Lovers and Lollipops using a hand-held 35 mm. camera, with all sound dubbed subsequently.

Despite the success of Little Fugitive, it took two years for Engel and Orkin to raise money for this film.

The character of Peggy was notable for its realism, showing her as bratty and self-centered, in contrast to the idealized portraits of children typical of 1950s films and TV. The film gained authenticity from its use of authentic New York City locations and a realistically meandering plotline, which made the film resemble real life more than polished movie acting.

== See also ==
- List of American films of 1956
