= Silver Lion =

Venice Film Festival award

- Leone d'argento (Italian)
- 2026 recipient: Ilya Khrzhanovsky
- Awarded for: Best Direction
- Location: Venice
- Country: Italy
- Presented by: Venice Film Festival
- First award: 1953
- Currently held by: Ilya Khrzhanovsky for DAU (2026)
- Website: labiennale.org/en/cinema

The Silver Lion (Italian: Leone d'argento, also known as Silver Lion for Best Direction) is an annual award presented for best directing achievements in a feature film in the official competition section of the Venice Film Festival since 1998.

Russian filmmaker Ilya Khrzhanovsky was the most recent winner for DAU (2026), at the 83rd Venice International Film Festival.

== History ==
The prize has been awarded irregularly and has gone through several changes of purpose. Between 1953 and 1994, the award was given infrequently to a number of films as second prize for those nominated for the Golden Lion. At various times, the Silver Lion has also been awarded for debut films, short films, direction, and writing.

Since 1990, the Silver Lion has been presented to the director of a feature film in the official competition; Martin Scorsese was the first official winner of the award for Goodfellas.

Russian filmmaker Andrei Konchalovsky is the only person to receive the award twice, for The Postman's White Nights (2014) and Paradise (2016).

Notable winners include: Emir Kusturica, Lee Chang-dong, Alain Resnais, Brian De Palma, Paul Thomas Anderson, Jacques Audiard, Roy Andersson, and Jane Campion.

== Silver Lion for Best Direction (1990–present) ==
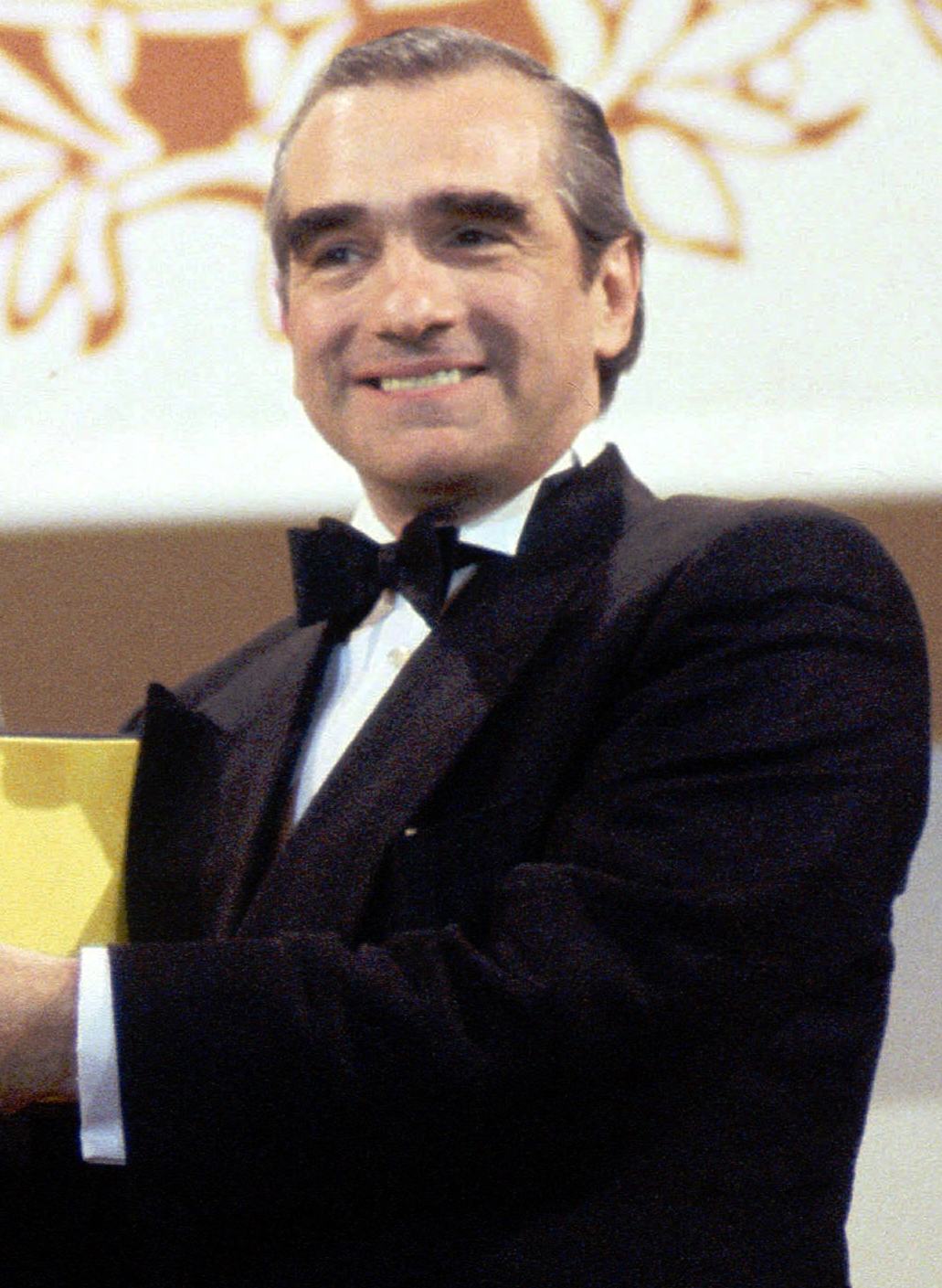
Martin Scorsese won for Goodfellas (1990)

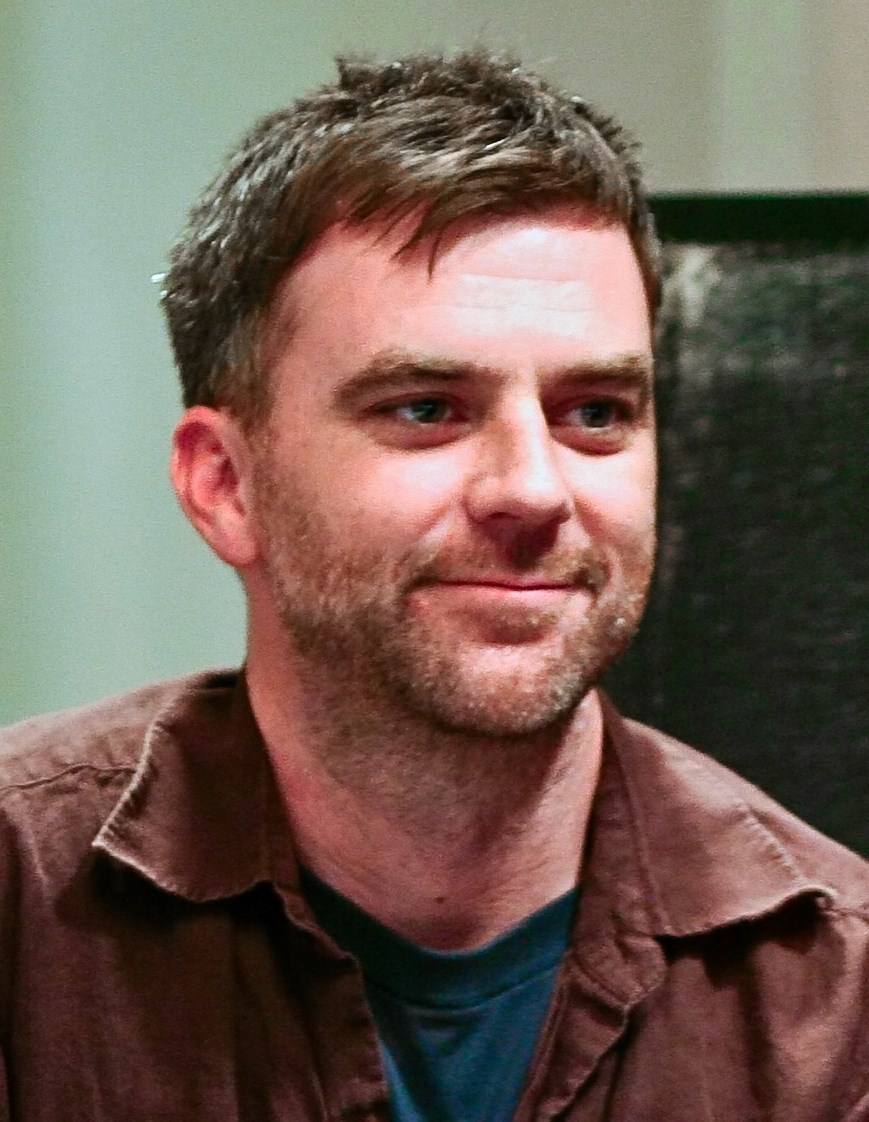
Paul Thomas Anderson won for The Master (2012)

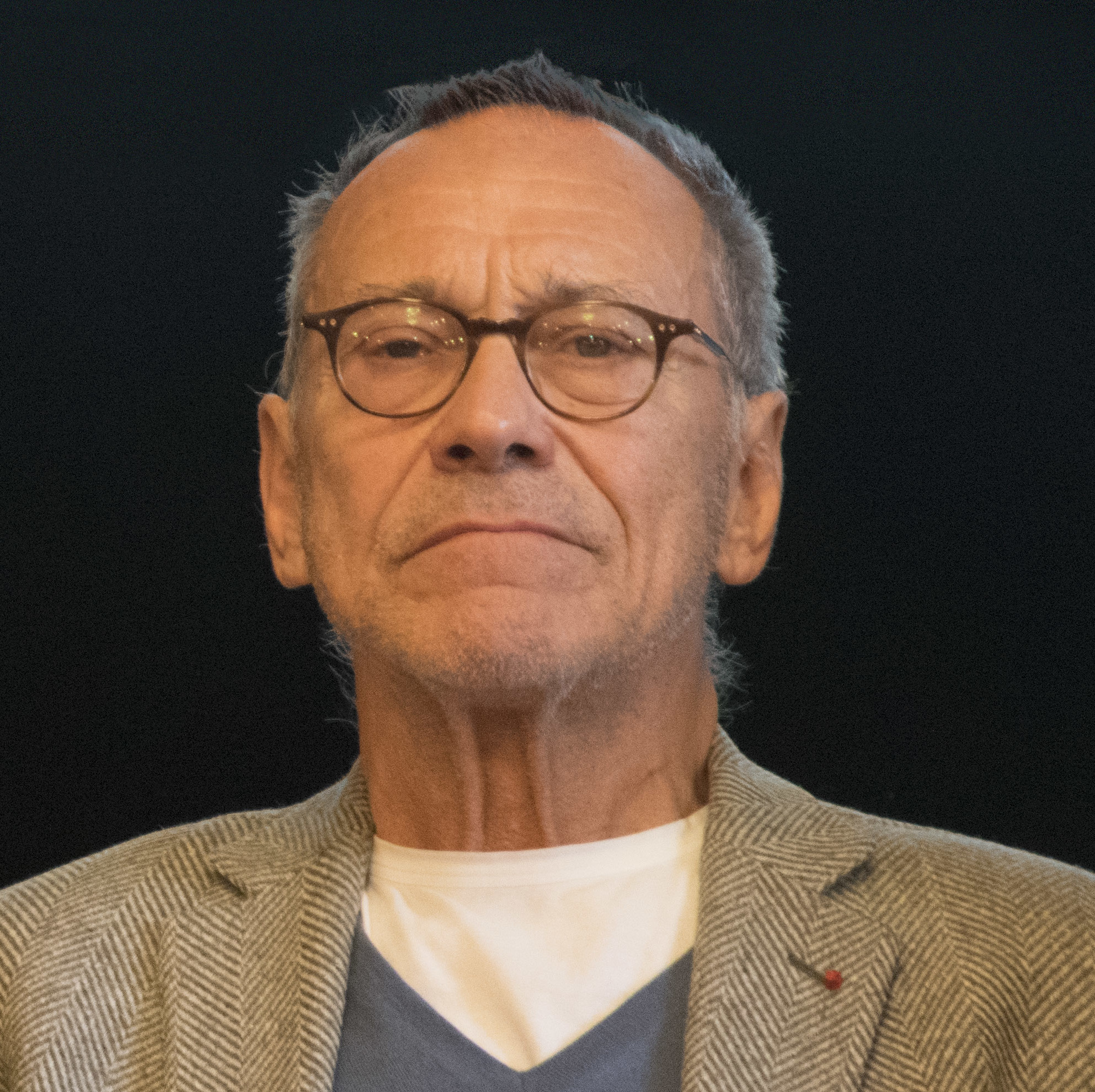
Andrei Konchalovsky won twice for The Postman's White Nights (2014) and Paradise (2016)

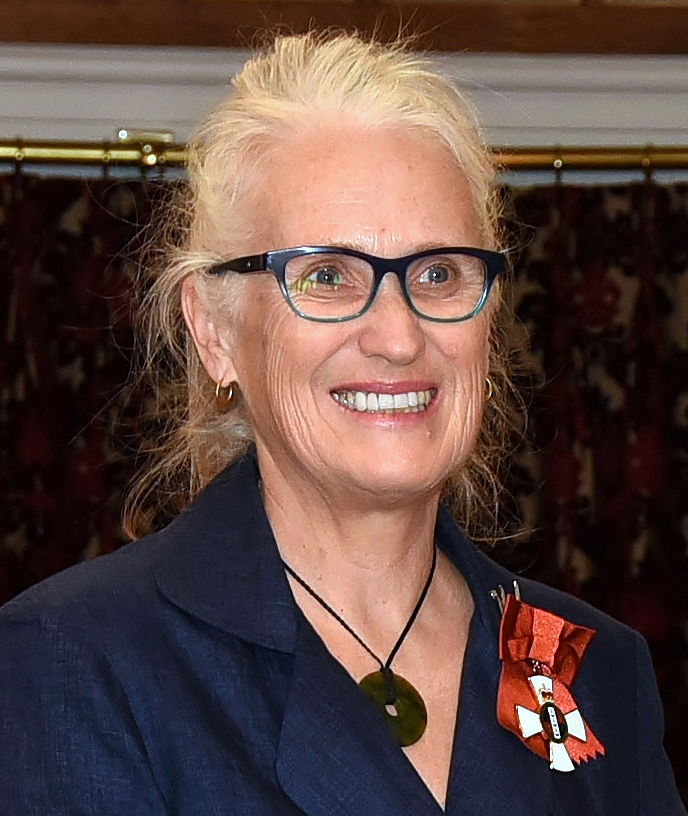
Jane Campion won for The Power of the Dog (2021)

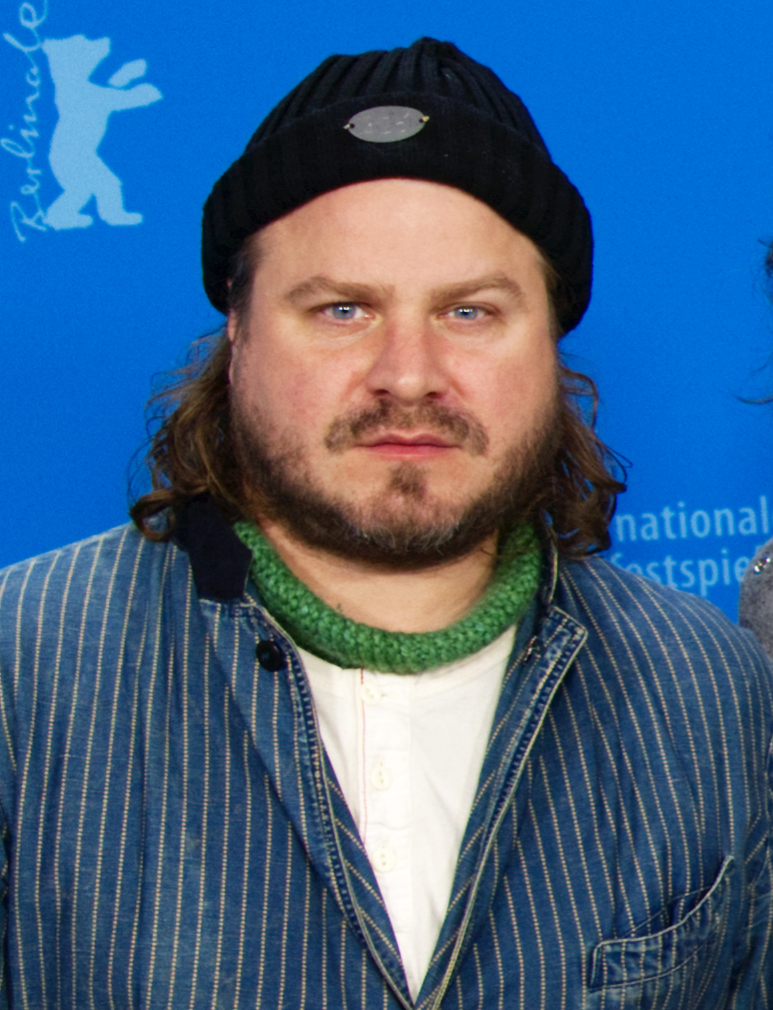
Brady Corbet won for The Brutalist (2024).

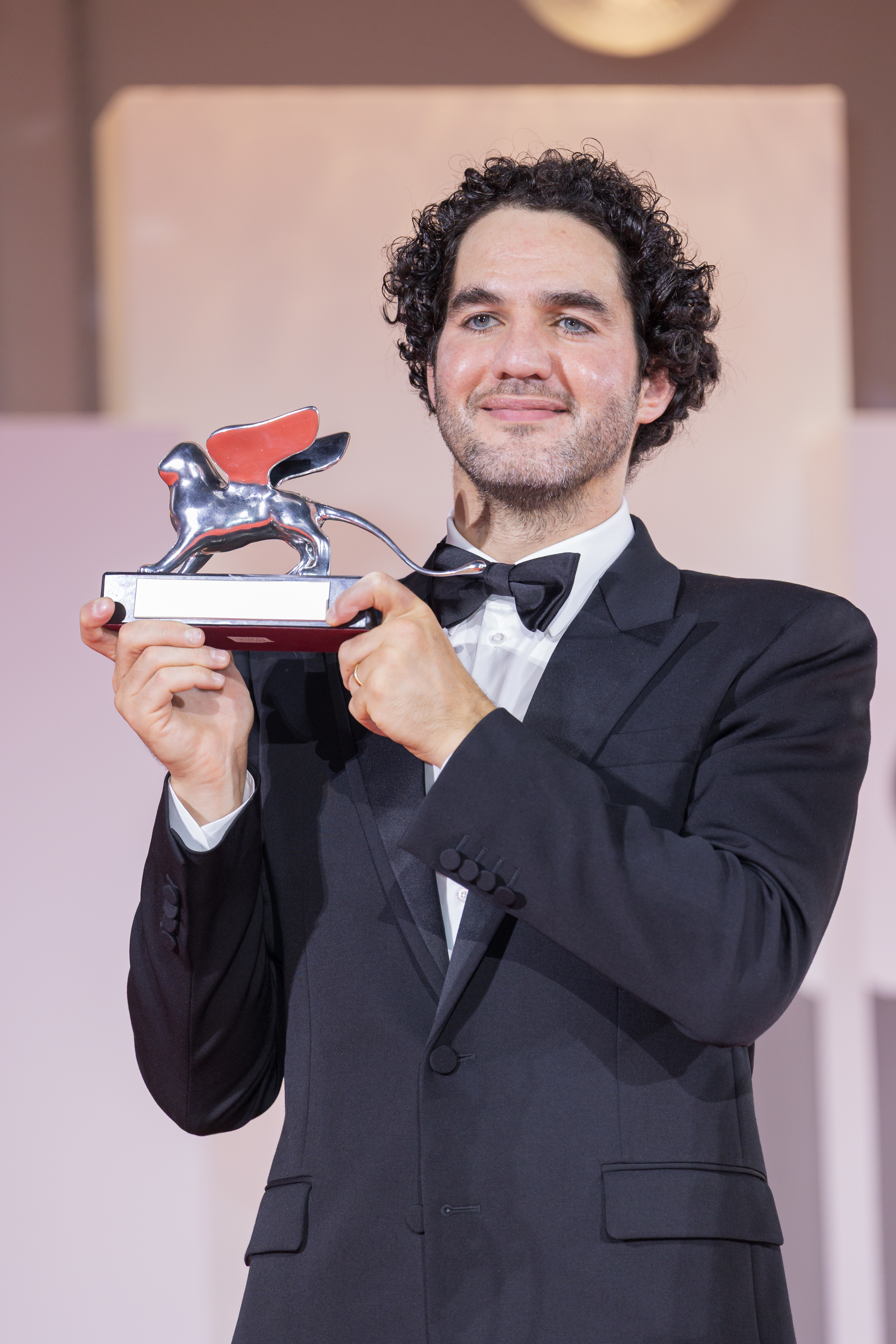
Benny Safdie won for The Smashing Machine (2025)

=== 1990s ===
Year	Director	English Title	Original Title
1990	Martin Scorsese	Goodfellas	
1998	Emir Kusturica	Black Cat, White Cat	Црна мачка, бели мачор
1999	Zhang Yuan	Seventeen Years	過年回家

=== 2000s ===
Year	Director	English Title	Original Title
2000	Buddhadeb Dasgupta	Uttara	উত্তরা
2001	Babak Payami	Secret Ballot	رأی مخفی
2002	Lee Chang-dong	Oasis	오아시스
2003	Takeshi Kitano	Zatōichi	座頭市
2004	Kim Ki-duk	3-Iron	빈집
2005	Philippe Garrel	Regular Lovers	Les Amants réguliers
2006	Alain Resnais	Private Fears in Public Places	Cœurs
2007	Brian De Palma	Redacted	
2008	Aleksei Alekseivich German	Paper Soldier	Бумажный солдат
2009	Shirin Neshat	Women Without Men	زنان بدون مردان

=== 2010s ===
Year	Director	English Title	Original Title
2010	Álex de la Iglesia	The Last Circus	Balada triste de trompeta
2011	Cai Shangjun	People Mountain People Sea	人山人海
2012	Paul Thomas Anderson	The Master	
2013	Alexandros Avranas	Miss Violence	
2014	Andrei Konchalovsky	The Postman's White Nights	Белые ночи почтальона Алексея Тряпицына
2015	Pablo Trapero	The Clan	El Clan
2016	Amat Escalante	The Untamed	La región salvaje
2016	Andrei Konchalovsky	Paradise	Рай
2017	Xavier Legrand	Custody	Jusqu'à la garde
2018	Jacques Audiard	The Sisters Brothers	
2019	Roy Andersson	About Endlessness	Om det oändliga

=== 2020s ===
Year	Director	English Title	Original Title
2020	Kiyoshi Kurosawa	Wife of a Spy	スパイの妻
2021	Jane Campion	The Power of the Dog	
2022	Luca Guadagnino	Bones and All	
2023	Matteo Garrone	Io Capitano	
2024	Brady Corbet	The Brutalist	
2025	Benny Safdie	The Smashing Machine	
2026	Ilya Khrzhanovsky	DAU	

=== Multiple Winners ===
The following individuals received two or more Silver Lion for Best Direction awards:

Number of Wins	Director	Nationality	Films
2	Andrei Konchalovsky	Russia	The Postman's White Nights (2014) and Paradise (2016)

== Defunct Categories ==
=== Silver Lion Prize (1953–1994) ===
From 1953 to 1957, the Silver Lion was awarded to a number of films nominated for the Golden Lion as a second prize. From 1987 to 1994, the Silver Lion was awarded to one or more films nominated for the Golden Lion.

Year	English title	Original title	Director(s)
1953	Little Fugitive		Raymond Abrashkin, Morris Engel, and Ruth Orkin
1953	Moulin Rouge		John Huston
1953	Sadko	Садко	Aleksandr Ptushko
1953	Thérèse Raquin		Marcel Carné
1953	Ugetsu	雨月物語	Kenji Mizoguchi
1953	I Vitelloni		Federico Fellini
1954	On the Waterfront		Elia Kazan
1954	Sansho the Bailiff	山椒大夫	Kenji Mizoguchi
1954	Seven Samurai	七人の侍	Akira Kurosawa
1954	La Strada		Federico Fellini
1955	Le Amiche		Michelangelo Antonioni
1955	The Big Knife		Robert Aldrich
1955	Ciske the Rat	Ciske de Rat	Wolfgang Staudte
1955	The Grasshopper	Попрыгунья	Samson Samsonov
1957	White Nights	Le Notti Bianche	Luchino Visconti
1987	Maurice		James Ivory
1987	Long Live the Lady!	Lunga vita alla signora!	Ermanno Olmi
1988	Landscape in the Mist	Τοπίο στην ομίχλη	Theo Angelopoulos
1989	Death of a Tea Master	千利休 本覺坊遺文	Kei Kumai
1989	Recollections of the Yellow House	Recordações da Casa Amarela	João César Monteiro
1991	The Fisher King		Terry Gilliam
1991	J'entends plus la guitare		Philippe Garrel
1991	Raise the Red Lantern	大紅燈籠高高掛	Zhang Yimou
1992	A Heart in Winter	Un cœur en hiver	Claude Sautet
1992	Jamón jamón		Bigas Luna
1992	Luxury Hotel	Hotel de lux	Dan Pița
1993	Kosh ba kosh	Кош-ба-кош	Bakhtyar Khudojnazarov
1994	Heavenly Creatures		Peter Jackson
1994	Little Odessa		James Gray
1994	The Bull		Carlo Mazzacurati

=== Silver Lion for Best First Work (1981–1982) ===
Year	English title	Original title	Director(s)	Production country
1981	Do You Remember Dolly Bell?	Сјећаш ли се Доли Бел?	Emir Kusturica	Yugoslavia
1982	Sciopèn		Luciano Odorisio	Italy
1982	The Hes Case	De smaak van water	Orlow Seunke	Netherlands

=== Silver Lion for Best First Film (1983–1987) ===
Year	English title	Original title	Director(s)	Production country
1983	Sugar Cane Alley	La Rue Cases-Nègres	Euzhan Palcy	France
1984	Sonatine		Micheline Lanctôt	Canada
1985	Dust		Marion Hänsel	Belgium, France
1986	A King and His Movie	La película del rey	Carlos Sorín	Argentina

=== Silver Lion for Best Screenplay (1990) ===
Year	Screenwriter	English title	Original title	Production country
1990	Helle Ryslinge	Sirup		Denmark

=== Silver Lion for Best Short Film (1996–2007) ===
Year	Original title	Director
1996	O Tamaiti	Sima Urale
1999	Portrait of a Young Man Drowning	Teboho Mahlatsi
2000	A Telephone Call for Genevieve Snow	Peter Long
2001	Freunde	Jan Krüger
2002	Clown	Irina Evteeva
2003	Neft	Murad Ibragimbekov
2004	Signe d'appartenance	Kamel Cherif
2005	Xiaozhan	Chien-ping Lin
2006	Comment on freine dans une descente?	Alix Delaporte
2007	Dog Altogether	Paddy Considine

=== Silver Lion for Revelation (2006) ===
Year	English title	Original title	Director	Production country
2006	Golden Door	Nuovomondo	Emanuele Crialese	Italy

== See also ==
- Academy Award for Best Director
