= Leonard Elliott =

American actor

- Born: November 23, 1905; New York City, U.S.
- Died: December 31, 1989 (aged 84); New York City, U.S.

Leonard Elliott (November 23, 1905 — December 31, 1989) was an American actor and comedian of the stage, television, and film.

== Life and career ==
Born Leonard Elliott Gothelf in New York City, Elliott began his career as a comedienne in nightclubs and in vaudeville in the 1920s. He remained active as a nightclub performer in Manhattan for five decades. He made his Broadway debut as Bomboski in Brad Greene and Fabian Storey's 1938 musical Right This Way with Joe E. Lewis and Joey Ray. He appeared in seven more Broadway production during his career; including Lenore Coffee and William Joyce Cowen's Family Portrait (1939, as Judas; with Judith Anderson); William Shakespeare's As You Like It (1941, as Touchstone); Clay Warnick's Dream With Music (1944, as Sinbad); George Marion, Jr. and Karl Farkas's Marinka (1945, as Francis); Molière's The Would-Be Gentleman (1946, as Covielle; with Bobby Clark); Albert Wineman Barker's Grandma's Diary (1948, as Boris); and Howard Dietz and Arthur Schwartz's The Gay Life (1961-1962, as Franz). He also appeared in light operas and musicals in summer stock.

Elliott was a character actor in several classic Hollywood comedies from 1940 to 1970. He made his film debut as Tilchinski, the orchestra conductor, in the 1940 Yiddish film Overture to Glory. In 1941 he portrayed Henry in the Abbott and Costello musical military comedy Buck Privates. Other Hollywood comedies he appeared in included Bachelor Daddy (1941, as Clark), It Started with Eve (1941, as Reverend Stebbins), and Diary of a Mad Housewife (1970, as M. Henri). He also appeared as Ken in the drama Weddings and Babies which won the Critics Award at the Venice Film Festival in 1958.

Elliott's first appeared on television in 1948 in the title role of Captain Applejack for Kraft Television Theatre. Elliott portrayed Merlin in the 1955 television adaptation of the Rodgers and Hart musical A Connecticut Yankee. He appeared twice on The Billy Rose Show in 1950-1951, and twice on Mister Peepers in 1952. Other television programs he appeared as a guest on included Star Tonight (1955), The Phil Silvers Show (1957), Naked City (1962), ABC Stage 67 (1966), and Coronet Blue (1967).

Elliott died the age of 84 at Saint Vincent's Catholic Medical Centers on New Year's Eve 1989.
