= French New Wave =

Mid-20th century French cinema movement

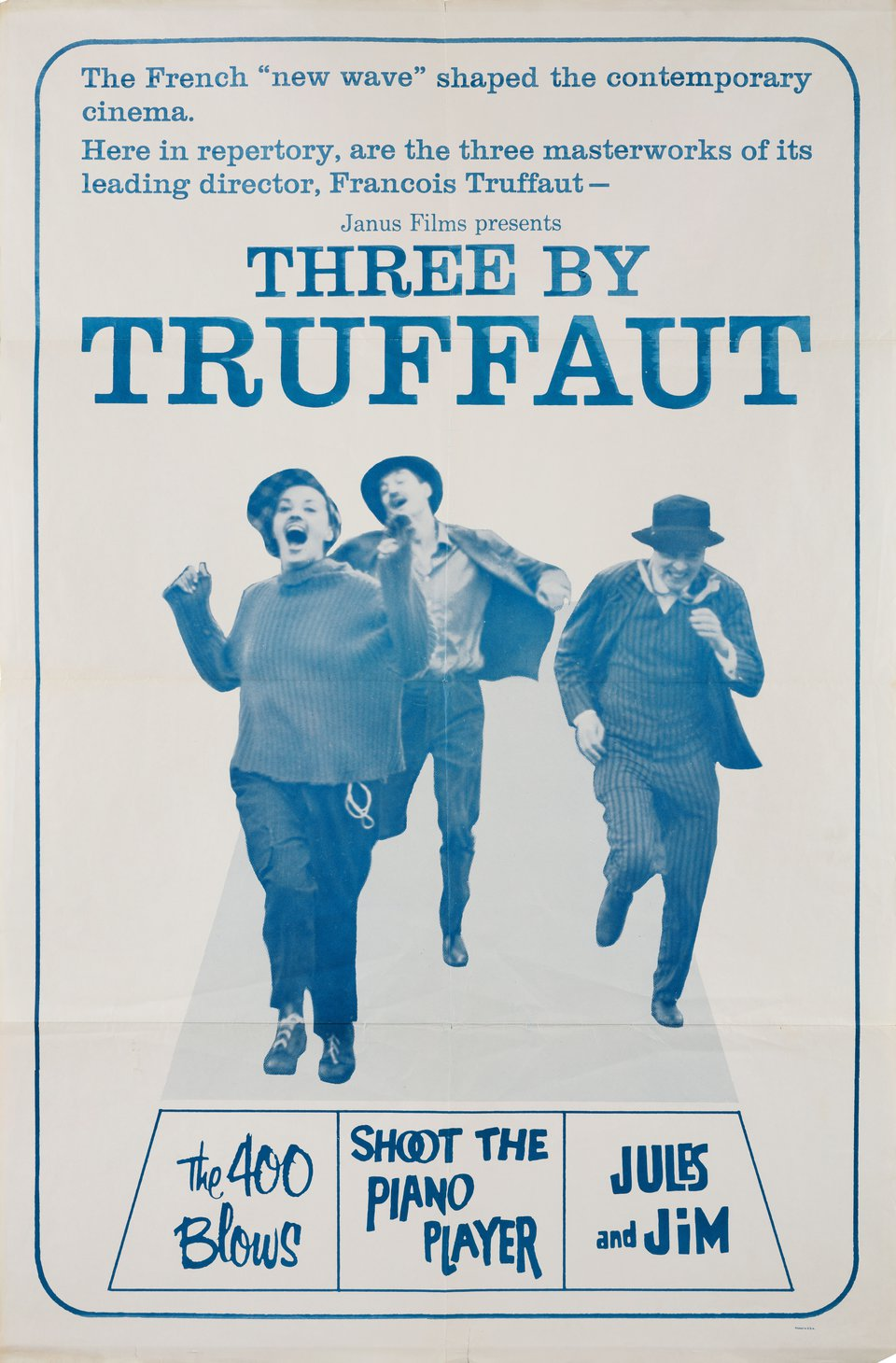
- "Three by Truffaut" poster for the US re-release of French New Wave films The 400 Blows, Shoot the Piano Player and Jules and Jim.
- Years active: 1958 to late 1960s
- Location: France
- Major figures: Jean-Luc Godard, Alain Resnais, Agnès Varda, André Bazin, Jacques Demy, François Truffaut, Éric Rohmer, Claude Chabrol, Jacques Rivette, Chris Marker
- Influences: Italian neorealism, film noir, classical Hollywood cinema, poetic realism, auteur theory, Parisian cinephile culture, existentialism, Alfred Hitchcock, Art film, New Left, Bertolt Brecht
- Influenced: Japanese New Wave, L.A. Rebellion, New Hollywood, New German Cinema, Cinema Novo, Dogme 95, British New Wave, Yugoslav Black Wave, New Sincerity, Mumblecore, New Wave Sci-Fi

The New Wave (French: Nouvelle Vague, French pronunciation: [nuvɛl vaɡ]), also called the French New Wave, is a French art film movement that emerged in the late 1950s. The movement was characterized by its rejection of traditional filmmaking conventions, favoring experimentation and a spirit of iconoclasm. New Wave filmmakers explored new approaches to editing, visual style, and narrative, often engaging with the social and political upheavals of the era through the use of irony or the exploration of existential themes. The New Wave is often considered one of the most influential movements in the history of cinema.

The term was first used by a group of French film critics and cinephiles associated with the magazine Cahiers du cinéma in the late 1950s and 1960s. These critics rejected the Tradition de qualité ("Tradition of Quality") of mainstream French cinema, which emphasized craft over innovation and old works over experimentation. This was apparent in a manifesto-like 1954 essay by François Truffaut, Une certaine tendance du cinéma français, where he denounced the adaptation of safe literary works into unimaginative films. Along with Truffaut, a number of writers for Cahiers du cinéma became leading New Wave filmmakers, including Jean-Luc Godard, Éric Rohmer, Jacques Rivette, and Claude Chabrol. The associated Left Bank film community included directors such as Alain Resnais, Agnès Varda, Jacques Demy and Chris Marker.

Using portable equipment and requiring little or no set up time, the New Wave way of filmmaking often presented a documentary style. The films exhibited direct sounds on film stock that required less light. Filming techniques included fragmented, discontinuous editing, and long takes. The combination of realism, subjectivity, and authorial commentary created a narrative ambiguity in the sense that questions that arise in a film are not answered in the end.

Although naturally associated with Francophone countries, the movement has had a continual influence within various other cinephile cultures over the past several decades. The United Kingdom and the United States, both of them being primarily English-speaking, are of note. "Kitchen sink realism" as an artistic approach intellectually challenging social conventions and traditions in the U.K. is an example, as are some elements of the "new sincerity" subculture within the U.S. that involve deliberately defying certain critical expectations in filmmaking.

== Origins of the movement ==
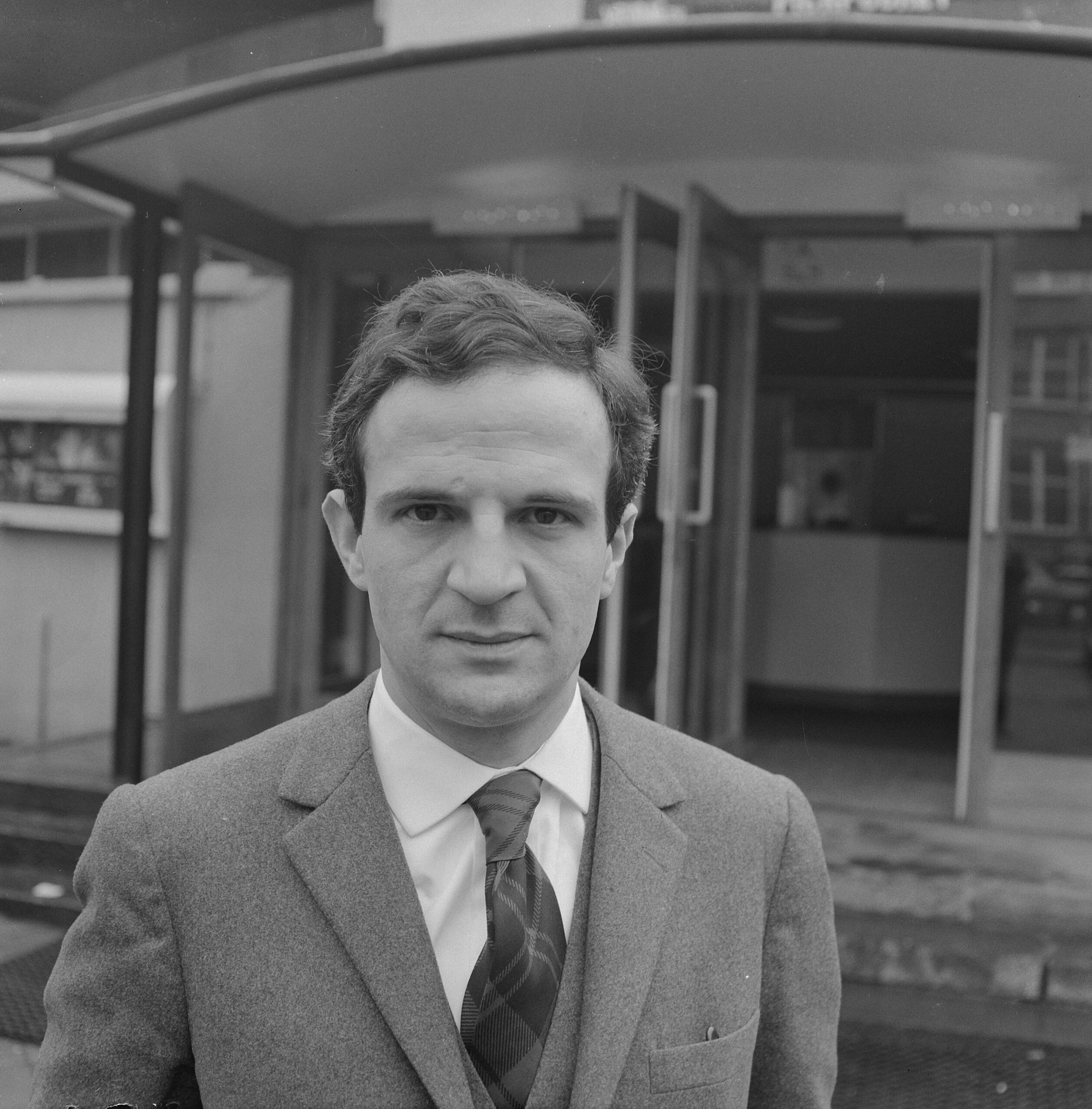
François Truffaut in 1965

Alexandre Astruc's manifesto "The Birth of a New Avant-Garde: The Camera-Stylo", published in L'Écran on 30 March 1948, outlined some of the ideas that were later expanded upon by François Truffaut and the Cahiers du cinéma. It argues that "cinema was in the process of becoming a new means of expression on the same level as painting and the novel ... a form in which and by which an artist can express his thoughts, however abstract they may be, or translate his obsessions exactly as he does in the contemporary essay or novel. This is why I would like to call this new age of cinema the age of the caméra-stylo."

Some of the most prominent pioneers among the group, including François Truffaut, Jean-Luc Godard, Éric Rohmer, Claude Chabrol, and Jacques Rivette, began as critics for the film magazine Cahiers du cinéma. Cahiers co-founder and theorist André Bazin was a prominent source of influence for the movement. By means of criticism and editorialization, they laid the groundwork for a set of concepts, revolutionary at the time, which the American film critic Andrew Sarris called auteur theory. (The original French La politique des auteurs, translated literally as "The policy of authors".) Bazin and Henri Langlois, founder and curator of the Cinémathèque Française, were the dual father figures of the movement. These men of cinema valued the expression of the director's personal vision in both the film's style and script.

Truffaut also credits the American film Little Fugitive (1953) by Ruth Orkin, Ray Ashley and Morris Engel with helping to start the French New Wave, when he said: "Our New Wave would never have come into being, if it hadn't been for the young American Morris Engel who showed us the way to independent production with [this] fine movie."

The auteur theory holds that the director is the "author" of their movies, with a personal signature visible from film to film. They praised movies by Jean Renoir and Jean Vigo, and made then-radical cases for the artistic distinction and greatness of Hollywood studio directors such as Orson Welles, John Ford, Alfred Hitchcock and Nicholas Ray. The beginning of the New Wave was to some extent an exercise by the Cahiers writers in applying this philosophy to the world by directing movies themselves.

Apart from the role that films by Jean Rouch have played in the movement, Chabrol's Le Beau Serge (1958) is traditionally (but debatably) credited as the first New Wave feature. Agnès Varda's La Pointe Courte (1955) was chronologically the first, but did not have a commercial release until 2008. Truffaut, with The 400 Blows (1959), and Godard, with Breathless (1960) had unexpected international successes, both critical and financial, that turned the world's attention to the activities of the New Wave and enabled the movement to flourish. Part of their technique was to portray characters not readily labeled as protagonists in the classic sense of audience identification.

The auteurs of this era owe their popularity to the support they received from their youthful audience. Most of these directors were born in the 1930s and grew up in Paris, relating to how their viewers might be experiencing life. With a high concentration on fashion, urban professional life, and all-night parties, the life of France's youth was exquisitely captured.

The French New Wave was popular roughly between 1958 and 1962. The socio-economic forces at play shortly after World War II strongly influenced the movement. Politically and financially drained, France tended to fall back on the old popular pre-war traditions. One such tradition was straight narrative cinema, specifically classical French film. The movement has its roots in rebellion against the reliance on past forms (often adapted from traditional novelistic structures), criticizing, in particular, the way these forms could force the audience to submit to a dictatorial plot-line. They were especially against the French "cinema of quality", the type of high-minded, literary period films held in esteem at French film festivals, often regarded as "untouchable" by criticism.

New Wave critics and directors studied the work of Western classics and applied new avant-garde stylistic direction. The low-budget approach helped filmmakers get at the essential art form and find what was, to them, a much more comfortable and contemporary form of production. Charlie Chaplin, Alfred Hitchcock, Orson Welles, Howard Hawks, John Ford, Sam Fuller and Don Siegel were held up in admiration. French New Wave is influenced by Italian Neorealism and classical Hollywood cinema.

In a 1961 interview, Truffaut said that "the 'New Wave' is neither a movement, nor a school, nor a group, it's a quality" and in December 1962 published a list of 162 film directors who had made their feature film debut since 1959. Many of these directors, such as Edmond Agabra and Henri Zaphiratos, were not as successful or enduring as the well-known members of the New Wave and today would not be considered part of it. Shortly after Truffaut's published list appeared, Godard publicly declared that the New Wave was more exclusive and included only Truffaut, Chabrol, Rivette, Rohmer, and himself, stating that "Cahiers was the nucleus" of the movement. Godard also acknowledged filmmakers such as Resnais, Astruc, Varda, and Demy as esteemed contemporaries, but said that they represented "their own fund of culture" and were separate from the New Wave.

Many of the directors associated with the New Wave continued to make films into the 21st century.

== Film techniques ==
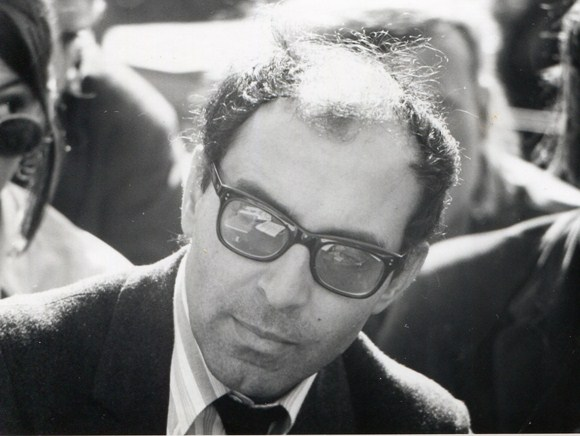
Jean-Luc Godard in 1968

The movies featured unprecedented methods of expression, such as long tracking shots (like the famous traffic jam sequence in Godard's 1967 film Weekend). Also, these movies featured existential themes, often stressing the individual and the acceptance of the absurdity of human existence. Filled with irony and sarcasm, the films also tend to reference other films.

Many of the French New Wave films were produced on tight budgets, often shot in a friend's apartment or yard, using the director's friends as the cast and crew. Directors were also forced to improvise with equipment (for example, using a shopping cart for tracking shots.) The cost of film was also a major concern; thus, efforts to save film turned into stylistic innovations. For example, in Jean-Luc Godard's Breathless (À bout de souffle), after being told the film was too long and he must cut it down to one hour and a half he decided (on the suggestion of Jean-Pierre Melville) to remove several scenes from the feature using jump cuts, as they were filmed in one long take. Parts that did not work were simply cut from the middle of the take, a practical decision, and also a purposeful stylistic one.

The cinematic stylings of the French New Wave brought a fresh look to the cinema with improvised dialogue, rapid changes of scene, and shots that broke the common 180° axis of camera movement. In many films of the French New Wave, the camera was used not to mesmerize the audience with elaborate narrative and illusory images, but rather to play with audience expectations. Godard was arguably the movement's most influential figure; his method of filmmaking, often used to shock and awe audiences out of passivity, was abnormally bold and direct.

Godard's stylistic approach can be seen as a desperate struggle against the mainstream cinema of the time, or a degrading attack on the viewer's supposed naivety. Either way, the challenging awareness represented by this movement remains in cinema today. Effects that now seem either trite or commonplace, such as a character stepping out of their role in order to address the audience directly, were radically innovative at the time.

Classic French cinema adhered to the principles of strong narrative, creating what Godard described as an oppressive and deterministic aesthetic of plot. In contrast, New Wave filmmakers made no attempts to suspend the viewer's disbelief; in fact, they took steps to constantly remind the viewer that a film is just a sequence of moving images, no matter how clever the use of light and shadow. The result is a set of oddly disjointed scenes without an attempt at unity; or an actor whose character changes from one scene to the next; or sets in which onlookers accidentally make their way onto camera along with extras, who in fact were hired to do just the same.

At the heart of New Wave technique is the issue of money and production value. In the context of social and economic troubles of a post-World War II France, filmmakers sought low-budget alternatives to the usual production methods, and were inspired by the generation of Italian Neorealists before them. Half necessity and half vision, New Wave directors used all that they had available to channel their artistic visions directly to the theatre.

Finally, the French New Wave, as the European modern Cinema, is focused on the technique as style itself. A French New Wave film-maker is first of all an author who shows in its film their own eye on the world. On the other hand, the film as the object of knowledge challenges the usual transitivity on which all the other cinema was based, "undoing its cornerstones: space and time continuity, narrative and grammatical logics, the self-evidence of the represented worlds." In this way the film-maker passes "the essay attitude, thinking – in a novelist way – on his own way to do essays."

== Left Bank ==
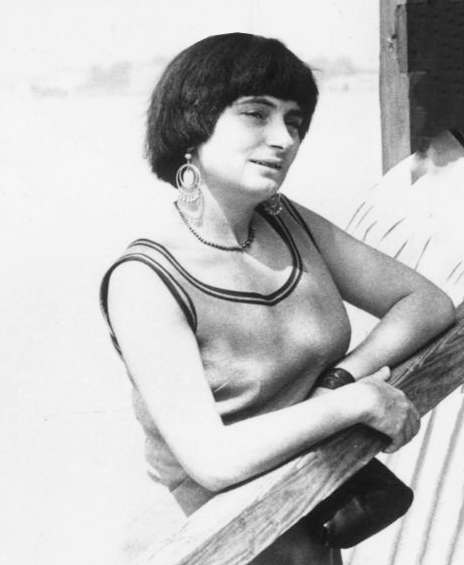
Agnès Varda at the Venice Film Festival, 1962

The corresponding "right bank" group is constituted of the more famous and financially successful New Wave directors associated with Cahiers du cinéma (Claude Chabrol, François Truffaut, and Jean-Luc Godard). Unlike the Cahiers group, Left Bank directors were older and less movie-crazed. They tended to see cinema akin to other arts, such as literature. However, they were similar to the New Wave directors in that they practiced cinematic modernism. Their emergence also came in the 1950s and they also benefited from the youthful audience. The two groups, however, were not in opposition; Cahiers du cinéma advocated for Left Bank cinema.

Left Bank directors include Chris Marker, Alain Resnais, and Agnès Varda. Varda's husband, Jacques Demy, is sometimes grouped with the Left Bank filmmakers. Roud described a distinctive "fondness for a kind of Bohemian life and an impatience with the conformity of the Right Bank, a high degree of involvement in literature and the plastic arts, and a consequent interest in experimental filmmaking", as well as an identification with the political left. The filmmakers tended to collaborate with one another. Jean-Pierre Melville, Alain Robbe-Grillet, and Marguerite Duras are also associated with the group. The nouveau roman movement in literature was also a strong element of the Left Bank style, with authors contributing to many of the films.

Left Bank films include La Pointe Courte, Hiroshima mon amour, La jetée, Last Year at Marienbad, and Trans-Europ-Express.

== Influential names in the New Wave ==
=== Cahiers du cinéma directors ===
- Jean-Luc Godard
- Éric Rohmer
- François Truffaut
- Claude Chabrol
- Jacques Rivette

=== Left Bank directors ===
- Marguerite Duras
- Agnès Varda
- Alain Resnais
- Chris Marker
- Jacques Demy

=== Other directors associated with the movement ===
- Alexandre Astruc
- Michel Cournot
- Jacques Doniol-Valcroze
- Jean Douchet
- Jean Eustache
- Georges Franju
- Philippe Garrel
- Pierre Kast
- William Klein
- Louis Malle
- Jean-Pierre Melville
- Luc Moullet
- Jean-Daniel Pollet
- Alain Robbe-Grillet
- Jean Rouch
- Jacques Rozier
- Barbet Schroeder
- Straub-Huillet
- Roger Vadim

=== Actors and actresses ===
- Anna Karina
- Anne Wiazemsky
- Anouk Aimée
- Brigitte Bardot
- Charles Aznavour
- Emmanuelle Riva
- Jean-Paul Belmondo
- Gerard Blain
- Jean-Claude Brialy
- Françoise Dorléac
- Marie Dubois
- Stéphane Audran
- Jean-Pierre Kalfon
- Bernadette Lafont
- Jean-Pierre Léaud
- Juliet Berto
- Claude Jade
- Jeanne Moreau
- Bulle Ogier
- Maurice Ronet
- Jean Seberg
- Delphine Seyrig
- Jean-Louis Trintignant
- Sami Frey
- Catherine Deneuve
- Jane Birkin
- Marie-France Pisier
- Michel Piccoli

=== Other collaborators ===
- Raoul Coutard – cinematographer
- Willy Kurant - cinematographer
- Henri Decaë – cinematographer
- Georges Delerue – composer
- Paul Gégauff – screenwriter
- Michel Legrand – composer
- Marilù Parolini – photographer, screenwriter
- Suzanne Schiffman – screenwriter

=== Theoretical influences ===
- Alexandre Astruc
- André Bazin
- Robert Bresson
- Henri Langlois
- Roger Leenhardt

=== Theoretical followers ===
- Serge Daney
- Jonathan Rosenbaum
- Andrew Sarris

== See also ==
- Australian New Wave
- British New Wave
- Cinema Novo (Brazilian New Wave)
- Czechoslovak New Wave
- Hong Kong New Wave
- Iranian New Wave (Mowje Now)
- Japanese New Wave (Nūberu bāgu)
- New German Cinema (German New Wave)
- New Hollywood (American New Wave)
- Nuevo Cine Mexicano
- Parallel Cinema (Indian New Wave)
- Novo Cinema (Portuguese New Wave)
- Philippine New Wave (Contemporary Philippine Cinema)
- Romanian New Wave
- Taiwan New Wave
- Yugoslav Black Wave (Jugoslovenski crni talas)
- Arthouse action film
- B movie
- Cinephilia
- Dogme 95
- Experimental film
- Extreme cinema
- Film gris
- Film noir
- Independent film
- Kitchen sink realism
- L.A. Rebellion
- National cinema
- New French Extremity
- No Wave Cinema
- Postmodernist film
- Remodernist Film
- Slow cinema
- Third World Cinema
- Vulgar auteurism
- John Cassavetes – American independent filmmaker in the same vein as the French New Wave
- Pauline Kael – film critic in opposition of the auteur theory popularized by Sarris

== Notes and references ==
=== Works cited ===
- Grant, Barry Keith, ed. (2007). Schirmer Encyclopedia of Film. Detroit: Schirmer Reference. ISBN 978-0-02-865791-2.
