= Little Fugitive (1953 film) =

1953 film by Morris Engel, Raymond Abrashkin

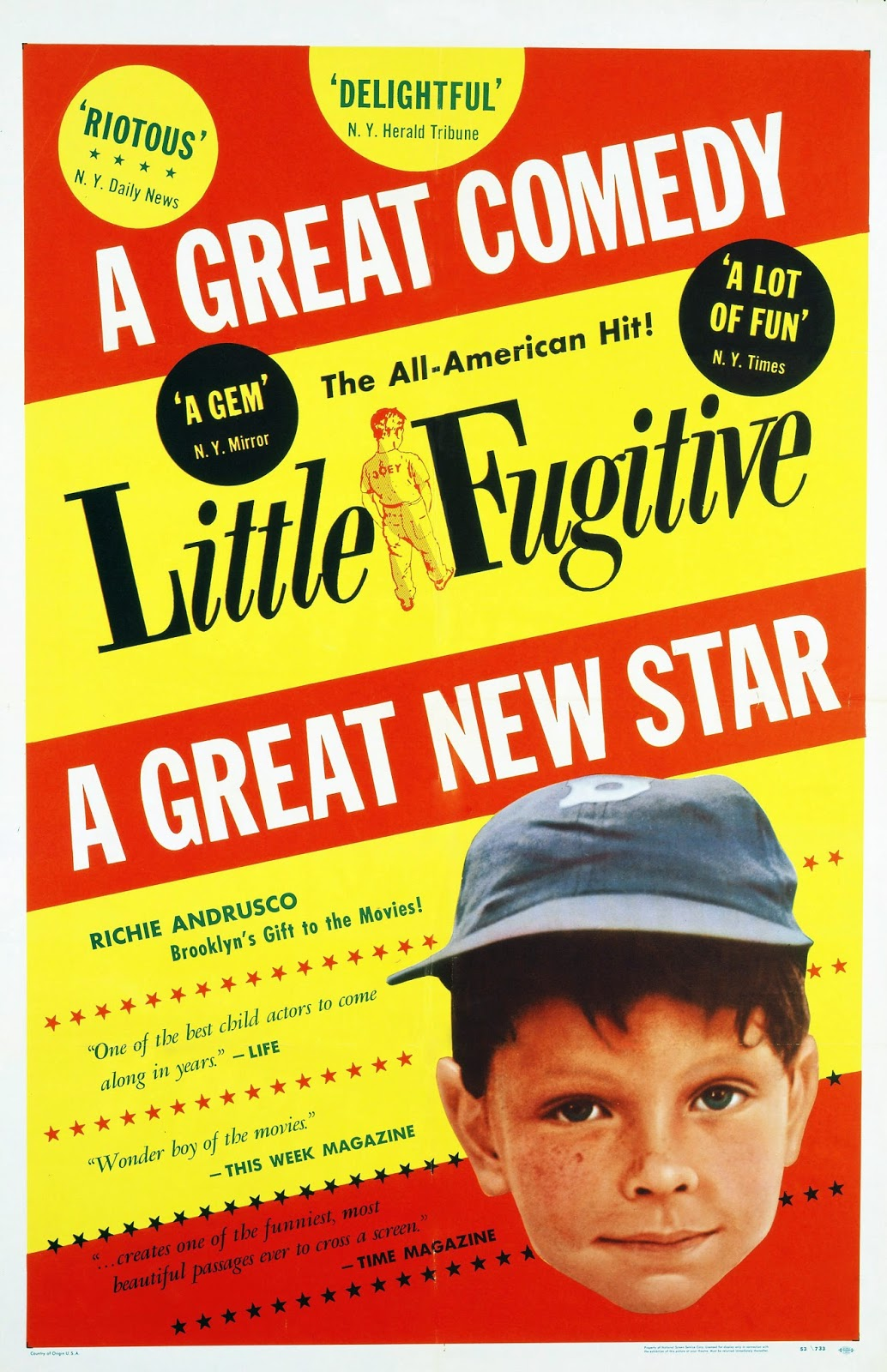
- Theatrical release poster
- Directed by: Ray Ashley; Morris Engel; Ruth Orkin
- Screenplay by: Ray Ashley; Morris Engel; Ruth Orkin
- Produced by: Ray Ashley; Morris Engel
- Starring: Richie Andrusco; Richard Brewster
- Cinematography: Morris Engel
- Edited by: Ruth Orkin; Lester Troob
- Music by: Eddy Manson
- Production company: Little Fugitive Production Company
- Distributed by: Joseph Burstyn Inc.
- Release dates: September 2, 1953 (Venice Film Festival); October 6, 1953 (United States)
- Running time: 80 minutes
- Country: United States
- Language: English
- Budget: $25,000
- Box office: $500,000

Little Fugitive is a 1953 American independent drama film co-written and co-directed by Raymond Abrashkin (credited as Ray Ashley), Morris Engel, and Ruth Orkin, which tells the story of a child alone on Coney Island. It stars Richie Andrusco as the title character, and Richard Brewster as his older brother. The film was screened at 14th Venice International Film Festival, where it was awarded the Silver Lion, and nominated for Best Writing, Motion Picture Story, at the 26th Academy Awards.

An acknowledged influence on the French New Wave, the film is considered by modern-day critics to be a landmark film because of its naturalistic style and groundbreaking use of nonprofessional actors in lead roles. In 1997, it was selected for preservation in the United States National Film Registry by the Library of Congress as being "culturally, historically, or aesthetically significant".

The film is the first and best known of Engel's three feature films. It was followed by Lovers and Lollipops in 1956 and Weddings and Babies, which was filmed in 1957 and released in 1960. All three films were stylistically similar and were filmed with hand-held 35 mm cameras. The cameras used for Little Fugitive and Lovers and Lollipops did not record sound, so the dialogue and sound effects had to be dubbed subsequent to filming, but Weddings and Babies holds the distinction of being the first fictional feature filmed with a portable camera that allowed for synchronized sound.

== Plot ==
Richie Andrusco in Little Fugitive

Seven-year-old Joey Norton lives in an apartment in a lower-middle-class neighborhood of Brooklyn. During the summer, his older brother Lennie has to watch him when their widowed mother is at work, which Lennie resents somewhat. Joey loves horses and likes playing with Lennie and his friends, though they often pick on him.

On Lennie's twelfth birthday, he gets a harmonica and some money to spend at Coney Island, where he is excited to go the next day with his friends Harry and Charlie. When he and Joey get home for lunch, however, they learn their grandmother has fallen ill and their mother is leaving for a day to care for her, which means Lennie will have to postpone his trip to Coney Island so he can stay home and babysit Joey. Frustrated, Lennie finds his friends and tells them the news, and they imagine various outlandish and macabre ways of dispatching Joey before deciding to play a prank.

Harry steals his father's rifle, and Lennie brings Joey to an empty lot to see it. The older boys only pantomime firing, but when it is Joey's turn, Harry puts a bullet in the chamber. Joey closes his eyes when he fires, and Lennie puts ketchup on his shirt and acts as though he has been shot. Charley and Harry tell Joey to run and hide, saying they will give him an hour's head start before notifying the police. Joey takes the six dollars his mother left for Lennie to buy groceries and heads out.

Spooked by police officers in the street, Joey winds up on a train to Coney Island. He goes on rides, has his picture taken, plays carnival games, and buys a lot of food. By the time he happens upon the pony ride, he does not have enough money left to pay for it, leaving him crestfallen.

After making his way down to the crowded beach, Joey sees a boy collecting empty glass bottles. Although he is not sure what the boy is doing, Joey begins to help, and the boy explains that the five-cent deposit for each bottle can be redeemed at a stand under the boardwalk. The boy's older brother does not let the boy share the money from the modest initial haul with Joey, so Joey sets out on his own to earn money for the pony ride. He alternates between collecting bottles and riding ponies until Jay, the nice man who works at the pony ride, asks who is watching Joey, which causes him to get frightened and run away.

Joey wanders aimlessly around Coney Island for the rest of the evening and, after sleeping under the boardwalk, the next morning, as well. He is at the pony ride when Jay arrives for work, and this time Jay is able to get Joey's address under the guise of offering Joey a job. Jay looks up Joey's phone number and lets Lennie know where Joey is, but Joey sees Jay greeting a police officer on the way back from the phone and runs off again.

When Lennie gets to the pony ride and learns Joey is gone, he begins to search for his little brother. At one point, he sees Joey from the parachute ride, only to lose him in the crowd on the beach. Eventually, a rainstorm clears the beach, and Lennie sees the lone figure of Joey collecting bottles.

The brothers head home, arriving minutes before their mother returns. Thinking they have just been sitting inside watching television since she left, she says that, the following weekend, she is going to take them to get some fresh air at Coney Island.

== Cast ==
- Richie Andrusco as Joey Norton
- Richard Brewster as Lennie Norton
- Winifred Cushing as Mother
- Jay Williams as Jay, the Pony Ride Man
- Will Lee as Photographer
- Charlie Moss as Harry
- Prasanna Kumara Dissanayake as Yoshi
- Tommy DeCanio as Charley

=== Cast notes ===
The lead character of Joey was played by Richie Andrusco, a nonprofessional actor who never appeared in another film, and most of the other parts were also portrayed by nonprofessionals. Director/writer/editor Ruth Orkin has a small role as the woman with a baby on the beach. Actor Jay Williams later co-wrote the "Danny Dunn" series of juvenile science fiction novels with director/writer/producer Raymond Abrashkin. The Coney Island photographer was played by Will Lee, who went on to play Mr. Hooper on Sesame Street.

== Production notes ==
The film was filmed on location at Coney Island and in Brooklyn using a unique concealed strap-on camera, which made it possible for Engel to work without a tripod or a large crew and allowed him to have thousands of beach-going New Yorkers as extras without their knowing it. This innovation proved to be "the heart and soul of why Little Fugitive was possible." The camera could be seen as a prototype for the Steadicam and was designed by Engel and his friend the inventor Charlie Woodruff, a fellow World War II combat photographer who Engel called a "mechanical and engineering genius." Over the years, filmmakers such as Stanley Kubrick and Jean-Luc Godard reportedly were eager to borrow this unique camera.

=== Engel's unique camera ===
Engel was an experienced photo-journalist when he was asked in 1939 by his friend Paul Strand to shoot some motion picture film for his film Native Land using the compact 35mm Bell and Howell Eyemo holding 100 foot rolls that could film about one minute of film. But he was disappointed that Strand put this camera designed for hand-holding on a heavy metal baseplate attached to a heavy wooden tripod.

During World War II he was a still photographer but he probably was familiar with a handheld 35 mm battery-operated camera developed during the war for combat photography, the Cunningham Combat Camera. The large square camera was mounted a rifle stock, held tightly to the cameraman's chest by handles mounted on each side, and aimed in the general direction of the action, sighted by a top-mounted viewfinder. With a two hundred foot magazine, it could run for two minutes. The other primary motion picture camera used by the military was the Bell and Howell Eyemo, a spring-run camera held to the eye with a 20-second running time.

After the war, Engel and an engineer he met in the service, Charles Woodruff, reconfigured the Cunningham camera into a much smaller camera for civilian purposes. Engel explained, "Designed for me, it was a compact 35mm, hand held, shoulder cradled, [with] double registration pins and twin lens finder and optical system." It used the Cunningham 35mm 200 foot interchangeable magazines which met the camera at the film gate with the lens, motor, shutter, and viewfinder comprising the camera body. Twin lens geared together enabled the viewfinder lens and the camera to be focused together, as on Engel's preferred still camera, the Rolleiflex. Like the Rolleiflex, the viewfinder was viewed from above. Held against the waist, rather than in front of the face, the camera was both steadier and less conspicuous than the Eyemo. "With a simple shoulder belt support," Engel said, "I was armed with a camera which became the heart of the esthetic and mobile approach to the film the Little Fugitive. This camera was about the same size as the Eyemo, but looked like a giant Ocarina with the camera in the wide part at the top and the smaller curved part below.

Film teacher Joel Schlemowitz says, "The film’s storyline, about a young boy gone on the lam among the boardwalk, beach, and amusements of Coney Island, provided the opportunity to film in situations well matched to this unobtrusive camera's virtues. The Rolleiflex-inspired chest-level configuration also assisted in giving the film its sense of visual rapport with the film's child actor, placing the camera at eye level with the youngster's view of the world."

== Reception ==
=== Critical response ===
The film was greeted by critical acclaim at the time of its initial release. François Truffaut was inspired by its spontaneous production style when making The 400 Blows (1959), and he said years later that "Our New Wave would never have come into being if it hadn't been for the young American Morris Engel, who showed us the way to independent production with [this] fine movie."

Modern critics have also praised the film. Dennis Schwartz called it "A remarkable indy classic, made on a shoestring budget by a group of still photographers. It's an affecting lyrical comedy-drama that fully captures the flavor of urban childhood innocence of the 1950s. [...] The dialogue was sparse, the story was unambitious, the film lacked drama, the children were very ordinary and their problem was only a minor one, nevertheless this beautifully realized film caught the world through the innocent eyes of a curious and scared child and left an impression that was hard to shake. It was uplifting to watch because the effort was so genuine."

When the film was screened in New York after Engel's death in 2005, film critic Joshua Land wrote: "Little Fugitive shines as a beautifully shot document of a bygone Brooklyn—any drama here resides in the grainy black-and-white cinematography, with its careful attention to the changes in light brought on by the inexorably advancing sun [...] Filled with 'Aw, fellas!' period ambience and the mythic imagery of cowboys and horses, comics and baseball, it's a key proto-vérité slice of urban America."

On review aggregator website Rotten Tomatoes the film has an approval rating of 93% based on 45 reviews, with an average score of 8.4/10; the site's "critics consensus" reads: "A simple story well told, The Little Fugitive presents a kid's-eye view of the city that feels refreshingly authentic."

=== Accolades ===
Wins

- Venice Film Festival: Silver Lion (Ray Ashley, Morris Engel, Ruth Orkin)
- Italian National Syndicate of Film Journalists: Silver Ribbon, Best Foreign Film (Ray Ashley, Morris Engel, Ruth Orkin)

Nominations

- Venice Film Festival: Golden Lion (Ray Ashley, Morris Engel, Ruth Orkin)
- Writers Guild of America Awards: Best Written American Drama (Ray Ashley)
- Academy Awards: Best Writing, Motion Picture Story (Ray Ashley, Morris Engel, Ruth Orkin)

Other honors

- added to the National Film Registry in 1997

== Remake ==
Joanna Lipper completed a remake of the film in 2005, which had its world premiere at the 2006 Seattle International Film Festival as part of the New American Cinema Competition.
