= Thérèse Raquin (1953 film) =

1953 film by Marcel Carné

- Directed by: Marcel Carné
- Written by: Marcel Carné; Charles Spaak
- Based on: Thérèse Raquin by Émile Zola
- Produced by: Raymond Hakim; Robert Hakim
- Starring: Simone Signoret; Raf Vallone; Jacques Duby
- Cinematography: Roger Hubert
- Edited by: Marthe Gottie; Suzanne Rondeau; Henri Rust
- Music by: Maurice Thiriet
- Production companies: Paris Film Productions; Lux Film
- Distributed by: Lux Film
- Release date: 6 November 1953
- Running time: 102 minutes
- Countries: France; Italy
- Language: French

Thérèse Raquin (also The Adultress) is a 1953 French-Italian drama film directed by Marcel Carné and starring Simone Signoret, Raf Vallone and Jacques Duby. The story is loosely based on the 1867 novel of the same title by Émile Zola but with the setting updated to 1953. It was shot at the Neuilly Studios in Paris and on location in Lyon. The film's sets were designed by the art director Paul Bertrand. It was screened at the 14th Venice International Film Festival where it won the Silver Lion.

== Plot ==
Thérèse, an orphan, has been brought up by her widowed aunt in a dingy backstreet shop in Lyon and married to her sickly first cousin Camille. Into their stifling existence comes Laurent, a lively Italian truck driver. He is immediately struck by Thérèse, who succumbs to him but will not abandon her husband and aunt. Once aware of the relationship, Camille and his mother plot to get rid of Thérèse.

Their plan is that Camille will take her to Paris and hand her over to another aunt, but Laurent climbs onto the train and, his temper overcoming him, pushes Camille out in the dark at full speed. He then slips out at the next stop and Thérèse maintains to the police that she was asleep in her compartment the whole time. The news of Camille's death gives his mother a stroke that leaves her speechless, cared for by Thérèse who warns Laurent to stay away and not attract police attention.

However there was another man asleep in Thérèse's compartment on the train and, when he sees the newspaper reports, comes down to Lyon and asks for half a million francs to stay silent. Aware that Thérèse and Laurent might kill him rather than pay, he leaves a letter with the maid in his hotel, asking her to post it to the police if he does not return. The pair manage to find 400,000 francs, which he accepts and gives them a signed receipt but, on leaving, he is knocked over by a lorry and dies. The film ends as the maid takes his letter to the post.

== Cast ==
- Simone Signoret as Thérèse Raquin
- Raf Vallone as Laurent LeClaire
- Jacques Duby as Camille Raquin
- Sylvie as Madame Raquin
- Maria Pia Casilio as Georgette, la bonne
- Marcel André as Michaud
- Martial Rèbe as Grivet
- Paul Frankeur as Le contrôleur
- Alain Terrane as Un camionneur
- Bernard Véron as Le postier
- Francette Vernillat as Françoise, la bossue
- Lucien Hubert as Le chef de gare de Dijon
- Madeleine Barbulée as Madame Noblet, une cliente
- Nerio Bernardi as Le médecin
- Roland Lesaffre as Riton, le matelot maître-chanteur
