= Ninalee Craig =

American photographers model (1927–2018)

- Born: Ninalee Allen; November 6, 1927; Indianapolis, Indiana, U.S.
- Died: May 1, 2018 (aged 90); Toronto, Ontario, Canada
- Occupations: Teacher, advertising copywriter
- Known for: Subject of American Girl in Italy (1951)

American Girl in Italy by Ruth Orkin, 1951

Ninalee Craig (née Allen; November 6, 1927, Indianapolis – May 1, 2018, Toronto) was an American woman known for being the subject of a series of photographs by Ruth Orkin, the most notable of which is American Girl in Italy.

== Photographs ==
In 1951, Ninalee Craig, then using the name "Jinx Allen", went on a six-month tour of Europe. While in Florence, Italy, she met photographer Ruth Orkin, and the two became friends. Orkin photographed Craig as she walked around Florence, capturing images of her shopping at markets, flirting in cafés, viewing landmarks, and other travel experiences. The most iconic of the photos is known as American Girl in Italy and shows Craig walking down a street being ogled by a group of men.

Many interpret the photograph as one of harassment and chauvinism. In 2014, Craig said: "At no time was I unhappy or harassed in Europe". "[The photograph is] not a symbol of harassment. It's a symbol of a woman having an absolutely wonderful time!" She has also noted that "Italian men are very appreciative, and it's nice to be appreciated. I wasn't the least bit offended."

== Later life ==
After her trip, Craig returned to New York City and worked as a teacher and an ad writer. She was married to an Italian and lived with him in Milan, but later divorced. After returning to New York, she met a Canadian man, married him, and moved to Toronto. She had a large extended family, including 10 grandchildren and seven great-grandchildren.

== Death ==
Craig died on May 1, 2018, at the age of 90.
