= Morris Engel =

American photographer and filmmaker

- Born: Morris Engel; April 8, 1918; New York City
- Died: March 5, 2005 (aged 86); New York City
- Known for: Filmmaking, Cinematography, Photography
- Notable work: Little Fugitive (1953); Lovers and Lollipops (1956); Weddings and Babies (1958)
- Movement: French New Wave
- Spouse: Ruth Orkin
- Website: Morris Engel Archive

Morris Engel (April 8, 1918 – March 5, 2005) was an American photographer, cinematographer and filmmaker best known for making the first good-quality, internationally recognized American film "independent" of Hollywood studios, Little Fugitive (1953), in collaboration with his wife, photographer Ruth Orkin, and their friend, writer Raymond Abrashkin.

Engel was a pioneer in the use of hand-held cameras that he helped design throughout his features and in using nonprofessional actors in American films, following the example of Italian Neo-realism. His naturalistic films influenced future prominent independent and French New Wave filmmakers.

== Career ==
A lifelong New Yorker, Morris Engel was born in Brooklyn in 1918. After joining the Photo League in 1936, Engel had his first exhibition in 1939, at the New School for Social Research. He worked briefly as a photographer for the Leftist newspaper PM before joining the United States Navy as a combat photographer from 1941 to 1946 in World War II. After the war, he returned to New York where he again was an active Photo League member, teaching workshop classes and serving as co-chair of a project group focusing on postwar labor issues. He was also an active photo-journalist working for Fortune, Collier's and McCalls, among others.

In 1939 he was asked by his friend Paul Strand to shoot some motion picture film for his film Native Land using the compact 35mm Bell and Howell Eyemo holding 100-foot rolls that could film about one minute of film. But he was disappointed that Strand put this camera designed for hand-holding on a heavy metal baseplate attached to a heavy wooden tripod.

During the war he was a still photographer but he probably was familiar with a handheld 35 mm battery-operated camera developed during the war for combat photography, the Cunningham Combat Camera. The large square camera was mounted on a rifle stock, held tightly to the cameraman's chest by handles mounted on each side, and aimed in the general direction of the action, sighted by a top-mounted viewfinder. With a two hundred foot magazine, it could run for two minutes. The other primary motion picture camera used by the military was the Bell and Howell Eyemo, a spring-run camera held to the eye with a 20-second running time.

After the war, Engel and an engineer he met in the service, Charles Woodruff, reconfigured the Cunningham camera into a much smaller camera for civilian purposes. Engel explained, "Designed for me, it was a compact 35mm, hand held, shoulder cradled, [with] double registration pins and twin lens finder and optical system." It used the Cunningham 35mm 200 foot interchangeable magazines which met the camera at the film gate with the lens, motor, shutter, and viewfinder comprising the camera body. Twin lens geared together enabled the viewfinder lens and the camera to be focused together, as on Engel's preferred still camera, the Rolleiflex. Like the Rolleiflex, the viewfinder was viewed from above. Held against the waist, rather than in front of the face, the camera was both steadier and less conspicuous than the Eyemo. "With a simple shoulder belt support," Engel said, "I was armed with a camera which became the heart of the esthetic and mobile approach to the film [the Little Fugitive]. This camera was about the same size as the Eyemo, but looked like a giant Ocarina with the camera in the wide part at the top and the smaller curved part below.

In 1950, Engel tried to sell a March of Time imitation called How America Lives filmed with his new camera to distributors but found no takers.

Richie Andrusco in Little Fugitive

Since he couldn't sell proposed short subjects, he decided to make a feature. In 1953, Engel, along with his girlfriend, fellow photographer Ruth Orkin, and his former colleague at PM, Raymond Abrashkin, made the feature film Little Fugitive for $80,000, shooting the film on location in Coney Island with the hand-held 35 millimeter camera Engel and his friend had designed. This camera was compact and lightweight so it would be unobtrusive shooting in public. As such, it did not allow simultaneous sound recording; the sound was dubbed later. The film, one of the first successful American "independent films", earned them an Academy Award nomination for Best Writing, Motion Picture Story and a Silver Lion at the Venice Film Festival. The film told the story of a seven-year-old boy, played by Richie Andrusco, who runs away from home and spends the day at Coney Island. Andrusco never appeared in another film, and the other performers were mainly nonprofessionals.

A scene from Lovers and Lollipops

Though their first film was a critical success, Engel and Orkin, who had since married, had a hard time finding funding for their next film, Lovers and Lollipops, which was completed in 1956. The film was about a widowed mother dating an old friend, and how her young daughter complicates their budding relationship. Like the first one, Lovers and Lollipops was filmed with a hand-held compact 35 mm camera, with sound dubbed in post-production.

This was followed two years later by the more adult-centered Weddings and Babies, a film about an aspiring photographer than is often seen as autobiographical. This was Engel's first film to have live sound recorded at the time of filming, and is historically the first 35 mm fiction film made with a portable camera equipped for synchronized sound.

In 1961, Engel directed three television commercials, including an award-winning one for Oreo cookies. The other two were for Ivory soap and Fab detergent. A half-hour short film The Dog Lover was made the following year, a comedy about a shop merchant whose life is turned upside down by the stray dog his kid brings home.

He made a fourth feature in 1968 called I Need a Ride to California, which followed a group of young hippies in Greenwich Village. Post-production was shelved until 1972 when it was finally completed, but for unknown reasons it was never released during his lifetime. It finally received its premiere in October 2019 at New York's Museum of Modern Art (MoMA); it was first released on home video in March 2021.

In the 1980s, Engel began taking panoramic photographs on the streets of New York City. Engel and Ruth Orkin remained married until Orkin's death in 1985. In the 1990s, he returned to filmmaking, this time working on video. He completed two feature-length documentaries: A Little Bit Pregnant in 1994 and Camellia in 1998, each revolving around a different child in the Hartman family. First, in A Little Bit Pregnant Engel focused on the 8-year-old Leon's reactions, anxiety and wonderment to the impending birth of his baby sister Camellia. For the second film, two years later Engel returned to the same family, who gave him a year of access to the now 2-year-old daughter Camellia, capturing her daily life and routines, and her relationships with her family and others. Both films were shown in private screenings, but never had a public release due likely to the Hartman family presumably holding the rights.

Engel died of cancer in 2005.

== Legacy ==
Engel and Orkin's work occupy a pivotal position in the independent and art film scene of the 1950s, and was influential on John Cassavetes, Martin Scorsese, Jim Jarmusch, Quentin Tarantino, and François Truffaut, and was frequently cited as an example by the influential film theorist Siegfried Kracauer.

Writing in Cassavetes on Cassavetes, biographer Raymond Carney says that Cassavetes was familiar with the work of the New York-based independent filmmakers who preceded him, and was "particularly fond" of Engel's three films from the 1950s. Carney writes that "Commentators who regard [Cassavetes] as the 'first independent' are only displaying their ignorance of the history of independent American film, which goes back to the early 1950s."

Truffaut was inspired by Little Fugitive's spontaneous production style when he created The 400 Blows (1959), saying long afterwards: "Our New Wave would never have come into being if it hadn't been for the young American Morris Engel, who showed us the way to independent production with [this] fine movie."

== Filmography (complete) ==
- The Farm They Won (1951 short documentary film)
- Little Fugitive (1953 feature film)
- Lovers and Lollipops (1956 feature film)
- Weddings and Babies (1958 feature film)
- One Chase Manhattan Plaza (1961 short documentary film)
- The Dog Lover (1962 short film)
- Little Girls Have Pretty Curls (1962 short documentary film)
- I Need a Ride to California (1968 feature film) (released in 2019)
- Peace Is (1968 short documentary film)
- A Little Bit Pregnant (1994 feature documentary video)
- Camellia (1998 feature documentary video)
- Morris Engel Home Movies (various dates, short documentary) (released in 2021)

== Exhibitions (selection) ==
- November 4, 2011 – March 25, 2012 "The Radical Camera: New York's Photo League, 1936–1951" at The Jewish Museum, New York
- August 20 – August 29, 2005 Morris Engel's Weddings and Babies: Newly Preserved at Museum of Modern Art, New York
