= Weddings and Babies =

1960 film by Morris Engel

- John Myhers with Viveca Lindfors, whose performance was described as the "solid core of the film."
- Directed by: Morris Engel
- Written by: Morris Engel; Blanche Hanalis (story treatment); Mary-Madeleine Lanphier (story treatment); Irving Sunasky (story treatment)
- Produced by: Morris Engel
- Starring: Viveca Lindfors; John Myhers; Chiarina Barile; Leonard Elliott
- Cinematography: Morris Engel
- Edited by: Michael Alexander; Stan Russell
- Music by: Eddie Manson
- Release date: 1958
- Running time: 81 minutes
- Country: United States
- Language: English

Weddings and Babies is a 1958 film directed, produced, and written by independent filmmaker Morris Engel. It stars Viveca Lindfors, John Myhers, Chiarina Barile, and Leonard Elliott.

The last of Engel's feature films, it was shot in 1957 and previewed at the 1958 Venice Film Festival, where it won the Critics Award. Being unable to find a traditional distributor, Engel took the necessary steps to distribute the film himself, including financing it and handling the booking at theaters. It debuted on October 5, 1960.

== Plot ==
The film focuses on the stormy relationship between New York City wedding photographer Al Capetti and his Swedish-born girlfriend and assistant Bea. As the film begins, Bea tells Al how anxious she is to get married and have children of her own.

Al, however, resists getting married until he has substantial savings. He buys a movie camera in order to expand his business, but the camera is damaged accidentally. Meanwhile, Al is under pressure from his elderly mother, who he has just committed to a home for the elderly. At one point, his mother runs away to the cemetery where her husband is buried, as one critic later put it, "to see the grave site that awaits her, one stone among a million in that vast necropolis gazing on the city's distant skyline from the shadow of the BQE."

== Production ==
Weddings and Babies was filmed using a handheld 35 mm motion picture camera, and is considered to be the first fictional movie to be shot with such a camera that also recorded synchronized sound.

According to Time magazine, Engel preferred his actors to improvise and "often throws away his working script". He followed them with the handheld camera to record scenes as they developed, "catching this, missing that, taking his chances and riding his luck." Chiarina Barile, who plays Al's elderly mother, was discovered by Engel while she was sitting on the stoop of a New York City apartment building, and died soon afterwards. She never saw the film.

== Reception ==
A reviewer for Time stated that "as a technical exercise in cinema [Weddings and Babies] is one of the most exciting feature films the U.S. has produced in a decade."

Writing in The New York Times, film critic Bosley Crowther praised the "exquisite and isolatedly eloquent little bits in Mr. Engel's picture." He said of Lindfors' performance that "everything she does—every movement, every gesture, every reaction, every lift and fall of her voice — is so absolutely right and convincing that the style drapes most fitly around her...She is the solid core of this film." However, he also felt the "do-it-as-you-feel-it approach, accounts for more looseness and banality than beauty and eloquence," and that "it fails to develop cohesion and leaves many questions—indeed, the conflict—unclarified." He also criticized the sound quality and said the photographic style provokes "more irritation and bewilderment than surprise."

Crowther said of the film, which turned out to be Engel's last feature: "Perhaps when he gets somebody with real professional skill to write him a script and he learns to hold his camera more firmly, he will give us the great American urban film."

Writing in The Village Voice in 2008, critic J. Hoberman wrote that "Weddings and Babies is "certainly the most extensive portrait of Manhattan's Little Italy before Martin Scorsese's incomparable Mean Streets." He singled out Barile's performance as "incredibly ancient and incomparably dignified."
