= Ruth Orkin =

American photographer and filmmaker (1921–1985)

- Born: September 3, 1921; Boston, Massachusetts, U.S.
- Died: January 16, 1985 (aged 63); New York City, New York, U.S.
- Education: Photojournalism at Los Angeles City College
- Known for: Photography, filmmaking
- Notable work: American Girl in Italy (1951), Little Fugitive (1952), Lovers and Lollipops (1955)
- Spouse: Morris Engel
- Website: orkinphoto.com (Ruth Orkin Photo Archive)

Ruth Orkin (September 3, 1921 – January 16, 1985) was an American photographer, photojournalist, and filmmaker, with ties to New York City and Hollywood. Known for her photograph An American Girl in Italy (1951), she photographed many celebrities and personalities including Lauren Bacall, Doris Day, Ava Gardner, Tennessee Williams, Marlon Brando, and Alfred Hitchcock.

== Early life, education and early career ==
Orkin's An American Girl in Italy

Ruth Orkin was born on September 3, 1921, in Boston, Massachusetts, to Mary Ruby and Samuel Orkin. Ruth grew up in Hollywood, due to her mother's career as a silent film actress. In 1931, she received her first camera, a 39-cent Univex, and soon began experimenting by taking photographs of her friends and teachers at school. At the age of 17, she decided to bike across America, beginning in Los Angeles, and ending in New York City for the 1939 World's Fair. She completed the trip in three weeks' time, taking photographs along the way.

She briefly attended Los Angeles City College for photojournalism in 1940, prior to becoming the first messenger girl at MGM Studios in 1941, citing a desire to become a cinematographer. She left the position after discovering the union's discriminatory practices that did not allow female members. She joined the Women's Auxiliary Army Corps during World War II, in 1941 in an attempt to gain filmmaking skills, as advertisements promoting the group promised. The attempt was not fruitful, however, and she was discharged in 1943 without any filmmaking training.

== Career ==
=== Photography ===
In 1943, Orkin moved to New York City in pursuit of a career as a freelance photojournalist. She began working as a nightclub photographer. She photographed Leonard Bernstein in 1947 for The New York Times. Shortly after, her freelance career grew as she traveled internationally on assignments and contributed photographs to Life, Look, Ladies' Home Journal, and others. Orkin is credited with breaking into a heavily male field.

Orkin's most-celebrated image is An American Girl in Italy (1951). The subject of the later-iconic photograph was 23-year-old Ninalee Craig (known then as Jinx Allen). The photograph was part of a series originally titled "Don't Be Afraid to Travel Alone." The image depicted Craig as a young woman confidently walking past a group of ogling Italian men in Florence. The photo is generally recognized as having been staged. However, in recent articles written about the pair, Craig claims that the image was not staged, and was one of many taken throughout the day, aiming to show the fun of traveling alone.

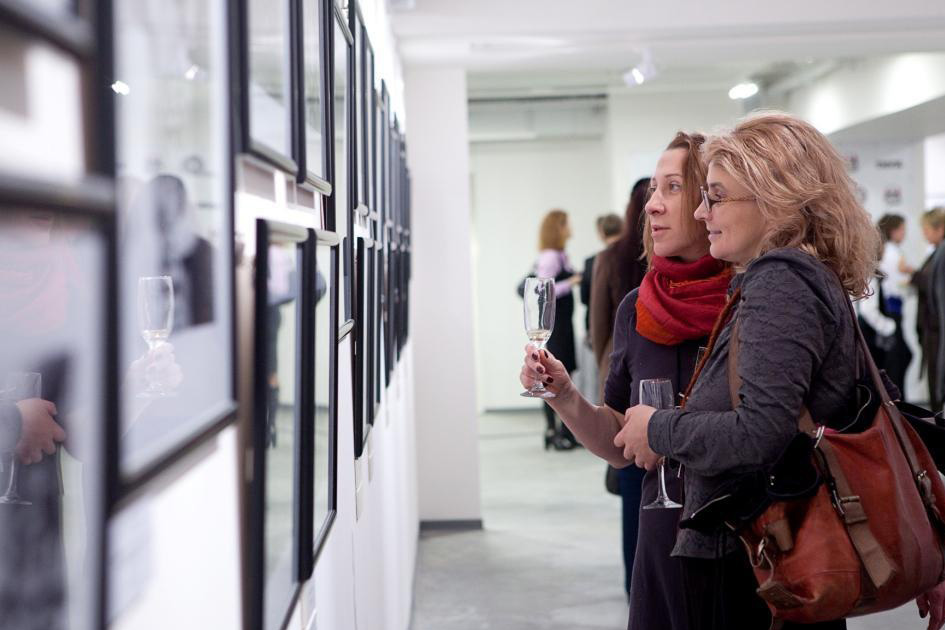
Attendees of a Ruth Orkin Retrospective in 2012

=== Filmmaking ===
In 1952, Orkin married photographer, filmmaker and fellow Photo League member Morris Engel. Orkin and Engel collaborated on two major independent feature films, Little Fugitive (1953) and Lovers and Lollipops (1956).

=== Return to photography ===
After the success of the two films, Orkin returned to photography, taking color shots of Central Park as seen through her apartment window. The resulting photographs were collected in two books, A World Through My Window (1978) and More Pictures from My Window (1983).

=== Teaching ===
Orkin taught photography at the School of Visual Arts in the late 1970s, and at the International Center of Photography in 1980.

=== Awards ===
==== Photography ====
- 3rd-Prize Winner, LIFE Magazine's Young Photographer's Contest, 1951
- One of Top-Ten Women Photographers in the U.S., Professional Photographers of America, 1959
- 1st-Annual Manhattan Cultural Award, Photography, 1980

==== Other ====
- Certificate of Merit, Municipal Art Society of New York, 1984

=== Exhibits ===
- Ruth Orkin: Retrospective. Nikon House, New York City
- Ruth Orkin: Retrospective. Lumiere Brothers Center of Photography, Moscow. January, 2012
- Ruth Orkin + Morris Engel, Fondazione Stelline, Milan, June 26–August 3, 2014
- Retrospective, Fotografiska, New York, 2021
- Ruth Orkin, Museo Civico di Bassano, Bassano del Grappa, Italy. 2022
- Mostra Ruth Orkin, una nuova scoperta. Musei Reali, Turin. March 17 – July 16, 2023
- Ruth Orkin: Women on the Move, National Museum of Women in the Arts, Washington, D.C. December 12, 2025 – March 29, 2026

=== Bibliography, filmography ===
==== Books ====
- The World Through My Window, Harper and Row, 1978 ISBN 9780060132934
- A Photo Journal: Ruth Orkin, The Viking Press, 1981 ISBN 9780670552528
- More Pictures from My Window, Rizzoli, 1983 ISBN 9780847804764

==== Films ====
- Little Fugitive, 1953
  - editor, co-director and co-writer
  - Academy Award nomination, Best Original Screenplay
  - Silver Lion, Venice Film Festival
- Lovers and Lollipops, 1956
  - editor, co-producer, co-director and co-writer
  - The film served as inspiration for Carol (film), according to Director Todd Haynes

== Personal life ==
She and husband, Morris Engel, had two children: Andy and Mary Engel. After a long, private battle with cancer, Orkin died of the disease at her New York City apartment on January 16, 1985.
