= Barnes & Noble Children's & Young Adult Book Awards =

American literary award

- Country: United States
- Presented by: Barnes & Noble
- First award: 2021

The Barnes & Noble Children's & Young Adult Book Awards are a series of annual literary awards presented by Barnes & Noble starting in 2021. There are three categories; Picture Book, Young Reader, and Young Adult. Additionally, an overall winner is chosen from the three category winners.

== Lists ==
Year	Category	Author	Title	Result
2021	Picture Book	Corey R. Tabor	Mel Fell	Category Winner
2021	Picture Book	Tami Charles	All Because You Matter	Finalist
2021	Picture Book	J. Kenji López-Alt; illustrated by Gianna Ruggiero	Every Night Is Pizza Night	Finalist
2021	Picture Book	Stephanie Graegin	Fern and Otto	Finalist
2021	Picture Book	Emily Kilgore; illustrated by Zoe Persico	The Whatifs	Finalist
2021	Picture Book	Cleo Wade; illustrated by Lucie de Moyencourt	What the Road Said	Finalist
2021	Young Readers	B. B. Alston	Amari and the Night Brothers	Overall Winner
2021	Young Readers	Daniel Nayeri	Everything Sad Is Untrue	Finalist
2021	Young Readers	Rebecca Stead	The List of Things That Will Not Change	Finalist
2021	Young Readers	Varian Johnson; illustrated by Shannon Wright	Twins	Finalist
2021	Young Readers	Victoria Jamieson and Omar Mohamed	When Stars Are Scattered	Finalist
2021	Young Readers	Rob Harrell	Wink	Finalist
2021	Young Adult	Angeline Boulley	Firekeeper's Daughter	Category Winner
2021	Young Adult	Christina Hammonds Reed	The Black Kids	Finalist
2021	Young Adult	Aiden Thomas	Cemetery Boys	Finalist
2021	Young Adult	Kacen Callender	Felix Ever After	Finalist
2021	Young Adult	Ibi Zoboi and Yusef Salaam	Punching the Air	Finalist
2021	Young Adult	Chloe Gong	These Violent Delights	Finalist
2022	Picture Book	Christopher Denise	Knight Owl	Overall Winner
2022	Picture Book	Katelyn Aronson, illustrated by Eve Farb	Clovis Keeps His Cool	Finalist
2022	Picture Book	Matthew Forsythe	Mina	Finalist
2022	Picture Book	Naaz Khan, illustrated by Mercè López	Room for Everyone	Finalist
2022	Picture Book	Nilah Magruder	Wutaryoo	Finalist
2022	Picture Book	Fabio Napoleoni	Dragonboy	Finalist
2022	Young Readers	Míriam Bonastre Tur	Hooky	Category Winner
2022	Young Readers	Jake Maia Arlow	Almost Flying	Finalist
2022	Young Readers	Elle McNicoll	A Kind of Spark	Finalist
2022	Young Readers	Alexandria Rogers	The Witch, the Sword, and the Cursed Knights	Finalist
2022	Young Readers	Maleeha Siddiqui	Barakah Beats	Finalist
2022	Young Readers	Jasmine Warga	The Shape of Thunder	Finalist
2022	Young Adult	Xiran Jay Zhao	Iron Widow	Category Winner
2022	Young Adult	Faridah Àbíké-Íyímídé	Ace of Spades	Finalist
2022	Young Adult	Robbie Couch	The Sky Blues	Finalist
2022	Young Adult	Ann Fraistat	What We Harvest	Finalist
2022	Young Adult	Lizz Huerta	The Lost Dreamer	Finalist
2022	Young Adult	Lee Knox Ostertag	The Girl from the Sea	Finalist
2023	Picture Book	Mrs. & Mr. MacLeod	How to Eat a Book	Category Winner
2023	Picture Book	Breanna Carzoo	Lou	Finalist
2023	Picture Book	Mary Lee Donovan, illustrated by Brizida Magro	Let Me Call You Sweetheart	Finalist
2023	Picture Book	Casey Lyall, illustrated by Vera Brosgol	A Spoonful of Frogs	Finalist
2023	Picture Book	Marcelo Verdad	The Worst Teddy Ever	Finalist
2023	Picture Book	Anne Wynter, illustrated by Daniel Miyares	Nell Plants a Tree	Finalist
2023	Young Readers	Beth Lincoln, Claire Powell	The Swifts: A Dictionary of Scoundrels	Overall Winner
2023	Young Readers	Johnnie Christmas	Swim Team	Finalist
2023	Young Readers	Christina Diaz Gonzalez and Gabriela Epstein	Invisible: A Graphic Novel	Finalist
2023	Young Readers	Kiran Millwood Hargrave, illustrated by Tom de Freston	Julia and the Shark	Finalist
2023	Young Readers	Tolá Okogwu	Onyeka and the Academy of the Sun	Finalist
2023	Young Readers	A.F. Steadman	Skandar and the Unicorn Thief	Finalist
2023	Young Adult	Judy I. Lin	Magic Steeped in Poison	Category Winner
2023	Young Adult	Jumata Emill	The Black Queen	Finalist
2023	Young Adult	Jas Hammonds	We Deserve Monuments	Finalist
2023	Young Adult	Zoulfa Katouh	As Long as the Lemon Trees Grow	Finalist
2023	Young Adult	Ryan La Sala	The Honeys	Finalist
2023	Young Adult	M. K. Lobb	Seven Faceless Saints	Finalist
2024	Picture Book	Xin Li	I Lived Inside a Whale	Category Winner
2024	Picture Book	Vashti Harrison	Big	Finalist
2024	Picture Book	Marianna Coppo	The Book That Can Read Your Mind	Finalist
2024	Picture Book	Bess Kalb, illustrated by Erin Kraan	Buffalo Fluffalo	Finalist
2024	Picture Book	Scott Slater, illustrated by Adam Ming	Down the Hole	Finalist
2024	Picture Book	J.P. Takahashi, illustrated by Minako Tomigahara	Tokyo Night Parade	Finalist
2024	Picture Book	Emmy Kastner	While You're Asleep	Finalist
2024	Young Readers	Lisa Yee, illustrated by Dan Santat	The Misfits #1: A Royal Conundrum	Overall Winner
2024	Young Readers	Leah Johnson	Ellie Engle Saves Herself	Finalist
2024	Young Readers	Dave Eggers, Shawn Harris	The Eyes and the Impossible	Finalist
2024	Young Readers	Remy Lai	Ghost Book	Finalist
2024	Young Readers	Pari Thomson	Greenwild: The World Behind the Door	Finalist
2024	Young Readers	Pedro Martín	Mexikid	Finalist
2024	Young Readers	Kiyash Monsef	Once There Was	Finalist
2024	Young Readers	Betty C. Tang	Parachute Kids: A Graphic Novel	Finalist
2024	Young Readers	Matthew Fox	The Sky Over Rebecca	Finalist
2024	Young Adult	Lauren Roberts	Powerless	Category Winner
2024	Young Adult	Pascale Lacelle	Curious Tides	Finalist
2024	Young Adult	Lex Croucher	Gwen & Art Are Not in Love: A Novel	Finalist
2024	Young Adult	Vanessa Le	The Last Bloodcarver	Finalist
2024	Young Adult	Joelle Wellington	Their Vicious Games	Finalist
2024	Young Adult	Kayvion Lewis	Thieves' Gambit	Finalist
2024	Young Adult	Katherine Quinn	To Kill a Shadow	Finalist
2024	Young Adult	Isabel Ibañez	What the River Knows	Finalist
2025	Picture Book	Devin Elle Kurtz	The Bakery Dragon	Overall Winner
2025	Picture Book	Hayley Rocco, illustrated by John Rocco	All the Books	Finalist
2025	Picture Book	Drew Beckmeyer	Stalactite & Stalagmite: A Big Tale from a Little Cave	Finalist
2025	Picture Book	Sarah Kurpiel	A Little Like Magic	Finalist
2025	Picture Book	Alice Pung, illustrated by Sher Rill	Be Careful, Xiao Xin!	Finalist
2025	Picture Book	Marissa Valdez	Hedgehogs Don't Wear Underwear	Finalist
2025	Young Readers	Sangu Mandanna	Vanya and the Wild Hunt	Category Winner
2025	Young Readers	Amy Sparkes	The House at the Edge of Magic	Finalist
2025	Young Readers	H.E. Edgmon	The Flicker	Finalist
2025	Young Readers	Megan E. Freeman	Away	Finalist
2025	Young Readers	Tina Cho, Deb JJ Lee	The Other Side of Tomorrow: A Graphic Novel	Finalist
2025	Young Readers	Mia Araujo	Afia in the Land of Wonders	Finalist
2025	Young Adult	CG Drews	Don’t Let the Forest In	Category Winner
2025	Young Adult	Trang Thanh Tran	They Bloom at Night	Finalist
2025	Young Adult	Gabe Cole Novoa	These Vengeful Gods	Finalist
2025	Young Adult	Laura Steven	Our Infinite Fates	Finalist
2025	Young Adult	Tigest Girma	Immortal Dark	Finalist
2025	Young Adult	Ann Liang	Never Thought I'd End Up Here	Finalist
2026	Picture Book	X. Fang	Broken	Category Winner
2026	Picture Book	Matt Phelan	Bartleby	Finalist
2026	Picture Book	Briony May Smith	Hogbert	Finalist
2026	Picture Book	Gideon Sterer, illustrated by Emily Hughes	If You Make a Call on a Banana Phone	Finalist
2026	Young Readers	Peter Burns	The School for Thieves	Overall WInner
2026	Young Readers	Alan Barillaro	Bunns Rabbit	Finalist
2026	Young Readers	Struan Murray	Dragonborn	Finalist
2026	Young Readers	Chibundu Onuzo	Mayowa and the Sea of Words	Finalist
2026	Young Adult	Jessica Wal	The Secret Astronomers	Category Winner
2026	Young Adult	Shannon J. Spann	A Stage Set for Villains	Finalist
2026	Young Adult	Kiera Azar	Thorn Season	Finalist
2026	Young Adult	Don Martin	Verity Vox and the Curse of Foxfire	Finalist

== See also ==
- Barnes & Noble Book of the Year
- Barnes & Noble Discover Prize
