= Harvey Award for Best Children's or Young Adult Book =

Former American comic book award

- Country: United States
- First award: 2018
- Final award: 2023

The Harvey Award for Best Children's or Young Adult Book was an annual American award for comics and graphic novels geared toward children and young adults. Established in 2018, the award was split into the awards for Best Young Adult Book and Best Children's Book in 2024.

== Recipients ==
Best Child or Young Adult Book nominees, 2018–2023
Year	Title	Author	Publisher	Result	Ref.
2018	The Prince and the Dressmaker	Jen Wang	First Second	Winner	
2018	The Tea Dragon Society	Kay O'Neill	Oni Press	Winner	
2018	Brave	Svetlana Chmakova	JY	Finalist	
2018	Real Friends	Shannon Hale and LeUyeun Pham	First Second	Finalist	
2018	Spinning	Tillie Walden	First Second	Finalist	
2019	Laura Dean Keeps Breaking Up with Me	Mariko Tamaki and Rosemary Valero-O’Connell	First Second	Winner	
2019	Hey Kiddo	Jarrett J. Krosoczka	Scholastic Graphix	Finalist	
2019	Mr. Wolf's Class #2: Mystery Club	Aron Nels Steinke	Scholastic Graphix	Finalist	
2019	New Kid	Jerry Craft	HarperCollins Children’s Books	Finalist	
2019	On a Sunbeam	Tillie Walden	First Second	Finalist	
2020	Superman Smashes the Klan	Gene Luen Yang and Gurihiru	DC Comics	Winner	
2020	Almost American Girl: An Illustrated Memoir	Robin Ha	HarperCollins / Balzer + Bray	Finalist	
2020	Dragon Hoops	Gene Luen Yang	First Second	Finalist	
2020	Guts	Raina Telgemeier	Scholastic Graphix	Finalist	
2020	Stargazing	Jen Wang	First Second	Finalist	
2021	The Magic Fish	Trung Le Nguyen	Random House	Winner	
2021	Allergic	Megan Wagner Lloyd and Michelle Mee Nutter	Scholastic Graphix	Finalist	
2021	Class Act	Jerry Craft	Quill Tree Books	Finalist	
2021	Nubia: Real One	L.L. McKinney and Robyn Smith	DC Comics	Finalist	
2021	Twins	Varian Johnson and Shannon Wright	Scholastic Graphix	Finalist	
2022	Squire	Nadia Shammas and Sara Alfageeh	HarperAlley	Winner	
2022	The Aquanaut	Dan Santat	Scholastic Graphix	Finalist	
2022	Lightfall Book 2: Shadow of the Bird	Tim Probert	HarperAlley	Finalist	
2022	Messy Roots: A Graphic Memoir of a Wuhanese-American	Laura Gao	HarperAlley	Finalist	
2022	Swim Team	Johnnie Christmas	HarperAlley	Finalist	
2023	Hungry Ghost	Victoria Ying	First Second Books	Winner	
2023	Clementine Fox and the Great Island Adventure	Leigh Luna	Graphix/Scholastic	Finalist	
2023	Dungeons & Dragons: Dungeon Club: Roll Call	Lee Knox Ostertag and Xanthe Bouma	HarperAlley	Finalist	
2023	Frizzy	Claribel A. Ortega and Rose Bousamra	First Second	Finalist	
2023	In Limbo: A Graphic Memoir	Deb JJ Lee	First Second	Finalist	
2023	Northranger	Rey Terciero and Bre Indigo	HarperAlley	Finalist	
