= Big Idea =

Big Idea may refer to:

- Big Idea (marketing), a term in marketing and advertising for the guideline behind a brand's marketing campaign
- Big Idea (summer camp), an international Jewish summer camp in Israel
- Big Idea Entertainment, an American Christian computer animation production company best known for their CGI animated series VeggieTales
- "Big Idea", a song by AJR from their album Living Room
- The Big Idea (1917 film), a 1917 short comedy film starring Snub Pollard
- The Big Idea (1934 film), a 1934 short comedy film starring Ted Healy and His Three Stooges
- The Big Idea (American TV series), a 1953–54 TV show on science that aired on the DuMont network
- The Big Idea, a 2006 British reality television series that aired on Sky One featuring Ruth Badger
- The Big Idea with Donny Deutsch, an American talk show
- The Big Idea (book), a 2001 business book by Steven D. Strauss
- The Big Idea (game), a marketing game produced by Cheapass Games
- The Big Idea (museum) (2000–2003), a Scottish museum celebrating invention in Irvine, North Ayrshire

== See also ==
- Big Ideas (disambiguation)
