= Frank Sargeant =

Frank Sargeant may refer to:

- Frank Sargeant (author)
- Frank Sargeant (bishop)

== See also ==
- Frank Sargent (disambiguation)
