= Big Ideas =

Big Ideas may refer to:

- Big Ideas (Australia), a radio program
- Big Ideas (film), a 1993 TV movie
- Big Ideas (Pub Philosophy), events series in London
- Big Ideas (album), a 2024 album by Remi Wolf
- "Big Ideas", song from 2022 album The Car by Arctic Monkeys
- "Big Ideas" (song), a 2008 song by LCD Soundsystem
- Big Ideas (TV series), a Canadian television series
- Big Ideas Learning, an educational publisher
- James May's Big Ideas, a television miniseries

== See also ==
- Big Idea (disambiguation)
