= Tim Cortinovis =

German book author, author, keynote speaker, and consultant (born 1972)

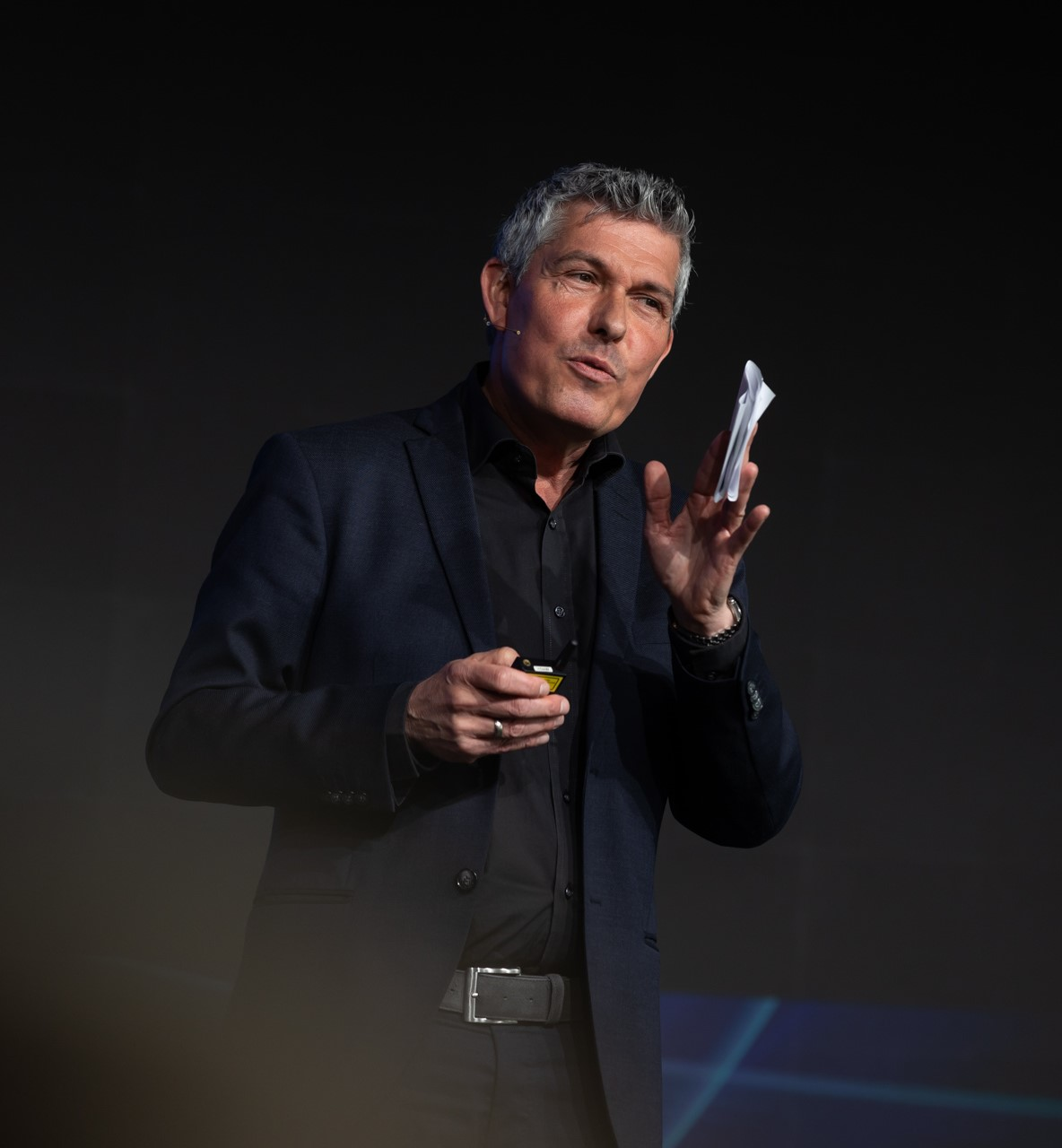
- Born: June 7, 1972 (age 54); Buchholz in der Nordheide, Germany
- Education: Master of Arts in Spanish and German Linguistics, University of Hamburg
- Occupations: Author, speaker, entrepreneur
- Years active: 1997–present
- Notable work: The Single-Handed Unicorn, Selling Smarter, Not Harder
- Website: Official Site

Tim Cortinovis (born June 7, 1972, Buchholz-in-der-Nordheide, Germany) is a German author, keynote speaker, and consultant specializing in AI, sales, and digital transformation. He is best known for developing the concept of ''single-handed unicorns''—billion-dollar companies founded and scaled by solo entrepreneurs using AI, freelancers, and automation.

== Early life and education ==
Cortinovis grew up in a family that owned a bookstore. He studied linguistics and audiovisual communication in Hamburg, Germany, and Málaga, Spain. In 2001 he completed his Master of Arts in Spanish and German linguistics with a thesis titled "Construction of Meaning in Hypertexts."

== Career ==
In 1997 he published his first German novel, "Herzfassen," as a podcast. Then, he worked for a year as a television news presenter in Torre del Mar, Spain. For the following 15 years, he held international sales and marketing positions for tech, advertising, finance, and IT companies.

Since 2020s Cortinovis focuses on writing and public speaking. He has a YouTube channel, Tomorrow Minds, dedicated to exploring innovation through generative AI. Since 2011, he has delivered talks on AI, innovation, and exponential technologies in sales and marketing across the globe, including Australia, the US, and several European and Asian countries.

Cortinovis is a member of the Global Speakers Federation (GSF) and the German Speakers Association (GSA). Cortinovis has appeared as a speaker at the Rise of AI Conference 2025 in Berlin, Insight Jam Q2 2025 (virtual) delivering a keynote titled The Future is Solo: AI is Creating One-Person Billion-Dollar Companies, and the #nxtKNOWLEDGE Forum 2025 in Böblingen. He was recognised as a Thought Leader in AI by Thinkers360 and The Keenfolks.

== Publications ==
- ''The Single-Handed Unicorn: How to Solo Build a Billion-Dollar Company'' (2025)
- ''Selling Smarter, Not Harder: How Sales Leaders Use Generative AI For Sales Excellence'' (2024)
- ''Homo Automaticus: Embracing Our AI-Driven Evolution'' (2024)
- ''So geht Vertrieb in Zukunft. Wie KI und Robotics den Vertrieb im Mittelstand verändern'' (2nd ed., 2024)
- ''Das ist Marketing Automation! Das ist Sales Automation! Vertriebsautomatisierung für KMU und Start-ups'' (2021)
- ''Warm werden mit der Kaltakquise: mehr Kunden – mehr Spaß'' (2012)
- The Single-Handed Unicorn: How to Solo Build a Billion-Dollar Company (2025) ISBN 9798307651278
- The Single-Handed Unicorn Toolset: The Billion-Dollar Solopreneur (2025) ISBN 9798283225838
- The Single-Handed Unicorn Mindset: The Billion-Dollar Solopreneur (2025) ISBN 9798319394125
- Agentic Sales. AI And The Future of Sales. (2025) ISBN 9798296818140

=== Translations ===
- Bán hàng thông minh trong thời đại AI (ISBN 978-604-619-151-8) – Vietnamese edition of Selling Smarter, Not Harder, published by Alpha Books.
