= Howard Cannon (author) =

American author, motivational speaker

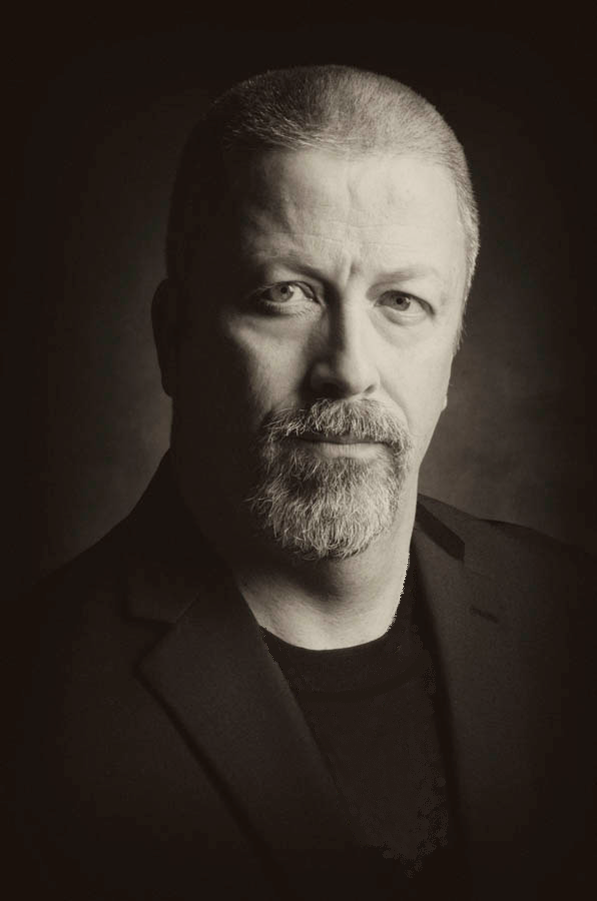
- Born: July 29, 1964 (age 62); Rockford, Illinois
- Occupations: Expert witness, author, public speaker, restaurant consultant
- Writing career
- Subject: Restaurant industry
- Website: restaurantexpertwitness.com violentdining.com

Howard Cannon (born July 29, 1964) is an American author, consultant, motivational speaker, and court-testifying expert witness in restaurant and bar matters nationwide. Cannon is the author of Restaurant Ridiculous: Dram Shop & Alcohol Liability Personal Injury Lawsuits (2025), Restaurant Ridiculous: Slip and Fall Personal Injury Lawsuits (2025), Restaurant OSHA Safety and Security: The Book of Restaurant Industry Standards and Best Practices (2016) and The Complete Idiot's Guide to Starting Your Own Restaurant (2011), among others. Cannon writes and speaks about restaurant safety, as well as the management and starting of restaurants and bars.

In 2026, Cannon launched Violent Dining, a multi-media platform that combines Cannon's experience as a restauranter, expert witness, public speaker and author to continue his work in promoting safety in the restaurant industry.

== Career ==
Cannon's restaurant career began with a dishwashing position as a teenager from which he worked his way up through various jobs in the restaurant industry until he started his own business.

In 1987, Cannon opened Restaurant Consultants of America, a private consulting firm and expert witness practice. He has spoken at restaurant industry events, culinary institutes, corporate events, universities, and high schools as an expert on the restaurant industry.

Cannon authored The Complete Idiot's Guide to Starting Your Own Restaurant, which was published by Alpha Books in 2001. That year he founded the Restaurant Operations Institute, a company that provides advice and services to independent restaurants.

Stretch Yourself – Getting Promoted was authored by Cannon and published in 2003 by Pearson Books. A second edition of his guidebook, The Complete Idiot's Guide to Starting a Restaurant, was published by Alpha Books in 2005.

Cannon is CEO of the firm Restaurant Expert Witness in Alabama, whose members testify and provide reports about food-related legal matters. In 2014, Cannon was called to testify in a court case as an expert on state restaurant law.

Cannon wrote the book of OSHA standards in the Restaurant industry with his book Restaurant OSHA Safety and Security: The Book of Restaurant Industry Standards & Best Practices which was published in 2016.

In 2025, Cannon released two books in a series titled Restaurant Ridiculous. Slip and Fall Personal Injury Lawsuits (2025) and Dram Shop & Alcohol Liability Personal Injury Lawsuits (2025).

== Media ==
Cannon is frequently quoted in news articles about food safety and the restaurant business in general. He has been featured on the TV show Hotel Impossible for consulting and expert opinions for restaurants and bars featured on the series. Cannon has served as a consultant on many topics for Full-Service Restaurant (FSR) Magazine as well as Quick-Service Restaurant (QSR) Magazine and The Wall Street Journal. He has appeared in the Reader's Digest, Fox News, Attorney At Law, MSNBC, Inside Edition, and Dr. Oz.

Cannon has published articles in a variety of magazines, newspapers, blogs, and websites. He has served as a consultant on the subject of restaurant food poisoning.

== Books written ==
- The Complete Idiot's Guide to Starting Your Own Restaurant (2001)
- Stretch Yourself – Getting Promoted (2003)
- The Complete Idiot's Guide to Starting a Restaurant – 2nd Edition (2005)
- Restaurant OSHA Safety and Security: The Book of Restaurant Industry Standards and Best Practices (2016)
- Restaurant OSHA Safety and Security: Workbook and Test-Management-Level (2018)
- Restaurant OSHA Safety and Security: Workbook and Test-Employee-Level (2018)
- Restaurant Ridiculous: Slip and Fall Personal Injury Lawsuits (2025)
- Restaurant Ridiculous: Dram Shop & Alcohol Liability Personal Injury Lawsuits (2025)
