= Twins (graphic novel) =

2020 graphic novel

- Date: October 6, 2020
- Publisher: Graphix

Creative team
- Writer: Varian Johnson
- Artist: Shannon Wright
- ISBN: 978-1-338-23617-0

Twins is a 2020 graphic novel written by Varian Johnson and illustrated by Shannon Wright. It follows sixth grader Maureen, whose relationship with her twin sister Francine becomes strained when they becomes rivals for the position of school council president.

== Plot ==
On their first day in sixth grade at O'Connor Middle School, due to what Maureen believes is a computer glitch, twin sisters Maureen and Francine have different schedules for the first time, with Maureen being enrolled in Cadet Corps to her disdain. Maureen is concerned about growing apart from Francine and their friends Nikki, Tasha, and Monique and struggles with finding a new social group, while Francine, who starts going by "Fran," embraces her independence from her sister.

Fearful of receiving a B grade due to her difficulties with Cadet Corps drills, Maureen asks her instructor Master Sergeant Lucinda Fields about extra credit, to which she responds that running for student council will help. Maureen also learns from her that her parents requested she attend Cadet Corps to boost her poor self-confidence. When Maureen gets home and confronts them about it, Fran confesses she asked their parents to put them in different classes, wanting to grow more independent. Fran also plans to run for student president, and wants Maureen to apply for a different position so they can assist in each other's campaigns. Maureen decides to also run for president, but doesn't tell Fran. When candidates for the election are called, it turns out they are the only two running for the position. After the sisters get into a fight at home over the election, their parents arrange for them to work and sleep at different parts of the house. Maureen moves into the room of their adult half-brother Curtis, who has his own apartment, while Fran stays in their room.

Maureen befriends Amber and Robert, two kids for Cadet Corps, and they along with Bryce Jackson, the eighth-grader class leader of Cadet Corps that Maureen has a crush on, agree to help with her campaign. Fran ends up making a poster mocking Maureen, calling her Barf Face, referencing an incident the previous year where Maureen became sick and threw up before a big speech and Fran posed as her to the speech. The twins' parents want Fran to leave the race over the poster, but Maureen protests, feeling it would be wrong for her to win by default. Their parents agree as long as Fran only works on her campaign at Curtis' apartment.

One day after school, Maureen discovers that Fran is being tutored. Fran reveals that she has felt inferior to Maureen, who ranked top of class in elementary school, and the sisters reconcile. Later, after Maureen and Fran give their speeches to the students and voting takes place, it is revealed that Fran won the election. The book ends with Maureen, Fran, and their friends attending a school dance.

== Development ==
Johnson himself has a twin brother; as with the Carter sisters, they first started taking separate classes in middle school, an experience that inspired the story of Twins.

== Reception ==
The book received starred reviews from Kirkus Reviews, Publishers Weekly, the Horn Book, and School Library Journal. Both School Library Journal and the Horn Book likened the book to works by Raina Telgemeier and Jerry Craft. Eboni Njoku of the Horn Book commented on how the book alludes to the protagonists' Black identity through the use of hair bonnets and a scene depicting discrimination at a mall.

Avery Kaplan of Comics Beat praised the artwork, noting how early pages symmetrically presented the Maureen and Francine's perspectives with the format becoming more disjointed later on to reflect the growing conflict between the twins

=== Accolades ===
| Year | Award/Honor | Result | Ref. |
|---|---|---|---|
| 2022 | Great Graphic Novels for Teens | Included | |
| 2021 | Eisner Award for Best Publication for Kids | Shortlisted | |
| 2021 | Harvey Award for Best Children's or Young Adult Book | Shortlisted | |
| 2021 | Ringo Award for Best Kids Comic or Graphic Novel | Won | |
| 2021 | School Library Journal - Best Middle Grade Books | Included | |
| 2021 | Graphic Novels & Comics Round Table - Best Graphic Novels for Children | Top Ten | |
| 2021 | Black Caucus of the American Library Association - Children and Youth Literary Awards for Graphic Novel | Won | |
| 2020 | NPR Books We Love | Included | |
