= Sheila Lowe =

British-born novelist and graphologist

- Lowe at a book signing in Los Angeles, California in 2010
- Born: Sheila Taylor; London, England, U.K.
- Occupation: Novelist
- Writing career
- Genres: Mystery fiction, Nonfiction
- Website: sheilalowe.com

Sheila Lowe is a British-born novelist and graphologist who has lived in the United States since 1964. Her first book was published in 1999 and became a bestseller in the Complete Idiot's Guides series. Her second book was released a year later. In 2007, the first edition of Poison Pen, the beginning of her Claudia Rose forensic mystery series came out with a small publisher, Capital Crime Press. When Poison Pen received a starred review in Publishers Weekly, who called it "a dynamite debut," Kristen Weber, then-senior editor at New American Library, picked it up and published the first four books in the series. She is currently the president of the American Handwriting Analysis Foundation.

== Awards ==
- 2000 Southwest Writers Conference competition, Mystery/Suspense/Thriller category
- 2007 USA Book News, Fiction & Literature: Mystery/Suspense

== Bibliography ==
- Poison Pen ISBN 0692641599
- Written in Blood ISBN 0692641920
- Dead Write ISBN 0692724850
- Last writes: a forensic handwriting mystery ISBN 9780451231109
- Inkslingers Ball ISBN 0692216987
- Outside The Lines ISBN 1535367849
- What She Saw ISBN 0692283463
- The Complete Idiot's Guide to Handwriting Analysis ISBN 1-59257-601-X
- Handwriting of the Famous & Infamous ISBN 1-59223-959-5
