= Mel Fell =

2021 picture book by Corey R. Tabor

- Front cover showing Caldecott Honor
- Author: Corey R. Tabor
- Illustrator: Corey R. Tabor
- Language: English
- Genre: Picture book
- Publisher: Balzer + Bray
- Publication date: February 2, 2021
- Publication place: United States
- Pages: 40
- Awards: Caldecott Honor
- ISBN: 978-0-06-287801-4

Mel Fell is a children's picture book written and illustrated by Corey R. Tabor, published on February 2, 2021, by Balzer + Bray, a HarperCollins imprint. It focuses on Mel, a kingfisher, as she attempts her first flight. The book was received positively, and was the recipient of a Caldecott Honor in 2022.

== Reception ==
Publishers Weekly gave the book a starred review and praised the technique utilized by Tabor for the illustrations, commenting how they are "alive with wonderful textures and soft colors." Kirkus Reviews noted that the story, about a kingfisher plummeting towards the water below her, has a vertical format that "prompts readers to look longitudinally at each spread," which "inspires both excitement and anxiety." They concluded by saying the book could inspire young readers "to feel brave, to try, and to believe they can soar."

Kate Quealy-Gainer, writing for the Bulletin of the Center for Children's Books, commented on the book's narration, which they considered to be "lively," and the illustrations, which "confer buoyant energy." Julie Danielson, for The Horn Book Magazine, called Mel Fell a "playful and innovatively designed book" and added that having to turn the book to read it makes the story "even more dramatic."

Mel Fell was chosen by the American Library Association as one of its "Notable Children's Books" of 2021 and was also the recipient of a Caldecott Honor. It was also the category winner for Picture Books in the 2021 Barnes & Noble Children's & Young Adult Book Awards.

In 2022, the Weston Woods Studios released a 7 minute long animated film adaptation, narrated by Noah Wall with animation by Galen Fott.
