= Andrew Moodie =

Canadian stage and film actor and playwright (born 1967)

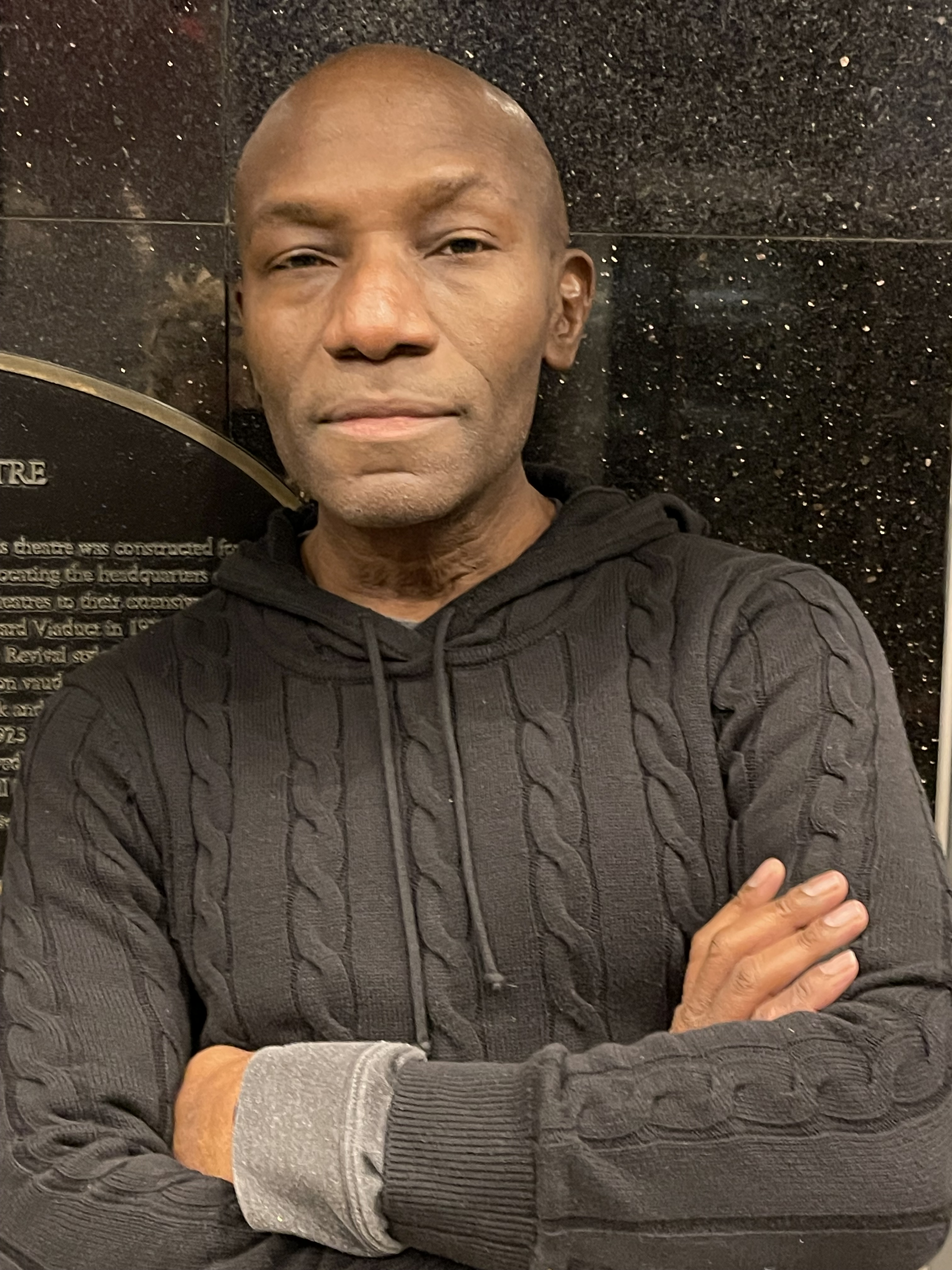
- Moodie in 2022
- Born: November 30, 1967 (age 58); Ottawa, Ontario, Canada
- Occupation: Actor
- Years active: 1987–present

Andrew Moodie (born November 30, 1967) is a Canadian actor and playwright. He is most noted for his plays Riot, which was a winner of the Floyd S. Chalmers Canadian Play Award in 1996, and Toronto the Good, which was a Dora Mavor Moore Award nominee for Best Original Play (General Theatre) in 2009.

== Early life ==
Born and raised in Ottawa, Ontario, he is the brother of actress Tanya Moodie.

== Career ==
Moodie began his career as an actor with Ottawa's Great Canadian Theatre Company in the 1980s.

His other plays have included Oui (1998), Wilbur County Blues (1998), A Common Man's Guide to Loving Women (1999), The Lady Smith (2000) and The Real McCoy (2006). He was also a writer of the CBC Radio drama series Afghanada.

As an actor, Moodie is best known for his recurring supporting roles as Simon Frontenac in Orphan Black and Teku Fonsei in Dark Matter. He won a Dora Award in the Youth Theatre division for his performance in David S. Craig and Robert Morgan's Health Class, and was nominated in the Independent division in 2003 for his performance in Othello.

From 2006 to 2011 Moodie was the host of TVOntario's documentary series Big Ideas.

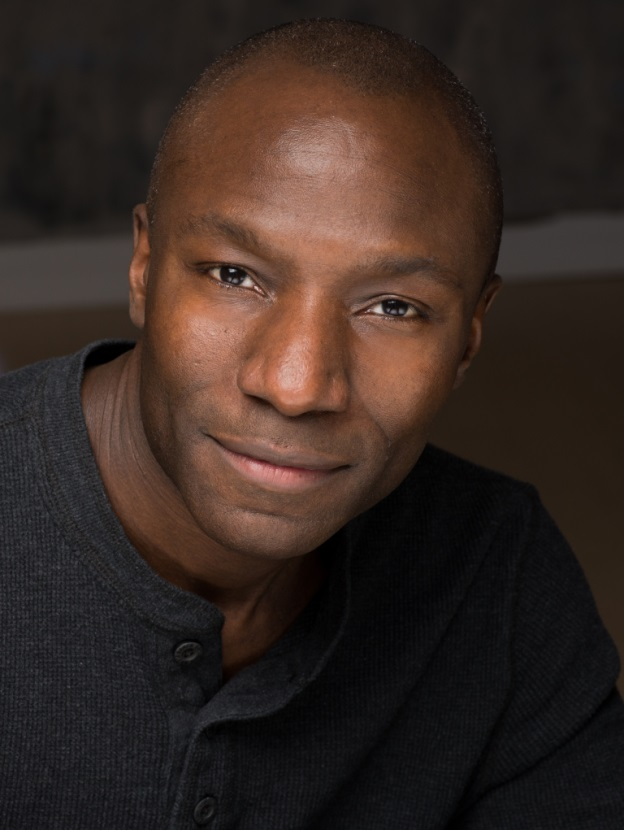
Andrew Moodie in 2013

In 2024 he had a leading role in the film The Legacy of Cloudy Falls.
