= A Little Like Magic =

2024 picture book by Sarah Kurpiel

- Author: Sarah Kurpiel
- Illustrator: Sarah Kurpiel
- Publisher: Rocky Pond Books
- Publication date: October 15, 2024
- ISBN: 978-0593697658

A Little Like Magic is a 2024 picture book by Sarah Kurpiel. It follows a young girl who goes to see ice sculptures with her mother.

== Plot ==
The book follows an unnamed girl who uses a power wheelchair. One winter day, she and her mother go to see ice sculptures being carved in the local park, which fail to impress the cold-hating girl. However, when she returns there the next night after realizing she dropped her horse figurine at the park, the completed sculptures give her a new sense of wonder and she finds her figurine by a horse-shaped sculpture.

== Reception ==
Kirkus Reviews called the book "whimsical and thoughtful." Of the art, they said "fluid illustrations clearly convey the narrator’s emotions" and "eye-catching blue and white hues immerse readers in the wintry atmosphere."

The Bulletin of the Center for Children's Books noted the casual representation of the child's disability and concluded that the book was "a sweet, thoughtful reflection on anxieties and trying new things."

The United States Board on Books for Young People included the book on its 2026 list of Outstanding Books for Young People with Disabilities.

=== Accolades ===
Year	Award	Result	Reference
2025	Schneider Family Book Award - Young Children	Won	
2025	Crystal Kite Award - Midwest	Won	
2025	Barnes & Noble Children's & Young Adult Book Award - Picture Book	Shortlisted	
