= Swim Team (graphic novel) =

2022 graphic novel by Johnnie Christmas

- Date: May 17, 2022
- Page count: 256 pages
- Publisher: HarperAlley

Creative team
- Creator: Johnnie Christmas
- ISBN: 978-0-06-305677-0

Swim Team is a 2022 graphic novel by Johnnie Christmas. It follows Bree, a girl who learns to swim and joins her school's swim team. It received widely positive reception, including winning a BCALA Literary Award and Young Reader's Choice Award and being nominated for an Eisner Award and Harvey Award .

== Plot ==
After moving to Florida from Brooklyn, Bree starts attending the swimming-obsessed Enith Brigitha Middle School, which means Bree is confronted with her own inability to swim. After being saved following falling in a pool by her elderly neighbor Ms. Etta, the two form a mentor-student relationship. In addition to covering Bree's journey in learning to swim and joining her school's swim team, the book discusses the history of swimming for Black communities in the United States, including how segregation and denial of access to swimming places resulted in stereotypes of Black people being unable to swim.

== Reception ==
The book received starred reviews from Kirkus Reviews, School Library Journal, and Publishers Weekly. Publishers Weekly noted the themes of "community, Black diasporic identity, and learning" and the "kinetic contemporary art." Bookpage stated the book "captures the fun of an athletic endeavor that can—and should—be enjoyed by everyone".

== Accolades ==
Year	Title	Award/Honor	Result	Ref.
2021	Swim Team	Dwayne McDuffie Award for Diversity in Comics	Shortlisted	
2022	Swim Team	Harvey Award for Best Children's or Young Adult Book	Shortlisted	
2022	Swim Team	Kirkus Reviews Best Middle Grade Books of the Year	Included	
2022	Swim Team	Graphic Novels & Comics Round Table's Best Graphic Novels for Children	Included	
2022	Swim Team	National Book Award for Young People's Literature	Longlisted	
2023	Swim Team	BCALA Literary Award — Children & Youth Literary Awards	Won	
2023	Swim Team	Coretta Scott King Award - Illustrator	Honored	
2023	Swim Team	Eisner Award for Best Publication for Kids	Shortlisted	
2023	Swim Team	Cybils Award for Graphic Novel	Shortlisted	
2023	Swim Team	Barnes & Noble Children's & Young Adult Book Awards - Young Readers	Shortlisted	
2023	Swim Team	Quick Picks for Reluctant Young Adult Readers	Top Ten	
2023	Swim Team	Jane Addams Children's Book Award - Book for Older Children	Honored	
2025	Swim Team	Young Reader's Choice Award - Junior Category	Won	
