= Johnnie Christmas =

American-Canadian graphic novelist

- Writing career
- Notable works: Swim Team, Gamervile
- Website: johnniechristmas.com

Johnnie Christmas is an American-Canadian author and illustrator. He is known for the graphic novels Swim Team, Gamerville, and Crema, as well as the comic series Tartarus, Alien 3, and Angel Catbird.

== Career ==
=== Graphic Novels ===
In 2020, Christmas wrote Crema, a digital graphic novel illustrated by Dante Luiz. The book is about the lesbian romance between a barista who gains the ability see ghosts when she drinks coffee and a coffee plantation heiress. Originally published exclusively online by ComiXology, a print volume was published by Dark Horse Comics in 2022.

Christmas' first child-oriented work, Swim Team, was released in 2022 through HarperAlley. The graphic novel follows Bree, a Black girl who goes from being unable to swim to joining her school's swim team with the help of her elderly neighbor, a former swimming champion. The book discusses the history of swimming for Black communities in the United States, including how segregation at swimming pools contributed to stereotypes about Black people and swimming. Reception to the book was positive, with it receiving starred reviews from Kirkus Reviews, School Library Journal, and Publishers Weekly. It won a BCALA Literary Award and Young Reader's Choice Award, and received nominations for other awards including Eisner and Harvey awards.

His next middle-grade graphic novel, Gamerville, was published in 2024 and is about Max, a video game-obsessed young boy who after being made to attend the screens-free Camp Reset for the summer conspires to escape to the Gamerville video game tournament.

=== Comics ===
In 2018, Christmas wrote Firebug, about a volcano goddess named Keegan. The work was nominated for the Joe Shuster Award for Outstanding Cartoonist.

Christmas adapted William Gibson's unproduced Alien 3 script into a five-issue comic in 2018, both writing and illustrating the work.

He is the illustrator for Margaret Atwood's Angel Catbird, which follows scientist Strig Feleedus, who is transformed into a winged cat-bird-human hybrid by an experiment gone awry and enters a secret world of animal-human hybrids.

In 2020, Christmas launched Tartarus, a science fiction Afrofuturist comic series illustrated by Jack T. Cole.

== Personal life ==
Christmas is a dual American and Canadian citizen. He was born in Puetro Rico and raised in Miami, Florida. As of 2009, he lives in Vancouver, British Columbia. He is an alumnus of Pratt Institute, and has a BFA in Communications Design.

== Publications ==
=== As Author ===
- Christmas, Johnnie (March 7, 2018). Firebug. Image Comics. ISBN 978-1534309111.
- Christmas, Johnnie (September 30, 2020). Tartarus, Vol. 1. Illustrated by Jack T. Cole. Image Comics. ISBN 978-1534316034.
- Christmas, Johnnie (April 28, 2021). Tartarus, Vol. 2: Threading The Infinite. Illustrated by Jack T. Cole. Image Comics. ISBN 978-1534317253.
- Christmas, Johnnie (February 1, 2022). Crema. Illustrated by Dante Luiz and Ryan Ferrier. Dark Horse Books. ISBN 978-1506726038.
- Christmas, Johnnie (May 17, 2022). Swim Team. HarperAlley. ISBN 978-0063056763.
- Christmas, Johnnie (July 16, 2024). Gamerville. HarperAlley. ISBN 978-0063056824.

=== As Illustrator ===
- Ed, Brisson (2013). Sheltered Volume 1. Illustrated by Johnnie Christmas. Image Comics. ISBN 978-1607068419.
- Ed, Brisson (2014). Sheltered Volume 2. Illustrated by Johnnie Christmas. Image Comics. ISBN 978-1632150998.
- Ed, Brisson (2015). Sheltered Volume 3. Illustrated by Johnnie Christmas. Image Comics. ISBN 978-1632152688.
- Wiebe, Kurtis J (2015). Pisces #1-3. Illustrated by Johnnie Christmas and Tamra Bonvillain. Shadowline.
- Atwood, Margaret (September 6, 2016). Angel Catbird Volume 1. Illustrated by Johnnie Christmas, colored by Tamra Bonvillain. Dark Horse Books. ISBN 978-1630086763.
- Atwood, Margaret (February 14, 2017). Angel Catbird Volume 2: To Castle Catula. Illustrated by Johnnie Christmas, colored by Tamra Bonvillain. Dark Horse Books. ISBN 978-1630086985.
- Atwood, Margaret (July 4, 2017). Angel Catbird Volume 3: The Catbird Roars. Illustrated by Johnnie Christmas, colored by Tamra Bonvillain. Dark Horse Books. ISBN 978-1630086992.
- Atwood, Margaret (October 16, 2018). The Complete Angel Catbird. Illustrated by Johnnie Christmas, colored by Tamra Bonvillain. Dark Horse Books. ISBN 978-1506704562.

== Accolades ==
Year	Title	Award/Honor	Result	Ref.
2019	Firebug	Joe Shuster Award for Outstanding Cartoonist	Shortlisted	
2021	Swim Team	Dwayne McDuffie Award for Diversity in Comics	Shortlisted	
2022	Swim Team	Harvey Award for Best Children's or Young Adult Book	Shortlisted	
2022	Swim Team	National Book Award for Young People's Literature	Longlisted	
2023	Swim Team	BCALA Literary Award — Children & Youth Literary Awards	Won	
2023	Swim Team	Coretta Scott King Award - Illustrator	Honored	
2023	Swim Team	Eisner Award for Best Publication for Kids	Shortlisted	
2023	Swim Team	Cybils Award for Graphic Novel	Shortlisted	
2023	Swim Team	Barnes & Noble Children's & Young Adult Book Awards - Young Readers	Shortlisted	
2023	Swim Team	Quick Picks for Reluctant Young Adult Readers	Top Ten	
2025	Swim Team	Young Reader's Choice Award - Junior Category	Won	
2025	Gamervile	NAACP Image Award for Outstanding Graphic Novel	Shortlisted	
