= Frank Sargent =

Frank or Francis Sargent may refer to:

- Frank P. Sargent (1851–1908), American trade union functionary and government official
- Frank Sargent Hoffman (1852–1928), American philosopher
- Frank Sargent (sports executive) (1902–1988), Canadian ice hockey and curling executive
- Francis Sargent (1915–1998), American politician and governor of Massachusetts
- Frank Sargent (scientist), British microbial physiologist

== See also ==
- Frank Sargeant (author), author of books on the outdoors
- Frank Sargeant (bishop) (born 1932), Anglican bishop
