= Class Act (graphic novel) =

2020 graphic novel by Jerry Craft

- Author: Jerry Craft
- Language: English
- Genre: novel
- Publisher: HarperCollins
- Publication date: 2020
- Publication place: United States
- Pages: 256
- ISBN: 978-0062885500
- Preceded by: New Kid
- Followed by: School Trip

Class Act is a 2020 graphic novel by Jerry Craft, published by Quill Tree Books/HarperAlley, imprints of HarperCollins. It is a sequel to New Kid. The story is about an eighth-grade African American student at Riverdale Academy Day School, Drew Ellis. The series talks about how Jordan feels not welcomed no matter how hard the school tries. The series includes sketches done in pencil, termed by the author to be "intermissions".

== Plot summary ==
Following the events a few months after the events of New Kid, Jordan Banks, a young African American boy, is feeling discomfort about going to eighth grade at the prestigious Riverdale Academy Day School. He has a dream to go to art school and become an artist, but his mother still wants him to go to RAD and enrolled him there last year. At school, Jordan meets up with his friends Drew and Liam. However, at school, Drew becomes annoyed when several other students attempt to touch his new hairstyle, and to add the group's problems, they meet their old enemy from last year, Andy Peterson. Drew attempts to make up with Andy, but Andy just walks off in a huff. After meeting other friends at school, Jordan and his friends go home. A few weeks later, Andy comes to Jordan's group of friends, suggesting that the group dress up as the Avengers for Halloween. When the others don't play along, Andy gets angry and walks off. On the day of Halloween, Andy is dismayed to discover that hardly any of his classmates have dressed as the Avengers. Things come to a head when Andy appears at school with his skin dyed green, as a result of a prank. Andy is then teased about it the entire day. At the end of the day, one of the teachers, Mr. Roche, asks that Drew help serve as a student ambassador for visiting students from another school, this school having mainly African American students. Things go from bad to worse when Mr. Roche is unable to pronounce the visiting students' names, and when the students are appalled at how bad their school is compared to RAD. Jordan and Drew go to Liam's house for Thanksgiving Break, but Liam feels uncomfortable when Drew questions him about his privileged lifestyle. Tension builds up between Drew and Liam, since Drew finds it hard to be with Liam, since he thinks that Liam has privileges that he could never get. Jordan finds it hard to be able to keep their friend group together. When Drew goes home, Liam's driver, Mr Pierre reminds Drew that he shouldn't let Liam's privilege change how he treats Liam. As the year finishes out, the school is called to an assembly, where they watch a movie about urban life. Drew and Jordan do not enjoy the movie, as it paints an inaccurate picture of how most African Americans live, and random students give Drew and other African American students gifts and money after the movie. Mr. Roche also attempts to start a diversity group, but the group doesn't end up accomplishing much. Drew finally tells Liam how he feels about him, and the two are able to be friends again and make up. The school also finally starts to make real efforts to make it more diverse. Jordan, Drew and Liam are finally able to be themselves around each other, and respect their differences.

== Characters ==
- Jordan Banks – The main character in the first novel New Kid
- Drew Ellis – He is the best friend of Jordan and the main character of Class Act.
- Liam Landers – A friend of Jordan and a White American. His family has a lot of money, and he also has a personal driver
- Andy Peterson – A white American who wears a MAGA hat, he was previously the quarterback of the football team but lost this role. Since Drew took it, Andy feels hostility towards Drew. Dave Kim of The New York Times felt the MAGA hat was "perhaps a bit heavy-handed".

== Reception ==
Kirkus Reviews called the work a “well-crafted, visually rich, truth-telling tale for our troubled times that affirms the eternal importance of friends."

The book was nominated for the 2021 Harvey Award for Best Children's or Young Adult Book.
