= Steven D. Strauss =

American author, columnist, and lawyer

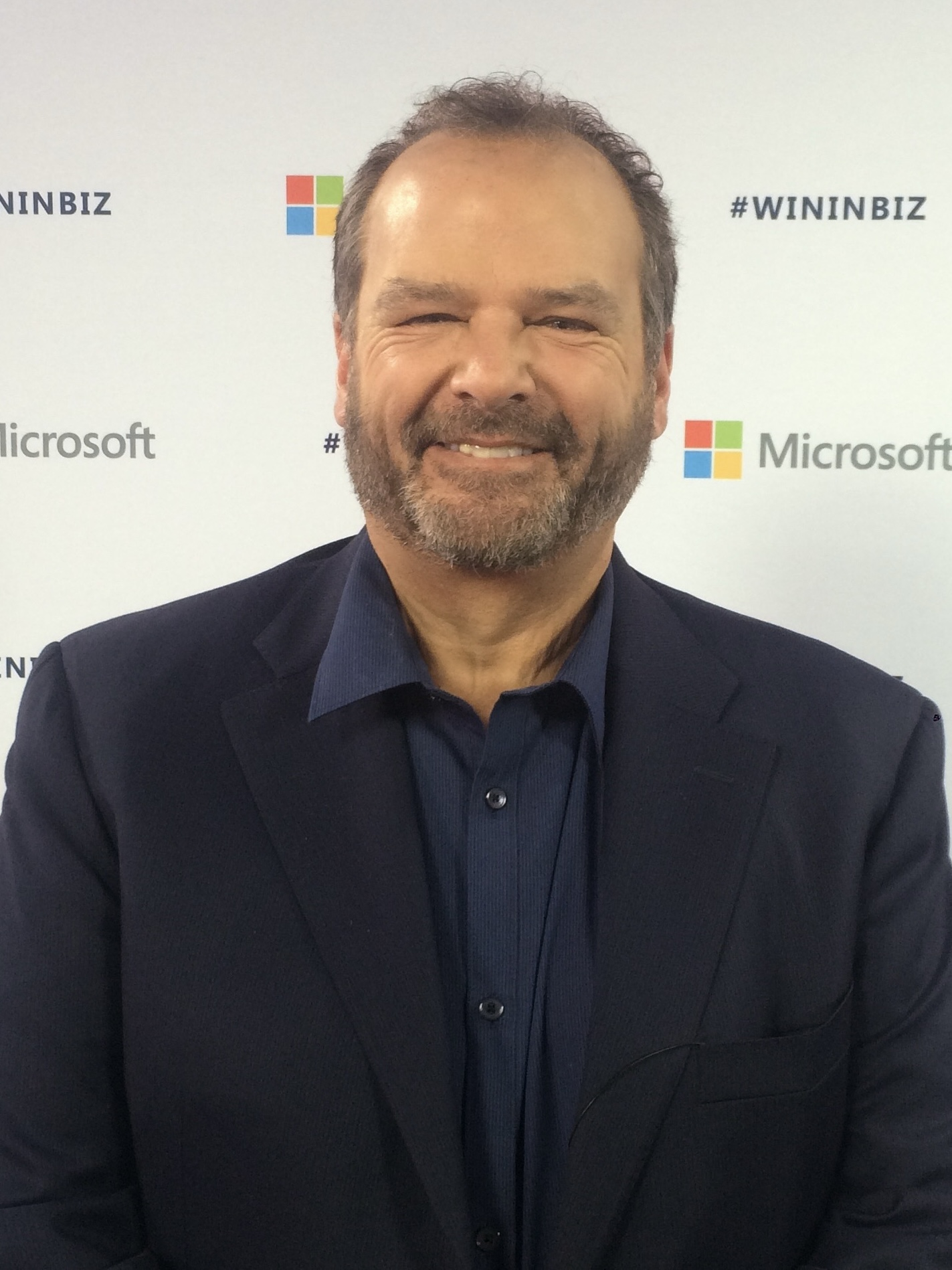
- Strauss in 2017
- Born: California, U.S.
- Other names: Steve Strauss; MrAllBiz
- Education: University of California, Los Angeles (BA); Claremont Graduate University (MPP); University of the Pacific (JD)
- Occupations: Author, columnist, lawyer
- Known for: Small business expertise
- Notable work: The Big Idea; The Small Business Bible; Your Small Business Boom
- Spouse: Maria
- Children: 3
- Website: mrallbiz.com

Steven D. Strauss is an American author, columnist, and lawyer, who has been referred to as "America's leading small business expert." He is the author of eighteen books and was a senior columnist for USA Today for more than twenty years. Strauss has written regular columns about business and entrepreneurship for Inc. and The Motley Fool.

== Early life and education ==
Strauss received his bachelor's degree in political science from the University of California, Los Angeles (UCLA) in 1981, before becoming a Coro fellow. He subsequently received a Master of Public Policy from Claremont Graduate University and a J.D. from the University of the Pacific's McGeorge School of Law.

== Career ==
Strauss began his career as an attorney, before becoming an author with the Ask A Lawyer series. He later published many other books, including a number of books in the Complete Idiot's Guides series, about topics including the National Basketball Association, the Kennedy family, and debt.

In addition to his work as an author, Strauss was a speaker engaged by the United States Department of State to discuss business and economics in countries including Jordan, Mongolia, and South Korea. In 2010, he visited the West Bank in a visit sponsored by the United States Consulate in Jerusalem, in order to conduct meetings and workshops with Palestinian business owners and entrepreneurs.

Strauss has since made numerous television and radio appearances to discuss business and the law. He was a regular guest expert on the MSNBC series Your Business.

== Personal life ==
Strauss lives in Portland, Oregon, with his wife Maria. They have three daughters, Jillian, Sydney, and Mara. His father ran a chain of carpet stores in the Southern California area.

== Bibliography ==
=== Standalone books ===
- The Unofficial Guide to Starting a Home-Based Business, Wiley, 2000
- The Big Idea: How Business Innovators Get Great Ideas to Market, Kaplan Publishing, 2001
- The Business Start-Up Kit: Everything You Need to Know About Starting and Growing Your Own Business, Kaplan Publishing, 2002
- The Small Business Bible: Everything You Need To Know To Succeed In Your Small Business, Wiley, 2004
- Get Your Business Funded: Creative Methods for Getting the Money You Need, Wiley, 2011
- Planet Entrepreneur: The World Entrepreneurship Forum’s Guide to Business Success Around the World, Wiley, 2013
- Your Small Business Boom: Explosive Ideas to Grow Your Business, Make More Money, and Thrive in a Volatile World, McGraw-Hill, 2021

=== Complete Idiot's Guides ===
- The Complete Idiot's Guide to the Impeachment of the President (with Spencer Strauss), Alpha Books, 1998
- The Complete Idiot's Guide to the Kennedys, Alpha Books, 1999
- The Complete Idiot's Guide to Beating Debt, Alpha Books, 2003
- The Complete Idiot's Guide to the NBA, Alpha Books, 2003
- The Complete Idiot's Guide to World Conflicts, Alpha Books, 2006

=== Ask A Lawyer ===
- Debt and Bankruptcy, W. W. Norton & Company, 1998
- Divorce and Child Custody, W. W. Norton & Company, 1998
- Landlord and Tenant, W. W. Norton & Company, 1998
- Wills and Trusts, W. W. Norton & Company, 1998
