= Don't Let the Forest In =

2024 novel by CG Drews

- Author: CG Drews
- Language: English
- Genre: Young adult, Body horror, LGBTQ horror
- Publisher: Feiwel & Friends
- Publication date: October 29, 2024
- ISBN: 978-1250895660

Don't Let the Forest In is a 2024 young adult horror novel by CG Drews. It follows two boys who must confront monsters from their creations after they come to life.

== Plot ==
Andrew Perrault, an Australian boy attending Wickwood Academy in the United States, enjoys creating stories featuring macabre and grotesque creatures, which his roommate Thomas Rye then illustrates as black-and-white drawings, which are featured on-page throughout the book. As Andrew deals with his estrangement from his twin sister Dove, bullying from his peers, his newfound recognition of his asexuality, and his romantic feelings for Thomas, he discovers that the monsters they made together are manifesting in real life in the academy's surrounding woods, and that Thomas has been fighting to keep them at bay. As Andrew joins him, the onslaught of monsters becomes increasingly difficult to control and his and Thomas' bodies start changing from exposure to the forest.

== Reception ==
Kirkus Reviews praised the "rich, extravagant prose," and noted how "Andrew grapples realistically with his sexual identity, and the story has ample genuinely creepy moments with the monsters."

School Library Journal gave a starred review, calling Don't Let the Forest In "an angst-fueled, twisted fairy tale wrapped tightly in dark academia, exploring the border between love and something more dangerous."

In another starred review, Kelly Ferreira of Booklist wrote that the book was "sure to please those interested in modern horror mixed with a touch of fairy tale." The book was named a 2024 Booklist Editors' Choice for Books for Youth.

=== Accolades ===
Year	Award	Category	Result	Ref
2025	Queensland Literary Awards	Young Adult	Won	
2025	Barnes & Noble Children's & Young Adult Book Awards	Young Adult	Won	
2025	Libby Book Awards	Young Adult Fiction	Shortlisted	
2024	Goodreads Choice Awards	Young Adult Fantasy	6th place	
