= Kiera Azar =

English YA fantasy author (born 1997)

- Born: 1997 (age 28–29)
- Occupations: Author; actor
- Years active: 2023–present
- Notable work: Thorn Season (2025)

Kiera Azar is an English author and actor. Her debut novel Thorn Season (2025), the first in a young adult (YA) fantasy series, became a New York Times and Sunday Times bestseller.

== Early life ==
Azar is from Surrey and of Lebanese and Indian descent. She studied biomedical sciences at university.

== Career ==
Azar appeared in the second season of the Netflix series Shadow and Bone in 2023.

Via a six-way auction in November 2024, Harper Fire (a HarperCollins imprint) acquired the rights to publish Azar's debut YA romantic fantasy novel Thorn Season in September 2025. The novel follows a magic-wielder born to a family of wielder hunters; Azar based the story on a dream. Thorn Season became a #1 New York Times bestseller in the Young Adult Hardcover category and a #2 Sunday Times bestseller in the Children's charts and #5 overall. It was also shortlisted for a Barnes & Noble Best YA Book award, was a 2026 Junior Library Guild selection in the Fantasy/Science Fiction category, and made the Kirkus Reviews list of best books of 2025.

== Books ==
=== Thorn Season series ===
- Thorn Season (2025)
- Sharpest Court (2026)
