= Varian Johnson =

American writer (born 1977)

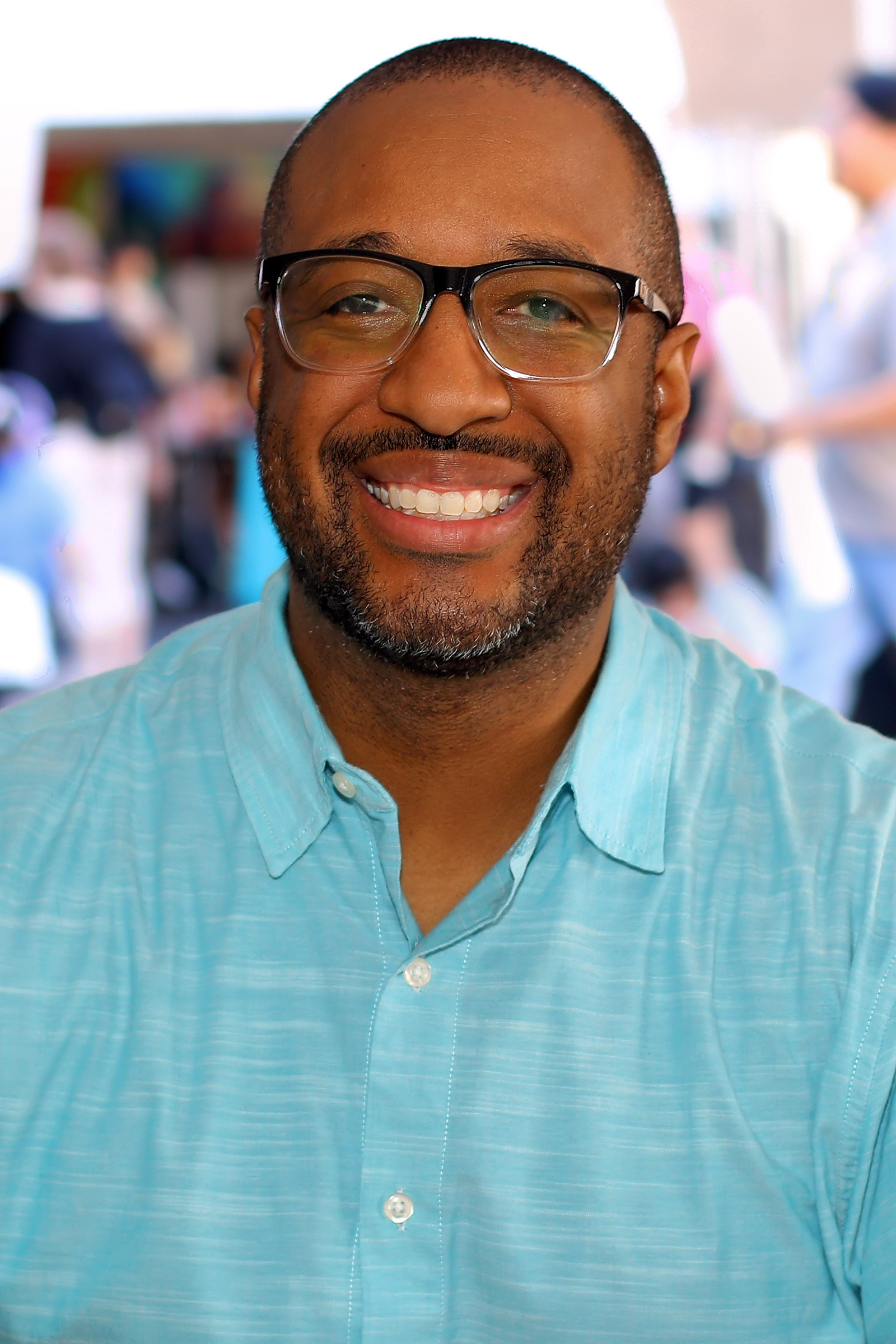
- Johnson at the 2025 Texas Book Festival
- Born: Florence, South Carolina
- Occupation: Author
- Website: www.varianjohnson.com

Varian Johnson (born in 1977) is an American writer, who writes contemporary middle grade literature. He is the author of multiple novels including My Life as a Rhombus.

== Biography ==
Johnson is a twin and the father of two daughters. He is also a member of The Brown Bookshelf, an organization that "is designed to push awareness of the myriad of African American voices writing for young authors".

== Published works ==
- A Red Polka Dot in a World Full of Plaid (2005)
  - Essence best seller list, March 2005
- My Life as a Rhombus (2008)
- Saving Maddie (2010)
  - Bank Street Best Children's Book, 2011
- Open Mic: Riffs on Life Between Cultures in Ten Voices (2013), contributor
- Things I'll Never Say: Stories About Our Secret Selves (2015), contributor
- Been There, Done That: School Dazed (2016), contributor
- The Great Greene Heist (2014)
  - Kirkus Reviews Best Book, 2014
  - ALA ALSC Notable Children's Books List, 2015
  - Bank Street Best Children's Book, 2015
- To Catch a Cheat (A Jackson Greene Novel) (2016)
- The Return (2016), Spirit Animals: Fall of the Beasts book 3
- The Wildcat's Claw (2017), Spirit Animals: Fall of the Beasts book 6
- Gabriela: Time for Change (2017), American Girl: Girl of the Year 2017 book 3
- The Parker Inheritance (2018)
  - Boston Globe-Horn Book Honor, 2018
  - Coretta Scott King Book Awards Honor, 2019
- What Were The Negro Leagues? (2019) a Who HQ series book, Penguin Workshop
- Twins (2020), illustrated by Shannon Wright
  - Eisner Award nominee
  - NPR Best Book of 2020
- Playing the Cards You’re Dealt (2021)
- Mister Miracle: The Great Escape (2022)
- Little Big Man (2025)
