= Big Ideas (TV series) =

Canadian television series

Big Ideas was a Canadian television series produced and broadcast by TVOntario, on the air since 2001. The program showcases public intellectual culture. It was conceived and produced by Wodek Szemberg. The show presented public lectures by acclaimed university educators and other distinguished guests. The original host, Irshad Manji, was succeeded by Canadian actor/director/playwright Andrew Moodie on January 7, 2006. In September 2011, Piya Chattopadhyay took over as host.

In 2007, Big Ideas held its Best Lecturer competition for the second time. Michael Persinger, from Laurentian University, received the award.

Podcasts of the lectures are available through the Big Ideas website as well as from iTunes.

Big Ideas is also the name of an unrelated PBS series that originally aired in 2003, as well as of a radio series on Australian Broadcasting Corporation's Radio National.

The show ended in spring 2013 as a result of budget cuts at TVO.
