= Big Idea (summer camp) =

- Type: International Jewish High-Tech Summer Camp
- Founded: 2007
- Founder: Dotan Tamir
- Headquarters: Meir Shfeya youth village, Israel
- Key people: Dotan Tamir (CEO); Erez Roll; Nir Gad
- Products: International Jewish Summer Camps
- Number of employees: ~50
- Parent: Project of Oranim Educational Initiatives Ltd.
- Website: bigidea.co.il

Big Idea (previously known as "eCamp") is an English speaking international Jewish summer camp located in Israel, focusing on STEM, media arts and gaming. The campers, aged 7 to 18, attend workshops in subjects such as Music, Photography, Design, Gaming, and more. Big Idea's main program blends the technological workshops with a traditional American-style summer camp experience, held in three 2-week sessions each summer. The staff includes Israeli and international counselors who speak English and Hebrew. The counselors are graduates and college students, some of whom did their military service in technology units of the Israel Defense Forces. Big Idea's current main location is Meir Shfeya, a residential youth village near Zichron Yaacov. Until the summer of 2011 it took place at the Alonei Yitzhak youth village.

== History ==
Big Idea was founded in 2007 and under the name "eCamp" as a division of Oranim Educational Initiatives Ltd. (Known today as Israel Way Educational Tourism), by Dotan Tamir and Oranim's president Shlomo (Momo) Lifshitz. The vision was to create a place for Jewish kids and teenagers from Israel and around the world where they can connect and strengthen their Jewish identity while gaining skills in the field of hi-tech.

eCamp's first session took place In summer 2008, with part of the campers coming from cities on the outskirts of the Gaza Strip. Those campers were sponsored by Jewish organizations in the United States such as the American Jewish Committee and the Jewish Federation of the Metropolitan of Detroit.

In the summer of 2009, the number of participants in the camp increased, and also included a group of teens from the Jewish Agency Partnership 2000 project, from Netivot, Israel and Philadelphia, Pennsylvania partner cities in the Jewish Agency Partnership 2000 project.

Every year since the first, eCamp saw a growth in the number of participants and variety of countries of origin.

After the summer of 2013, the name switched to "Big Idea", as a division of "Big Idea Educational Projects Ltd." (founded by Dotan Tamir and Erez Roll). Since then the camp kept growing and established other programs such as the Cyber Camp, You Camp, One World and a summer day-camp named Funzone.

== Camp program ==
Each summer there are three 2-week sessions of the camp. Between sessions the campers can join organized trips around Israel led by the camp's staff.
The camp presents different workshops, most of which are within the context of STEM while some are non-technological workshops such as surfing or martial arts. Campers in Big Idea choose 3 different workshops they want to participate in during the camp, and by the end of the session complete their own personal project in each of the different workshops. Each camper attends a daily unplugged workshops which focuses on Arts & Crafts or Sports. Moreover, the camp program includes daily outdoor activities and different social activities such as a bonfire and a pool party. Campers are segmented into 4 age groups, named Nanos Kilos Megas and Gigas which determine the campers' educational program, group activities and counselors.

== Other programs ==
In addition to the Big Idea Summer Camp, Big Idea Educational Projects established three other educational programs in Israel, all established in 2014. The first, Cyber Camp, is a camp held during the Hanukkah and passover vacations and teaches the campers about proactive cyber defense, and includes both theoretical study and practice of cyber defense in the CyberGym facility. During the same time a camp oriented about YouTube called YouCamp is also held. The third program, FunZone, is a summer day-camp held in Israel, focusing on STEM and other arts.

In 2015 Big Idea Educational Projects founded the "One World" Summer Camp in cooperation with WIZO. One World is a summer camp focusing on outdoor activities and programs such as natural arts, photography, horseback riding and survival skills. The camp takes place at Wizo Nir Ha'emek Youth Village in Israel.

Big Idea Educational Projects also holds technological courses for children in hi-tech workplaces such as Microsoft, Intel and AlphaTeam. In addition, it also conducts a gap year program. In 2018 it started a program to integrate special needs teens.
