= New Kid =

2019 graphic novel by Jerry Craft

- Author: Jerry Craft
- Language: English
- Publisher: HarperCollins
- Publication date: February 5, 2019
- Publication place: United States
- Pages: 256
- Awards: Newbery Medal; Coretta Scott King Award; Kirkus Prize for Young Readers' Literature
- ISBN: 978-0-06-269120-0
- Followed by: Class Act

New Kid is a 2019 graphic novel by Jerry Craft. The novel tells the story of a 12-year-old African American boy named Jordan Banks who experiences culture shock when he enrolls at a private school. During Jordan's 7th grade (first form) year at the prestigious school, he adjusts to a new learning environment, witnesses and experiences microaggressions, and makes friends with other students. The book is semi-autobiographical, as Craft based the book on his own private school experiences as well as those of his two sons. While he wishes the book to be appreciated by a wide range of readers, Craft particularly wants it to accurately reflect a present-day African American experience.

The book was well received by critics, sold well, and won the 2020 Newbery Medal and Coretta Scott King Award and the 2019 Kirkus Prize for Young Readers' Literature. It was the first graphic novel to be awarded the Newbery Medal. The book's illustrations, using a unique number of graphical styles, helped to achieve a balance between the book's humorous and dramatic elements. Its critical and award successes were viewed at the time as an important achievement for graphic novels. A sequel titled Class Act was released on October 6, 2020. A third book in the series, School Trip, was released on April 4, 2023.

== Plot ==
12-year-old Jordan Banks is a black boy who lives in Washington Heights. Jordan loves art and makes cartoons about his life. His dream is to go to art school. However, his mother makes him go to Riverdale Academy Day (RAD) School, which she calls "one of the best schools in the state". However, RAD is not a very diverse school, having only a few black students.

During his first day at Riverdale, Jordan is overwhelmed. He is helped by Liam Landers, a fellow student assigned to be Jordan's guide, and whose family has attended RAD (Riverdale Academy Day) for 3 generations. The two become friends. Jordan meets a variety of other students at the school, including Drew Ellis and Maury, who are two of the few African American students at his school; Andy Peterson, an obnoxious jock who is disliked by many of his fellow students; and Alexandra, a girl who always wears a sock puppet on her hand.

Jordan has some difficulties adjusting to RAD. These include sitting at the wrong table at lunch and not knowing how to act when a friend from the neighborhood sees him with Liam. Further challenges occur when his homeroom teacher, Ms. Rawle, discusses students on financial aid and calls Drew by the name of DeAndre another Black student she formerly taught. Jordan discovers that this kind of misnaming happens to other black students and faculty at the school, even a black teacher who has been at the school for fourteen years.

Things start to slowly improve for Jordan. Forced to pick a team sport to play, Jordan chooses soccer and struggles with the rules and the cold, and scores an accidental goal in his first game. He also can have honest conversations with Drew about what it's like to be one of the few African Americans at RAD and become friends with him. His friendship with Liam also deepens after he goes to his house and they play video games. Liam gives him a pair of pink shorts that everyone at RAD wears for Christmas. After a discussion with his grandfather, Jordan successfully mixes both his school friends through video games. However, after Jordan corrects his neighborhood friends' grammar they give him the nickname "Private School".

Jordan's life continued to be ups and downs for Jordan at school academically and socially. At first, Jordan dislikes his art teacher because she is teaching modern art, though later he comes to understand that modern art is not that bad and that his teacher can paint normal art too. While waiting to be picked up one day, Jordan learns that Alexandra wears a sock puppet because she does not want anyone to see the burns on her hand, burns that she sustained preventing her younger brother from being scalded by a pot of boiling water. However, the burns were not severe; through a clever ruse, Jordan divulged the details of Alexandra's burn, which led to her greater acceptance among her peers. After ongoing tension between Drew and Andy, starting from when Drew beat Andy for a position on the football team, Andy dares Drew to join the baseball team, which he does, and ends up being benched all season because he does not know how to play baseball. When Drew and Andy get into an argument in the cafeteria, Andy slips on an apple and falls, but Ms. Rawle initially accuses Drew of pushing him. However, Jordan and several other classmates stick up for Drew, stopping him from being sent to the headmaster.

As the school year draws to a close, Jordan's modern art illustration is picked for the cover of the yearbook. Drew, Liam, and Jordan have become good friends and on the last day of school Jordan even wears the pair of pink shorts that Liam gave him at Christmas. Jordan spreads the info about the hand burn to Alexandra's friends. As a result, Alexandra tells him she was about to be mad at him for revealing the burn before realizing he had done this to help her. Drew remains unsure if he will return to RAD, almost having been suspended despite making the honor roll each semester. The book ends with Jordan with his neighborhood friends as they start their summer.

== Background and release ==
Author Jerry Craft described wanting to put as much into the book as he could, as he was unsure if he'd get a similar opportunity in the future, "By the end, it was like overpacking a suitcase — I had to kind of sit on it to zip it up, because I was trying to put so much in for so many different people." He expressed appreciation for the support his publisher, HarperCollins, gave him in trying to execute this vision.

Riverdale Academy Day School is loosely based on Ethical Culture Fieldston School which Craft attended in high school. Craft also cited Schoolhouse Rock! and Fat Albert and the Cosby Kids as inspirations. He hoped that kids and adults would find the book equally entertaining. His goal with New Kid was to create a character in Jordan with universal appeal. However, writing a book that reflected the modern African American experience for African American readers was at the heart of why Craft wanted to write the book. Craft credits his experience as a syndicated cartoonist with giving him experience to make the book humorous. It was important to Craft that the book was funny because "I think that as a people we have gotten so complacent in misery that we almost expect it" when it comes to portrayals of African Americans. He felt his cartoon work also gave him experience in tackling serious topics in "palatable" ways.

The character of Jordan draws on traits from both Craft and his two sons. Craft also drew on his sons' experiences in private schools. He made some major revisions to the book after showing it to his two college-aged children. His sons' experiences were important in helping in Craft's goal of having a contemporary rather than historical setting. Craft talked with some of the teachers whom he'd parodied, who expressed that they learned something after reading the book.

The book and audiobook were published on February 5, 2019.

== Themes ==
The book explores identity, cross-racial friendships, and the effects of microaggressions. By having Jordan get along better with Liam than Maury, Craft wished to show that friendships don't have to be based solely on race. Elizabeth Bird, writing for School Library Journal, writes that, "Craft gathers together every possible microaggression in his arsenal and weaves them into a comprehensive story." She goes on to write about the various ways that well-meaning adults and obnoxious children can make a school uncomfortable for minorities.

It also works as a traditional coming-of-age and school story. Author Katie Egan writing in School Library Journal writes, "Craft has taken the daily dramas of middle school life (cafeteria hierarchy, social anxieties, and tween hallway banter) to an arresting and devastatingly accurate new level." In The New York Times, author Victoria Jamieson notes that Jordan has to find his own way between his neighborhood and his school with his parents giving different examples of what that can look like; his mom works in the corporate world, while his dad runs a community center. Jamieson also cites the advice Jordan's grandfather gives him. The story is focussed on Jordan's struggle to fit-in in a new school where diversity is low.

== Writing and illustrations ==
The graphic novel format allows for extra content for readers to interpret the actions and intents of the characters. It can also show how Jordan is feeling, as when he is shown to be the size of an ant when he first enters the cafeteria. The book uses a variety of graphic styles, including black and white drawings to represent Jordan's sketchbook, and full-color graphics with extra design elements like emojis, in other places. Each new chapter is introduced through a humorous two-page spread. Such humorous elements also help to provide balance for the serious elements of the story.

Critics felt that some elements of the book worked better than others. Bird noted the episodic format of the book and how certain plot points seemed underdeveloped or unrealistic. Gretchen Hardin in School Library Journal praised the black and white drawings for the expressive way they develop Jordan's character while suggesting that "the art loses a bit of detail during crowd scenes."

== Awards and reception ==
The book became a New York Times bestseller. The book was generally well reviewed, receiving a starred review in School Library Journal and Publishers Weekly. The Horn Book Magazine wrote that the graphic novel "stands out as a robust, contemporary depiction of a preteen navigating sometimes hostile spaces yet staying true to himself thanks to friends, family, and art." Bird noted how New Kid is the rare graphic novel to have a non-superhero contemporary black teen as a protagonist. Common Sense Media wrote in its review, "The move to middle school confuses many students and has inspired many comics, but this funny and heartfelt graphic novel covers new territory." Wesley Jacques writing in The Bulletin of the Center for Children's Books, criticized the book's "uneven pacing and inconsistency in illustration" and for its failure to explore the colorism faced by darker skinned characters. The New York Times named it one of the best children's books of 2019 and Polygon labeled it one of the 50 best graphic novels for kids.

The book won the 2020 Newbery Medal and Coretta Scott King Award, which was seen as part of an awards "breakthrough" for graphic novels. It was the first graphic novel to be awarded the Newbery Medal. Craft had been hopeful New Kid would be recognized with the Newbery Medal after it did well in several mock Newbery Awards and was shocked when he received a second phone call informing him about the Coretta Scott King Award win. Krishna Grady, chair of the 2020 Newbery committee, praised the book in announcing its win, "Respectful of its child audience, it explores friendship, race, class and bullying in a fresh and oftentimes humorous manner." The book also won the 2020 Kirkus Prize.

== Controversy and ban of the book ==
In the context of a backlash against racial justice protests in the U.S., New Kid was accused of promoting critical race theory and racism. This accusation is unsubstantiated, as author Jerry Craft was not even aware of the academic theory when writing the book. In 2020, a Pennsylvania school district banned the book as an educational resource together with other anti-racism books. This ban was overturned in September 2021 after protests by parents and students. The school district in Katy, Texas, banned the book, and postponed a virtual talk by Craft to elementary school students scheduled to take place in October 2021. The removal of the book from the curriculum of Katy Independent School District followed a mobilization by parents, who signed a Change.org online petition alleging that the book violated a new state law on how American history should be portrayed in schools.

== Film adaptation ==
A movie based on New Kid was announced on August 5, 2020. The book’s rights were purchased by Universal Pictures and will be produced by LeBron James and Maverick Carter with their company SpringHill Entertainment. Prentice Penny will direct the movie using a script by Eli Wilson Pelton.

Awards
Preceded by Merci Suárez Changes Gears	Newbery Medal recipient 2020	Succeeded by When You Trap a Tiger
Preceded by The Undefeated	Coretta Scott King Award winner 2020	Succeeded by Before the Ever After
