= The Big Idea (game) =

The Big Idea is a 2000 game published by Cheapass Games.

== Gameplay ==
The Big Idea is a game in which the players are venture capitalists who use noun cards and adjective cars to create companies.

== Reviews ==
- Pyramid
- Backstab
