= Jerry Craft =

American cartoonist and illustrator (born 1963)

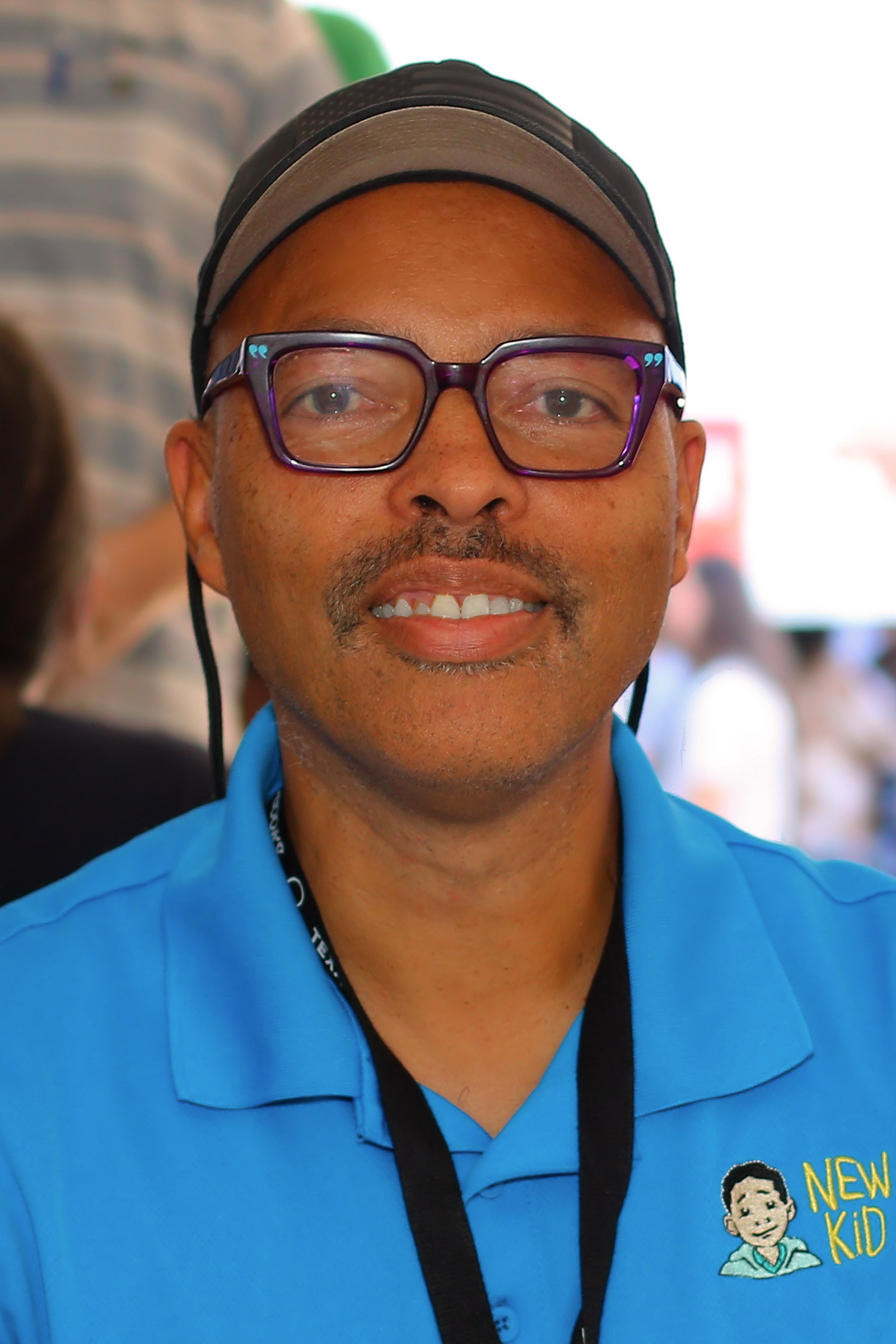
- Craft at the 2025 Texas Book Festival.
- Born: January 22, 1963 (age 63) New York City, U.S.
- Area: Cartoonist
- Notable works: Mama's Boyz; New Kid
- Awards: Glyph Awards (2013); Newbery Medal (2020)

Jerry Craft (born January 22, 1963) is an American cartoonist and children's book illustrator known for his syndicated newspaper comic strip Mama's Boyz and his graphic novels New Kid, Class Act, and School Trip. Craft is one of only a handful of syndicated African American cartoonists in the US.

== Early life and education ==
Craft was born January 22,1963, in New York. He grew up in Washington Heights, attended the Ethical Culture Fieldston School, and graduated from the School of Visual Arts in 1984 with a Bachelor of Fine Arts in Media Arts.

== Career ==
Craft worked for twelve years as a copywriter for various advertising agencies, during which time he also got his first comics work on projects for Marvel Comics and Harvey Comics. Moving on to King Features Syndicate, Craft spent eight years writing sales brochures. This connection with King Features led to the syndication of Craft's Mama's Boyz beginning in 1995.

Craft later worked as editorial director of the Sports Illustrated for Kids website where he was nominated for a New Media Award by the National Cartoonists Society for his series of popular Flash cartoons. He left that job in October 2006 to become a full-time cartoonist.

Craft performs regular cartooning workshops at schools, camps, and libraries.

On January 27, 2020, New Kid was awarded the Newbery Medal, becoming the first graphic novel to receive this honor. New Kid also won the 2020 Coretta Scott King Author Award and the Kirkus Prize.

=== Mama's Boyz ===
Mama's Boyz follows the lives of African American single mother Pauline Porter and her two teenage sons Tyrell and Yusuf. Other characters include Pauline's brother Greg and their parents.

Mama's Boyz is the outgrowth of a prior strip called The Outside View, which Craft first self-syndicated in 1987. In 1990, he adapted some elements of The Outside View to create Mama's Boyz, which he self-syndicated to New York's The City Sun and eventually a number of other weekly papers across the country. In 1995, Mama's Boyz was picked up for weekly syndication by King Features.

Mama's Boyz has been praised in Great Books for African American Children, and featured in Chicken Soup for the African American Soul, Chicken Soup for the African American Woman's Soul, and The Complete Idiot's Guide to Comedy Writing. The Mama's Boyz characters also act as official "spokescharacters" of the American Diabetes Association's African-American Program.

=== New Kid ===
Published in 2019, New Kid tells the story of Jordan Banks, an African-American seventh grader who begins attending a predominantly white, affluent, private school. The book is a partially autobiographical coming of age novel. As one of the few African-American students at his school, Jordan has to face daily microagressions.

== Personal life ==
Craft had two sons, Jaylen and Aren. Aren died on February 8, 2024; he was 24 years old. Before his death, he and his brother co-wrote the book The Offenders: Saving the World While Serving Detention! with their father. Craft lives in Orlando, Florida.

== Awards ==
- 2020 Newbery Medal for New Kid
- 2013 Glyph Awards — Best Comic Strip or Webcomic for Mama's Boyz
- 2009 African American Literary Awards Show Open Book Awards
- 2007 Conversation Starter award — DC Campaign to Prevent Teenage Pregnancy
- 2004 African American Literary Awards Show Open Book Awards
- American Diabetes Association Outstanding Supporter Award (2x)
- National Cartoonists Society — nominated

== Bibliography ==
- (written with Jaylen Craft & Aren Craft) The Offenders: Saving the World While Serving Detention! (Mama's Boyz, Inc., 2014)
- New Kid (Quill Tree Books, 2019)
- Class Act (Quill Tree Books, 2020)
- School Trip (Quill Tree Books, 2023)

=== Mama's Boyz collections ===
- As American as Sweet Potato Pie! (American Publishing Company, 1997)
- Home Schoolin' – Because Learning Shouldn't Stop at 3 O'Clock (Mama's Boyz, Inc., 2007) — endorsed by both Teachers Against Prejudice and Comics in the Classroom
- The Big Picture: What you Need to Succeed! (Mama's Boyz, Inc., 2010)

=== As illustrator ===
- (with writer Lori Nelson) Hillary's Big Business Adventure (Nelson Publishing, 2008)
- (with writer Margo Candelario) Looking to the Clouds for Daddy (Karen Hunter Media, 2009)
- (with writer David Miller) Khalil's Way (Urban Leadership Institute, 2012)
