= The Lost Dreamer =

2022 debut novel by Lizz Huerta

- Front cover art for the book The Lost Dreamer.
- Author: Lizz Huerta
- Cover artist: Samuel Rodriguez
- Language: English
- Genre: Young adult fantasy
- Publisher: Farrar Straus Giroux
- Publication date: 2022
- Publication place: United States
- Media type: Novel
- Pages: 384
- ISBN: 978-1-25075485-1

The Lost Dreamer is a young adult fantasy debut novel written by American writer Lizz Huerta. It was published by Farrar Straus Giroux in March 2022.

== Background ==
The idea for the novel came about through Huerta's recurring dreams that she's had since she was a teenager. Huerta, who is of Mexican, Puerto Rican and Indigenous descent, describes the want to create a world in the fantasy genre that felt like Mesoamerica and was representative of her lineage. She utilized visualization meditation as a writing tool when creating The Lost Dreamer.

The story of The Lost Dreamer was written originally written as two different books. Huerta rewrote these two books into one in the style of a dual narrative during the COVID pandemic.

Huerta has stated that her writing is influenced by The Clan of the Cave Bear books by Jean M. Auel.

== Plot summary ==
The book is narrated by two characters alternating in twenty-two chapters. It is the story of Indir and Saya, women born with the gift of entering the Dream, and their roles in finding the Lost Dreamer. The story takes place in a Mesoamerican-inspired world.

Indir is born to a lineage of female Dreamers from the city of Alcanzeh. Indir loses her ability to Dream after Dreaming for King Anz the night he died. The last night Indir enters the Dream, she sees Alcan, the son of King Anz, burning his chest, over a sphere of water with the reflection of the mark of the Twin Serpents, calling into question the legitimacy of Alcan’s right as future king. Indir’s aunts, Kupi and Ixara, Dream that Indir will lose what she loves most, that she must leave Alcanzeh, and return when she has found the Lost Dreamer. Alcan arrives in Alcanzeh, with an army of Fire warriors and is unwilling to participate in the rituals of the Dreamers. Instead, Alcan demands that a sacrificial game be played between the Fire warriors and the Avex warriors. Alcan’s brother, Inkop, will fight for the Fire warriors and Ovis, son of Tavovis, will fight for the Avex warriors. Kupi and Ixara are assumed to be dead after their hair and blood are found on the altar of the Two Serpents. Indir leaves Alcanzeh in disguise with the help of Raru, an Ilkan protector of Dreamers, Dua, a temple worker with the gift of fire and Avex Warrior Ovis, her chosen.

Indir gives birth to a Dreamer, Saya, named after Ovis’s mother. Shortly after her birth, Saya is kidnapped by Celay, a woman who helped aid the birth Saya. Indir searches for Saya but is unable to track her because of a protective necklace that was placed on her at birth. Indir finally finds Saya as a young woman washed ashore with two other travelers.

Saya is self-taught in Dreaming. Saya is raised by a cruel woman named Celay, who lies to others by claiming to heal by abusing Saya’s gifts. Celay tricks a woman, Ruta, who is trying to conceive by giving her a root that is meant to prevent conception. Saya defies Celay by telling Ruta the truth about what Celay has done. Ruta and her chosen partner, Kinet, befriend Saya. Saya, Kinet and Ruta discover a Story written on the walls of a temple involving a comet. Saya’s protective necklace is taken by a large bird while Celay is away from the village. While Dreaming, Saya sees a man singing who knows her name. She realizes that the man is her father and that he loves her, contrary to the story Celay told her about her birth. Saya accompanies Kinet and Ruta to the Night Bird Ceremony, a ritual for queer families to conceive. Nahi, an Ilkan woman, finds Saya at the ceremony and warns her that she is in danger. Saya decides to leave with Nahi for protection.

While traveling through the jungle, Saya discovers that she has the gift of healing and the gift of communicating with plants through Song. Saya and Nahi reach the coast and are met by Akhal and her daughter Yixu, who offer to travel with them across the water. The travelers are attacked by a spider monster amidst an unnatural storm. Nahi is taken into the sea by the monster and Akhal succumbs to a coma after ardently defending the boat. When they reach land, a woman cooks for Saya and Yixu as they look after Akhal. When Akhal awakes she speaks the woman’s name-Indir. Indir tells Saya that she is her birth mother. Saya takes Indir into the Dream using a piliti root infusion. They see Indir’s sisters, Delu and Zeri, who warn them not to return the Alcanzeh. At the end of the novel, Saya decides that she will follow the Story and return to Alcanzeh and asks Indir if she will come with her.

== Genre ==
The Lost Dreamer is written in the genre of young adult fantasy. Huerta set the coming of age story in a Mesoamerican inspired world. Huerta centered women in her story as the leading characters, while men were written in supportive roles or as antagonists to the main characters to convey how, as described by Alex Brown of Locus Magazine, "patriarchy destroys everything it touches."

The Lost Dreamer is described as a love story to family and to the strong women in the author's life. The narrative explores the relationship between gifts and how they are manifested within and outside of tradition and practice.

== Publication ==
The novel was published by Farrar Straus Giroux Books for Young Readers in March 2022 in the formats of hardcover, paperback, audiobook, and e-book. The audiobook is narrated by Elisa Melendez and Inés del Castillo. The book cover illustrations were done by illustrator Samuel Rodriguez. The Lost Dreamer is the first novel in a duology with the second novel expected to be published in 2023.

== Reception ==
Daniel A. Olivas of the Los Angeles Review of Books described The Lost Dreamer as "a stunning debut novel by a writer who is in total control." Entertainment Weekly writer Seija Rankin wrote that it was the "buzziest fantasy debut of the spring." Reviewer Alex Brown of Locus Magazine described it as a "vibrant novel that focused on the importance of the tradition and the love of family."

Writer for The San Diego Union-Tribune, Seth Combs, commented on how Huerta flipped two common tropes of young adult fiction by not depending on romance to drive the plot, and for not heavily relying on action sequences or plot twists. Combs wrote the book relies on "Huerta's talent as a storyteller to build and sustain the reader's interest."

The Lost Dreamer was featured in the top 10 of the New York Public Library's 50 Best Books for Teens.
