= Complete Idiot's Guides =

Reference book series

The Complete Idiot's Guides ("The Idiot's Guide to ..." series) is a product line of how-to and other reference books published by Dorling Kindersley (DK). The books in this series provide a basic understanding of a complex and popular topics. The term "idiot" is used as hyperbole, to reassure readers that the guides will be basic and comprehensible, even if the topics seem intimidating. The approach relies on explaining a topic step-by-step, using basic terminology, definitions of words, and profiles of people.

The first Complete Idiot's Guides were published in 1993 on MS-DOS and IBM PC compatibles. They have since expanded into a wide range of topics such as time management, learning languages such as Spanish, public speaking, and feng shui. Circa 2000, there were approximately 3 million Complete Idiot's Guides sold per year.

Alpha Books, publisher of the Complete Idiot's Guides, is a member of Penguin Group. It began as a division of Macmillan. Pearson Education acquired Macmillan General Reference (MGR) from Simon & Schuster in 1998 and retained the line while the rest of MGR was sold to IDG Books. Alpha moved from Pearson Education to Penguin Group in 2003. Alpha became part of sister company DK in 2012, and relaunched the Complete Idiot's Guide series under the name "Idiot's Guide" in 2013.

Notable authors of Complete Idiot's Guides include Cory Doctorow, Thomas David Jones, Steven D. Strauss, Sheila Lowe, Taylor Mason, John Kenrick, Roshumba Williams, and Frank Sargeant.

The line parallels the For Dummies books. The editorial offices for the two competing series are both located partially in Indianapolis.

Title	ISBN
The Complete Idiot's Guide Dream Dictionary: Discover the Meaning of Over 1,500 Dream Symbols	ISBN 9781592575756
The Complete Idiot's Guide Healing to Back Pain	ISBN 9780028631158
Complete Idiot's Guide to Mac OS X	ISBN 9780789725288
The Complete Idiot's Guide Music Dictionary	ISBN 9781592579976
The Complete Idiot's Guide to 2012: An Ancient Look at a Critical Time	ISBN 9781592578030
The Complete Idiot's Guide to 40,000 Baby Names	ISBN 9781592578412
The Complete Idiot's Guide to a Smart Vocabulary	ISBN 9780028639970
The Complete Idiot's Guide to Adoption	ISBN 9780028621081
The Complete Idiot's Guide to a Healthy Cat	ISBN 9781582450575
The Complete Idiot's Guide to a Healthy Relationship	ISBN 9780028610870
The Complete Idiot's Guide to Alchemy: The Magic and Mystery of the Ancient Craft Revealed for Today	ISBN 9781592577354
The Complete Idiot's Guide to Algebra	ISBN 9781592571611
The Complete Idiot's Guide to Amazing Sex	ISBN 9780028629025
The Complete Idiot's Guide to American Cooking	ISBN 9780028643915
The Complete Idiot's Guide To American Government	ISBN 9781592573288
The Complete Idiot's Guide to American Heroes	ISBN 9780028633770
The Complete Idiot's Guide to American Literature	ISBN 9780028633787
The Complete Idiot's Guide to American Literature	ISBN 9780028633787
The Complete Idiot's Guide to Amigurumi	ISBN 9781615640034
The Complete Idiot's Guide to Ancient Egypt	ISBN 9780028642772
The Complete Idiot's Guide to Ancient Greece	ISBN 9781592572731
The Complete Idiot's Guide to Art Appreciation	ISBN 9780028639475
The Complete Idiot's Guide to Asian Cooking	ISBN 9780028643847
The Complete Idiot's Guide to Assertiveness	ISBN 9780028619644
The Complete Idiot's Guide to Astrology	ISBN 9780028619514
The Complete Idiot's Guide to Astronomy	ISBN 9780028621203
The Complete Idiot's Guide to Auto Repair and Maintenance	ISBN 9781615647620
The Complete Idiot's Guide to Baby Sign Language	ISBN 9781592574698
The Complete Idiot's Guide to Baking	ISBN 9780028619545
The Complete Idiot's Guide to Ballroom Dancing	ISBN 9780028643458
The Complete Idiot's Guide to Bartending	ISBN 9781592574124
The Complete Idiot's Guide to Baseball	ISBN 9780028629513
The Complete Idiot's Guide to Basketball	ISBN 9780028626796
The Complete Idiot's Guide to Beading Basics	ISBN 9781615641369
The Complete Idiot's Guide to Beanie Babies	ISBN 9780028632728
The Complete Idiot's Guide to Beating Debt	ISBN 9780028627328
The Complete Idiot's Guide to Beautiful Skin	ISBN 9780028624082
The Complete Idiot's Guide to Beekeeping	ISBN 9781615640119
The Complete Idiot's Guide to Being Psychic	ISBN 9780028629049
The Complete Idiot's Guide to Being Vegetarian	ISBN 9780028628790
The Complete Idiot's Guide to Bike Maintenance and Repair	ISBN 9780028641393
The Complete Idiot's Guide to Bridge	ISBN 9780028617350
The Complete Idiot's Guide to Bringing Up Baby	ISBN 9780028619576
The Complete Idiot's Guide to British Royalty	ISBN 9780028623467
The Complete Idiot's Guide to Budgeting for the Perfect Wedding	ISBN 9780028633664
The Complete Idiot's Guide to Building Your Own Home	ISBN 9780028643113
The Complete Idiot's Guide to Business Statistics	ISBN 9780028639871
The Complete Idiot's Guide to Buying a Computer	ISBN 9780789717993
The Complete Idiot's Guide to Buying and Selling Collectibles	ISBN 9780028615950
The Complete Idiot's Guide to Buying and Selling a Home	ISBN 9781567615104
The Complete Idiot's Guide to Buying or Leasing a Car	ISBN 9780028612744
The Complete Idiot's Guide to Calculus	ISBN 9780028643656
The Complete Idiot's Guide to Car Repair	ISBN 9780028620145
The Complete Idiot's Guide to Cashing in on Your Inventions	ISBN 9780028642208
The Complete Idiot's Guide to Celtic Wisdom	ISBN 9780028644172
The Complete Idiot's Guide to Change Management	ISBN 9780028641775
The Complete Idiot's Guide to Changing Careers	ISBN 9780028619774
The Complete Idiot's Guide to Cheeses of the World	ISBN 9781592577149
The Complete Idiot's Guide to Chemistry	ISBN 9781592571017
The Complete Idiot's Guide to Chess	ISBN 9780028617367
The Complete Idiot's Guide to Child Safety	ISBN 9780028636306
The Complete Idiot's Guide to Choosing a College Major	ISBN 9781592576852
The Complete Idiot's Guide to Choosing Pet	ISBN 9780876053416
The Complete Idiot's Guide to Choosing, Training, & Raising a Dog	ISBN 9780028610986
The Complete Idiot's Guide to Cigars	ISBN 9780028619750
The Complete Idiot's Guide to Classic Movies	ISBN 9781592575572
The Complete Idiot's Guide to Classical Music	ISBN 9780028616346
The Complete Idiot's Guide to Classical Mythology	ISBN 9780028623856
The Complete Idiot's Guide to Coaching for Excellence	ISBN 9781592577835
The Complete Idiot's Guide to Coaching Youth Basketball	ISBN 9781592570560
The Complete Idiot's Guide to Coaching Youth Soccer	ISBN 9781592570577
The Complete Idiot's Guide to College Planning	ISBN 9781567615081
The Complete Idiot's Guide to College Survival	ISBN 9780028641690
The Complete Idiot's Guide to Comfort Food	ISBN 9781592573714
The Complete Idiot's Guide to Computer Basics	ISBN 9780028642307
The Complete Idiot's Guide to Connecting with Your Angels	ISBN 9781592578788
The Complete Idiot's Guide to Conquering Allergies and Asthma	ISBN 9780028639314
The Complete Idiot's Guide to Conversational Sign Language	ISBN 9781592572557
The Complete Idiot's Guide to Cooking Basics	ISBN 9780028619743
The Complete Idiot's Guide to Cooking Chicken	ISBN 9780028623313
The Complete Idiot's Guide to Cooking Pasta	ISBN 9780028623306
The Complete Idiot's Guide to Cooking Science and Techniques	ISBN 9780028644264
The Complete Idiot's Guide to Cooking Soups	ISBN 9780028628615
The Complete Idiot's Guide to Cooking Substitutions	ISBN 9781592576999
The Complete Idiot's Guide to Cooking with Kids	ISBN 9780028635255
The Complete Idiot's Guide to Cooking with Mixes	ISBN 9781592571420
The Complete Idiot's Guide to Copywriter's Words and Phrases	ISBN 9781592574254
The Complete Idiot's Guide to Couponing	ISBN 9781615641536
The Complete Idiot's Guide to Cover and Bake Meals	ISBN 9781592573714
The Complete Idiot's Guide to Crafts with Kids	ISBN 9780028624068
The Complete Idiot's Guide to Creating a Graphic Novel	ISBN 9781592572335
The Complete Idiot's Guide to Creating a Social Network	ISBN 9781615640607
The Complete Idiot's Guide to Creating a Website	ISBN 9781592577880
The Complete Idiot's Guide to Creating an HTML Web Page	ISBN 9780789722560
The Complete Idiot's Guide to Creative Writing	ISBN 9780028617343
The Complete Idiot's Guide to Cultural Etiquette	ISBN 9780028633961
The Complete Idiot's Guide to Dating	ISBN 9780028610528
The Complete Idiot's Guide to Dealing With In-Laws	ISBN 9780028621074
The Complete Idiot's Guide to Decorating Basics	ISBN 9781592571758
The Complete Idiot's Guide to Decorating Your Home	ISBN 9780028610887
The Complete Idiot's Guide to Difficult Conversations	ISBN 9781592576197
The Complete Idiot's Guide to Digital Photography	ISBN 9780789721099
The Complete Idiot's Guide to Disaster Preparedness	ISBN 9781592578931
The Complete Idiot's Guide to Drawing Basics	ISBN 9781592575473
The Complete Idiot's Guide to Drawing Manga	ISBN 9781592573356
The Complete Idiots Guide To Drawing People	ISBN 9781592572236
Complete Idiot's Guide to Drawing Superheroes and Villains	ISBN 9781592577958
The Complete Idiot's Guide to Dream Jobs	ISBN 9781592573820
The Complete Idiot's Guide to e-Commerce	ISBN 9780789721945
The Complete Idiot's Guide to Eastern Philosophy	ISBN 9780028638201
The Complete Idiot's Guide to Eating Raw	ISBN 9781592577712
The Complete Idiot's Guide to Eating Well with IBS	ISBN 9781615640294
The Complete Idiot's Guide to Economics	ISBN 9780028644929
The Complete Idiot's Guide to Elves and Fairies	ISBN 9781592573240
The Complete Idiot's Guide to Enhancing Self-Esteem	ISBN 9780028629308
The Complete Idiot's Guide to English Literature	ISBN 9781592576562
The Complete Idiot's Guide to Etiquette	ISBN 9780028610948
The Complete Idiot's Guide to European History	ISBN 9781592574896
The Complete Idiot's Guide to Extraterrestrial Intelligence	ISBN 9780028623870
The Complete Idiot's Guide to Extreme Weather	ISBN 9781592575534
The Complete Idiot's Guide to Fast and Fresh Meals	ISBN 9781592576326
The Complete Idiot's Guide to Fatherhood	ISBN 9780028631899
The Complete Idiot's Guide to Feeding your Baby and Toddler	ISBN 9781592574117
The Complete Idiot's Guide To Feng Shui	ISBN 9780028631059
The Complete Idiot's Guide to Finance and Accounting	ISBN 9780028617527
The Complete Idiot's Guide to Finding Mr. Right	ISBN 9781592578955
The Complete Idiot's Guide to Finding Your Dream Job Online	ISBN 9780789723260
The Complete Idiot's Guide to First Aid Basics	ISBN 9780028610993
The Complete Idiot's Guide to Fishing Basics	ISBN 9780028615981
Complete Idiot's Guide to Flower Gardening	ISBN 9780028631400
The Complete Idiot's Guide to Fondues and Hot Dips	ISBN 9781592575763
The Complete Idiot's Guide to Fortune Telling	ISBN 9781592575398
The Complete Idiot's Guide to Freemasonry	ISBN 9781592574902
The Complete Idiot's Guide To Friendship For Teens	ISBN 9780028641805
The Complete Idiot's Guide to Gambling Like a Pro	ISBN 9780028611020
The Complete Idiot's Guide to Game Theory	ISBN 9781615640553
The Complete Idiot's Guide to Genealogy	ISBN 9780028619477
The Complete Idiot's Guide to Geocaching	ISBN 9781592572359
The Complete Idiot's Guide to Geography	ISBN 9780028619552
The Complete Idiot's Guide to Geometry	ISBN 9781592571833
The Complete Idiot's Guide to Get Good Night Sleep	ISBN 9780028623948
The Complete Idiot's Guide to Getting Along with Difficult People	ISBN 9780028615974
The Complete Idiot's Guide to Getting Published	ISBN 9780028623924
The Complete Idiot's Guide to Getting Rich	ISBN 9780028613437
The Complete Idiot's Guide to Ghosts and Hauntings	ISBN 9780028636597
The Complete Idiot's Guide to Gluten-Free Eating	ISBN 9781592576838
The Complete Idiot's Guide to Glycemic Index Weight Loss	ISBN 9781592574049
The Complete Idiot's Guide to Golf	ISBN 9780028617602
The Complete Idiot's Guide to Good Food from the Good Book	ISBN 9781592577286
The Complete Idiot's Guide to Grammar and Style	ISBN 9780028619569
The Complete Idiot's Guide to Green Careers	ISBN 9781592578924
The Complete Idiot's Guide to Green Living	ISBN 9781592576623
The Complete Idiot's Guide to Grilling	ISBN 9780028628806
The Complete Idiot's Guide to Handwriting Analysis	ISBN 9780028632025
The Complete Idiot's Guide to Hawaii	ISBN 9781592575954
The Complete Idiot's Guide to Hinduism	ISBN 9780028642277
The Complete Idiot's Guide to Home Repair and Maintenance	ISBN 9781592571703
The Complete Idiot's Guide to Homemade Ice Cream	ISBN 9781592574841
The Complete Idiot's Guide to Homeschooling	ISBN 9780028639895
The Complete Idiot's Guide to Hypnosis	ISBN 9780028636603
The Complete Idiot's Guide to Improving Your Memory	ISBN 9780028629490
The Complete Idiot's Guide to Interfaith Relationships	ISBN 9780028639819
The Complete Idiot's Guide to Internet Privacy and Security	ISBN 9780028643212
The Complete Idiot's Guide to Intimacy	ISBN 9781592573875
The Complete Idiot's Guide to Investing for Women	ISBN 9780028629421
The Complete Idiot's Guide to Irish History and Culture	ISBN 9780028627106
The Complete Idiot's Guide to Italian History and Culture	ISBN 9780028642345
The Complete Idiot's Guide to Jazz	ISBN 9780028627311
The Complete Idiot's Guide to Jewish History and Culture	ISBN 9780028627113
The Complete Idiot's Guide to Jogging and Running	ISBN 9780028623863
The Complete Idiot's Guide to Jokes	ISBN 9781592575381
The Complete Idiot's Guide to Journalism	ISBN 9781592576708
The Complete Idiot's Guide to Juice Fasting	ISBN 9781615642250
The Complete Idiot's Guide to Juicing: Get Your Daily Fruits and Vegetables in One Delicious Drink	ISBN 9781592575688
The Complete Idiot's Guide to Kabbalah	ISBN 9781592575428
The Complete Idiot's Guide to Karate	ISBN 9780028623894
The Complete Idiot's Guide to Kickboxing	ISBN 9780028631752
The Complete Idiot's Guide to Knitting	ISBN 9781615640515
The Complete Idiot's Guide to Knitting and Crocheting	ISBN 9780028621234
The Complete Idiot's Guide to Knowledge Management	ISBN 9780028641775
The Complete Idiot's Guide to Las Vegas	ISBN 9781592578047
The Complete Idiot's Guide to Latino History and Culture	ISBN 9780028643601
The Complete Idiot's Guide to Leadership	ISBN 9780028639543
The Complete Idiot's Guide to Learning French	ISBN 9780028610436
The Complete Idiot's Guide to Learning German	ISBN 9780028639253
The Complete Idiot's Guide to Learning Italian on Your Own	ISBN 9780028621258
Complete Idiot's Guide to Learning Latin	ISBN 9780028639222
The Complete Idiot's Guide to Learning Spanish on Your Own	ISBN 9780028610405
The Complete Idiot's Guide to Learning Yiddish	ISBN 9780028633879
The Complete Idiot's Guide to Living with Breast Cancer	ISBN 9780028639383
The Complete Idiot's Guide to Lost Civilizations	ISBN 9780028629544
The Complete Idiot's Guide to Low Sodium Meals	ISBN 9781592574674
The Complete Idiot's Guide to Low-Sodium Cooking, 2nd Edition	ISBN 9781615641321
The Complete Idiot's Guide to Making Metal Jewelry	ISBN 9781615642724
The Complete Idiot's Guide to Making Money in Freelancing	ISBN 9780028621197
The Complete Idiot's Guide to Making Money on Wall Street	ISBN 9780028619583
The Complete Idiot's Guide to Making Money With Mutual Funds	ISBN 9781567616378
The Complete Idiot's Guide to Making Money with Rental Properties	ISBN 9781592572830
The Complete Idiot's Guide to Making Natural Beauty Products	ISBN 9781615640232
The Complete Idiot's Guide to Making Natural Soaps	ISBN 9781615640225
The Complete Idiot's Guide to Managed Health Care	ISBN 9780028621654
The Complete Idiot's Guide to Managing People	ISBN 9780028610368
The Complete Idiot's Guide to Managing Your Money	ISBN 9781567615302
The Complete Idiot's Guide to Managing Your Time	ISBN 9780028638010
The Complete Idiot's Guide to Manga Fantasy Creatures	ISBN 9781592576364
The Complete Idiot's Guide to Massage	ISBN 9780028627083
The Complete Idiot's Guide to MBA Basics	ISBN 9780028621647
The Complete Idiot's Guide to Meals In 30 Minutes or Less	ISBN 9781615641468
The Complete Idiot's Guide to Medical Tourism	ISBN 9781592578085
The Complete Idiot's Guide to Meditation	ISBN 9780028629070
The Complete Idiot's Guide to Microsoft Excel 2000	ISBN 9780789718686
The Complete Idiot's Guide to Microsoft Office	ISBN 9781567615449
The Complete Idiot's Guide to Microsoft Outlook 2000	ISBN 9780789719812
The Complete Idiot's Guide to Microsoft Windows 8	ISBN 9781615642366
The Complete Idiot's Guide to Microsoft Word 2000	ISBN 9780789718600
The Complete Idiot's Guide to Middle East Conflict	ISBN 9780028632612
The Complete Idiot's Guide to Money for Teens	ISBN 9780028640068
Complete Idiot's Guide to Motivating People	ISBN 9780028632001
The Complete Idiot's Guide to Motorcycles	ISBN 9780028624167
The Complete Idiot's Guide to Music Composition: Methods for Developing Simple Melodies and Longer Compositions	ISBN 9781592574032
The Complete Idiot's Guide to Music Theory	ISBN 9780028643779
The Complete Idiot's Guide to NASCAR	ISBN 9781592576975
The Complete Idiots Guide to NASA	ISBN 9780028642826
The Complete Idiot's Guide to Native American History	ISBN 9780028644691
The Complete Idiot's Guide to Natural Childbirth	ISBN 9781592579372
The Complete Idiot's Guide to Natural Disasters	ISBN 9780028632360
The Complete Idiot's Guide to Natural Magick	ISBN 9781592574186
The Complete Idiot's Guide to Nazi Germany	ISBN 9780028644752
Complete Idiot's Guide to Near-Death Experiences	ISBN 9780028632346
The Complete Idiot's Guide to Netscape Navigator With Windows 95	ISBN 9780789706805
The Complete Idiot's Guide to Numerology	ISBN 9780028632018
The Complete Idiot's Guide to Office Politics	ISBN 9780028623979
The Complete Idiot's Guide to Online Auctions	ISBN 9780789720573
The Complete Idiot's Guide to Online Shopping	ISBN 9780789717610
The Complete Idiot's Guide to Organizing Your Life	ISBN 9780028610900
The Complete Idiot's Guide to Paganism	ISBN 9780028642666
The Complete Idiot's Guide to Parenting a Preschooler and Toddler Too	ISBN 9780028617336
The Complete Idiot's Guide to Parenting a Teenager	ISBN 9780028612775
The Complete Idiot's Guide to PCs	ISBN 9781567611687
The Complete Idiot's Guide to Personal Finance in your 20s and 30s	ISBN 9780028624150
The Complete Idiot's Guide to Philosophy	ISBN 9780028619811
The Complete Idiot's Guide to Photography	ISBN 9780028610924
The Complete Idiot's Guide to Physics	ISBN 9781592570812
The Complete Idiot's Guide to Pilates on the Mat	ISBN 9781615641475
The Complete Idiot's Guide to Pirates	ISBN 9781592573769
The Complete Idiot's Guide to Plant-Based Nutrition	ISBN 9781615641017
The Complete Idiot's Guide to Playing Bass Guitar	ISBN 9781592573110
The Complete Idiot's Guide to Playing Guitar	ISBN 9780028642444
The Complete Idiot's Guide to Playing Piano	ISBN 9780028649252
The Complete Idiot's Guide to Playing Rock Guitar	ISBN 9781592579631
The Complete Idiot's Guide to Playing The Fiddle	ISBN 9781592577682
The Complete Idiot's Guide to Playing the Harmonica	ISBN 9780028642413
The Complete Idiot's Guide to Positive Dog Training	ISBN 9780028644639
The Complete Idiot's Guide to Pregnancy and Childbirth	ISBN 9780028631042
The Complete Idiot's Guide To Pro Wrestling	ISBN 9780028623955
The Complete Idiot's Guide to Programming Basics	ISBN 9780028642864
The Complete Idiot's Guide to Project Management	ISBN 9780028617459
The Complete Idiot's Guide to Protecting Yourself on the Internet	ISBN 9781567615937
The Complete Idiot's Guide to Psychology	ISBN 9780028636382
The Complete Idiot's Guide to Public Speaking	ISBN 9780028610382
The Complete Idiot's Guide to Publishing Children's Books	ISBN 9780028639758
The Complete Idiot's Guide to Publishing Science Fiction	ISBN 9780028639185
The Complete Idiot's Guide to Raising a Puppy	ISBN 9781582450407
The Complete Idiot's Guide to Raising a Strong-Willed Child	ISBN 9781592579235
The Complete Idiot's Guide to Raising Boys	ISBN 9781592577309
The Complete Idiot's Guide to Raising Chickens	ISBN 9781592579860
The Complete Idiot's Guide to Raising Girls	ISBN 9781592578818
The Complete Idiot's Guide to Raising Goats	ISBN 9781615640188
The Complete Idiot's Guide to Reaching Your Goals	ISBN 9780028621142
The Complete Idiot's Guide to Research Methods	ISBN 9781592571925
The Complete Idiot's Guide to Real Estate Investing	ISBN 9780028639765
The Complete Idiot's Guide to Remodeling Your Bath	ISBN 9781592572205
The Complete Idiot's Guide to Retiring Early	ISBN 9780028640129
The Complete Idiot's Guide to Robert's Rules	ISBN 9781592571635
The Complete Idiot's Guide to Running a Bed & Breakfast	ISBN 9780028640006
The Complete Idiot's Guide to Running Injury-Free	ISBN 9781592577330
The Complete Idiot's Guide to Running Your Small Office With Microsoft Office	ISBN 9780789717481
The Complete Idiot's Guide to RVing	ISBN 9780028641713
The Complete Idiot's Guide to Scrapbooking	ISBN 9780028643724
The Complete Idiot's Guide to Screenwriting	ISBN 9780028639444
The Complete Idiot's Guide to Self-Sufficient Living	ISBN 9781592579457
The Complete Idiot's Guide to Sewing	ISBN 9780028638911
The Complete Idiot's Guide to Shakespeare	ISBN 9780028629056
The Complete Idiot's Guide to Shamanism	ISBN 9780028643649
The Complete Idiot's Guide to Short Meditations: Meditations to Quiet Your Mind and Soothe Your Soul	ISBN 9781592576142
The Complete Idiot's Guide to Simple Home Repair	ISBN 9781592576654
The Complete Idiot's Guide to Simple Living	ISBN 9780028639079
The Complete Idiot's Guide to Single Parenting	ISBN 9780028624099
The Complete Idiot's Guide to Skiing	ISBN 9780028619651
The Complete Idiot's Guide to Sleep Training for Your Child	ISBN 9781592575404
The Complete Idiot's Guide to Smoothies	ISBN 9781592573189
The Complete Idiot's Guide to Snack Cakes	ISBN 9781592577378
The Complete Idiot's Guide to Soccer	ISBN 9780028627250
Complete Idiot's Guide to Speaking in Public with Confidence	ISBN 9780028610382
The Complete Idiot's Guide to Speed Reading	ISBN 9781592577781
The Complete Idiot's Guide to Spells and Spellcraft	ISBN 9781592572427
Complete Idiot's Guide To Spies and Espionage	ISBN 9780028644189
The Complete Idiot's Guide to Starting a Reading Group	ISBN 9780028636542
The Complete Idiot's Guide to Starting and Running a Bar	ISBN 9781592574063
The Complete Idiot's Guide to Starting and Running a Retail Store	ISBN 9781592577262
The Complete Idiot's Guide to Starting and Running a Winery	ISBN 9781592578184
The Complete Idiot's Guide to Starting Your Own Business	ISBN 9780028638881
The Complete Idiot's Guide to Statistics	ISBN 9781592571994
The Complete Idiot's Guide to Street Magic	ISBN 9781592576753
The Complete Idiot's Guide to String Theory	ISBN 9781592577026
The Complete Idiot's Guide to Sugar-Free Cooking and Baking	ISBN 9781615641840
The Complete Idiot's Guide to Surviving Anything	ISBN 9780028641744
The Complete Idiot's Guide to Surviving Bankruptcy	ISBN 9780028642130
The Complete Idiot's Guide to Surviving Divorce	ISBN 9780028611013
The Complete Idiot's Guide to Surviving Peer Pressure for Teens	ISBN 9780028642154
The Complete Idiot's Guide to Sushi and Sashimi	ISBN 9781592577828
The Complete Idiot's Guide to Tae Kwon Do	ISBN 9780028623894
The Complete Idiot's Guide to Taoism	ISBN 9780028642628
The Complete Idiot's Guide to Tapas	ISBN 9781592578245
The Complete Idiot's Guide to Tarot and Fortune-Telling	ISBN 9780028627373
The Complete Idiot's Guide to Tarot Spreads	ISBN 9781592575503
The Complete Idiot's Guide to Teaching College	ISBN 9781592576005
The Complete Idiot's Guide to Teaching Music On Your Own	ISBN 9781592579617
The Complete Idiot's Guide to Teaching the Bible	ISBN 9781592570645
The Complete Idiot's Guide to Team Building	ISBN 9780028636566
The Complete Idiot's Guide to the American Presidents	ISBN 9780028638218
The Complete Idiot's Guide to the Beatles	ISBN 9780028621302
The Complete Idiot's Guide to the Best Family Destinations	ISBN 9781615640478
The Complete Idiot's Guide to the Bible	ISBN 9780028627281
The Complete Idiot's Guide to the Civil War	ISBN 9780028621227
The Complete Idiot's Guide to the Cold War	ISBN 9780028638508
The Complete Idiot's Guide to the Crusades	ISBN 9780028642437
The Complete Idiot's Guide to the Gulf War	ISBN 9780028643243
The Complete Idiot's Guide to the History of Hockey	ISBN 9780130882592
The Complete Idiot's Guide to the I Ching	ISBN 9780028639796
Complete Idiot's Guide to the Pilates Method	ISBN 9780028639833
The Complete Idiot's Guide to the Internet	ISBN 9781567614145
The Complete Idiot's Guide to the Internet: UK Edition 1999	ISBN 9780139970993
The Complete Idiot's Guide to the Koran	ISBN 9781592571055
The Complete Idiot's Guide to the Mafia	ISBN 9780028642253
The Complete Idiot's Guide to the Middle Ages	ISBN 9781592578313
The Complete Idiot's Guide to the Oceans	ISBN 9780028644622
The Complete Idiot's Guide to the Paranormal	ISBN 9781592579884
The Complete Idiot's Guide to the Perfect Marriage	ISBN 9780028617299
The Complete Idiot's Guide to the Perfect Wedding	ISBN 9780028619637
The Complete Idiot's Guide to the Power of the Enneagram	ISBN 9781592576944
The Complete Idiot's Guide to the Psychology of Happiness	ISBN 9781592577118
The Complete Idiot's Guide to QuickBooks 2012	ISBN 9781615641178
The Complete Idiot's Guide to the Roman Empire	ISBN 9780028641515
The Complete Idiot's Guide to the Superfood Cookbook	ISBN 9781592577316
The Complete Idiot's Guide to the Talmud	ISBN 9781592572021
The Complete Idiot's Guide to the Lives of the Saints	ISBN 9780028642116
The Complete Idiot's Guide to the Ultimate Reading List	ISBN 9781592576456
The Complete Idiot's Guide to the Vietnam War	ISBN 9780028639499
The Complete Idiot's Guide to the World of Harry Potter	ISBN 9781592575992
The Complete Idiot's Guide to the World of Narnia	ISBN 9781592576173
The Complete Idiot's Guide to the World of the Bible	ISBN 9780028644479
The Complete Idiot's Guide to the World's Religions	ISBN 9780028617305
The Complete Idiot's Guide to Theories of the Universe	ISBN 9780028642420
The Complete Idiot's Guide to Throwing a Great Party	ISBN 9780028639741
The Complete Idiot's Guide to Toltec Wisdom	ISBN 9781592573929
The Complete Idiot's Guide to Total Nutrition	ISBN 9780028629568
The Complete Idiot's Guide to Triathlon Training	ISBN 9781592575800
The Complete Idiot's Guide to Trigonometry: Master Trig with Crystal-Clear Explanations of All the Basics	ISBN 9781615641444
The Complete Idiot's Guide to Trouble Free Car Care	ISBN 9780028610412
The Complete Idiot's Guide to Trouble-Free Home Repair	ISBN 9780028610429
The Complete Idiot's Guide to U.S. History, Graphic Illustrated	ISBN 9781592577859
The Complete Idiot's Guide to Understanding Catholicism	ISBN 9780028636399
The Complete Idiot's Guide to Understanding Einstein	ISBN 9780028631806
The Complete Idiot's Guide to Understanding Football Like a Pro	ISBN 9780028617435
The Complete Idiot's Guide to Understanding Islam	ISBN 9780028642338
The Complete Idiot's Guide to Understanding Judaism	ISBN 9780028631912
The Complete Idiot's Guide to Understanding Mormonism	ISBN 9780028644912
The Complete Idiot's Guide to Understanding the Amish	ISBN 9780028644707
The Complete Idiot's Guide to Understanding the Brain	ISBN 9780028643106
The Complete Idiot's Guide to Vampires	ISBN 9780028641812
The Complete Idiot's Guide to Vegan Cooking	ISBN 9781592577705
The Complete Idiot's Guide to Vegan Eating for Kids	ISBN 9781592579785
The Complete Idiot's Guide to Vitamins and Minerals	ISBN 9780028621166
The Complete Idiot's Guide to Voodoo	ISBN 9780028642369
The Complete Idiot's Guide to Walking for Health	ISBN 9780028640020
The Complete Idiot's Guide to Walt Disney World, 2013 Edition	ISBN 9781615642519
The Complete Idiot's Guide to Weather	ISBN 9780028627090
The Complete Idiot's Guide to Weight Loss	ISBN 9780028643854
The Complete Idiot's Guide to Werewolves	ISBN 9781592579853
The Complete Idiot's Guide to Wicca and Witchcraft	ISBN 9780028639451
The Complete Idiot's Guide to Wicca Craft	ISBN 9781592572625
The Complete Idiot's Guide to Windows XP	ISBN 9780028642321
The Complete Idiot's Guide to Wills and Estates	ISBN 9780028617473
The Complete Idiot's Guide to Wine	ISBN 9780028612737
The Complete Idiot's Guide to Word Search Puzzles	ISBN 9781592579006
The Complete Idiot's Guide to World Conflicts	ISBN 9780028643663
The Complete Idiot's Guide to World History	ISBN 9781592577125
The Complete Idiot's Guide to World Mythology	ISBN 9781592577644
The Complete Idiot's Guide to World War I	ISBN 9780028639024
The Complete Idiot's Guide to World War II	ISBN 9780028627359
The Complete Idiot's Guide to Writing a Novel	ISBN 9781592571727
The Complete Idiot's Guide to Writing Poetry	ISBN 9780028641416
Complete Idiot's Guide to XML	ISBN 9780789723116
The Complete Idiot's Guide to Yoga	ISBN 9780028619491
The Complete Idiot's Guide to Yoga with Kids	ISBN 9780028639352
The Complete Idiot's Guide to Zen Living	ISBN 9780028639581
The Complete Idiot's Guide to Zombies	ISBN 9781615640140
The Complete Idiot's Pocket Guide to MS-DOS 6.2	ISBN 9781567614176
The Complete Idiot's Pocket Idiot's Guide to Beanie Babies	ISBN 9780028630786
The Complete Idiot's Travel Guide to Boston	ISBN 9780028629124
The Complete Idiot's Travel Guide to Hawaii	ISBN 9780028624174
The Complete Idiot's Travel Guide to London	ISBN 9780028622972
The Complete Idiot's Travel Guide to New Orleans	ISBN 9780028623030
The Complete Idiot's Travel Guide to New York City	ISBN 9780028622972
The Complete Idiot's Travel Guide to Paris	ISBN 9780028628349
The Complete Idiot's Travel Guide to Planning Your Trip to Europe	ISBN 9780028623009
The Complete Idiot's Travel Guide to San Francisco & the Wine Country	ISBN 9780028623047
The Complete Idiot's Travel Guide to Walt Disney World & Orlando 2000	ISBN 9780028630939
The Complete Idiots Guide to Gardening	ISBN 9780028610962
The Complete Idiots guide to running a Successful home business for canadians	ISBN 9780132355810
The Pocket Idiot's Guide to 108 Yoga Poses: A Variety of Poses for Home, Office, or Travel	ISBN 9781592574933
The Pocket Idiot's Guide to Italian Phrases	ISBN 9780028631479

== See also ==
- Découvertes Gallimard – a similar series in French of introductory books, noted for its fine illustration. Some titles are translated in other languages.
- FabJob – a similar series of how-to-books for starting a business or dream career
- For Dummies – a similar series of how-to books from John Wiley & Sons, Inc..
- Haynes Manual – a series of reference guides, mainly based around automobiles, which include fictional vehicles but have gone on to many other topics including DIY, health and relationships and even manuals for man and woman.
- Teach Yourself – a similar series published by Hodder Headline
- Very Short Introductions – a similar series of introductory books published by the Oxford University Press.
