= Frank Sargeant (author) =

Frank Sargeant is author of 11 books on the outdoors, including The Complete Idiot's Guide to Boating and Sailing, published by Alpha Books and now in its third edition. He was outdoors editor of The Tampa Tribune in Tampa, FL for 24 years. He is now fishing editor of The Outdoor Wire, an on-line subscriber-based publication reaching 350,000 readers five times weekly. He has authored some 2,000 magazine articles and his works have won more than 60 national awards in the outdoors media. He is former president of the Florida Outdoors Writers Association. He holds an M.A. and a B.A. from Ohio University, and taught business English at the University of Florida as a graduate assistant. He currently resides in Guntersville, Alabama, and is fishing editor of The Outdoor Wire as well as senior writer for BoatTEST.com. His articles and photos also appear monthly in Game & Fish Publications and in Great Days Outdoor Magazine.
