= Alpha Books =

Imprint of Penguin Random House

- Parent company: Dorling Kindersley (Penguin Random House)
- Founded: 1991
- Country of origin: United States
- Headquarters location: Indianapolis, Indiana
- Official website: www.dk.com

Alpha Books, a member of Penguin Random House, is an American publisher best known for its Complete Idiot's Guides series. It began as a division of Macmillan. Pearson Education acquired Macmillan General Reference (MGR) from Simon & Schuster in 1998 and retained Complete Idiot's Guides while the rest of MGR was sold to IDG Books. Alpha moved from Pearson Education to Penguin Group in 2003. Alpha became part of sister company DK in 2012.

As of 2021, the Complete Idiot's Guides contains over 120 books.
