= Shannon Wright (illustrator) =

American cartoonist and illustrator

- Born: January 20, 1994 (age 32); Virginia
- Education: Virginia Commonwealth University in Richmond
- Awards: 2015 Certificate of Merit from the Virginia Press Association in illustration; 2016 Bobbi Braun Award from the Society of Illustrators
- Website: http://shannon-wright.com/

Shannon Wright is an American cartoonist and illustrator from Massaponax, Virginia. She is best known for political, feminist, and racial discussion in her artwork.

== Early life ==
Shannon Wright was born on 20 January 1994 in Virginia. She shared many interests with her brothers, Kevin II and Travis. She cites her brothers' interests in anime and cartoons as a reason for her extensive exposure to this genre as a child. An artist of color, Wright also states that she has always been in love with drawing.

She graduated from Virginia Commonwealth University (VCU) with a degree in Communication Arts in 2016. At this university, she took comic classes under Kelly Alder and was a Teaching Assistant for him.

== Career ==
Wright is known for her illustrative political statements and representations of the black community. She has made artwork for companies such as TIME, BBC, The Guardian, Bitch Media, Boom Studios, The New York Times, Eater, The Baffler, The Nib, and Mother Jones. She illustrated books for Macmillan, Simon & Schuster, and Penguin Random House. Wright has worked as the Editor-in-Chief for the VCU comics anthology, Emanata; and as Illustration Editor for The Commonwealth Times.

Wright's artistic representations include the depiction of traditional African-American hairstyles. Wright's illustrations originated from an assignment to illustrate the meaning of being a knight; she created a black female warrior with Bantu knots.

Her content involves responses from the black community to Donald Trump's rhetoric, and more. Her comic, 'Eight Ways to Resist Donald Trump,' catalogs a response to the Trump presidency, with an emphasis on unity, wellness, and resistance. While Wright does catalog much social commentary in these areas, she also supports causes such as environmentalism, as seen in "Hate Mowing Your Lawn? Good! Don't Do It".

In 2016, Wright contributed to Bitch Media's group show, No Feminism, No Future. Shannon has illustrated covers for Betty Before X by Ilyasah Shabazz and Renée Watson, and Strange Birds: A Field Guide to Ruffling Feathers by Celia C. Pérez.

== Illustrated works ==
- Betty Before X by Ilyasah Shabazz; book cover illustration by Wright
- Kaboom Adventure Time #57 comics cover for Boom Studios
- My Mommy Medicine. Written by Edwidge Danticat; picture book illustration. Roaring Brook Press, 2019.
- Twins by Varian Johnson, 2021

== Awards and reviews ==
- 2015: Certificate of Merit from the Virginia Press Association in illustration
- 2016: Bobbi Braun Award from the Society of Illustrators
- 2020: Twins has been on the Best Book review lists of several news organizations, including: National Public Radio, Kirkus Reviews, and The Washington Post.
