= Young Reader's Choice Award =

Award program of the Pacific Northwest Library Association

Award logo

The Young Reader's Choice Award is an award program of the Pacific Northwest Library Association (PNLA) which was inaugurated in 1940 by Harry Hartman, a well-known Seattle based bookseller. It is the oldest "children's choice" award in the U.S. and Canada and the only award chosen by children in two countries. Initially a single award, in 1991 the award expanded to include both a Youth and Senior category. In 2002, a third award category, Intermediate, was created. The PNLA now offers three annual awards for books selected by schoolchildren in the Pacific Northwest. The PNLA homepage heading is "Alaska, Alberta, British Columbia, Idaho, Montana, Washington", a list of the four U.S. states and two Canadian provinces where most of its members are located. It is the oldest regional association and the only binational one in the US and Canada.

The three winners of 2018 awards were published during 2015. The voting, open to "anyone in grades four through twelve in the Pacific Northwest who has read (or has heard read) at least one title from the list", is conducted by member libraries during March and April (school and public libraries, primarily the former).

The nomination process was last revised in 2012. Children, teachers, parents and librarians in Pacific Northwest may recommend books to their state, provincial representatives or to the YRCA Chair. Nominations of 2017 publications are due in February 2018. One nominee in each category must also include either a Canadian author or a title where the story primarily occurs in Canada.

== Recipients, 1940–1990 ==
YRCA winners from 1940 to 1990
Year	Author	Title
1940	Dell J. McCormick	Paul Bunyan Swings His Axe
1941	Richard and Florence Atwater	Mr. Popper's Penguins
1942	Laura Ingalls Wilder	By the Shores of Silver Lake
1943	Eric Knight	Lassie Come-Home
1944	Walter Farley	The Black Stallion
1945	Marie McSwigan	Snow Treasure
1946	Jack O'Brien	The Return of Silver Chief
1947	Robert McCloskey	Homer Price
1948	Walter Farley	The Black Stallion Returns
1949	Shannon Garst	Cowboy Boots
1950	Dr. Seuss	McElligot's Pool
1951	Marguerite Henry	King of the Wind
1952	Marguerite Henry	Sea Star, Orphan of Chincoteague
	No awards, 1953–1955	
1956	Ellen MacGregor	Miss Pickerell Goes to Mars
1957	Beverly Cleary	Henry and Ribsy
1958	William Corbin	Golden Mare
1959	Fred Gipson	Old Yeller
1960	Beverly Cleary	Henry and the Paper Route
1961	Jay Williams	Danny Dunn and the Homework Machine
1962	Stewart Holbrook	The Swamp Fox of the Revolution
1963	Jay Williams	Danny Dunn on the Ocean Floor
1964	Sheila Burnford	The Incredible Journey
1965	Richard Tregaskis	John F. Kennedy and PT-109
1966	Sterling North	Rascal
1967	Ian Fleming	Chitty Chitty Bang Bang
1968	Beverly Cleary	The Mouse and the Motorcycle
1969	Keith Robertson	Henry Reed's Baby-Sitting Service
1970	William Corbin	Smoke
1971	Beverly Cleary	Ramona the Pest
1972	Donald J. Sobol	Encyclopedia Brown Keeps the Peace
1973	No award	
1974	Robert C. O'Brien	Mrs. Frisby and the Rats of NIMH
1975	Judy Blume	Tales of a Fourth Grade Nothing
1976	John D. Fitzgerald	The Great Brain Reforms
1977	Judy Blume	Blubber
1978	John D. Fitzgerald	The Great Brain Does It Again
1979	Mildred Taylor	Roll of Thunder, Hear My Cry
1980	Beverly Cleary	Ramona and Her Father
1981	Ellen Conford	Hail, Hail Camp Timberwood
1982	Deborah Howe and James Howe	Bunnicula: A Rabbit Tale of Mystery
1983	Judy Blume	Superfudge
1984	Lynne Reid Banks	The Indian in the Cupboard
1985	Jamie Gilson	Thirteen Ways to Sink a Sub
1986	Betty Ren Wright	The Dollhouse Murders
1987	Robert Kimmel Smith	The War with Grandpa
1988	Barthe DeClements	Sixth Grade Can Really Kill You
1989	Mary Downing Hahn	Wait Till Helen Comes: A Ghost Story
1990	Louis Sachar	There's a Boy in the Girls' Bathroom

== Recipients, 1991–2001 ==
YRCA winners in two categories from 1991 to 2001
Year	Youth		Senior	
1991	Ann M. Martin	Ten Kids, No Pets	Jenny Davis	Sex Education
1992	Bill Wallace	Danger in Quicksand Swamp	Peter Dickinson	Eva
1993	Jerry Spinelli	Maniac Magee	Caroline B. Cooney	The Face on the Milk Carton
1994	Phyllis Reynolds Naylor	Shiloh	Ann Rinaldi	Wolf by the Ears
1995	Peg Kehret	Terror at the Zoo	Lois Duncan	Who Killed My Daughter?
1996	Lois Lowry	The Giver	Phyllis Reynolds Naylor	The Boys Start the War
1997	Caroline B. Cooney	Driver's Ed	Eve Bunting	Nasty Stinky Sneakers
1998	Louis Sachar	Wayside School Gets A Little Stranger	Karen Cushman	The Midwife's Apprentice
1999	Andrew Clements	Frindle	Eve Bunting	SOS Titanic
2000	Dick King-Smith	A Mouse Called Wolf	Mel Glenn	The Taking of Room 114
2001	Louis Sachar	Holes	William Sleator	The Boxes

== Recipients, 2002–present ==
YRCA winners in three grade-level categories (from 2002)
Year	Junior		Intermediate		Senior	
2002	Christopher Paul Curtis	Bud, Not Buddy	Carolyn Meyer	Mary, Bloody Mary	William Sleator	Rewind
2003	Kate DiCamillo	Because of Winn-Dixie	Gordon Korman	No More Dead Dogs	Joan Bauer	Hope Was Here
2004	Joseph Bruchac	Skeleton Man	Eoin Colfer	Artemis Fowl	Ann Brashares	The Sisterhood of the Traveling Pants
2005	Cornelia Funke	The Thief Lord	Gordon Korman	Son of the Mob	Nancy Farmer	The House of the Scorpion
2006	Kate DiCamillo	The Tale of Despereaux	Christopher Paolini	Eragon	KL Going	Fat Kid Rules the World
2007	Cornelia Funke	Dragon Rider	Eoin Colfer	The Supernaturalist	Terry Pratchett	A Hat Full of Sky
2008	Ann M. Martin	A Dog's Life: The Autobiography of a Stray	Rick Riordan	The Lightning Thief	Jodi Lynn Anderson	Peaches
2009	Kate DiCamillo	The Miraculous Journey of Edward Tulane	John Boyne	The Boy in the Striped Pajamas	Stephenie Meyer	New Moon
2010	Jeff Kinney	Diary of a Wimpy Kid (Diary #1)	Gordon Korman	Schooled	Cassandra Clare	City of Bones
2011	Kazu Kibuishi	Amulet: The Stonekeeper	Shannon Hale	Rapunzel's Revenge	Suzanne Collins	The Hunger Games
2012	Wendy Mass	11 Birthdays	James Dashner	The Maze Runner	Maggie Stiefvater	Shiver
2013	Rick Riordan	The Lost Hero (The Heroes of Olympus #1)	Raina Telgemeier	Smile	Han Nolan	Crazy
2014	Jeff Kinney	Diary of a Wimpy Kid: Cabin Fever (Diary #6)	Rick Riordan	The Son of Neptune (Heroes #2)	Veronica Roth	Divergent
2015	R. J. Palacio	Wonder	Raina Telgemeier	Drama	John Green	The Fault in Our Stars
2016.	Chris Grabenstein	Escape from Mr. Lemoncello's Library	Rick Yancey	The 5th Wave	Jennifer E. Smith	This is What Happy Looks Like
2017.	Cece Bell	El Deafo	Holly Black and Cassandra Clare	The Iron Trial	Veronica Roth	Four
2018.	Victoria Jamieson	Roller Girl	Rick Riordan	Magnus Chase and the Sword of Summer	Victoria Aveyard	Red Queen
2019	Dav Pilkey	Dog Man	Rick Riordan	The Hidden Oracle	Kendare Blake	Three Dark Crowns
2020	Alan Gratz	Refugee	Dusti Bowling	Insignificant Events in the Life of a Cactus	Angie Thomas	The Hate U Give
2021	Tui. T Sutherland	Wings of Fire: The Dragonet Prophecy	Victoria Schwab	City of Ghosts	Rachael Lippincott	Five Feet Apart
2022	Jerry Craft	New Kid	Padma Venkatraman	The Bridge Home	Tehlor Kay Mejia	We Set the Dark on Fire
2023	Victoria Jamieson and Omar Mohamed	When Stars are Scattered	Jordyn Taylor	The Paper Girl of Paris	Jennifer Lynn Barnes	The Inheritance Games
2024	Gordon Korman	Unplugged	Elizabeth Lim	Six Crimson Cranes	Lynn Painter	Better Than the Movies
2025	Johnnie Christmas	Swim Team	Katherine Applegate	Odder	Jasmine Warga	A Rover's Story

== Nominations 2019 - Present ==
YRCA Junior Division Nominations.
	Author	Title
2019	Dav Pilkey	Dog Man
2019	Kelly Barnhill	The Girl Who Drank the Moon
2019	Firoozeh Dumas	It Ain't so Awful Falafel
2019	Natalie Lloyd	The Key to Extraordinary
2019	John David Anderson	Ms. Bixby's Last Day
2019	Sara Pennypacker	Pax
2019	Peter Brown	The Wild Robot
2019	Marina Cohen	The Inn Between
2020	Katherine Applegate	Wishtree
2020	Linda Bailey	The Tiny Hero of Ferny Creek Library
2020	Pablo Cartaya	The Epic Fail of Arturo Zamora
2020	Cat Clarke	The Pants Project
2020	Cressida Cowell	The Wizards of Once
2020	Alan Gratz	Refugee
2020	Gordon Korman	Restart
2020	Jessica Townsend	The Trials of Morrigan Crow
2021	Katherine Arden	Small Spaces
2021	John David Anderson	Granted
2021	John August	Arlo Finch in the Valley of Fire
2021	Jonathan Auxier	Sweep: The Story of a Girl and Her Monster
2021	Sayantani DasGupta	The Serpent's Secret
2021	Tui T. Sutherland	Wings of Fire: The Dragonet Prophecy
2021	Terri Libenson	Positively Izzy
2021	Kenneth Oppel	Inkling
2022	Charlene Willing McManis	Indian No More
2022	Jerry Craft	New Kid
2022	Lynda Mullaly Hunt	Shouting at the Rain
2022	Kelley Armstrong	A Royal Guide to Monster Slaying
2022	Rosanne Parry	A Wolf Called Wander
2022	Jasmine Warga	Other Words for Home
2022	Yoon Ha Lee	Dragon Pearl
2022	Lynne Kelly	Song for a Whale
2023	David Robertson	The Barren Grounds
	Janae Marks	From the Desk of Zoe Washington
	James Ponti	City Spies
	Rena Barron	Maya and the Rising Dark
	Tae Keller	When You Trap a Tiger
	Daniel Nayeri	Everything Sad Is Untrue (A True Story)
	Rob Harrell	Wink
	Victoria Jamieson	When Stars Are Scattered

YRCA Intermediate Division Nominations.
Year	Author	Title
2019	Kwame Alexander	Booked
2019	Marissa Meyer	Heartless
2019	Rick Riordan	The Hidden Oracle
2019	Iian Lawrence	The Skeleton Tree
2019	Nicole Castroman	Blackhearts
2019	Lauren Oliver	Replica
2019	Alwyn Hamilton	Rebel of the Sands
2019	Wesley King	OCDaniel
2020	S. K. Ali	Saints and Misfits
2020	Dusti Bowling	Insignificant Events in the Life of a Cactus
2020	Chris Colfer	Stranger Than Fanfiction
2020	Rosalyn Eves	Blood Rose Rebellion
2020	Stephanie Garber	Caraval
2020	Ryan Graudin	Invictus
2020	Antonio Iturbe	The Librarian of Auschwitz
2020	Fonda Lee	Exo
2021	Elizabeth Acevedo	The Poet X
2021	Leslie Connor	The Truth as Told by Mason Buttle
2021	Lisa Greenwald	TBH, This Is So Awkward
2021	Adib Khorram	Darius the Great is Not Okay
2021	Susin Nielsen-Fernlund	No Fixed Address
2021	Victoria Schwab	City of Ghosts
2021	Laura Sebastian	Ash Princess
2021	Scott Westerfeld	Imposters
2022	Padma Venkatraman	The Bridge Home
2022	Margaret Rogerson	Sorcery of Thorns
2022	Kwame Mbalia	Tristan Strong Punches a Hole in the Sky
2022	Elizabeth Lim	Spin the Dawn
2022	Sarah Henstra	We Contain Multitudes
2022	Kip Wilson	White Rose
2022	Christine Day	I Can Make This Promise
2022	Sarah Kuhn	I Love You So Mochi
2023	Aiden Thomas	Cemetery Boys
2023	Elizabeth Acevedo	Clap When You Land
2023	Darcie Little Badger	Elatsoe
2023	Tracy Deonn	Legendborn
2023	Ibi Aanu Zoboi	Punching the Air
2023	Adiba Jaigirdar	The Henna Wars
2023	Jordyn Taylor	The Paper Girls of Paris
2023	Traci Chee	We Are Not Free

YRCA Senior Division Nominations.
Author	Title
2019
Mindy McGinnis	The Female of the Species
E.K. Johnston	Exit, Pursued by a Bear
Shaun David Hutchinson	We Are the Ants
Ruta Sepetys	Salt to the Sea
Kendare Blake	Three Dark Crowns
Ransom Riggs	Tales of the Peculiar
Ryan North	The Unbeatable Squirrel Girl Beats Up the Marvel Universe
Alexandra Bracken	Passenger
2020
Cherie Dimaline	The Marrow Thieves
John Green	Turtles All the Way Down
S. Jae-Jones	Wintersong
E. K. Johnston	That Inevitable Victorian Thing
Karen M. McManus	One of Us is Lying
Adam Silvera	They Both Die at the End
Angie Thomas	The Hate U Give
Ibi Aanu Zoboi	American Street
2021
Tomi Adeyemi	Children of Blood and Bone
Holly Black	The Cruel Prince
Steven Levenson	Dear Evan Hansen
Rachel Lippincott	Five Feet Apart
Tahereh Mafi	A Very Large Expanse of Sea
Kate Alice Marshall	I Am Still Alive
Neal Shusterman	Dry
Courtney Summers	Sadie
2022
Ruta Sepetys	The Fountains of Silence
Elizabeth Acevedo	With the Fire on High
David Yoon	Frankly in Love
Akwaeke Emezi	Pet
Mindee Arnett	Onyx & Ivory
Randy Ribay	Patron Saint of Nothing
Mariko Tamaki	Laura Dean Keeps Breaking Up with Me
Tehlor Kay Mejia	We Set the Dark on Fire
2023
Nic Stone	Dear Justyce
Julie Murphy	Faith: Taking Flight
Kacen Callender	Felix Ever After
Kelly Yang	Parachutes
June Hur	The Silence of Bones
Jennifer Lynn Barnes	The Inheritance Games
Owen Laukkanen	The Wild
Leah Johnson	You Should See Me in a Crown
