= Deaths in July 1978 =

The following is a list of notable deaths in July 1978. Entries for each day are listed alphabetically by surname. A typical entry lists information in the following sequence:

- Name, age, country of citizenship at birth, subsequent country of citizenship (if applicable), reason for notability, cause of death (if known), and reference.

== July 1978 ==
=== 3 ===
- James Daly, 59, American actor, he was better known for portraying the senior surgeon Dr. Paul Lochner in the medical drama Medical Center,he also portrayed the immortal Mr. Flint in the Star Trek: The Original Series episode Requiem for Methuselah (1969), death due to heart failure.
- Michela Schiff Giorgini, 54, Italian egyptologist and actress, she had a starring role in Roberto Rossellini's war film A Pilot Returns (1942),she is primarily remembered for her extensive work in Nubia (modern Sudan) at Soleb on the River Nile, where from 1957 she conducted excavations of the Temple of Amenhotep III;, during the 20 years which she spent in the area, she went on to investigate the temple of Queen Tiye at Sedeinga, and the tomb of Taharqa at Nuri, death caused by meningitis.

=== 4 ===
- Sam Pottle, 44, American composer, conductor, and musical director, he composed a 1972 melody for the old poem Jabberwocky (1871) by Lewis Carroll, he also co-wrote the 1976 theme song The Muppet Show Theme for the sketch comedy television series The Muppet Show, death caused by a heart attack, which took place while Pottle was on holiday in Great Barrington, Massachusetts.

=== 6 ===
- Babe Paley, 63, American magazine editor and socialite, she was one of the three prominent Cushing sisters,she served as a fashion editor at the fashion magazine Vogue from 1939until 1947, death caused by cancer.

=== 9 ===
- Prince Nicholas of Romania, 74, a member of the Romanian royal family and the second son of Ferdinand I of Romania, Nicholas was the senior regent in the regency council for his underage nephew Michael I of Romania from 1927 until 1930, his regency ended in 1930, when his older brother Carol II of Romania returned to the country at the invitation of politicians dissatisfied with the regency's perceived failure to handle the effects of the Great Depression, and was proclaimed as the new king by the Parliament of Romania, Nicholas died in exile in Madrid.

=== 10 ===
- Abdul Razzaq an-Naif, 43 or 44 (date of birth uncertain), Iraqi military officer and politician, he briefly served as the prime minister of Iraq in July 1968, when he became the youngest prime minister of Iraq, at the age of 34, he was assassinated in London, with the killers being under the orders of an-Naif's political enemy Saddam Hussein. An-Naif was critically injured from multiple gunshot wounds as he left the Intercontinental Hotel in the City of Westminster's Park Lane and died the following day.
- Joe Davis, 77, English professional snooker and billiards player, he was the winner of all 15 events of the World Snooker Championship from 1927 until 1946, when he retired following his 15th and last victory; he remains the only undefeated player in the history of the World Championship, death caused by a chest infection (Respiratory tract infection), while Davis was recuperating from a lengthy surgical procedure.

=== 12 ===
- Vlasta Lah, 65, Austro-Hungarian-born Argentine film director,she was the first female director of sound films in Argentine cinema, and is credited as the only female filmmaker active in Latin America during the 1960s,she has been posthumously regarded as a pioneer of feminist cinema.
- Al J. Neiburg, 75, American lyricist,he is known for writing lyrics for such songs as "I'm Confessin' (That I Love You)" (1930) (with Doc Daugherty and Ellis Reynolds), "It's the Talk of the Town" (1933) and "Under a Blanket of Blue" (1933) (with Jerry Livingston and Marty Symes).
- Jay Williams, 64, American author of science fiction, children's literature, fantasy, historical fiction, non-fiction, and radical theatre,he authored at least 79 books, including 11 picture books, 39 children's novels, 7 adult mysteries, 4 nonfiction books, 8 historical novels and a theatrical play, he is probably best known for his science fantasy series Danny Dunn, which he co-authored with Raymond Abrashkin, death caused by a heart attack, which took place while Williams was on a trip to London.

=== 13 ===
- Oliver Messel, 74, English artist and stage designer, he served as the art director on such films as Caesar and Cleopatra (1945) and On Such a Night (1955), and as the production designer on Suddenly, Last Summer (1959), for which he was nominated for an Academy Award.

=== 14 ===
- Gaston Ragueneau, 96, French athlete, he competed at both the 1900 Summer Olympics in Paris and the 1908 Summer Olympics in London.
- Jack Woolgar, 64, British character actor,his prominent roles included the coal miner father in Stand Up, Nigel Barton, an autobiographical play by Dennis Potter, and Sam Carne 'Carney' in the soap opera Crossroads.

=== 16 ===
- Howard Estabrook, 94, American actor, film director, screenwriter, and producer,he won the Academy Award for Best Adapted Screenplay for his screenplay for the pre-Code Western film Cimarron (1931).

=== 17 ===
- Thayer David, 51, American actor, he portrayed several different characters in the Gothic soap opera Dark Shadows, such as Professor T. Elliot Stokes and Sandor Rakosi,he also portrayed the Reverend Silas Pendrake in the revisionist Western Little Big Man (1970) and the fight promoter Miles Jergens in the sports drama Rocky (1976), death due to a heart attack.

=== 23 ===
- Jerzy Duszyński, 61, Polish actor (d. 1978)
- Fausto Tommei, 68, Italian actor, presenter and Franciscan tertiary,.

=== 24 ===
- Foy Willing, 64, American singer, songwriter, and bandleader, he primarily performed Western music and appeared in Western films, he formed the band Riders of the Purple Sage,death caused by a heart attack.

=== 26 ===
- Kenneth Benda, 76, English actor,he was primarily known for television roles,he was a son-in-law of the British diplomat Beilby Alston.
- Mary Blair, 66, American illustrator, animation concept artist, colorist, designer, and writer, she is credited with color styling on the animated feature films Cinderella (1950), Alice in Wonderland (1951) and Peter Pan (1953), and the artistic influence of her concept art is strongly felt in those films, as well as in several animated shorts, including Susie the Little Blue Coupe (1952) and The Little House (1952), which she designed during the early 1950s, she has been credited with introducing modernist art styles to Walt Disney and his animation studio by using primary colors to form intense contrast and colors that are unnatural to the image which they are depicting, death caused by cerebral hemorrhage.
- Jimmy Jemail, 84, Lebanese-born American writer-photographer for the tabloid newspaper The Daily News, World War I-era war veteran of the United States Navy, and American football player, he played for the New York Brickley Giants in 1921, he is credited as the first Lebanese player to play in the National Football League (NFL), he worked for The Daily News as a writer-photographer for 52 years and would regularly interview "presidents, premiers, royalty, the rich, the famous, the ordinary and the bums", according to President Richard Nixon, Jemail's column was one of the most widely read in New York City,death caused by cancer.

=== 27 ===
- Willem van Otterloo, 70, Dutch composer, conductor, and cellist, he was the chief conductor of the Melbourne Symphony Orchestra from 1967 until 1968, and the chief conductor of the Sydney Symphony Orchestra from 1971 until his death in office in 1978, he was fatally injured in a car accident.

=== 30 ===
- Umberto Nobile, 93, Italian aviator, aeronautical engineer, and Arctic explorer,he was the designer and pilot of the semi-rigid airship Norge which in May 1926 reached the North Pole, at which point the Norwegian, American, and Italian flags were dropped from the airship onto the ice.

== Sources ==
- Bondanella, Peter. The Films of Roberto Rossellini. Cambridge University Press, 1993.
- Everton, Clive (1985). Guinness Snooker: the Records. Enfield: Guinness Superlatives. ISBN 978-0-85112-448-3.
- Everton, Clive (2012a). Black Farce and Cue Ball Wizards. Edinburgh: Mainstream Publishing. ISBN 978-1-78057-568-1.
- Kumpch, Jens-Uwe (May 11, 1996). "Tote Helden sind wahre Helden". Berliner Zeitung (in German). Archived from the original on March 18, 2007 – via Textarchiv.
- Nauright, John; Zipp, Sarah (January 3, 2020). Routledge Handbook of Global Sport. Abingdon: Taylor & Francis. p. 277. ISBN 978-1-317-50047-6.
