= Danny Dunn and the Automatic House =

1965 novel by Raymond Abrashkin

- First edition
- Author: Raymond Abrashkin; Jay Williams
- Illustrator: Owen Kampen
- Language: English
- Series: Danny Dunn
- Genre: Science fiction
- Published: 1965
- Pages: 139
- OCLC: 5318795
- Preceded by: Danny Dunn, Time Traveler
- Followed by: Danny Dunn and the Voice from Space

Danny Dunn and the Automatic House is the ninth novel in the Danny Dunn series of juvenile science fiction/adventure books written by Raymond Abrashkin and Jay Williams. The book was first published in 1965.

== Plot introduction ==
Professor Bullfinch develops the "House of the Future" in which all controls are automatic, and plans to debut it at an upcoming Science Fair. This includes temperature controls and other standard functions, but also items such as washing machines, food preparation and normal housework. Danny, Irene and Joe, as well as Irene's toddler cousin, go to explore the house and become trapped inside, as the locks were automated to have security settings to seal the house until the Professor's introduction. Danny and his friends learn that in addition to the automated locks, everything is only a fake sample and the windows cannot be broken. They are trapped inside with no food or telephone, and the Fair does not open for three days!

== Editions ==
McGraw-Hill

- Paperback, 1965, illustrated by Owen Kampen
- Hardback, 1965, illustrated by Owen Kampen

MacDonald and Jane's

- Hardback, 1966, illustrated by Dick Hart

Archway Books

- Paperback, 1979, #13 in their series

Pocket Books

- Paperback, 1983 reissue, illustrated by Owen Kampen
