= Danny Dunn, Time Traveler =

1963 novel by Raymond Abrashkin

- First edition
- Author: Raymond Abrashkin; Jay Williams
- Illustrator: Owen Kampen
- Language: English
- Series: Danny Dunn
- Genre: Science fiction
- Published: 1963
- Pages: 138
- OCLC: 1394737
- Preceded by: Danny Dunn and the Heat Ray
- Followed by: Danny Dunn and the Automatic House

Danny Dunn, Time Traveler (UK title: Danny Dunn, Time Traveller) is the eighth novel in the Danny Dunn series of juvenile science fiction/adventure books written by Raymond Abrashkin and Jay Williams. The book was first published in 1963.

== Plot ==
Professor Bullfinch's experiment with a time travel invention is being secretly observed by Danny, Joe, and Irene. The youngsters are startled by the appearance of a second Joe. During the following confusion, the time travel device transports them all into the past. Aided by Benjamin Franklin, the Professor works to return them to their present. While in the past, the youngsters explore the society of American life under British rule, only to find one of their number in danger of being marooned in the past.

== Editions ==
McGraw-Hill

- (Paperback, 1963, illustrated by Owen Kampen)
- (Hardback, 1963, illustrated by Owen Kampen)

MacDonald and Jane's

- (Hardback, 1965, illustrated by Dick Hart)

Archway Books

- (Paperback, 1979, #8 in their series)

Pocket Books

- (Paperback, 1983 reissue, illustrated by Owen Kampen)
