= Danny Dunn and the Smallifying Machine =

1969 novel by Jay Williams

- First edition
- Author: Raymond Abrashkin; Jay Williams
- Illustrator: Paul Sagsoorian
- Language: English
- Series: Danny Dunn
- Genre: Science fiction
- Published: 1969
- Pages: 139
- OCLC: 28200
- Preceded by: Danny Dunn and the Voice from Space
- Followed by: Danny Dunn and the Swamp Monster

Danny Dunn and the Smallifying Machine is the eleventh novel in the Danny Dunn series of juvenile science fiction/adventure books written by Raymond Abrashkin and Jay Williams. The book was first published in 1969.

== Summary ==
Professor Bullfinch has created a machine for the government which will shrink objects and be used for spying. When Danny sneaks into the lab, he and his friends discover the machine and try to use it for a problem they have been dealing with at school.

== Editions ==
McGraw-Hill

- Paperback, 1969, illustrated by Paul Sagsoorian
- Hardback, 1969, illustrated by Paul Sagsoorian

MacDonald and Jane's

- Hardback, 1970, illustrated by Barbara Swiderska

Archway Books

- Paperback, 1971, #1 in their series

Pocket Books

- Paperback, 1983 reissue, illustrated by Paul Sagsoorian
