= Danny Dunn and the Swamp Monster =

1971 juvenile science fiction/adventure novel by Raymond Abrashkin

- First edition
- Author: Raymond Abrashkin; Jay Williams
- Illustrator: Paul Sagsoorian
- Language: English
- Series: Danny Dunn
- Genre: Science fiction
- Published: 1971
- Pages: 142
- ISBN: 0-07-070538-0
- OCLC: 216091
- Preceded by: Danny Dunn and the Smallifying Machine
- Followed by: Danny Dunn, Invisible Boy

Danny Dunn and the Swamp Monster is the twelfth novel in the Danny Dunn series of juvenile science fiction/adventure books written by Raymond Abrashkin and Jay Williams. The book was first published in 1971. An audiobook of the work was released by the Listening Library in 1985.

== Plot introduction ==
Professor Bullfinch and Doctor Grimes take Danny and his friends to the beginning of the Nile River in Africa to investigate local legends of a swamp monster. Despite unforeseen calamities, a new, rare species of electric catfish is discovered.

== Editions ==
McGraw-Hill

- Paperback, 1971, illustrated by Paul Sagsoorian
- Hardback, 1971, illustrated by Paul Sagsoorian

MacDonald and Jane's

- ISBN 0-356-03965-X (Hardback, 1972, illustrated by Anne Mieke

Archway Books

- Paperback, 1979, #6 in their series

Pocket Books

- Paperback, 1983 reissue, illustrated by Paul Sagsoorian
