= Danny Dunn and the Anti-Gravity Paint =

1956 novel by Raymond Abrashkin

- First edition
- Author: Raymond Abrashkin, Jay Williams
- Illustrator: Ezra Jack Keats
- Series: Danny Dunn
- Genre: Science fiction
- Publication date: 1956
- Pages: 154
- OCLC: 17528399
- Followed by: Danny Dunn on a Desert Island

Danny Dunn and the Anti-Gravity Paint is the first novel in the Danny Dunn series of juvenile science fiction/adventure books written by Raymond Abrashkin and Jay Williams. The book was first published in 1956 and originally illustrated by Ezra Jack Keats.

== Plot ==
Through a mishap in Professor Bulfinch's laboratory, Danny accidentally creates an anti-gravity paint. In time, the government constructs a spaceship that uses the paint as a propulsion system. The spaceship is launched prematurely after Danny and Joe follow Professor Bullfinch and Dr. Grimes on a tour of the ship. A mechanical failure dooms the four to a trip out of the Solar System unless they can repair the ship. Should they fail in this, they will drift too far from the Sun and freeze to death.

The book was published in 1956, one year before the start of the Space Age. It explores the aspects of actual space exploration vis-à-vis science fiction. Danny's teacher, in an effort to get him to stop daydreaming about space adventures, makes him write repeatedly "Space travel is at least one hundred years away". After his teacher congratulates Danny for his spaceflight, he gives her the punishment assignment on which he worked while on board, and she says she will keep it as a souvenir.

== Reception ==
Floyd C. Gale wrote in Galaxy Science Fiction that the book "demonstrates a wonderfully brash humor ... let your 8-to-12-year-old find out the rest of the story for himself".

== Editions ==
McGraw-Hill

- (Paperback, 1956, illustrated by Ezra Jack Keats)
- (Hardback, 1956, illustrated by Ezra Jack Keats)
- (Hardback, 1957, Weekly Reader Children's Book Club Edition, illustrated by Ezra Jack Keats)

Brockhampton Press

- (Hardback, 1959, illustrated by Ezra Jack Keats)

Archway Books

- (Paperback, 1979, #7 in their series)

Pocket Books

- (Paperback, 1983 reissue, illustrated by Ezra Jack Keats)
