= Danny Dunn on a Desert Island =

1957 novel by Raymond Abrashkin

- First hardback edition
- Author: Raymond Abrashkin; Jay Williams
- Illustrator: Ezra Jack Keats
- Language: English
- Series: Danny Dunn
- Genre: Science fiction
- Published: 1957
- Pages: 159
- OCLC: 6895481
- Preceded by: Danny Dunn and the Anti-Gravity Paint
- Followed by: Danny Dunn and the Homework Machine

Danny Dunn on a Desert Island is the second novel in the Danny Dunn series of juvenile science fiction/adventure books written by Raymond Abrashkin and Jay Williams. The book was first published in 1957 and originally illustrated by Ezra Jack Keats.

== Plot introduction ==
Danny, his friend Joe Pearson, Professor Bulfinch and Doctor Grimes are flying a small private jet over the Pacific Ocean. The plane is forced to crash land on an uncharted desert island. Armed only with the items in their pockets, the four must create a living environment and come up with a plan to be rescued.

== Editions ==
McGraw-Hill

- (Paperback, 1957, illustrated by Ezra Jack Keats)
- (Hardback, 1957, illustrated by Ezra Jack Keats)

MacDonald and Jane's

- ISBN 0-356-01384-7 (Hardback, 1968, illustrated by Anne Mieke)

Puffin Books

- ISBN 0-14-030877-6 (Paperback, 1976, illustrated by Anne Mieke)

Archway Books

- (Paperback, 1979, #15 in their series)

Pocket Books

- ISBN 0-671-45754-3 (Paperback, 1982 reissue, illustrated by Ezra Jack Keats)
