= Danny Dunn and the Weather Machine =

1959 novel by Raymond Abrashkin

- First edition
- Author: Raymond Abrashkin; Jay Williams
- Illustrator: Ezra Jack Keats
- Language: English
- Series: Danny Dunn
- Genre: Science fiction
- Published: 1959
- Pages: 144
- OCLC: 302712
- Preceded by: Danny Dunn and the Homework Machine
- Followed by: Danny Dunn on the Ocean Floor

Danny Dunn and the Weather Machine is the fourth novel in the Danny Dunn series of juvenile science fiction/adventure books written by Raymond Abrashkin and Jay Williams. The book was first published in 1959 and originally illustrated by Ezra Jack Keats.

== Plot introduction ==
Danny accidentally discovers that an ionic transmitter Professor Bulfinch has been working on can be used to create miniature rainclouds.

== Reception ==
Floyd C. Gale of Galaxy Science Fiction rated the book four stars out of five for children: "The authors reap plenty of humor ... meanwhile sowing a considerable amount of meteorological knowledge in the process".

== Editions ==
McGraw-Hill

- (Paperback, 1959, illustrated by Ezra Jack Keats)
- (Hardback, 1959, illustrated by Ezra Jack Keats)

MacDonald and Jane's

- ISBN 0-356-08183-4 (Hardback, 1975, illustrated by Anne Mieke)

Pocket Books/Archway Books

- ISBN 0-671-29966-2 (Paperback, 1979, #10 in their series, illustrated by Ezra Jack Keats)
- ISBN 0-671-43681-3 (Paperback, 1983 reissue, illustrated by Ezra Jack Keats)
