= Danny Dunn Scientific Detective =

1976 novel by Raymond Abrashkin and Jay Williams

- First edition
- Author: Raymond Abrashkin; Jay Williams
- Illustrator: Paul Sagsoorian
- Language: English
- Series: Danny Dunn
- Genre: Science fiction
- Published: 1976
- Pages: 172
- ISBN: 0-07-070548-8
- OCLC: 1363971
- Preceded by: Danny Dunn, Invisible Boy
- Followed by: Danny Dunn and the Universal Glue

Danny Dunn Scientific Detective is the fourteenth novel in the Danny Dunn series of juvenile science fiction/adventure books written by Raymond Abrashkin and Jay Williams. The book was first published in 1976.

== Plot introduction ==
Professor Bullfinch and Doctor Grimes are working on more scientific ways to fight crime. Danny is facing an issue at school and needs to borrow the equipment to solve the school mystery.

== Editions ==
McGraw-Hill

- (Paperback, 1976, illustrated by Paul Sagsoorian)
- (Hardback, 1976, illustrated by Paul Sagsoorian)

MacDonald and Jane's

- (Hardback, 1976, illustrated by Anne Mieke)

Archway Books

- (Paperback, 1977, #3 in their series)

Pocket Books

- (Paperback, 1983 reissue, illustrated by Paul Sagsoorian)
