= Danny Dunn, Invisible Boy =

1974 novel by Raymond Abrashkin

- First edition
- Author: Raymond Abrashkin; Jay Williams
- Illustrator: Paul Sagsoorian
- Language: English
- Series: Danny Dunn
- Genre: Science fiction
- Published: 1974
- Publisher: McGraw-Hill
- Pages: 154
- ISBN: 0-07-070546-1
- OCLC: 730771
- Preceded by: Danny Dunn and the Swamp Monster
- Followed by: Danny Dunn Scientific Detective

Danny Dunn, Invisible Boy is the thirteenth novel in the Danny Dunn series of juvenile science fiction/adventure books written by Raymond Abrashkin and Jay Williams. The book was first published in 1974.

== Plot summary ==
Danny exacerbates a small electrical fire, altering an experimental crystalline semiconductor material Professor Bullfinch was evaluating. Professor Bullfinch is able to use this altered material to create ISIT (the Invisibility Simulator with Intromittent Transmission), a dragonfly-like probe which could be piloted with a telepresence helmet and gauntlet gloves.

The trio each tries out the device. Irene uses ISIT to birdwatch. Joe uses the device to observe a beehive from the inside. Danny discovers a bully nicknamed "Snitcher" cheating by copying the word list to the school spelling bee and dishonestly winning himself a boombox. The ISIT is outfitted with a speaker which is subsequently used by Danny as a means to pretend to be the bully's conscience, in order get Snitcher to confess to his father.

However, ISIT also causes problems, as soon afterwards Professor Bullfinch is visited by General Gruntel. The general reveals (in very authoritarian language) he wishes to use ISIT as a tool to spy not only on enemy governments, but against Americans as well. General Gruntel attempts to seize the unit, but is rebuffed by Doctor Grimes. While going to get authorization to seize the ISIT, Gruntel leaves the professor's lab under guard.

Danny, Irene, and Joe decide to take matters into their own hands and stealthily break into the lab to recover the probe. The probe's absence is realized which leads to Colonel Twist, the commanding officer of the two guards, to delusively believe the device has been stolen by a foreign power. As he is being confronted by Twist, the Professor realizes the trio of friends are responsible. He informs Danny that without destroying his notes detailing the creation of ISIT, either the Soviet Union or the United States military could still recreate it. While the local National Guard arrives to secure the house against foreign spies, Danny and the Professor make their way to the probe's controls and use it to cause a fire that destroys both the notes and probe.

Dr. Grimes arrives with orders from the Governor for the military personnel to stand down and leave the Bullfinch residence. Bullfinch informs Grimes that the device and his notes have been destroyed, leaving him the only man to remember the blueprints by memory. Professor Bullfinch also tells Dr. Grimes and Danny that he will not recreate ISIT until the world is ready for it.

== Real-world influence ==
The Central Intelligence Agency's Directorate of Science & Technology developed a dragonfly-like flying machine with a listening device in the 1970s but said in 2003 that the device was "never deployed operationally". However, unconfirmed reports of field uses of this technology by agencies unknown have been made in recent years. According to journalist Clive Thompson, this Danny Dunn book predicted the rise of personal drones, "including the weird, fun, and creepy ways they’ll change society".

== Editions ==
McGraw-Hill

- ISBN 0-07-070546-1 (Paperback, 1974, illustrated by Paul Sagsoorian)
- ISBN 0-07-070547-X (Hardback, 1974, illustrated by Paul Sagsoorian)

MacDonald and Jane's

- ISBN 0-356-04908-6 (Hardback, 1974, illustrated by Anne Mieke)

Pocket Books/Archway Books

- ISBN 0-671-29733-3 (Paperback, 1975, #2 in their series, illustrated by Paul Sagsoorian)
- ISBN 0-671-45068-9 (Paperback, 1983 reissue, illustrated by Paul Sagsoorian)

== See also ==
- Insectothopter
- FlyTech Dragonfly
- Micromechanical Flying Insect
