= Danny Dunn and the Fossil Cave =

1961 novel by Raymond Abrashkin

- First edition
- Author: Raymond Abrashkin; Jay Williams
- Illustrator: Brinton Turkel
- Language: English
- Series: Danny Dunn
- Genre: Science fiction
- Published: 1961
- Pages: 146
- OCLC: 5318976
- Preceded by: Danny Dunn on the Ocean Floor
- Followed by: Danny Dunn and the Heat Ray

Danny Dunn and the Fossil Cave is the sixth novel in the Danny Dunn series of juvenile science fiction/adventure books written by Raymond Abrashkin and Jay Williams. The book was first published in 1961.

== Plot ==
Danny and his friend Joe Pearson discover the entrance to a cave in the woods near their home. Professor Bulfinch has just invented a portable x-ray machine, and he, along with his geologist friend Dr. Tresselt see an opportunity to use the device in the cave. The two adults, along with Danny, Joe, and Irene, enter the cave on an expedition. They make an astonishing discovery, but they encounter a significant problem which prevents them from leaving the cave.

== Editions ==
McGraw-Hill

- (Paperback, 1961, illustrated by Brinton Turkel)
- (Hardback, 1961, illustrated by Brinton Turkel)

MacDonald and Jane's

- (Hardback, 1971, illustrated by Anne Mieke)

Archway Books

- (Paperback, 1979, #11 in their series)

Pocket Books

- (Paperback, 1983 reissue, illustrated by Brinton Turkel)
