= Danny Dunn and the Homework Machine =

1958 novel by Raymond Abrashkin and Jay Williams

- First edition
- Author: Raymond Abrashkin; Jay Williams
- Illustrator: Ezra Jack Keats
- Language: English
- Series: Danny Dunn
- Genre: Science fiction
- Published: 1958
- Pages: 141
- OCLC: 302827
- Preceded by: Danny Dunn on a Desert Island
- Followed by: Danny Dunn and the Weather Machine

Danny Dunn and the Homework Machine is the third novel in the Danny Dunn series of juvenile science fiction/adventure books written by Raymond Abrashkin and Jay Williams. The book is "about a boy who uses a machine invented by a professor to do his homework for him and his two friends".

The book was first published in 1958 and originally illustrated by Ezra Jack Keats. This is the first novel in the series to feature Irene.

== Plot ==
Professor Bullfinch has created a new design of computer in which the government may be greatly interested. He has to go away and leaves Danny Dunn the responsibility of continuing the process of programming data files into it. After using the computer to answer a question for his new friend, neighbour Irene Miller, he gets the idea to have the computer prepare homework. With his friend Joe Pearson and with Irene, they program the contents of textbooks into the computer. They have some success with the machine before it is sabotaged. Danny figures out what is wrong with the machine and corrects the problem. Danny's teacher also learns about the machine, and gives a special challenge to the Homework Champions.

== Current science ==
The "homework machine" is in the style of the large mainframe computers of the 1950s, but uses magnetic tapes, and microphone input instead of paper punched cards. The concept of students using computers for research is common today; however, this computer was not merely a machine to which the drudgery of solving many three- or four-digit-long division problems could be offloaded; it was also somehow able to accept "programming" of students' text books that enabled it to write reports on topics that were covered by the text books.

== Miscellania ==
Amateur radio is used for the first (and possibly only) time in the series, with Danny and Irene attempting to get a homework question answered. The call signs used would have been accurate for midwestern operators in that era, but not for the mode used (shortwave). In any event, there was too much static and the children resorted to opening the windows and talking across the alley.

== Reception ==
Floyd C. Gale wrote in the August 1959 issue of Galaxy Science Fiction that the book was "another funful adventure".

== Editions ==
McGraw-Hill

- Paperback, 1958, illustrated by Ezra Jack Keats
- Hardback, 1958, illustrated by Ezra Jack Keats

Brockhampton Press

- Hardback, 1960, illustrated by Ezra Jack Keats

MacDonald and Jane's

- Hardback, 1977, illustrated by Anne Mieke

Archway Books

- Paperback, 1979, #5 in their series

Pocket Books

- Paperback, 1983 reissue, illustrated by Ezra Jack Keats

== Musical ==
Danny Dunn and the Homework Machine was turned into a musical children's album on both Golden Records (Golden LP 239) and Wonderland Records (WLP-338), with music composed by Julie Mandel.
