= Cleopatra Confesses =

2011 novel by Carolyn Meyer

- Author: Carolyn Meyer
- Language: English
- Set in: Ancient Egypt
- Publisher: Simon & Schuster, Paul Wiseman Books
- Publication date: 7 June 2011
- Pages: 291 (hardcover), 304 (paperback)
- ISBN: 978-1416987284

Cleopatra Confesses is a historical fiction novel written by Carolyn Meyer, part of her Young Royals series. Set in first century Egypt, the book is a biography of Cleopatra VII Philopator from age 10 to 22. Cleopatra faced rivalry between sisters, her father's exile, arrogant brothers, Julius Caesar, and a lot more. This book is recommended for ages 12 and up.

== Main characters ==
- Cleopatra VII Philopator (Cleopatra)
- Ptolemy XII Auletes, Cleopatra's father
- Charmion, a fictional dancer
- Julius Caesar
- Tryphaena and Berenike, Cleopatra's belligerent older sisters
- Ptolemy XIII Theos Philopator, Cleopatra's co-ruler and second youngest brother

== Reception ==
Critical reception has been mixed. Cleopatra Confesses has received editorial reviews from Publishers Weekly, School Library Journal, Booklist, Library Media Connection, Children's Literature, Kirkus Reviews, and VOYA Magazine. Publishers Weekly criticized that the "short chapters can occasionally make the narrative feel choppy", but praised that the prose was "lush" and "detail-rich". School Library Journal described the novel as "appealing, well-paced, informative" and with "a rich assortment of characters, places, and events". VOYA Magazine described the plot as "engaging", "plausible", and "well-crafted", and recommended the novel for "fans of historical fiction dealing with ancient Egypt and those who have a particular interest in one of the world’s most fascinating female leaders". VOYA also recommended this book as "an introduction to historical fiction for book clubs" and as "a read-aloud to introduce students in social studies classes to the time period". Booklist commented that "the through details...occasionally threaten to overwhelm the story". Library Media Connection submitted a recommended review. Children's Literature noted that "this book will definitely appeal to historical fiction fans", and "readers looking for a strong woman role model will be thoroughly entertained". Kirkus Reviews described the first-person account as "mildly compelling", and criticized that "The occasionally vivid voice of an intelligent young woman lapses into uncharacteristic moments of denseness (as she fails to heed advice she's just given herself) or starchy historical or cultural explanations for the readers' benefit, often inserted into conversation". Kirkus stated that "the narrative arc lags under the inconsistent voice", and "readers who hungry purely for lots of effective detail of an ancient culture, time and place may find this a digestible-enough vehicle for it, with oodles of backmatter for support".
