= Young Royals (disambiguation) =

Young Royals is a 2021 Swedish television series.

Young Royals may also refer to:

- Young Royals (book series), a series of children's novels by Carolyn Meyer

== See also ==
- Royal (disambiguation)
- Young (disambiguation)
