= Danny Dunn on the Ocean Floor =

1960 novel by Raymond Abrashkin

- First edition
- Author: Raymond Abrashkin; Jay Williams
- Illustrator: Brinton Turkel
- Language: English
- Series: Danny Dunn
- Genre: Science fiction
- Published: 1960
- Pages: 156
- OCLC: 2662586
- Preceded by: Danny Dunn and the Weather Machine
- Followed by: Danny Dunn and the Fossil Cave

Danny Dunn on the Ocean Floor is the fifth novel in the Danny Dunn series of juvenile science fiction/adventure books written by Raymond Abrashkin and Jay Williams. The book was first published in 1960.

== Plot ==
Another accident in Professor Bulfinch's laboratory, instigated by Danny, results in the creation of a transparent, resilient material. The material proves useful in creating a bathysphere, and Professor Bulfinch, along with his friend Dr. Grimes, Danny, Joe, and Irene, descend into the Pacific Ocean on an experimental voyage. Unfortunately, the bathysphere's pilot is rendered unconscious, and the bathysphere becomes trapped in a cave. On their journey, the submarine is examined by a giant squid and attacked by a large shark.

== Reception ==
Floyd C. Gale of Galaxy Science Fiction rated the book 4.5 stars out of five for those aged eight to twelve.

== Editions ==
McGraw-Hill

- (Paperback, 1960, illustrated by Brinton Turkel)
- (Hardback, 1960, illustrated by Brinton Turkel)

MacDonald and Jane's

- Hardback, 1967, illustrated by Dick Hart)

Pocket Books/Archway Books

- (Paperback, 1979, #9 in their series, illustrated by Brinton Turkel)
- (Paperback, 1983 reissue, illustrated by Brinton Turkel)
