= A Rover's Story =

2022 novel by Jasmine Warga

- Author: Jasmine Warga
- Illustrator: Matt Rockefeller
- Cover artist: Matt Rockefeller
- Language: English
- Genre: Science fiction
- Set on: Earth and Mars
- Published: 2022
- Publisher: Balzer + Bray
- Publication place: New York
- ISBN: 9780063113930

A Rover's Story is a science-fiction novel by Jasmine Warga. It was published by Balzer + Bray in 2022.

A Rover's Story was a #1 New York Times bestseller, and won the Senior Young Reader's Choice Award in 2025.

Resilience is a fictional NASA Mars rover that explores Mars with great bravery, and faces hard challenges against dust-storms and other natural disasters.

== List of characters ==
- Resilience (Res), the main character. Res is a fictional rover who goes to Mars and ends in a museum on Earth. He is determined to help Rania.
- Fly, a flying drone, named by Res, that was made in the lab along with Res. Fly likes music and to sing (his favourite song is "Twinkle, Twinkle, Little Star") and is always brave, kind, smart, fun, energetic, honest and positive, but is not as strong as Res. Fly is Res's best friend.
- Guardian, a sassy, sarcastic satellite that is orbiting Mars and says things like "I wasn't talking to you, Fly!" He gives Res and Fly information sent by the NASA lab to help them in case something terrible happens, like a dust devil. Unlike Res, Guardian doesn't feel any human emotions (he almost adopts feeling, but rejects it), so Res is not best friends with Guardian.
- Journey, a rover who is a friend of Res.
- Courage, a rover who has been offline on Mars for many years.
- Rania, a NASA scientist who works on rovers: a hard worker, and Sophie's mom.
- Sophie, Rania's daughter, a grade-six kid from Ohio who loves sending messages to Res.
- Sophie's dad.
- Sitti, Sophie's grandmother (whose name is actually the Arabic word for "grandmother").
- Xander, a NASA scientist who has black spots under his eyes.

== Summary ==
Resilience is a rover that is being built in a lab with the help of Rania, a NASA scientist. When Res is not yet built he meets the "hazmats" Xander and Rania and he starts to feel human emotions. Then they start to make another rover. Her name is Journey. She is a practice rover: she does not go to Mars. When Res meets Journey he notices that Journey can talk to him. Eventually, he is able to see her and is happy with what he sees.

Rania's daughter is a sixth-grade girl named Sophie. She writes lots of letters to Res, the rover, before he goes to Mars---sometimes every week or day. She becomes Res's friend.

Res and Fly's take-off is a major event in the story. Fly is close to Res all the time. Res and Fly are trying to find water on Mars.

At one point, Res gets trapped in the red, dusty sand on Mars.

While Res is on Mars and Sophie is just getting into college, Rania gets sick. Sophie writes to Res about her worries. The audience is led to believe that she might have died.

Courage is a rover who has been offline for many years.

Towards the end of the story, Res goes up the mesa of Olympus Mons, but when he is nearly at the top he falls all the way down and is unconscious (shuts down) for seventeen years.

But in the end Rania gets Res back to Earth, after Res finds something important: Martian rock. He comes back safely and is the first rover ever to come back. But Fly is left on Mars. He gets stuck in a dust devil. He is not retrieved because he is not as valuable. Res is sad because Fly could not come back to Earth, and Res misses Fly.

Res is put in a museum on Earth. He is visited by Sophie and Rania, who we learn is still alive. Res is pleased to finally learn what a grade-six kid from Ohio is.

== Reviews ==
According to Brenda Bowen, "this touching, fact-filled novel [...] centers the maturation of gutsy Mars rover Resilience, 'built to be an unbiased observer', alongside that of Sophie, child to one of Res's NASA scientist creators".

According to Kirkus Reviews, "A Mars rover discovers that it has a heart to go with its two brains". "Other machines (even chatty cellphones) reject the notion that there's any real value to emotions" but "after Fly is downed in a dust storm, Res trundles heroically to the rescue in defiance of orders". "The intelligences here may be (mostly) artificial, but the feelings are genuine and deep".

According to The Horn Book Guide, Warga is "offering readers an unusual but heartfelt example of the importance of staying true to yourself, quirks and all".

According to Kate Quealy-Gainer, "this is far from just a cerebral exploration of what humanity means [...] and there's plenty of adventure and tension".

According to HeeYoung Kim, "Jasmine Warga, the author of this book, brings a unique perspective to the narrative".

According to Emily Graham, "it's an endlessly inventive story, replete with gentle humor and playful pondering, offering a unique perspective on everything from music and electronics to loyalty and love".
