= Barthe DeClements =

American author (1920–2019)

Barthe Faith DeClements
- Born: October 8, 1920; Seattle, Washington, U.S.
- Died: November 8, 2019; Everett, Washington, U.S.
- Occupation: Author
- Notable work: Nothing's Fair in Fifth Grade; Sixth Grade Can Really Kill You

Barthe Faith DeClements (October 8, 1920 – November 8, 2019) was an American author of children's and young adult books.

== Background ==
DeClements was born in Seattle, Washington on October 8, 1920. She died in Everett, Washington on November 8, 2019, at the age of 99.

== Awards ==
Her first novel, 1981's Nothing's Fair in Fifth Grade, won young reader awards from California, Georgia, and Ohio.

Sixth Grade Can Really Kill You won the 1988 Young Readers Choice Award and the 1989 Buckeye Children's and Teen Book (Ohio).

== Bibliography ==
- Nothing's Fair in Fifth Grade (1981)
- How Do You Lose Those Ninth Grade Blues? (1984)
- Sixth Grade Can Really Kill You (1985)
- Seventeen and In-Between (1985)
- I Never Asked You to Understand Me (1986)
- No Place for Me (1987)
- The Fourth Grade Wizards (1988)
- Double Trouble (1988)
- Five-Finger Discount (1989)
- Wake Me at Midnight (1991)
- The Bite of the Gold Bug: A Story of the Alaskan Gold Rush (1992)
- The Pickle Song (1993)
- Tough Loser (1994)
- Liar, Liar (1998)
