= Doomed Queen Anne =

2002 book by Carolyn Meyer

- Author: Carolyn Meyer
- Language: English
- Series: Young Royals
- Genre: Young-adult, Historical novel
- Publisher: Gulliver Books
- Publication date: 1 October 2002
- Publication place: United States
- Media type: Print (hardcover)
- Pages: 240
- ISBN: 0-15-216523-1
- OCLC: 49305319
- LC Class: PZ7.M5685 Do 2002
- Preceded by: Beware, Princess Elizabeth
- Followed by: Patience, Princess Catherine

Doomed Queen Anne is a young-adult historical novel about Anne Boleyn by Carolyn Meyer. It is the third book in the Young Royals series. Other books are Mary, Bloody Mary, Beware, Princess Elizabeth and Patience, Princess Catherine. The book was originally published in the U.S. in 2002 by Harcourt/Gulliver Books (now Houghton Mifflin Harcourt).

== Plot summary ==
The book begins in 1520 in Calais, where Anne is at an event called the "Field of the Cloth of Gold", hosted by Henry VIII of England and Francis I of France. She has no great beauty (olive skin, dark hair and dark eyes in a time when pale-faced blonds were seen as the coveted image), no wealth and no title. She meets up with her older sister Mary, who is a lady-in-waiting in Queen Catherine of Aragon's court, and is rumoured to be the mistress of King Henry VIII of England. The King is tiring of Catherine because she has produced no sons - only a daughter, Mary.

Anne's somewhat difficult childhood before the event is outlined. Always ill-favored by her parents, constantly antagonized by her older sister Mary, and disgusted by her own "deformities" (a small sixth finger and mole on her neck) she develops an ambition to rise to the top.

Anne, jealous of her sister's rumoured affair when Mary flaunts the fact that she has the King's favor, vows to become the second wife of King Henry VIII. Anne, too, becomes a lady-in-waiting in the Queen's court. When the King tires of Mary, Anne uses her wits to gain the King's heart. While strategically courting the King, Anne manages to persuade Henry to seek an annulment for his marriage to Catherine. When the Pope refuses, he defies the Roman Catholic Church, declares his marriage null and void on his own authority, and marries Anne. Everybody at court hates her, claiming that she is a witch - as her sixth finger and the mole on her neck seem to indicate.

Triumphant, Anne gets her way and becomes the wife of Henry and Queen of England. They have a child together, but it is a daughter, Elizabeth, and thus a great disappointment to Henry. The inability to produce a male heir continues to trouble Henry, and places Anne in a dangerous position.

Meanwhile, Anne's sister Mary is now widowed after her husband dies of the sweating sickness and remarries a commoner in secret. On learning that she is pregnant, she reveals this to Anne, who banishes her from court. The two never reconcile.

When Anne fails to give Henry a son after three years of marriage, the Seymour family begins plotting. Jane Seymour catches the king's attention. Realizing that the king may toss Anne aside for her, Anne begins to panic. Like Anne earlier in the novel, Jane refuses to become the King's mistress and instead drops heavy hints of marriage. After Anne miscarries again, she is falsely accused by the King, and by his daughter Mary, and by Lady Rochford, the wife of Anne's brother George, of committing adultery with five other men, her own brother George among them. Anne is sent to the Tower of London as a prisoner, and executed there for her treason against the King.

== Historical inaccuracy ==
In this novel the birthdates of the Boleyn children are 1502 (Mary), 1507 (Anne), and 1509 (George). Historians now believe the years of birth to be 1499 for Mary, 1504 for George, and either 1501 or 1507 for Anne.

In the novel, Mary becomes the king's mistress around 1520, sometime prior to the "Field of the Cloth of Gold". She is also presented as being married after the affair begins. In reality, Mary was married in February 1520, and embarked on her affair around 1521/1522. There is no evidence of her ever being sexually active with Henry VIII before her marriage to William Carey.

The book presents Anne as having "deformities" (sixth finger, mole on her neck). These "defects" were not ever mentioned by anyone who knew her throughout her lifetime. The first report of Anne Boleyn having any kind of deformity was brought up by Nicholas Sanders, long after her death. Sanders never met or saw her, being a young child when she died. His claim that Anne had the extra finger and mole was certainly just a false claim designed to slander her after her death.

The novel displays Mary as being a great beauty, the family favorite. This is untrue. Mary was sent to France in 1514. During her stay, she became known for her promiscuity. She had a number of affairs with King Francis and his courtiers. The French king himself referred to her as "a great prostitute, infamous above all," "the English mare," and "my hackney." Mary was sent away from the French court in 1519 for her promiscuous behavior, in disgrace. (Said affairs go unmentioned in the novel.) Her family was horrified. Thomas Boleyn managed to marry her off to a minor courtier a year later. There is no evidence that Mary was extraordinarily beautiful since there are no contemporary descriptions or paintings of her. In fact, there are descriptions of Anne Boleyn as a great beauty with captivating eyes.

Anne's parents would not have considered sending her to a nunnery because of her "defects"; as mentioned before, she had none. When she was sent abroad, it was for special education. The position Anne's parents secured for her in the Netherlands and France were greatly sought after.

Mary did marry a commoner in 1534. Her family was furious, and the king had her banished from court. Mary's statement "I would rather beg my bread with him than be the finest queen ever christened", was not something she told her sister. It was written in a letter to Thomas Cromwell. When Mary was having financial trouble, Anne assisted her by sending a golden cup and some money. These actions are never mentioned in the book.

Some time in November 1532, Anne and Henry were married in Calais. Anne did not sleep with Henry before she was wed. They were later remarried on English soil on January 25 when she was found to be pregnant.

Historically, Anne was an affectionate mother to Elizabeth, while in the novel, she simply wants a son to please Henry and hardly ever sees her daughter.

The book depicts Henry's daughter Mary by Catherine of Aragon as having been summoned to Greenwich Palace to witness the birth of Elizabeth because tradition requires it. She is then subsequently forced to perform several tedious and indignant tasks for Anne, which is merely "a means of passing the time." However, none of this happened in reality because Mary Tudor was living at Richmond at the time.

Anne did not seduce the king into marrying her. When she attracted the king it was unintentional. She was not jealous of her sister's affair. In fact, she was rather horrified by Mary's actions.

At the end, while Anne is awaiting execution, she narrates that while Catherine of Aragon had many supporters during her ordeal, she had none. Actually, she did have friends at court, among them Thomas Wyatt, Margaret Wyatt, Francis Weston, and others. She was supported by other leading Reformers, including Martin Luther and Marguerite of France. While Anne was largely unpopular with the English common folk during most of her reign, the sympathy of the people shifted to her when the accusations were formed as they were so outrageous that even her enemy Eustace Chapuys was incredulous.

Anne's charity works also goes unmentioned. Anne donated what is equivalent to millions of dollars to the poor people, more than all of Henry VIII's other wives combined.

The novel depicts Anne's accused lovers as being hung, drawn and quartered. In reality, they were all spared the traitor's death, instead receiving the simple axe. On page 129, Anne says that she, herself, will rest her own head on the block the following morning. According to eyewitness accounts, she knelt upright in the French style of execution.
