= Climbing the Stairs =

2008 novel

Climbing the Stairs is a young-adult novel written by Padma Venkatraman. It was published on 1 May 2008 by Penguin USA. The novel depicts fifteen-year-old Vidya, who is coming of age in a tumultuous time as her native India struggles for independence and the world battles in World War II. When her father suffers brain damage during an Indian independence protest, Vidya is forced to relocate with her family from Bombay to her paternal grandfather’s traditional home in Madras. In this new home, Vidya fights the subservient role assigned to her as a woman and finds sanctuary in the men’s library where she studies and dreams of freedom and college.

== Reviews ==
The novel received starred reviews in Publishers Weekly which stated, "This novel vivifies a unique era and culture as it movingly expresses how love and hope can blossom even under the most dismal of circuces" and Booklist which wrote, "In her first novel, Venkatraman paints an intricate and convincing backdrop of a conservative Brahmin home in a time of change." The Journal of Adolescent and Adult Literature stated that by writing Climbing the Stairs, "Venkatraman fills an important place in YA historical fiction. The book is well researched, politically balanced, and based on real experiences."
