= Hani and Ishu's Guide to Fake Dating =

2021 young adult novel by Adiba Jaigirdar

- Author: Adiba Jaigirdar
- Language: English
- Genre: Young adult novel; Romance
- Publisher: Hodder & Stoughton, a Hachette imprint
- Publication date: 25 May 2021
- Publication place: Ireland
- Pages: 352
- ISBN: 978-1-64567-257-9

Hani and Ishu's Guide to Fake Dating is a young adult romance written by Adiba Jaigirdar and published on 25 May 2021 by Hodder & Stoughton, an imprint of Hachette. It tells the story of two queer girls, Hani, who is Bangladeshi Irish, and Ishu, of Indian descent, who pretend to be girlfriends for their own personal reasons.

== Reception ==
In a review published in the School Library Journal, Amy Diegelman praised the "rich and nuanced depictions of Desi culture" and noted both the romance and the diversity written in the book by Adiba Jaigirdar would be appreciated by readers. Diegelman also comments on how the author "tactfully weaves" the difficulties teenagers may go through, including "biphobia, racist microaggressions, and Islamophobia." For The Booklist, Molly Horan wrote Hani and Ishu's Guide to Fake Dating is a good romance that deals with aspects usually not explored by most stories in the genre.

Kirkus gave the novel a starred review, and commented on how Jaigirdar skillfully explores the different identities of the main characters, while also writing "a delightfully romantic storyline." GeekMom gave a positive review, and said one important aspect of the novel was its avoidance of stereotypes. While Hani comes from a religious family, she is openly bisexual, and Ishu, who is atheist, has not come out. The reviewer also praised the writing and commented on how the book presents a queer narrative "from two different and lesser-seen perspectives."

Hani and Ishu's Guide to Fake Dating was a finalist in the 34th Lambda Literary Awards.
