= Jasmine Warga =

American children's and young adult book author

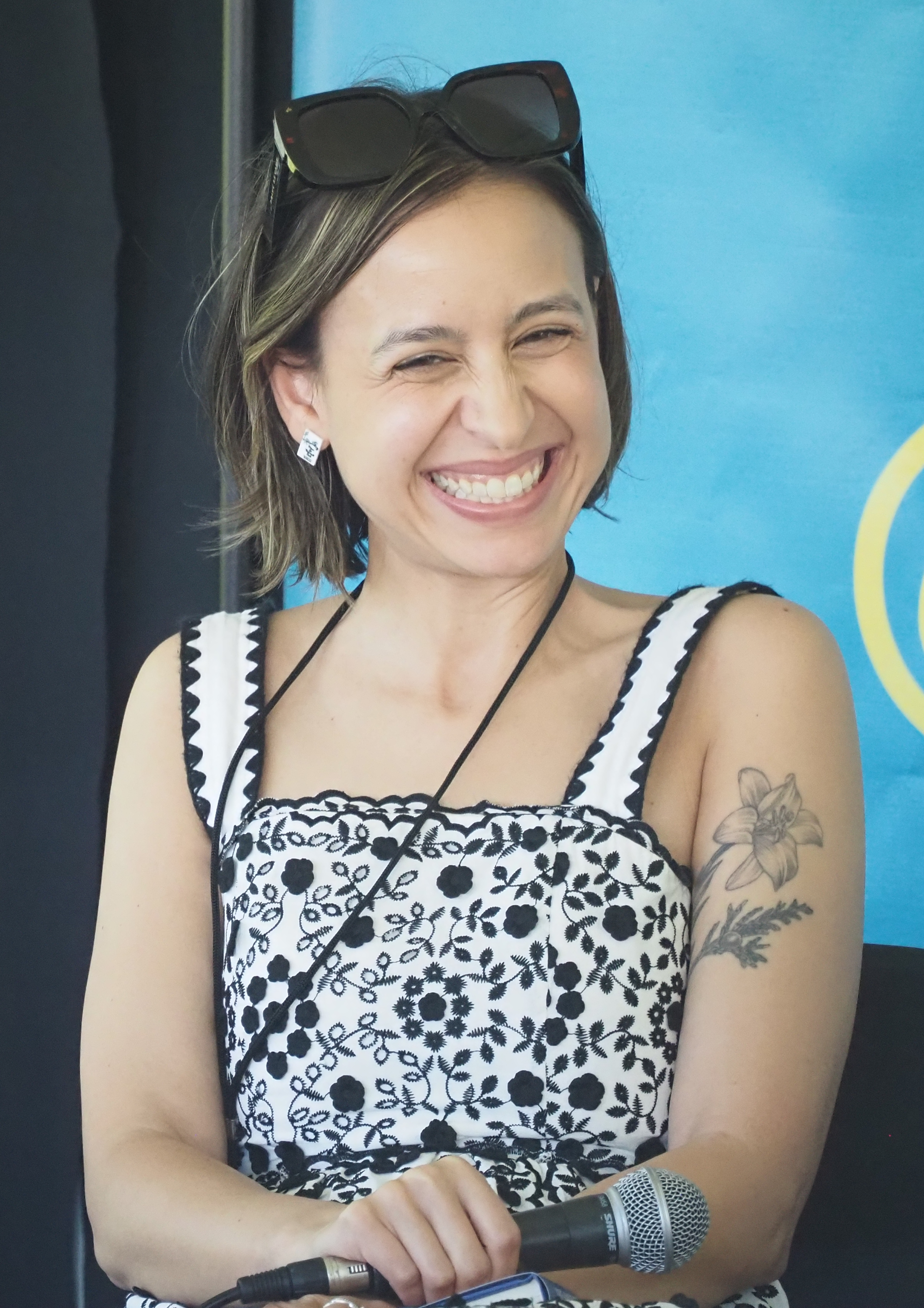
- Warga in 2026
- Born: April 24, 1988 (age 38); Cincinnati, Ohio, U.S.
- Occupation: Author
- Years active: 2015 — present

Jasmine Warga (born April 24, 1988) is an American children's and young adult book author. Her free verse book Other Words for Home received a Newbery Honor in 2020. Her novel A Rover's Story was a #1 New York Times bestseller, and won the Senior Young Reader's Choice Award in 2025.

== Early life and education ==
Warga was born in Cincinnati to an American mother and immigrant Jordanian father. She graduated from Northwestern University with a degree in history and art history. She also earned her MFA in creative writing at Lesley University. After graduating college, Warga worked as a sixth grade science teacher in Texas. While still teaching, she began writing stories.

== Career ==
Warga's debut novel, My Heart and Other Black Holes, published in 2015, is about depressed and suicidal teenagers. Warga was inspired to write the young adult novel after the unexpected death of a close friend. Her 2019 children's book about a Syrian refugee living in Ohio, Other Words for Home, won a Newbery Honor as well as other awards. She was inspired to write the book after visiting a Syrian family friend in 2013 and watching the interactions between his cousins born in America and cousins who had come to America from Syria. In her research over the course of writing the book, she interviewed members of Cincinnati's Syrian community.

== Personal life ==
Warga lives in Naperville, Illinois with her family. She teaches at the Vermont College of Fine Arts in addition to her writing career.

== Works ==
- My Heart and Other Black Holes (2015)
- Here We Are Now (2017)
- Other Words for Home (2019)
- The Shape of Thunder (2021)
- A Rover's Story (2022)
- A Strange Thing Happened in Cherry Hall (2024)
- The Unlikely Tale of Chase and Finnegan (2026)
