= My Heart and Other Black Holes =

2015 novel by Jasmine Warga

- Author: Jasmine Warga
- Language: English
- Genre: Young Adult Fiction
- Publisher: HarperCollins
- Publication date: February 17, 2015
- Media type: Print (hardback & paperback)
- Pages: 302
- ISBN: 9780062324689

My Heart and Other Black Holes is the debut young adult novel by American author Jasmine Warga. It was published by HarperCollins and released on February 17, 2015.

== Plot ==
Aysel Seran is a Turkish-American sixteen-year-old living in Kentucky. Several years earlier, her father was convicted for the murder of Timothy Jackson, a teenage aspiring Olympian, and she has not seen or contacted him since. At school she is an outcast since her father's crime is public knowledge and she has a strained relationship with her mother and stepfather, with whom she has lived since his imprisonment.

Aysel fantasizes about killing herself but doubts she has the resolve to follow through. One day at her job as a telemarketer, she is browsing a website that matches people for suicide pacts when she finds a posting from user FrozenRobot who lives in a nearby town. She messages him and they agree to meet up at the root beer stand between their two towns. Two days later, Aysel meets up with FrozenRobot (actually a seventeen-year-old boy named Roman) who insists that their joint suicide must take place on April 7. They share a meal together Aysel observes that by all appearances Roman is attractive and popular among his peers and she wonders what reason he has to commit suicide. She also finds out that he used to play basketball with Brian Jackson, Timothy's younger brother is following in his footsteps as a sports star. Aysel drives Roman back to his house where she learns that his parents are aware that he is suicidal, and as a result monitor him closely and have taken away his driving privileges at his therapist's recommendation.

At school, Aysel is paired with her reluctant classmate Tyler Bowen to work on a photography project. The following weekend Aysel meets Roman at a playground in his town where he divulges his reason for wanting to kill himself: while their parents were away from home, Roman's nine-year-old sister Madison drowned after having a seizure in the bathtub, which he did not hear because he was having sex with a girlfriend. Blaming himself for her death, Roman cut himself off from his friends and family. Aysel and Roman subsequently plan to jump off a cliff into the Ohio River together on April 7, which will mark the one-year anniversary of Maddie's death. In the meantime, Roman explains that he needs his mother to believe he is growing close to Aysel so she will allow him to go with her unsupervised on that date.

Aysel meets with Tyler to outline their photography project and decide to go to the zoo to take pictures of animals. Tyler sees a stick drawing of a hangman in Aysel's notebook, causing him to suspect that she is suicidal. Later at Roman's house, Aysel notes his talent for drawing (a hobby he took up after Maddie's death) and he spontaneously asks to come to the zoo with her and Tyler. The next day the three of them and Aysel's fourteen-year-old half-sister Georgia go to the zoo. After Roman notes the physical and personal differences between the sisters, Aysel confesses that her father is the reason she wants to kill herself but does not reveal more out of fear that he will hate her because of his own connection to Brian Jackson. Aysel also suddenly decides she wants to see her father one more time before she dies and Roman promises he will help her.

Later, Aysel searches her mother's study and finds an envelope addressed from the McGreavy Correctional Facility. After inviting Roman to her town's carnival, they plan a visit to her father and Roman admits that he enjoys spending time with her. On Saturday, Aysel drives to Roman's house to pick him up and his mother tells her that he has more often expressed happiness since meeting her. They drive to the prison and learn that Aysel's father has been transferred to a psychiatric hospital. Spending the night camping in the woods, Roman kisses her but asserts that any happiness they give each other is temporary and they can't let it stop them from jumping together on April 7. Aysel privately begins to reconsider whether the problems in her life are fixable and they fall asleep together.

The next morning Aysel views a portrait Roman drew of her notes that it seems stronger and more hopeful than she views herself as. They have breakfast at a diner and talk about what they would theoretically do with their lives after April 7. Aysel finally admits that her father killed Timothy Jackson (something Roman already suspected) and reveals the full story behind his crime: her father, a convenience store owner, became paranoid that his customers were stealing from him. One day Timothy and his friends came into the store and began juvenilely antagonizing Aysel's father, and he subsequently beat Timothy to death with a baseball bat. Hearing the story, Roman tells Aysel that she is not destined to become like her father and that it is okay for her to miss him.

On April 1, Aysel calls the psychiatric hospital her father is staying, but learns that since she is a minor she cannot schedule a visit with him without the consent of a guardian. She finally talks to her mother about her feelings of depression and agrees to be honest with her, also opening the door for contacting her father again. On April 3, Aysel begins planning for her future by applying for a summer scholarship program.

The next day, Aysel drives to Roman's house to try to convince him to live. His mother tells her she gave him permission to take the family car to see her and Aysel realizes Roman is attempting to commit suicide without her. She and his mother eventually find him in the car filling the detached garage with exhaust, but they able to save him before he suffocates.

The next day, Aysel visits Roman in the hospital. He tells her he knew she didn't truly want to die and felt that going through with their pact would have felt like killing her too, but he himself is in too much pain to go on. Aysel tells him she's in love with him and believes he deserves to live. On April 7, Aysel visits Roman again and is introduced to his new therapist. Roman asks her to visit Maddie's grave with him when he gets out. He questions why she has not given up on him and she says she want him to see himself the way she sees him. Roman kisses her again and tells her he will try to forgive himself and start looking for reasons to live.

== Inspiration ==
The author, Jasmine Warga, wrote the novel after the death of a close friend. She wanted to give voice to the feelings of depression and isolation. She stated in an interview with Interview magazine, "Aysel was a vessel for me to tackle questions about the demon of depression, grief, and the ultimate saving power of love and human connection."

== Film adaptation ==
On March 18, 2015, Paramount Pictures acquired the film adapting rights to the novel, with Anonymous Content set to produce.
