= T. V. Padma =

American writer

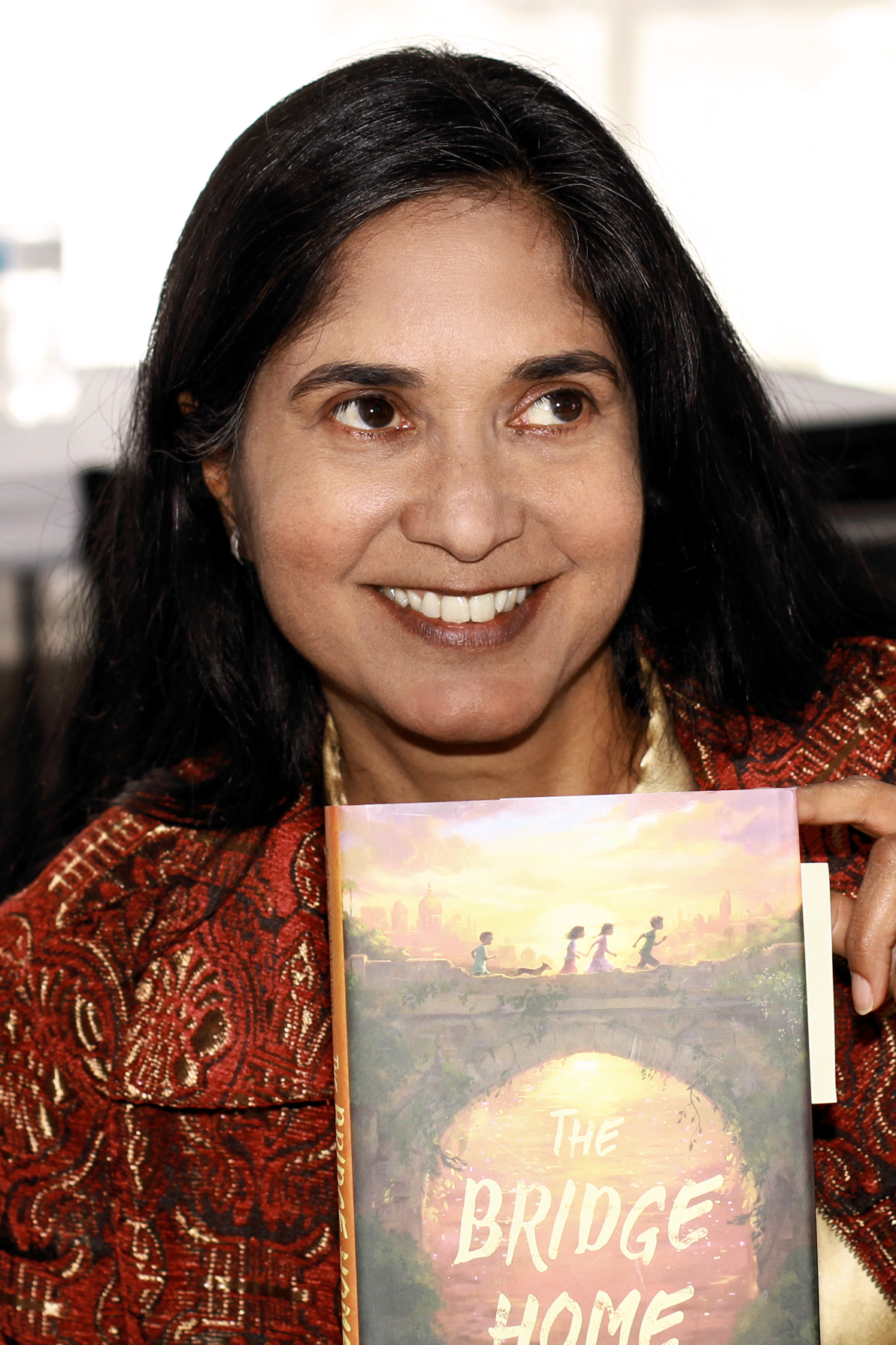
- Venkatraman at the 2019 Texas Book Festival
- Born: November 13, 1969 (age 56); Chennai, Tamil Nadu, India
- Website: padmavenkatraman.com

Padma Tiruponithura Venkatraman (born 13 November 1969), also known as T. V. Padma, is an Indian-American author and scientist.

== Early life ==
Venkatraman was born in Chennai on 13 November 1969, and studied at The School KFI. One of the poems she wrote as a child was published in the inaugural issue of the Delhi London Poetry Quarterly.

Venkatraman graduated from St. Michael's Academy in Chennai in 1986. She completed her undergraduate studies at St. Joseph's College, Bangalore in 1989, receiving bachelor's degrees in environmental science, chemistry, and botany.

== Scientific career ==
Before writing, Venkatraman worked as a scientist. She moved to the United States to pursue graduate studies. She obtained a caster's degree (1990-1994) and a doctorate (1996-2001) from the Virginia Institute of Marine Science (VIMS), part of the College of William and Mary. She conducted postdoctoral research in environmental engineering at Johns Hopkins University and later worked at GEOMAR Helmholtz Centre for Ocean Research Kiel, served as head of Inwoods Small School, and taught oceanography in addition to directing directed diversity efforts at the University of Rhode Island.

== Writing career ==
Venkatraman's debut novel, Climbing the Stairs, was released to starred reviews in Booklist, Publishers Weekly and Voice of Youth Advocates (VOYA). The Providence Journal's Sam Coale called it a "fine, often heartbreaking first novel". The novel also received positive reviews in Kirkus Reviews, School Library Journal, India New England News and India Currents. Climbing the Stairs won the 2009 Julia Ward Howe Award for Young Readers and the ASTAL (Alliance for the Study and Teaching of Adolescent Literature) RI Book of the Year Award and several other honors (ALA/YALSA BBYA; Amelia Bloomer List selection; Bank Street College of Education Best Book; Booklinks Best New Book; Booklist Editor's Choice Best Book; Booksense Notable; Capitol Choice; CCBC choice; CLN Top 25; National Council of Social Studies/Children's Book Center (NCSS/CBC) Notable; NYPL Best Book; PASLA Top 40; PW Flying Start) and was shortlisted for Reading Across Rhode Island, the Cybil awards, and state awards in Maine, Utah, South Carolina, and New Jersey.

Venkatraman's second novel, Island' End, was released to starred reviews in Kirkus, Booklist, School Library Journal and Publishers Weekly. It went on to win the international South Asia Book Award, and the Paterson Prize, as well as several honors (Kirkus BBYA; ALA/YALSA BBYA; Booklist Editor's Choice BBYA; CCBC choice, and ALA/Amelia Bloomer selection) and was a finalist for the BAC award and NE-SCBWI's Crystal Kite Award.

Venkatraman's novel in verse, A Time to Dance, was released in May 2014 by Nancy Paulsen Books to starred reviews in five journals (Kirkus, Booklist, Voices of Youth Advocates, Bulletin of the Center for Children's Books and School Library Journal); received positive reviews in newspapers (such as the Denver Post, Chicago Sun-Times, Newsday and Providence Journal); as well as other honors (e.g. American Library Association (ALA) Notable; ALA/Young Adult Library Association (YALSA) Best Book for Young Adults (BBYA), Booklist Top 10 art book for youth; Booklist Editor's Choice BBYA; Bookworm Central Top 40; Cooperative Children's Book Center (CCBC) choice; Center for the Study of Multicultural Literature (CSML) Best Book; Eliot Rosewater Award (IN) finalist; Forever Literary Top 10 Character Driven Books; International Board on Books for Young People (IBBY) Outstanding Book for Young People with Disabilities; International Reading Association (IRA) Notable Books for a Global Society; IndieBound selection; Kirkus BBYA; Mighty Girl Best Books of the year; New York Public Library (NYPL) Top 25).

In 2019, Venkatraman's The Bridge Home fourth novel for young people was released by Nancy Paulsen Books to starred reviews in School Library Journal, Booklist, Kirkus, Publishers Weekly and School Library Connection. She also narrated the audiobook herself, and later narrated the audiobook version of A Time To Dance. The Bridge Home Audiobook was a Junior Library Guild selection and won Audiophile Magazine's Earphone Award.

== Additional awards and honors ==
In 2009, Padma Venkatraman was a finalist for India New England's Woman of the Year Award. In 2008, she won the SCBWI Magazine Merit Award for Nonfiction. Prior to that, one of her earliest published works, The Cleverest Thief, published by August House, was awarded a Storytelling World Honor.

== Bibliography ==
- Venkataraman, Padma (1 May 2008). Climbing the Stairs. G. P. Putnam's Sons. ISBN 978-0-399-24746-0.
- Venkataraman, Padma (4 August 2011). Island's End. G. P. Putnam's Sons. ISBN 978-0-399-25099-6.
- Venkataraman, Padma (1 May 2014). A Time to Dance. Penguin Random House. ISBN 978-0-399-25710-0.
- Venkataraman, Padma (5 February 2019). The Bridge Home. Penguin Random House. ISBN 978-1-524-73811-2.
- Venkataraman, Padma (7 March 2023). Born Behind Bars. Penguin Random House. ISBN 978-0-593-11249-6.
- Venkataraman, Padma (21 January 2025). Safe Harbor. Penguin Random House. ISBN 978-0-593-11250-2.
- Venkataraman, Padma (25 August 2026). Faraway Family. Illustrated by Nicole Wong. Penguin Random House. ISBN 978-0-593-69886-0.
