= Rebel of the Sands =

2016 young adult novel by Alwyn Hamilton

Rebel of the Sand
- First edition
- Author: Alwyn Hamilton
- Language: English
- Series: Traitor to the Throne; Hero at the Fall
- Publisher: Faber & Faber; Viking Books (US)
- Publication date: February 4, 2016; March 8, 2016 (US)
- Media type: Print
- Pages: 314
- ISBN: 978-0-451-47753-8
- Followed by: Traitor to the Throne

Rebel of the Sands is a 2016 young adult novel written by Alwyn Hamilton. Rebel of the Sands is Hamilton's debut novel. This is the first book of the trilogy.

== Plot ==
Sixteen-year-old gunslinger and sharpshooter Amani Al'Hiza has the elemental power to control the sands of the desert. An orphan, she itches to leave Dustwalk her dead end home town, the small town where she lives with her aunt, uncle, and cousins. Amani escapes in a Buraqi, to travel across the desert with Jin, a mysterious foreigner. They encounter many dangers along the journey as they defend themselves against mythical creatures such as the "Nightmares" and "Skinwalkers". Along the way, Amani found many secrets about herself, her mysterious foreigner and the Rebel Prince.

== Reception ==
In a New York Times review, Jeff Giles wrote: "Rebel of the Sands is a winning bit of storytelling, as well as a homage to storytelling itself. It evokes such disparate influences ... that at times you wonder whether Hamilton can pull it all off. She can." Linda Buckley-Archer of The Guardian called the book "a high-concept, and highly enjoyable, epic fantasy adventure for young adults." A Publishers Weekly review remarked, "Hamilton successfully mingles romance with thrilling stakes, and hints at a welcome sequel." A Kirkus review described the book as "romantic, thrilling, hilarious, and just plain great fun."

== Film adaptation ==
Willow Smith's MSFTS Production and Cartel Entertainment acquired the film rights to the Rebel Of The Sands trilogy in 2017.

== Characters ==
Ajinahd Al-Oman Bin Izman (Jin); the mysterious foreigner

Amani; Sixteen-year-old sharpshooter, Demji marked by blue eyes, able to control desert sand, also goes by the moniker of Blue Eyed Bandit.

Ahmed Al-Oman Bin Izman; the Rebel Prince, the leader of the Rebellion

Shazad Al-Hamad; Daughter of a Mirajin general, among the original members of the Rebellion, well-trained fighter, strategist.

Delila; Demji marked by purple hair, able to cast illusions in the air, Ahmed's sister by blood. Jin's sister by adoption

Hala; Demji marked by golden skin, able to twist people's minds into hallucinations.

Imin; Demji marked by golden eyes, able to shape-shift into any human form, Hala's sibling

Izz and Maz; Twin Demji, marked by blue skin and blue hair respectively, able to shapeshift into any animals form.

Bahi; Childhood friend of Shazad, disgraced Holy Man.

Prince Naguib; One of the Sultan's sons, army commander

Tamid; Amani's best friend, Holy Father in training, walks with a limp due to a deformity at birth.

Farrah; Amani's aunt, eldest sister to Amani's mother.

Asid; Farrah's husband, a horse trader in Dustwalk.

Zahia; Amani's mother, hanged for the murder of her husband.

Hiza; Amani's mother's husband, not Amani's father by blood, killed by his wife.

Shira; Amani's cousin, Farrah's only daughter.

Fazim; Shira's lover
