= Carolyn Meyer =

American children's writer

- Born: June 8, 1935 (age 91); Lewistown, Pennsylvania, U.S.
- Occupation: Novelist
- Writing career
- Period: 1992–present
- Genres: Historical fiction, young adult fiction
- Website: readcarolyn.com

Carolyn Meyer (born June 8, 1935) is an American author of novels for children and young adults.

The typical genre for her work is historical fiction. She wrote the Young Royals series and contributed to Scholastic's The Royal Diaries series.

== Early life ==
Carolyn Meyer was born to parents Sara and Vic Meyer on June 8, 1935, in Lewistown, Pennsylvania. An only child, Meyer began her first novel, Humpy the Caterpillar and Gladys the Snail: A True Life Romance at the age of eight. After graduating as the head of her class in high school, Meyer attended Bucknell University. She graduated college in 1957 and moved to New York City.

She married E.A. "Tony" Mares (May 17, 1938–January 30, 2015), a poet and professor of English at University of New Mexico, Albuquerque with whom she had three sons. She began her career as an author after having children.

== Career ==
Meyer has written over 60 books. Her most recent published work is Girl with Brush and Canvas: Georgia O'Keeffe, American Artist, published in February 2019.

== Awards and recognition ==
Carolyn Meyer has received numerous accolades throughout her career, underscoring her significant contributions to young adult literature.

=== "Mary, Bloody Mary" ===
- Pacific Northwest Library Association Young Reader's Choice Award (2002)

 * Awarded in the Intermediate division for *Mary, Bloody Mary*.
 * Source: [Barnes & Noble](https://www.barnesandnoble.com/w/mary-bloody-mary-carolyn-meyer/1102475524)

- American Library Association Best Books for Young Adults (2000)

 * Recognized as one of the Best Books for Young Adults.
 * Source: [ALA](https://www.ala.org/yalsa/booklistsawards/booklists/bestbooksya/2000bestbooks)

- American Booksellers Association Pick of the Lists

 * Selected for the ABA Pick of the Lists.
 * Source: [Barnes & Noble](https://www.barnesandnoble.com/w/mary-bloody-mary-carolyn-meyer/1102475524)

- National Council for the Social Studies–Children's Book Council Notable Children's Trade Book in the Field of Social Studies

 * Honored as a Notable Children's Trade Book in the Field of Social Studies.
 * Source: [Barnes & Noble](https://www.barnesandnoble.com/w/mary-bloody-mary-carolyn-meyer/1102475524)

=== "Marie, Dancing" ===
- Book Sense Pick

 * Selected as a Book Sense Pick.
 * Source: [Barnes & Noble](https://www.barnesandnoble.com/w/marie-dancing-carolyn-meyer/1100156626)

=== Early Career Recognition ===
- American Library Association Notable Book Citations

 * 1971: *The Bread Book*
 * 1976: *Amish People*
 * 1979: *C.C. Poindexter*
 * Source: [Encyclopedia.com](https://www.encyclopedia.com/arts/educational-magazines/meyer-carolyn-1935)

- Children's Book Showcase Award (1977)

 * Awarded for *Amish People* by the Children's Book Council.
 * Source: [Encyclopedia.com](https://www.encyclopedia.com/arts/educational-magazines/meyer-carolyn-1935)

- Best Books Citation by The New York Times (1977)

 * Recognized for *Eskimos: Growing Up in a Changing Culture*.
 * Source: [Encyclopedia.com](https://www.encyclopedia.com/arts/educational-magazines/meyer-carolyn-1935)

- Pennsylvania School Librarians Association Author of the Year (1990)

 * Honored as Author of the Year.
 * Source: [PSLA](https://www.psla.org/assets/docs/awards/Previous%20Winners%20-%20Outstanding%20PA%20Authors%20%2B%20Illustrators%20%281%29.pdf)

== Novels ==
Novels by Carolyn Meyer
| Title | Year published | Part of Young Royals series |
|---|---|---|
| Where the Broken Heart Still Beats: The Story of Cynthia Ann Parker | 1992 | No |
| White Lilacs | 1993 | No |
| Rio Grande Stories | 1994 | No |
| Drummers of Jericho | 1995 | No |
| Gideon's People | 1996 | No |
| Jubilee Journey | 1997 | No |
| Mary, Bloody Mary | 1999 | Yes |
| Isabel: Jewel of Castilla | 2000 | Yes |
| Anastasia: The Last Grand Duchess | 2000 | Yes |
| Beware, Princess Elizabeth | 2001 | Yes |
| Kristina: The Girl King | 2003 | Yes |
| Brown Eyes Blue | 2003 | No |
| Doomed Queen Anne | 2004 | Yes |
| Patience, Princess Catherine | 2004 | Yes |
| Marie, Dancing | 2005 | No |
| Loving Will Shakespeare | 2006 | No |
| Duchessina: A Novel of Catherine de' Medici | 2007 | Yes |
| In Mozart's Shadow: His Sister's Story | 2008 | No |
| The True Adventures of Charley Darwin | 2009 | No |
| The Bad Queen: Rules and Instructions for Marie Antoinette | 2010 | Yes |
| Cleopatra Confesses | 2011 | Yes |
| The Wild Queen: The Days and Nights of Mary, Queen of Scots | 2012 | Yes |
| Victoria Rebels | 2013 | Yes |
| Beauty's Daughter: The Story of Hermione and Helen of Troy | 2013 | No |
| Anastasia and her Sisters | 2013 | Yes |
| Girl With a Camera: Margaret Bourke-White, Photographer | 2017 | No |
| Girl with Brush and Canvas: Georgia O'Keeffe, American Artist | 2019 | No |
