= The Henna Wars =

2020 novel by Adiba Jaigirdar

- Author: Adiba Jaigirdar
- Cover artist: Nabigal-Nayagam Haider Ali and Molly Gillespie
- Language: English
- Genre: Young adult fiction, romantic comedy
- Publisher: Page Street Kids (US); Hachette Children (UK)
- Publication date: May 12, 2020 (US); October 2021 (UK)
- Publication place: United States
- Media type: Hardcover, paperback, audiobook, ebook
- Pages: 400
- OCLC: 1153394356

The Henna Wars is a young adult novel by Adiba Jaigirdar. Set in Dublin, the book follows Nishat, a Bangladeshi teenager who comes out as a lesbian while in high school. The book received mostly positive reviews from critics, and was included on Time's list of the "100 Best Young Adult Books of All Time."

== Background ==
Before writing The Henna Wars, Jaigirdar worked on a manuscript for an adult literary novel about grief, but pivoted to the young adult genre after being inspired by writers such as Jenny Han and Sandhya Menon, who wrote young adult fiction about Asian characters. She wrote the manuscript for The Henna Wars in the span of three months, rewriting the ending a total of six times before publication.

The idea for the novel came from her own experiences as a Queer Bangladeshi Muslim living in Ireland. The main character's use of henna was inspired by her failed attempt to learn henna during a trip to Bangladesh. She turned that into a story about rival henna business, which later evolved into The Henna Wars. Because of the lack of YA fiction about Bangladeshi teens, she felt pressure to make sure that the book offered positive representation to South Asian LGBT youth.

She stated that she found it "difficult to reconcile queerness with Muslimness [sic]" when she was growing up, and that this influenced her portrayal of identity and sexuality in the book. While writing the novel, Jaigirdar tried to avoid Islamophobic stereotypes, particularly the portrayal of Muslims as homophobic and intolerant. She said that "I knew that this was the context I was writing in, so I wanted to be careful about how I portrayed sexuality, and its acceptance or rejection within Nishat’s family."

Jaigirdar drew inspiration from both Desi and Western media when writing The Henna Wars. She has cited works like the film Kuch Kuch Hota Hai and The Princess Diaries, as well as LGBT musicians like Hayley Kiyoko and Janelle Monáe. She also credited Ireland's literary culture with influencing her love of writing at a young age.

== Publication history ==
After completing the manuscript, Jaigirdar began searching for literary agents. She found an agent in the United States, where she felt that the publishing industry was more diverse than that of the UK or Ireland. It was published by Page Street Publishing Co. in the United States. Page Street published the book as a hardcover, audiobook, and ebook on May 12, 2020. Page Street sold the rights to Hachette Children's Group for publishing in the United Kingdom and Commonwealth of Nations. It was published through Hachette as an ebook in October 2020, and as a paperback in January 2021.

== Plot ==
Nishat, a Bangladeshi-Irish girl living in Dublin, struggles with bullying at the Catholic school she attends. She comes out as a lesbian to her Muslim parents, who respond disapprovingly. She develops a crush on her childhood friend Flávia, who has recently transferred to Nishat's school. Flávia's cousin, a white student named Chyna, bullies Nishat over her faith and ethnicity.

Nishat enters a school entrepreneurial competition and starts a Mehndi stall, offering henna tattoos. Flávia and Chyna also open a henna stall to enter the competition, which angers Nishat, who feels that they are engaging in cultural appropriation. Flávia, by contrast, feels that henna tattooing is a universal art style and sees nothing wrong with her having a stall. Nishat and Chyna attempt to sabotage each other while Flávia remains mostly unaware of the rivalry. Flávia eventually realizes why her use of henna bothers Nishat, and she stops. Nishat's parents become more accepting of their daughter, and she becomes romantically involved with Flávia.

== Major themes ==
The novel deals with a number of themes, including racism, homophobia, Islamophobia, and coming-of-age. The intersection between Nishat's cultural identity and her sexual identity is a central theme of the novel. Lana Barnes of Shelf Awareness described Nishat's struggle as "the dichotomy of wanting to break from the constraints of tradition while still maintaining strong ties to culture and beliefs."

== Reception ==
The Henna Wars has received generally positive reviews, including starred reviews from Kirkus Reviews and Shelf Awareness.

Kirkus Reviews praised the book's handling of its themes, saying it "weaves issues of racism and homophobia into a fast-moving plot peopled with richly drawn characters." Booklist said it was "a wholly uncontrived story with lesbians who aren't just brown but diverse in a multitude of ways." Shelf Awareness' Lana Barnes considered the handling of its themes to be "tactful, sincere and culturally immersive." Imogen Russell Williams of The Guardian called it "a brilliant debut; romantic, thought-provoking and entirely unique."

Writing for NPR, Caitlyn Paxon recommended the book specifically to "teens who are navigating their own tightrope of identities and assure them that it's okay to be messy." Molly Saunders from School Library Journal echoed the sentiment, writing that the book was"[d]eeply satisfying" and "[h]ighly recommended for fans of school stories that celebrate intersectional experiences."

Time included The Henna Wars on their list of the 100 Best Young Adult Books of All Time, alongside novels such as Little Women, Lord of the Flies, and The Catcher in the Rye. It was listed as one of the best young adult books of 2020 and 2021 by Teen Vogue, American Library Association, The Irish Times and NPR. The LGBT magazine Autostraddle included it on their list of the "67 Best Queer Books of 2020".

== Awards ==
Awards and honors for The Henna Wars
Year	Award/Honor	Result	Ref.
2020	Goodreads Choice Award for Young Adult Fiction	Nominee	
2021	YALSA's Best Fiction for Young Adults	Selection	
