= Alwyn Hamilton =

Canadian author

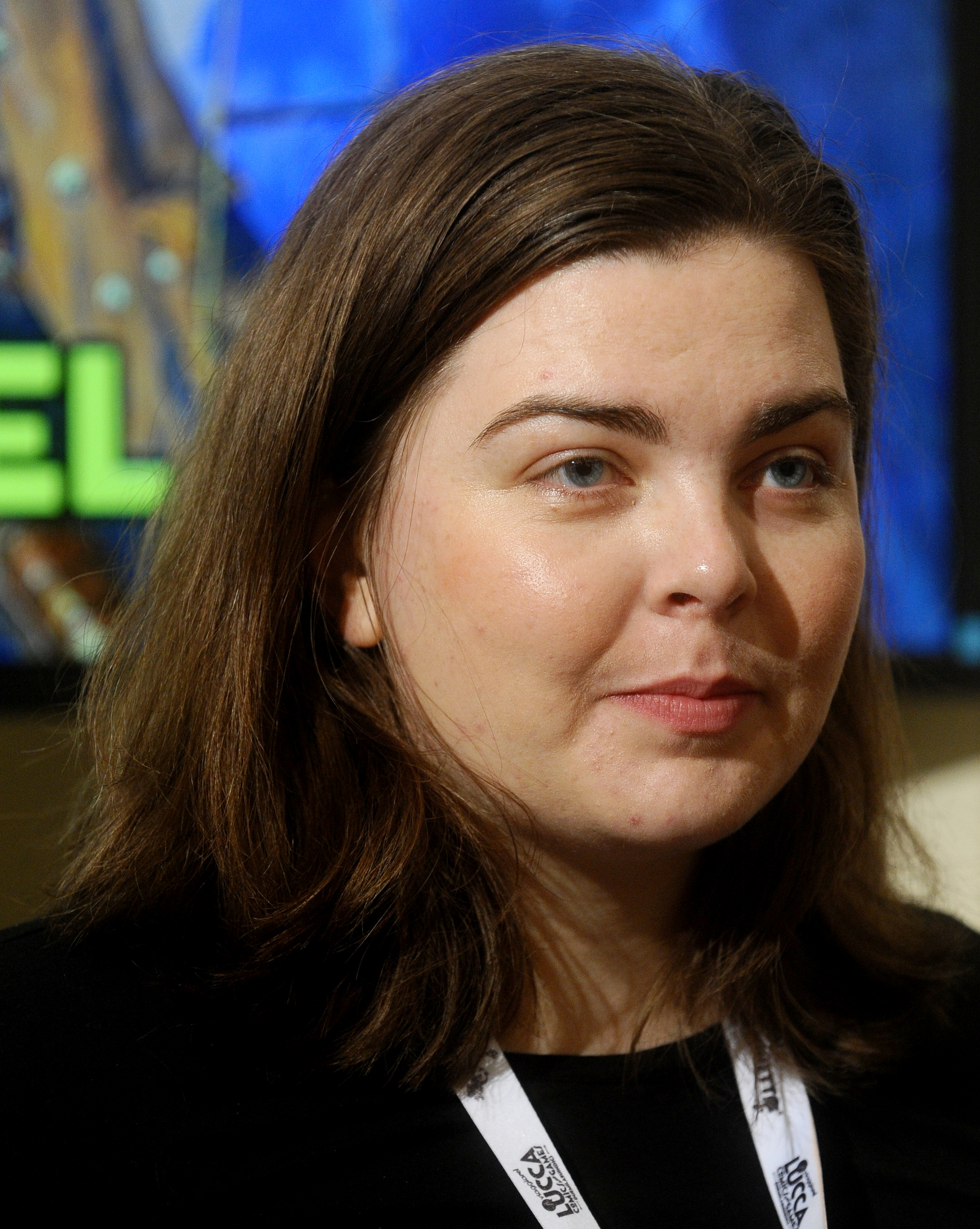
- Portrait of Alwyn Hamilton
- Born: Alwyn Hamilton; Toronto, Ontario, Canada
- Education: University of Cambridge
- Occupation: Novelist
- Writing career
- Language: English
- Years active: 2016–present
- Genres: Fantasy, young adult
- Notable work: Rebel of the Sands trilogy
- Website: www.alwynhamilton.com

Alwyn Hamilton is a Canadian author. She is known for her bestselling young adult book Rebel of the Sands.

== Biography ==
Hamilton was born in Toronto and had lived in Europe and Canada before her parents decided to settle in France. She grew up in Beaune a small town in France before moving to England to study History of Art at King's College, Cambridge. She later moved back to France for work after graduation. She currently lives in London.

== Work ==
Rebel of the Sands is Hamilton's debut novel and she wrote two more books to make it a trilogy. The book is written for young adults and is part of the fantasy genre. In Rebel, Amani leaves her hometown, Dustwalk, and travels through a magical countryside to reach the fictional nation of Miraji, in order to avoid an arranged marriage to her uncle. Publishers Weekly wrote that "Hamilton successfully mingles romance with thrilling stakes, and hints at a welcome sequel." Rebel made YALSA's nominations for the Teen's Top 10 list in 2017.

Traitor to the Throne, the sequel of Rebel of the Sands, continues to follow the story of Amani, who happens to be half-Djinn and have elemental powers. The Deseret News wrote that Rebel "was good, but this second book is far and away better."

The Globe and Mail described the series as Lonesome Dove meets Aladdin. Hamilton said that One Thousand and One Nights was a big influence on her work.

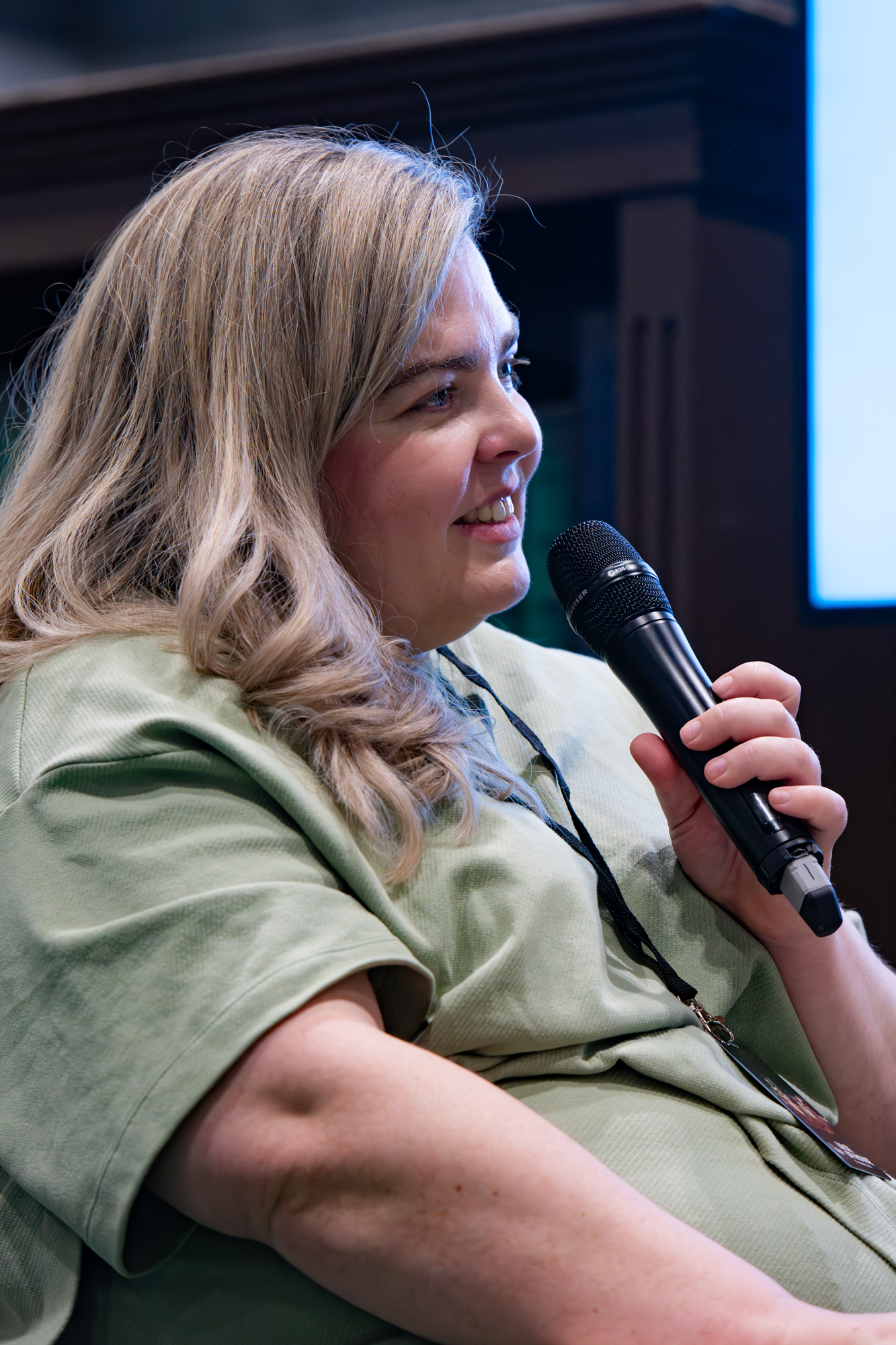
Moderating a Writer's Block panel, MCM Comic Con London, May 2025

Film rights of Rebel were bought by Willow Smith in 2017. Smith will lead the film's project and says of Rebel, "The nonphysical, creative and, wild nature of a female heroine's journey calls for a unique narrative structure that permeates the very foundation of the story."

== Bibliography ==
=== Rebel of the Sands Trilogy ===
1. Rebel of the Sands (2016)
2. Traitor to the Throne (2017)
3. Hero at the Fall (2017)

=== Other works ===
Tales from Sand & Sea (2018)

The Notorious Virtues (2025)

== See also ==
- List of Canadian writers
