= Adiba Jaigirdar =

Bangladeshi-Irish writer

- Born: Dhaka, Bangladesh
- Education: University College Dublin (BA); University of Kent (MA)
- Occupation: Writer
- Notable work: The Henna Wars
- Website: adibajaigirdar.com

Adiba Jaigirdar (Bengali: আদিবা জয়ীগিরদার) is a Bangladeshi-Irish writer. Her debut novel, The Henna Wars, was listed as one of Time magazine's 100 Best YA Books of All Time.

== Life ==
Jaigirdar was born in Dhaka, Bangladesh, then alternated between living in Saudi Arabia and Bangladesh as a child. At age ten, she and her family immigrated to Tullamore, Ireland; she has lived in the Dublin region ever since.

After immigrating to Ireland, Jaigirdar attended St Raphaelas Secondary School in Stillorgan, an all-girls Catholic school. She has a Bachelor of Arts in English and History from University College Dublin, as well as a Master of Arts in Postcolonial Studies from the University of Kent. She has described how she has often been in her life been in situations among only a few people of colour, an experience that has shaped her writing. Jaigirdar is queer and Muslim. Like characters from her novel Hani and Ishu's Guide to Fake Dating, she "has been told that parts of her identity cancel out others and couldn't exist in the same person." Her writing is inspired by her history and aims to help young Muslim people of colour embrace their queer identities.

== Career ==
=== The Henna Wars (2020) ===
The Henna Wars was published May 12, 2020 in the United States and October 2021 in the United Kingdom. The book follows Nishat, a Bangladeshi teenager who comes out as a lesbian while in high school.

The novel deals with a number of themes, including racism, homophobia, Islamophobia, and coming-of-age. The intersection between Nishat's cultural identity and her sexual identity is a central theme of the novel. Lana Barnes of Shelf Awareness described Nishat's struggle as "the dichotomy of wanting to break from the constraints of tradition while still maintaining strong ties to culture and beliefs."

The Henna Wars has received generally positive reviews, including starred reviews from Kirkus Reviews and Shelf Awareness. Time included The Henna Wars on their list of the 100 Best Young Adult Books of All Time. It was listed as one of the best young adult books of 2020 and 2021 by Teen Vogue, American Library Association, The Irish Times, Autostraddle, and NPR.

=== Other work ===
In addition to writing young adult novels, Jaigirdar has written for Book Riot. She also teaches English as a foreign language to recent immigrants to Ireland.

Her middle grade debut, Nadia Islam, On the Record, was published in January 2026.

== Publications ==
- The Henna Wars (2020)
- Hani and Ishu's Guide to Fake Dating (2021)
- A Million to One (2022)
- The Dos and Donuts of Love (2023)
- Four Eids and a Funeral (2024)
- Rani Choudhury Must Die (2024)
- Nadia Islam, On the Record (2026)
- The Perfect Match (2026)

=== Anthology contributions ===
- 200 CCS: Year One, edited by Paul A. Hamilton (2017)
- Momentum, edited by Gabriela Martins (2018)
- Keep Faith, edited by Gabriela Martins (2019)
- Allies: Real Talk About Showing Up, Screwing Up, And Trying Again, edited by Dana Alison Levy (2021)
- The White Guy Dies First: 13 Scary Stories of Fear and Power, edited by Terry J. Benton-Walker (2024)
