= Danny Dunn =

Juvenile SF/adventure book series

Danny Dunn is a fictional character, the protagonist of a series of American juvenile science fiction/adventure books written by Raymond Abrashkin and Jay Williams beginning in 1956.

== Background ==
The stories are set in the fictional American town of Midston. The plots feature characters who are interested in science and mathematics.

Abrashkin died in 1960, after publication of the fifth book. Williams, however, insisted on Abrashkin being given co-author credit on the subsequent ten books as well, since he had been instrumental in constructing the series. Ezra Jack Keats illustrated the first four novels in the series.

Although the exact location of Midston is not given, the authors wrote that a famed American of colonial times visited the town (when it was known as Middestown), implying Midston is somewhere in the original 13 states. In the book Danny Dunn and the Heat Ray, reference is made to U.S. Route 1 and U.S. Route 2 being located near Midston, and those roads meet only at Houlton, Maine.

== Characters ==
Dunn is a boy, a fifth-grader when the series starts, although the school year ends at the end of the first book. He is looking forward to a career in science. According to book reviewer Andrew Frederick, Dunn is precocious and headstrong — a redhead whose adventures mainly include getting into and out of trouble.

=== Other characters ===
- Professor Euclid Bullfinch, a researcher at [fictional] Midston University. The Professor is also a musician who plays the bass viol (also known colloquially as the "bull fiddle"). He is plump and somewhat bald, and smokes a pipe in some of the books. Danny considers him a mentor, and Danny's complicated problems often revolve around inventions by Bullfinch.
- Mrs. Dunn, Danny's widowed mother, housekeeper for Professor Bullfinch.
- Classmate Irene Miller, Danny's friend and next-door neighbor. Irene's father teaches astronomy at Midston University. Irene made her first appearance in the third book and is particularly interested in physics.
- Classmate Joe Pearson, Danny's friend. Joe is the poet of the group, and he often functions as an amusing sidekick to Danny, expressing bafflement at the complicated technology employed by Danny and the Professor.
- Classmate Eddie ("Snitcher") Phillips, rival of Danny and a school bully.
- Doctor A.J. Grimes, a friend of Professor Bullfinch introduced in the first book, Danny Dunn and the Anti-Gravity Paint. Grimes is a curmudgeonly figure, rarely taking the teenagers seriously, and often trying to antagonize the Professor. Doctor Grimes is also a musician who plays the piccolo; he and Professor Bullfinch occasionally play duets. Tall and lanky, he is in many ways a contrast to his friend Bullfinch.

== Books ==
1. Danny Dunn and the Anti-Gravity Paint (1956)
2. Danny Dunn on a Desert Island (1957)
3. Danny Dunn and the Homework Machine (1958)
4. Danny Dunn and the Weather Machine (1959)
5. Danny Dunn on the Ocean Floor (1960)
6. Danny Dunn and the Fossil Cave (1961)
7. Danny Dunn and the Heat Ray (1962)
8. Danny Dunn, Time Traveler (1963)
9. Danny Dunn and the Automatic House (1965)
10. Danny Dunn and the Voice from Space (1967)
11. Danny Dunn and the Smallifying Machine (1969)
12. Danny Dunn and the Swamp Monster (1971)
13. Danny Dunn, Invisible Boy (1974)
14. Danny Dunn Scientific Detective (1976)
15. Danny Dunn and the Universal Glue (1977)

== Albums ==
Danny Dunn and the Homework Machine was turned into a musical children's album on Golden Records (Golden LP 239), with music composed by Julie Mandel.

== Reception ==
Floyd C. Gale of Galaxy Science Fiction said in 1961 that "Danny's adventures are always based on a solid science foundation, once the authors' usually wild main premise is digested".

== See also ==
- Tom Swift
