= Other Words for Home =

2019 free verse children's novel

- Author: Jasmine Warga
- Language: English
- Publisher: HarperCollins
- Publication date: May 28, 2019
- Publication place: United States
- Pages: 352
- Awards: Newbery Honor
- ISBN: 978-0-06-274780-8

Other Words for Home is a 2019 free verse children's book by Jasmine Warga. The story is about a family of Syrian refugees with Jude, a 12-year-old girl, as protagonist. The book won a 2020 Newbery Honor.

== The Summary ==
The book is divided into six parts.

=== Part I : Changing ===
Jude is a 12-year-old girl who lives in a city in Syria on the Mediterranean Sea. There are many tourists in her city, but her father never allows her to talk to them, men, or anybody she does not know. Unlike many places in Syria, Jude's city, which is not as large or bustling, is safe from the war. Jude lives in an apartment across a courtyard from her extended family, and her best friend is her cousin, Fatima, with whom she eats her afternoon snack. They like to watch old movies from the United States together. As Jude enjoys her childhood, meeting a new friend with Fatima and exploring the city, she hears about the Syrian Civil War from her older brother, Issa (eye-sa). She feels like her brother is changing too much as he attends protests, and she hears about the horrors of the war from her father. Issa later moves out of the apartment. When his new apartment is raided by the police, the city becomes less safe, and police are everywhere. Jude's mother tells her that she is pregnant and it is time to leave Syria. They say goodbye to Jude's father, Issa, Fatima, and Auntie Amal. Jude promises Fatima that she will never forget her and Issa that she will be brave.

=== Part II : Arriving ===
Jude and her mother fly to Cincinnati, Ohio in a plane. They go through the immigration process at the airport. Jude feels lucky, but heartbroken to be leaving her father and brother. She meets her Uncle Mazin, Aunt Michelle, and cousin, Sarah. Aunt Michelle welcomes Jude as soon as she sees her. On the drive home to their house in Clifton, a neighborhood in Cincinnati, Sarah makes fun of how Jude speaks English. They arrive at the old three-story house where the family lives, in an area with many trees and hills. Uncle Mazin shows Jude all of his technology in his study. Jude watches a movie with Sarah, and she thinks that they are becoming friends until she hears a comment that Sarah makes to Aunt Michelle. She continues to be amazed by her new home, even though she feels grief from leaving her family, and Aunt Michelle is very nice to her. She takes Jude and Sarah out to eat at a French restaurant. Jude has some conflicts with her mother about adjustment to life in Cincinnati, America.

=== Part III : Staying ===
Aunt Michelle drops off Jude and Sarah at school. Jude is given a schedule but struggles to read it and is late to math, where she has difficulty with the problems because she has to explain them. Jude finds safety in her ESL class, where there are students like her who do not speak English as their first language, and the teacher is nice. Sarah is not friendly to Jude and does not invite her to sit with her friends at lunch. However, she gets to know the students in her ESL class: Ben from China, Grace from South Korea, and Omar from Somalia. Jude also gets to know Uncle Mazin when he takes her out to a steakhouse, and Sarah becomes friendlier when she invites Jude to her room. Her mother learns more English and they practice conversation together. Jude discovers Ludlow Avenue, a busy street in Cincinnati, and she finds a restaurant called Ali Baba which is Middle Eastern. She meets a girl named Layla who is in eighth grade, a year older, and whose parents are from Lebanon. They become friends, and as Jude gets more confident, she adjusts to her new home. Her mother makes fried cauliflower for dinner and brings cuisine from Syria to the table, where it is enjoyed. Layla later tells Jude that there is a school musical. She goes to a meeting and considers joining the stage crew, as Layla suggests, but also gets a packet with tryout instructions. Jude begins to learn more English, but as she improves, she gets the terrible news from her mother that Issa has moved to a more dangerous city. She is scared and wants information. As Thanksgiving approaches, Jude learns about giving thanks, and she has new hope.

=== Part IV : Hoping ===
Jude writes letters to Fatima and awaits a response from her. She goes to her mother's ultrasonogram appointment, sees the baby on the screen, and hears its heartbeat. They are overjoyed to discover that it is a girl. On their way out of the hospital, a woman tells Jude's mother that she doesn't have to wear her hijab anymore, but Jude knows that they are happy. Winter comes and Jude practices her monologue. She talks about the play when she goes sledding with Sarah and her friends. She tells Jude that she can't try out for the play because her English is not good enough, but Jude does not agree. She practices "I Will Always Love You" by Whitney Houston, which she used to sing with Issa. Jude chooses her monologue from Notting Hill, a Julia Roberts movie that she watched. Jude discovers that Fatima has not responded to her letters because her mother has hidden them, but she practices for the tryout with her mother and forgives her. She tries out with determination and ferocity. As she waits for the results, Jude gets her period, and she wears the hijab.

=== Part V: Growing ===
Jude's father cries when he sees her in the hijab on the video call, Layla's mother is very happy, the ESL teacher is too, and Aunt Michelle is a little suspicious about whether or not Jude was forced to wear it. Shortly after, Jude finds out that she got a part as Plumette in the play, and Sarah made the chorus. They are broken up into groups at the first practice. Jude is with Ethan, who is the star, Ruth, who works on sets, and Miles, a boy from her math class. She gets to know Miles and eats pizza with him at dinner. On Valentine's Day, Jude hears about the war in the Middle East from Layla, and she is afraid. Jude experiences discrimination, islamophobia, and bigotry for being Muslim. However, she becomes great friends with Miles and meets his dog. Ali Baba is vandalized, and Layla stops talking to Jude. She finds solace in ESL class. At play practice, Jude tells Miles about Issa, and he is understanding. Jude also becomes closer to Uncle Mazin. She gets a postcard from Fatima, who is in Beirut, and her mother organizes a fundraiser for Ali Baba. Jude makes up with Layla.

=== Part VI : Living ===
Jude hears from Ben that he has become a citizen of the United States, and she feels that everything is becoming easier. She is at play practice later when Uncle Mazin comes to get her and Sarah, telling them that the baby is coming. Jude finally meets her sister, who has been named Amal, for the first time. Everyone falls in love with her. Jude's mother finds a way to call Issa, and he tells them about what he is doing. There is conflict about where he will go. Jude attends the final play practice and goes out onto the stage on opening night. She has learned to be brave.
