= Young Royals (book series) =

Series of novels by Carolyn Meyer

Young Royals is a series of novels for children by Carolyn Meyer based on the early lives of multiple royalties such as English and French royalty. Books in the series are mostly about the English Tudors, such as: Mary, Bloody Mary (1999); Beware, Princess Elizabeth (2001); Doomed Queen Anne (2002); and Patience, Princess Catherine (2004). The French books in the series are Duchessina (2007), about the life of Catherine de' Medici, and The Bad Queen: Rules and Instructions for Marie-Antoinette (2010). The most recent titles in the series are: The Wild Queen: The Days and Nights of Mary, Queen of Scots (2012); Victoria Rebels (2013), about Queen Victoria of the British Empire; and Anastasia and Her Sisters (2013), about the daughters of Tsar Nicholas of Russia, specifically Anastasia.

The books commonly feature inside looks at what the lives of each girl would have been like, including daily routine, protocol, out-of-the-ordinary experiences, and first-hand views of the lives of the people surrounding each of them. In some books a character can be portrayed as a villain, whereas in a different book that same character is the heroine. The portrayal of each royal is biased according to the position of the observing royal, which provides a window into the life of royalty.

== Mary, Bloody Mary ==
Mary, Bloody Mary
- Author: Carolyn Meyer
- Language: English
- Series: Young Royals
- Genre: Young-adult, Historical novel
- Publisher: Gulliver Books
- Publication date: 30 August 1999
- Publication place: USA
- Media type: Print (hardcover)
- Pages: 232
- ISBN: 0-15-201906-5
- OCLC: 40912656
- LC Class: PZ7.M5685 Mar 1999
- Followed by: Beware, Princess Elizabeth

Mary, Bloody Mary is about the teen years of Queen Mary I of England. First published in hardcover in 1999, it is the first book in Meyer's Young Royals series.

=== Plot ===
The book begins in 1527, when Princess Mary, the daughter of Catherine of Aragon and King Henry VIII, learns she is to be betrothed to the king of France. Life goes well for the Princess until her father meets and falls in love with Anne Boleyn. This prompts him to demand an annulment of his marriage to Catherine, which would make the princess a bastard. Mary's father develops a strong attachment towards Anne Boleyn, who is slowly rising in the ranks as her mother is lowered.

Years pass, and Henry grows even colder to his daughter. She is banished, forbidden to see her mother, and is living in constant fear of death once Anne takes the throne and her mother's marriage to the King is declared null and void. She is eventually summoned back to court to serve her baby half-sister, Elizabeth. She continues to fear death at her father's hands. The novel ends in the year 1536, when Anne Boleyn is beheaded, and Henry takes a third wife, Jane Seymour. Things are starting to look up for Mary, because Jane supports her, and her father welcomes Mary back into his life. But as she enjoys herself, Mary's supporters constantly remind her that she is not completely safe, as a part of Anne Boleyn still lingers: Mary's baby half-sister, Elizabeth. Mary is told that Elizabeth will eventually grow up to be her rival to the throne, but Mary argues that Elizabeth is just a child. The book ends with a statement from Mary saying that she had not known that her sister would become her enemy, her nightmare, foreshadowing the future struggles between the two princesses.

Though she is finally in her father's favor again, considerable damage has been done. The events of the past few years have been enough to turn the princess into the bitter, cruel woman known as "Bloody Mary" for her angry persecution of English Protestants. When she became queen at the age of thirty-seven, she would burn hundreds of people at the stake for their religious belief, execute her sixteen-year-old cousin, Lady Jane Grey and imprison her own half-sister Elizabeth in the Tower of London.

=== Historical accuracy ===
Susan, Mary's friend and a main character in the novel, is portrayed as the daughter of the Thomas Howard, 3rd Duke of Norfolk, making her Anne Boleyn's first cousin. The character is likely based upon Susan Clarencieux, who was a favored maid of Mary, but she was not the daughter of the duke. He in fact had no children by the name of Susan, making the scene where he brutally strikes her for defending her mistress over the claims of her illegitimacy, causing her lip to be split open, entirely fictional.

The book depicts Mary as being crowned "princess of Wales" at age nine, officially making her heiress to the crown over her bastard half brother Henry Fitzroy. Mary was never invested as Princess of Wales. She was briefly styled as such and acted as such, but was never formally a Princess of Wales.

Anne Boleyn was much kinder and more tolerant of Mary than the portrayal in the novel. Though she did not object to Henry's dissolving of Mary's household and moving her to join the infant Elizabeth, she tried a number of times to reconcile with her stepdaughter, and all of her efforts were in vain, for Mary rebutted them all. Mary was never in danger of losing her life under Anne Boleyn's queenship, it was in fact under Jane Seymour's queenship that she feared for her life when she was forced to sign a document saying that her parents' marriage was invalid and she was a bastard. Also, despite popular myth, there is no proof that Jane Seymour actively worked for Mary's reinstatement as a princess. She was rather passive and did nothing to help Mary while she was forced to the document.

The novel also displays Mary having to wear shabby dresses for a period because the king does not send her new ones as she outgrows her attire. In reality, it was actually Elizabeth who Henry neglected to clothe after the fall of her mother. Her governess, Lady Margaret Bryan, was reduced to begging the king to send new outfits because she had outgrown them all.

Before the annulment is secured, Anne Boleyn is referred to as "Lady Anne," as it says that she was not a noble but a mere merchant's daughter. While her paternal great-grandfather was indeed a merchant, her other great grandparents were all high-ranking aristocrats. Her maternal grandfather, Thomas Howard, Duke of Norfolk was the premium noble in England. She could trace her ancestry from both sides of the family back to Edward I.

The book portrays Mary as having been summoned to attend to birth of her younger half-sister Elizabeth, which took place at Greenwich Palace. She is subsequently forced to perform all kinds of humiliating tasks for Anne, including helping her to the chamber pot. However, this did not occur and Mary was actually living at Richmond at the time.

== Beware, Princess Elizabeth ==
Beware, Princess Elizabeth
- Author: Carolyn Meyer
- Illustrator: Robert Anderson
- Cover artist: Greg Serpot
- Language: English
- Series: Young Royals
- Genre: Young-adult, Historical novel
- Publisher: Gulliver Books
- Publication date: 1 May 2001
- Publication place: USA
- Media type: Print (hardcover)
- Pages: 224
- ISBN: 0-15-202659-2
- OCLC: 45375123
- LC Class: PZ7.M5685 Be 2001
- Preceded by: Mary, Bloody Mary
- Followed by: Doomed Queen Anne

Beware, Princess Elizabeth (2001) is based on the early life of Elizabeth I of England. Told in the first person from Elizabeth's point of view, the novel covers the period between the death of Elizabeth's father, Henry VIII, and her ascent to the throne following the death of Mary (Elizabeth's life from her fourteenth to her twenty-fifth year, 1547–1558). Via Elizabeth's voice, the reader is given "a sense of being with Elizabeth and feeling the uncertainty, apprehension, and determination she feels." Throughout the novel, she suffers the vacillations of a life between luxury and suffering, treated as either a pampered princess or political prisoner, depending on the sway of power in the kingdom. She survives three reigns in the interim: Edward VI, the sickly, only-surviving son of King Henry VIII and his third wife; Lady Jane Grey, the political pawn who lasted on the throne for only nine days; and Mary, who grabs the throne by force and later has Lady Jane beheaded. Mary serves England a little reign of terror, as her personal unhappiness, religious intolerance, and inability to produce an heir leads to the death of hundreds of political opponents.

The novel frankly presents Princess Elizabeth's feelings for Thomas Seymour, who committed suicide.

Always under suspicion of treason, Princess Elizabeth is imprisoned by Queen Mary I in the Tower of London and on various estates where she is isolated and forced to pretend a conversion to Catholicism. Elizabeth's strength of will and growing popular support sustain her through the cruelty of her older half-sister, upon whose death she finally inherits the throne.

=== Historical accuracy ===
The main departure from history in Beware, Princess Elizabeth is its portrayal of Elizabeth's experience regarding Thomas Seymour. The novel depicts her as becoming smitten by Seymour and hoping to be able to marry him. He also wants the same, but has ulterior motives, wanting to be married to her solely for the fact that she is the late king's daughter and the current king's sister. Edward VI, however, refuses him permission and he instead settles for Henry VIII's widow Catherine Parr, who is also in love with him. Elizabeth accepts this, but slowly her feelings for the admiral grow, as she is living with the couple away from court. Seymour in turn flirts with her daily in a familiar way, not inappropriately, even after Catherine Parr announces that she is pregnant. This goes on until one day Elizabeth actually kisses him and his wife walks in and sees. She is then sent away to a different residence. Later, after Seymour commits treason and Elizabeth learns that the real reason for his interest in her was for her connections to the crown, she no longer feels anything for him.

The historical Thomas Seymour did attempt to marry Elizabeth but was denied permission, instead marrying Catherine Parr. However, when Elizabeth began living with the newly wed couple as Catherine's ward, Seymour tried to seduce the princess, but his methods were far from the innocent portrayal of the book. He would actually enter her bedroom before she had awakened, only partly dressed, and would sometimes tickle her or slap her buttocks. This went on until her governess, Kat Ashley, begged him to stop in order to save Elizabeth's reputation, as people had begun to gossip. He refused, indignantly stating that he would not stop because he meant no harm. Catherine started to join in and a few times came along with Seymour on his morning visits to her stepdaughter's chamber. On one occasion, in the garden, she held Elizabeth still while Seymour cut her gown into "a thousand pieces". Elizabeth herself was confused by this behavior. Sometimes she would pretend that it was just a game, and at other times she would become offended. Catherine Parr eventually put a stop to it, sending her ward away in order to preserve the remains of her reputation.

== Patience, Princess Catherine ==
Patience, Princess Catherine
- Author: Carolyn Meyer
- Language: English
- Series: Young Royals
- Genre: Young-adult, Historical novel
- Publisher: Gulliver Books
- Publication date: 1 May 2004
- Publication place: USA
- Media type: Print (hardcover)
- Pages: 208
- ISBN: 0-15-216544-4
- OCLC: 61117509
- LC Class: PZ7.M5685 Pat 2004
- Preceded by: Doomed Queen Anne
- Followed by: Duchessina: A Novel of Catherine de Medici

Patience, Princess Catherine, first published in 2004, tells the story of Catherine of Aragon from her arrival in 1501 to marry Arthur, Prince of Wales, heir to the throne of England, until her marriage to Henry VIII in 1509. She is uncertain about the marriage and fakes having intercourse by using goat's blood. Arthur dies shortly after the wedding, and the novel deals mainly with Catherine's uncertainty about her future between Arthur's death and her marriage to Henry. In the book she is constantly beset with money troubles, as the English king takes away her small allowance. At the end she marries King Henry and becomes his queen, even though people in court give conflicting accounts of whether or not Arthur and Catherine consummated their marriage, which would later lead to one of the arguments Henry had about their marriage being a contradiction to church rules.

This novel is unique to the others in that it tells the story both through Catherine's point of view, and Henry VIII's. The chapters in the book switch between the two characters, Catherine's side being printed normally, and Henry's in italics. While Catherine overcomes obstacles, Henry deals with his own problems of filling in Arthur's shoes when he dies, and the stress of having to be taught the way to rule a kingdom by his father, Henry VII of England, who up until then, largely ignored him.
