= Raymond Abrashkin =

American writer and filmmaker

- Born: March 9, 1911; Brooklyn, New York City, New York, U.S.
- Died: August 25, 1960 (aged 49); Weston, Connecticut, U.S.

Raymond Abrashkin (March 9, 1911 – August 25, 1960) was an American writer and filmmaker. He is known for writing, co-producing, and co-directing Little Fugitive and for co-creating and co-writing with Jay Williams the Danny Dunn series of science fiction books for children.

He also wrote the story "Little Cowboy" (1948).

== Family ==
Raymond's parents were Harry Abrashkin, born in what is now Kropyvnytskyi, Ukraine, and Bertha Kornfeld, born in England. Raymond was born in Brooklyn, New York.

He graduated from the City College of New York and taught in New York City public schools. His writing career began as the education editor of PM Newspaper. He became the principal writer for Young People's Records. He wrote the syndicated comic strip Timmy, drawn by Howard Sparber.

Around 1935, he married Evelyn Kurinski. They had two children, John Michael (West) Abrashkin, an artist (1941–1992), and William Henry (Hank) Abrashkin, a Trial Court Judge in Massachusetts (b. 1944). There are two grandchildren, Karen Anna Abrashkin (b. 1981) and John Raymond Abrashkin (b. 1983).

During World War II Abrashkin served in the United States Maritime Service on supply ships in the Atlantic. During and after the war, he lived in Greenwich Village, New York. In 1951 he and his family moved to a converted barn in Weston, Connecticut, where he lived for the remainder of his life.

== Little Fugitive ==
In 1952, Abrashkin wrote the screenplay for Little Fugitive under the name "Ray Ashley", which he co-produced and co-directed with Morris Engel and Ruth Orkin. The movie, which came out in 1953, was nominated for an Academy Award, and won acclaim and praise from François Truffaut as setting the stage for the French New Wave movement.

While working on the movie at Coney Island, Abrashkin was stricken with Amyotrophic Lateral Sclerosis (ALS, also known as Lou Gehrig's disease), from which he died, aged 49.
