= Jay Williams (author) =

American writer (1914–1978)

- Born: May 31, 1914; Buffalo, New York, United States
- Died: July 12, 1978 (aged 64)
- Education: University of Pennsylvania; Columbia University
- Occupation: Author
- Writing career
- Pen name: Michael Delving
- Genres: Science fiction History
- Notable work: Danny Dunn series

Jay Williams (May 31, 1914 – July 12, 1978) was an American author of science fiction (often for children), fantasy, historical fiction, non-fiction, and radical theatre.

== Early life ==
Williams was born in Buffalo, New York, the son of Max and Lillian Jacobson. He cited the experience of growing up as the son of a vaudeville show producer as leading him to pursue his acting career as early as college.

He attended both the University of Pennsylvania (1932–33) and Columbia University (1934), participating in amateur theatrical productions.

== Career ==
=== Early endeavors ===
Out of school and out of work during the end of the Great Depression, he worked as a comedian on the upstate New York Borscht Belt circuit. From 1936 until 1941, Jay Williams worked as a press agent for Dwight Deere Winman, Jed Harris and the Hollywood Theatre Alliance. Williams even played a feature role in the Cannes prize winning film, Little Fugitive, produced in 1953.

Williams served in the Army during World War II, receiving a Purple Heart. While serving, he published his first book The Stolen Oracle in 1943. After his discharge from the military in 1945, he turned his attention to writing as a full-time career.

=== Writing ===
In all, Williams authored at least 79 books including 11 picture books, 39 children's novels, 7 adult mysteries, 4 nonfiction books, 8 historical novels and a play. He is probably best known for his young adult "Danny Dunn" science fantasy series which he co-authored with Raymond Abrashkin. Though Abrashkin died in 1960, Williams insisted Abrashkin should continue to receive credit as co-author of all 15 books of this series, which continued from 1956 until 1977. Williams was reported to personally reply to over 1,000 fan letters from his juvenile readers each year.

Like his first novel, The Stolen Oracle, Williams wrote mysteries for young adults, including The Counterfeit African (1945) and The Roman Moon Mystery. He also wrote adult crime fiction, using the pseudonym Michael Delving. (This may be a reference to Michel Delving, a large hobbit-populated town in The Lord of the Rings.) One of his series of mysteries features the American rare book and manuscript collector Dave Cannon, and takes place in Britain.

Jay Williams also wrote a number of successful historical novels for adults, including The Witches, a look at the eradication of the healing women in Scotland; Solomon and Sheba; The Siege, a tale of the 13th-century wars initiated by the [Pope] against the Albigensian heresy; Tomorrow's Fire (1964), set during the Third Crusade; and The Rogue from Padua, a novel that takes place in the Renaissance.

He was also interested in the future in his many speculative science fiction tales, often published in The Magazine of Fantasy and Science Fiction; eight of these stories were published under the title Unearthly Beasts. His novel Uniad sees a world in which individuality has shrunk.

His novel The Forger examines commercialism and art, and the relation of art to real life.

Using the pseudonym "Michael Delving", Williams wrote seven mystery novels.

Williams also wrote non-fiction books: The Middle Ages, Knights of the Crusades, The Spanish Armada, and Joan of Arc, as well as his young adult Landmark book on World War II, The Battle for the North Atlantic. He was known for his extensive research in both his fiction and non-fiction.

He wrote about the environment in his Fall of the Sparrow, describing the loss of numerous animal and bird species, often due to man; and he wrote a travel book, A Change of Climate, a European trip with his son, Chris.

== Personal life ==
Williams and his wife Barbara Girsdansky were married June 3, 1941. They had a son, Christopher ("Chris"), and a daughter, Victoria.

Jay Williams died at age 64 from a heart attack while on a trip to London on July 12, 1978.
