= 6th Writers Guild of America Awards =

6th WGA Awards
- Date: 1954
- Organized by: Writers Guild of America, East and the Writers Guild of America, West

The 6th Writers Guild of America Awards honored the best film writers of 1953. Winners were announced in 1954.

== Winners and nominees ==
=== Film ===
Winners are listed first highlighted in boldface.

| **Best Written Musical**: **Lili, Written by Helen Deutsch and Paul Gallico**; Call Me Madam, Screenplay by Arthur Sheekman; based on the Musical by Russel Crouse, and Howard Lindsay; Gentlemen Prefer Blondes, Screenplay by Charles Lederer; based on the musical by Joseph Fields, and Anita Loos; Kiss Me Kate, Screenplay by Dorothy Kingsley; based on the book by Sam Spewack, and Bella Spewack; The Band Wagon; Screenplay by Betty Comden; story by Adolph Green | **Best Written Drama**: **From Here to Eternity, Screenplay by Daniel Taradash**; Above and Beyond, Screenplay by Melvin Frank, Norman Panama, and Beirne Lay Jr.; Little Fugitive, Screenplay by Ray Ashley; written by Ray Ashley, Morris Engel, and Ruth Orkin; Martin Luther, Screenplay by Allan Sloane, and Lothar Wolff; Shane, Screenplay by A. B. Guthrie Jr.; based on the novel by Jack Schaefer |
**Best Written Comedy**: **Roman Holiday, Written by Ian McLellan Hunter, Dalton Trumbo, and John Dighton**; How to Marry a Millionaire, Screenplay by Nunnally Johnson; based on the play by Zoe Akins, Dale Eunson, and Katherine Albert; Stalag 17, Screenplay by Billy Wilder, and Edwin Blum; based on the play by Donald Bevan, and Edmund Trzcinski; The Actress, Screenplay by Ruth Gordon; based on the play "Years Ago" by Ruth Gordon; The Moon Is Blue, Screenplay by F. Hugh Herbert; based on the play by F. Hugh Herbert

=== Special awards ===
Laurel Award for Screenwriting Achievement

**Dudley Nichols**
