= 24th Primetime Emmy Awards =

1972 American television programming awards

- Date: May 14, 1972
- Location: Hollywood Palladium, Los Angeles California
- Presented by: Academy of Television Arts and Sciences
- Hosted by: Johnny Carson

Highlights
- Most awards: All in the Family (6)
- Most nominations: All in the Family (10)
- Outstanding Comedy Series: All in the Family
- Outstanding Drama Series: Elizabeth R
- Outstanding Single Program - Drama or Comedy: Brian's Song
- Outstanding Variety Series - Musical: The Carol Burnett Show
- Outstanding Variety Series - Talk: The Dick Cavett Show

Television/radio coverage
- Network: CBS

The 24th Emmy Awards, later known as the 24th Primetime Emmy Awards, were handed out on May 6, 1972. The ceremony was hosted by Johnny Carson. 32 awards were presented. Winners are listed in bold and series' networks are in parentheses.

The top shows of the night were All in the Family and Elizabeth R. All in the Family set numerous records during the night, it became the first show to win six major awards, (although one came in a tie, this record would be broken by other shows that won six major awards outright). It also became the first non-anthology drama to receive at least ten major nominations.

A milestone was set when All in the Family and Columbo each received every nomination in a major category, both for writing. This feat has become extremely rare as the field of nominees expanded to five and later six.

Glenda Jackson also made history by receiving three acting nominations for the same performance as Queen Elizabeth I in Elizabeth R. Rule changes have made this impossible in later ceremonies. In addition, by beating the Big Three TV networks, this was PBS' first win for Outstanding Drama. (Though the N.E.T. network was the first to win this award, against the Big Three, in 1969, NET would eventually dissolve, but would become the direct predecessor to PBS.) This show was also the first non-American made show to win this award.

== Winners and nominees ==
Note: Winners are listed in bold type.

=== Programs ===
Programs
**Outstanding Series – Comedy**: **All in the Family (CBS)**; The Mary Tyler Moore Show (CBS); The Odd Couple (ABC); Sanford and Son (NBC)	**Outstanding Series – Drama**: **Elizabeth R (PBS)**; Columbo (NBC); Mannix (CBS); Marcus Welby, M.D. (ABC); The Six Wives of Henry VIII (CBS)
**Outstanding Variety Series – Musical**: **The Carol Burnett Show (CBS)**; The Dean Martin Comedy Hour (NBC); The Flip Wilson Show (NBC); The Sonny & Cher Comedy Hour (CBS)	**Outstanding Variety Series – Talk**: **The Dick Cavett Show (ABC)**; The David Frost Show (Syndicated); The Tonight Show Starring Johnny Carson (NBC)
**Outstanding Single Program – Variety or Musical – Variety and Popular Music**: '**S Wonderful 'S Marvelous 'S Gershwin (NBC)**; The Flip Wilson Show (NBC): "Sammy Davis Jr., Lily Tomlin and Ed McMahon"; Julie and Carol at Lincoln Center (CBS); The Sonny & Cher Comedy Hour (CBS): "Tony Randall and Honey Cone"	**Outstanding Single Program – Variety or Musical – Classical Music**: **Bernstein on Beethoven: A Celebration in Vienna (CBS)**; Heifetz (NBC); The Peking Ballet: First Spectacular from China (NBC); The Trial of Mary Lincoln (PBS)
**Outstanding Achievement in Daytime Drama – Programs**: **The Doctors (NBC)**; General Hospital (ABC)	**Outstanding Achievement in Children's Programming – Programs**: **Sesame Street (PBS)**; The Electric Company (PBS)
**Outstanding Achievement in Sports Programming**: **ABC's Wide World of Sports (ABC)**; **1971 AFC Championship Game (NBC)**; NFL Monday Night Football (ABC); Rose Bowl Game (NBC); World Series (NBC); XI Olympic Winter Games (NBC)	**Outstanding Single Program - Drama or Comedy**: **Brian's Song (ABC)**; All in the Family (CBS): "Sammy's Visit"; Elizabeth R (PBS): "The Lion's Cub"; The Snow Goose (NBC); The Six Wives of Henry VIII (CBS): "Jane Seymour"
**Outstanding New Series**: **Elizabeth R (PBS)**; Columbo (NBC); Sanford and Son (NBC); The Six Wives of Henry VIII (CBS); The Sonny & Cher Comedy Hour (CBS)

=== Acting ===
==== Lead performances ====
Acting
**Outstanding Continued Performance** **by an Actor in a Leading Role in a Comedy Series**: **Carroll O'Connor as Archie Bunker in All in the Family (CBS)**; Redd Foxx as Fred G. Sanford in Sanford and Son (NBC); Jack Klugman as Oscar Madison in The Odd Couple (ABC); Tony Randall as Felix Unger in The Odd Couple (ABC)	**Outstanding Continued Performance** **by an Actress in a Leading Role in a Comedy Series**: **Jean Stapleton as Edith Bunker in All in the Family (CBS) (Episode: "Edith’s Problem")**; Sandy Duncan as Sandy Stockton in Funny Face (CBS); Mary Tyler Moore as Mary Richards in The Mary Tyler Moore Show (CBS)
**Outstanding Continued Performance** **by an Actor in a Leading Role in a Dramatic Series**: **Peter Falk as Lt. Columbo in Columbo (NBC)**; Raymond Burr as Robert T. Ironside in Ironside (NBC); Mike Connors as Joe Mannix in Mannix (CBS); Keith Michell as Henry VIII of England in The Six Wives of Henry VIII (CBS); Robert Young as Marcus Welby in Marcus Welby, M.D. (ABC)	**Outstanding Continued Performance** **by an Actress in a Leading Role in a Dramatic Series**: **Glenda Jackson as Queen Elizabeth I in Elizabeth R (PBS)**; Peggy Lipton as Julie Barnes in The Mod Squad (ABC); Susan Saint James as Sally McMillan in McMillan & Wife (NBC)

==== Supporting performances ====
**Outstanding Performance by an Actor in a Supporting Role in a Comedy**: **Edward Asner as Lou Grant in The Mary Tyler Moore Show (CBS) (Episode: "The Six-and-a-Half-Year Itch")**; Ted Knight as Ted Baxter in The Mary Tyler Moore Show (CBS); Rob Reiner as Michael Stivic in All in the Family (CBS)	**Outstanding Performance by an Actress in a Supporting Role in a Comedy**: **Valerie Harper as Rhoda Morgenstern in The Mary Tyler Moore Show (CBS) (Episode: "Where There's Smoke There's Rhoda")**; **Sally Struthers as Gloria Stivic in All in the Family (CBS) (Episode: "Mike's Problem")**; Cloris Leachman as Phyllis Lindstrom in The Mary Tyler Moore Show (CBS)
**Outstanding Performance by an Actor in a Supporting Role in a Drama**: **Jack Warden as George Halas in Brian's Song (ABC)**; James Brolin as Dr. Steven Kiley in Marcus Welby, M.D. (ABC); Greg Morris as Barney Collier in Mission: Impossible (CBS)	**Outstanding Performance by an Actress in a Supporting Role in a Drama**: **Jenny Agutter as Frith in The Snow Goose (NBC)**; Gail Fisher as Peggy Fair in Mannix (CBS); Elena Verdugo as Consuelo Lopez in Marcus Welby, M.D. (ABC)

==== Single performances ====
**Outstanding Single Performance by an Actor in a Leading Role**: **Keith Michell as King Henry VIII in The Six Wives of Henry VIII (CBS): "Catherine Howard"**; James Caan as Brian Piccolo in Brian's Song (ABC); Richard Harris as Philip Rhayadar in The Snow Goose (NBC); George C. Scott as Edward Rochester in Jane Eyre (NBC); Billy Dee Williams as Gale Sayers in Brian's Song (ABC)	**Outstanding Single Performance by an Actress in a Leading Role**: **Glenda Jackson as Queen Elizabeth I in Elizabeth R (PBS): "The Shadow in the Sun"**; Helen Hayes as Sophie Tate Curtis in Do Not Fold Spindle or Mutilate (ABC); Glenda Jackson as Queen Elizabeth I in Elizabeth R (PBS): "The Lion's Club"; Patricia Neal as Olivia Walton in The Homecoming: A Christmas Story (CBS); Susannah York as Jane Eyre in Jane Eyre (NBC)

=== Directing ===
Directing
**Outstanding Directorial Achievement in Comedy**: **All in the Family (CBS): "Sammy's Visit" – John Rich**; The Mary Tyler Moore Show (CBS): "Thoroughly Unmilitant Mary" – Jay Sandrich; The Mary Tyler Moore Show (CBS): "Where There's Smoke There's Rhoda" – Peter Baldwin	**Outstanding Directorial Achievement in Drama –** **A Single Program of a Series with Continuing Characters and/or Theme**: **The Bold Ones: The Lawyers (NBC): "The Invasion of Kevin Ireland" – Alexander Singer**; Columbo (NBC): "Short Fuse" – Edward M. Abroms; The Man and the City (ABC): "Hands of Love" – Daniel Petrie
**Outstanding Directorial Achievement in Variety or Music**: **The Sonny & Cher Comedy Hour (CBS): "Tony Randall" – Art Fisher**; The Carol Burnett Show (CBS) – Dave Powers; The Flip Wilson Show (NBC): "Petula Clark and Redd Foxx" – Tim Kiley	**Outstanding Directorial Achievement in Comedy, Variety or Music**: '**S Wonderful 'S Marvelous 'S Gershwin (NBC) – Walter C. Miller and Martin Charnin**; Julie and Carol at Lincoln Center (CBS) – Dave Powers; Young People's Concerts: Liszt and the Devil (CBS) – Roger Englander
**Outstanding Directorial Achievement in Drama - A Single Program**: **The Glass House (CBS) – Tom Gries**; Brian's Song (ABC) – Buzz Kulik; The Homecoming: A Christmas Story (CBS) – Fielder Cook; Look Homeward, Angel (CBS) – Paul Bogart; The Snow Goose (NBC) – Patrick Garland

=== Writing ===
Writing
**Outstanding Writing Achievement in Comedy**: **All in the Family (CBS): "Edith's Problem" – Burt Styler**; All in the Family (CBS): "Mike's Problem" – Alan J. Levitt and Philip Mishkin; All in the Family (CBS): "The Saga of Cousin Oscar" – Burt Styler and Norman Lear	**Outstanding Writing Achievement in Drama**: **Columbo (NBC): "Death Lends a Hand" – Richard Levinson and William Link**; Columbo (NBC): "Murder by the Book" – Steven Bochco; Columbo (NBC): "Suitable for Framing" – Jackson Gillis
**Outstanding Writing Achievement in Comedy, Variety or Music**: **The Trial of Mary Lincoln (PBS)**; Julie and Carol at Lincoln Center (CBS); 'S Wonderful 'S Marvelous 'S Gershwin (NBC)	**Outstanding Writing Achievement in Variety or Music**: **The Carol Burnett Show (CBS): "Ray Charles"**; The Flip Wilson Show (NBC): "Sammy Davis Jr., Lily Tomlin and Ed McMahon"; The Sonny & Cher Comedy Hour (CBS): "Carroll O'Connor"
**Outstanding Writing Achievement in Drama – Original Teleplay**: **To All My Friends on Shore (CBS) – Allan Sloane**; Goodbye, Raggedy Ann (CBS) – Jack Sher; Thief (ABC) – John D.F. Black	**Outstanding Writing Achievement in Drama – Adaptation**: **Brian's Song (ABC) – William Blinn**; The Glass House (CBS) – Tracy Keenan Wynn; The Homecoming: A Christmas Story (CBS) – Earl Hamner Jr.; The Snow Goose (NBC) – Paul Gallico

== Most major nominations ==
Networks with multiple major nominations (Note: "Major" constitutes the categories listed above: Program Acting Directing and Writing. Does not include the technical categories.)
Network	Number of Nominations
CBS	47
NBC	38
ABC	21
PBS	11

Programs with multiple major awards
Program	Category	Network	Number of Nominations
All in the Family	Comedy	CBS	10
The Mary Tyler Moore Show	Comedy	CBS	8
Columbo	Drama	NBC	7
Brian's Song	Special	ABC	6
Elizabeth R	Drama	PBS	6
The Six Wives of Henry VIII	Drama	CBS	5
The Snow Goose	Special	NBC	5
The Sonny & Cher Comedy Hour	Variety	CBS	5
The Flip Wilson Show	Variety	NBC	4
Marcus Welby, M.D.	Drama	ABC	4
'S Wonderful 'S Marvelous 'S Gershwin	Variety	NBC	3
The Carol Burnett Show	Variety	CBS	3
The Homecoming: A Christmas Story	Special	CBS	3
Julie and Carol at Lincoln Center	Variety	CBS	3
The Odd Couple	Comedy	ABC	3
Mannix	Drama	CBS	3
Sanford and Son	Comedy	NBC	3
The Glass House	Special	CBS	2
Jane Eyre	Special	NBC	2
The Trial of Mary Lincoln	Variety	PBS	2

== Most major awards ==
Networks with multiple major awards
Network	Number of Awards
CBS	14
NBC	8
PBS	6
ABC	5

Programs with multiple major awards
Program	Category	Network	Number of Awards
All in the Family	Comedy	CBS	6
Elizabeth R	Drama	PBS	4
Brian's Song	Special	ABC	3
'S Wonderful 'S Marvelous 'S Gershwin	Variety	NBC	2
The Carol Burnett Show	Variety	CBS	2
The Mary Tyler Moore Show	Comedy	CBS	2
