= 1953 Academy Awards =

1953 Academy Awards may refer to:

- 25th Academy Awards, the Academy Awards ceremony that took place in 1953
- 26th Academy Awards, the 1954 ceremony honoring the best in film for 1953
