= Mary Ann Nyberg =

American costume designer (1923–1979)

- Born: February 7, 1923; Tulsa, Oklahoma, U.S.
- Died: September 19, 1979 (aged 56); Montreal, Quebec, Canada
- Other names: Mary Anne Nyberg
- Occupation: Costume designer
- Years active: 1953–1955
- Spouse: Arthur Knight (19??-1979; her death)

Mary Ann Nyberg (February 7, 1923 – September 19, 1979) was an American costume designer. Her film credits include The Band Wagon (1953), A Star is Born (1954), and Carmen Jones (1954). She was nominated for two Academy Awards.

== Partial filmography ==
Year	Title	Director	Notes
1953	Lili	Charles Walters	Credited as Mary Anne Nyberg
1953	The Band Wagon	Vincente Minnelli	
1954	A Star Is Born	George Cukor	with Jean Louis
1954	Carmen Jones	Otto Preminger	
1955	The Man with the Golden Arm	Otto Preminger	Costume supervisor

== Awards and nominations ==
Award	Year (Note: Indicates the year of ceremony. Each year is linked to the article about the awards held that year, wherever possible.)	Category	Work	Result	Ref.
Academy Awards	1954	Best Costume Design – Color	The Band Wagon	Nominated	
Academy Awards	1955	Best Costume Design – Color	A Star Is Born	Nominated	
