= 26th Academy Awards =

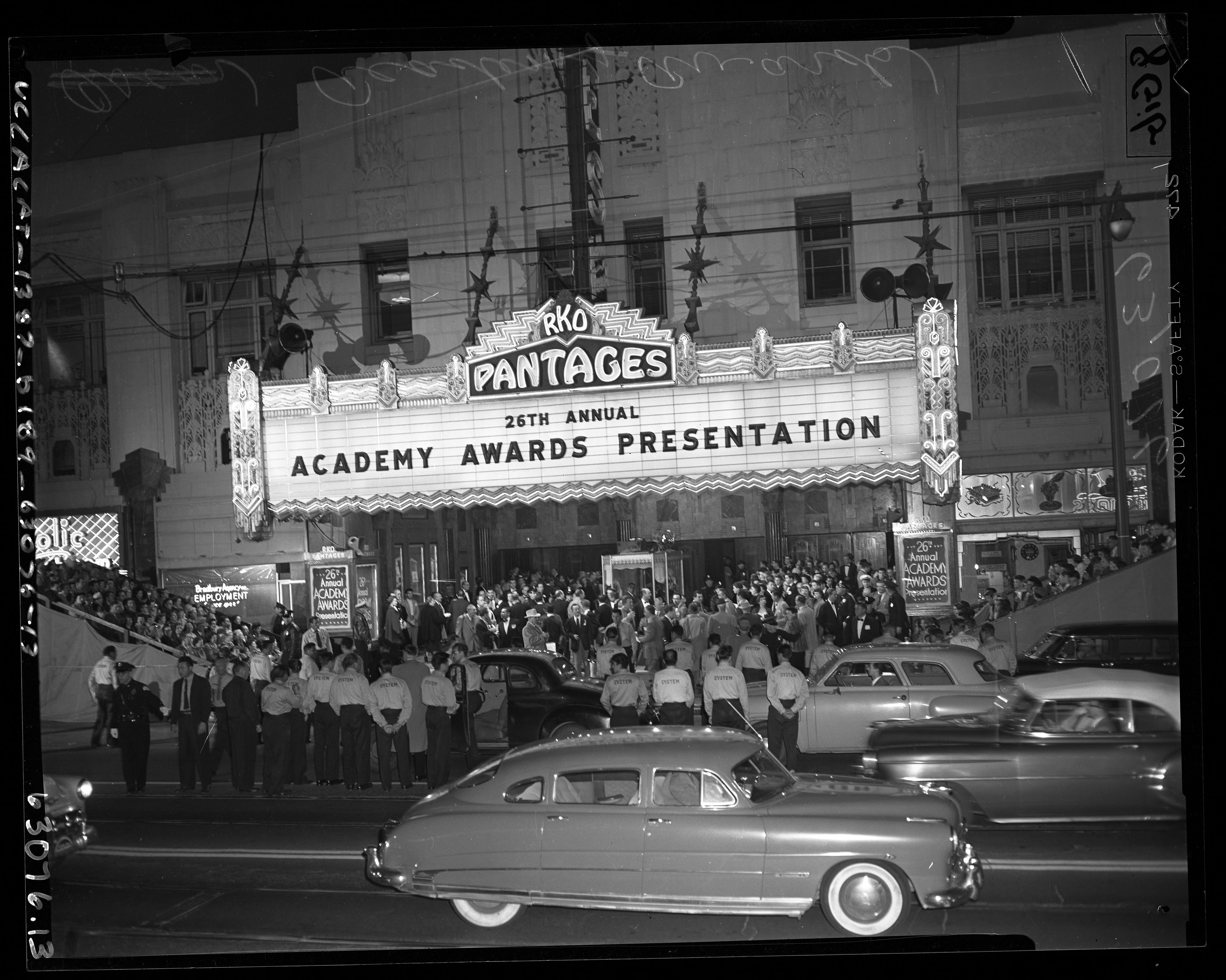
- Date: March 25, 1954
- Site: RKO Pantages Theatre; Hollywood, California; NBC Center Theatre; New York City, New York
- Hosted by: Donald O'Connor (Hollywood); Fredric March (New York City)

Highlights
- Best Picture: From Here to Eternity
- Most awards: From Here to Eternity (8)
- Most nominations: From Here to Eternity (13)

TV in the United States
- Network: NBC

The 26th Academy Awards were held on March 25, 1954, simultaneously at the RKO Pantages Theatre in Hollywood (hosted by Donald O'Connor), and the NBC Center Theatre in New York City (hosted by Fredric March).

The second national telecast of the Awards show drew an estimated 43 million viewers. Shirley Booth, appearing in a play in Philadelphia, presented the Academy Award for Best Actor through a live broadcast cut-in, having privately received the winner's name over the telephone from O'Connor. Gary Cooper pre-recorded his presentation of the Academy Award for Best Actress while on location in Mexico shooting Garden of Evil, with O'Connor then announcing the winner's name live.

All the major winners in this year were black-and-white films. Fred Zinnemann's From Here to Eternity won eight awards from its thirteen nominations: Best Picture, Best Supporting Actor, Best Supporting Actress, Academy Award for Best Director, Best Screenplay (Daniel Taradash), Best Cinematography, Black-and-White (Burnett Guffey), Best Sound Recording, and Best Film Editing. It was the third film to receive five acting nominations. Its eight awards matched the record set by Gone with the Wind in 1939. Walt Disney won four awards, a record shared by him and Sean Baker for most Oscars won by a single person in the same year (Bong Joon Ho won three at the 92nd Academy Awards (Note: Technically, the country of the film is recognized as winner of the Best International Feature award. However, the award is accepted by the director on behalf of the country, and since 2014, the director's name is engraved on the statuette.) and accepted a fourth for Best International Feature on behalf of South Korea.)

William Holden's acceptance speech for Best Actor for Stalag 17 was simply "Thank You", making it one of the shortest speeches on record, as it was cut short by the broadcast cut to a commercial. Holden, frustrated, later personally paid for advertisements in the Hollywood trade publications to thank everyone he had wanted to in his speech, remarked that he felt that either Burt Lancaster or Montgomery Clift should have won the Oscar for From Here to Eternity instead of him, and expounded backstage on a system he felt valued commercials over program content; NBC had cut to commercials during the middle of other acceptance speeches as well that evening.

== Winners and nominees ==
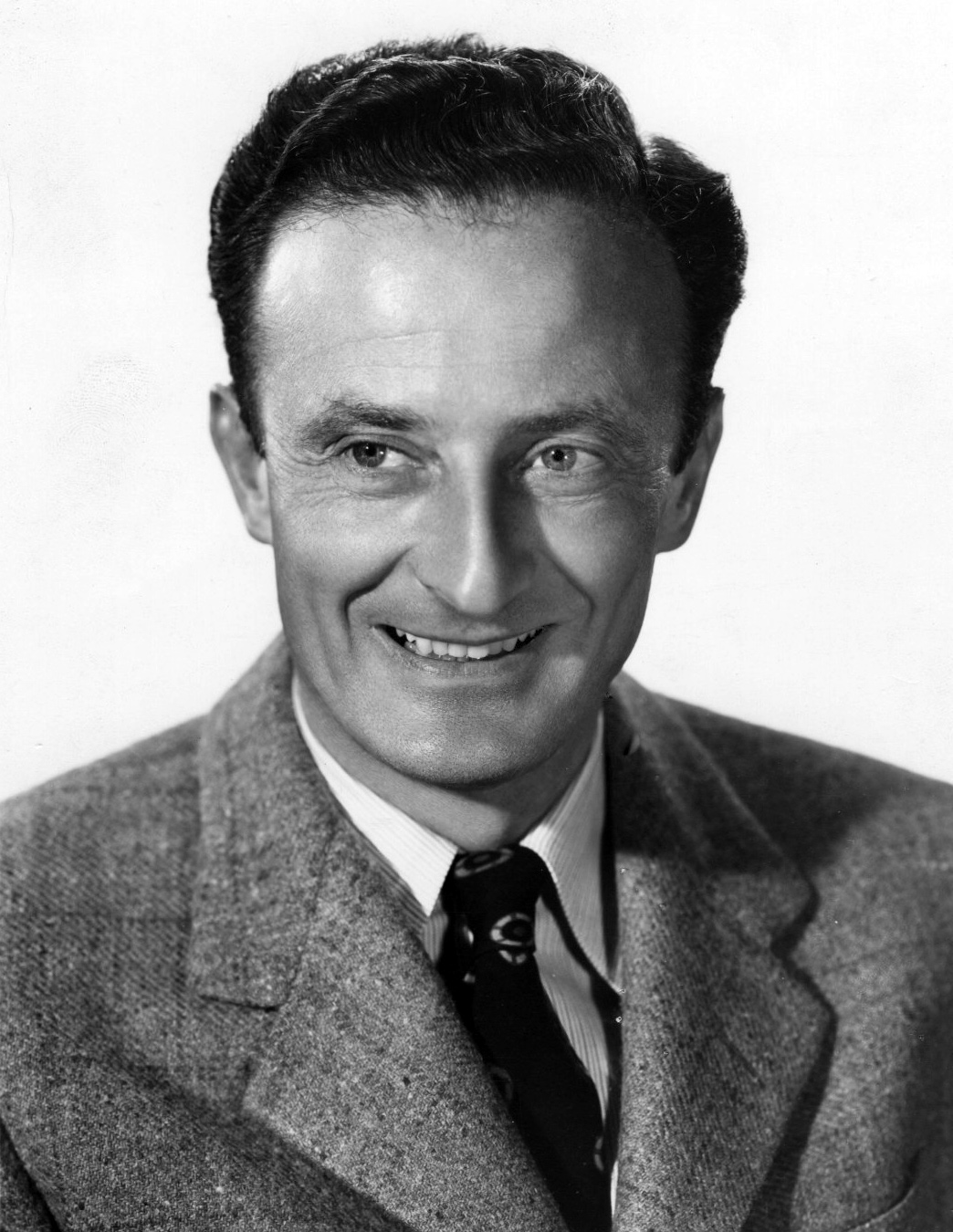
Fred Zinnemann; Best Director winner

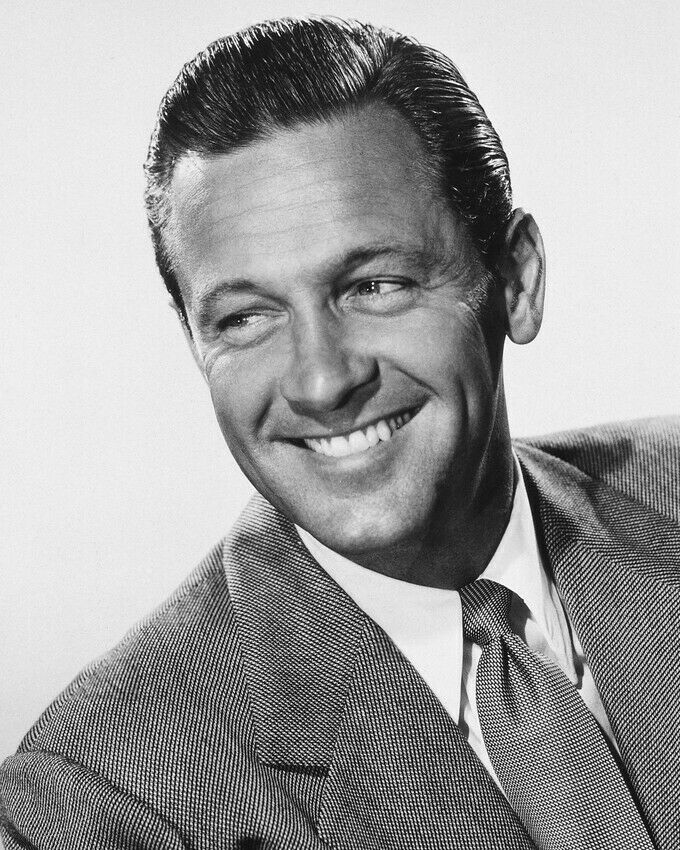
William Holden; Best Actor winner

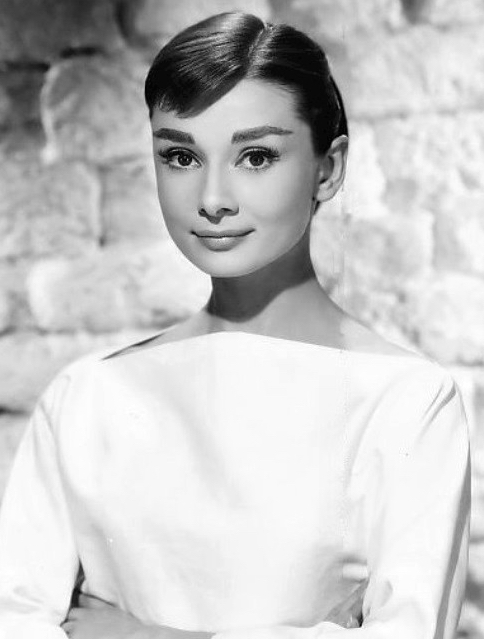
Audrey Hepburn; Best Actress winner

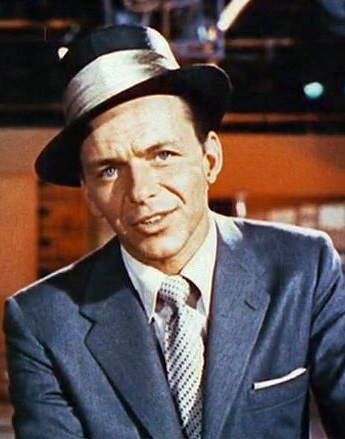
Frank Sinatra; Best Supporting Actor winner

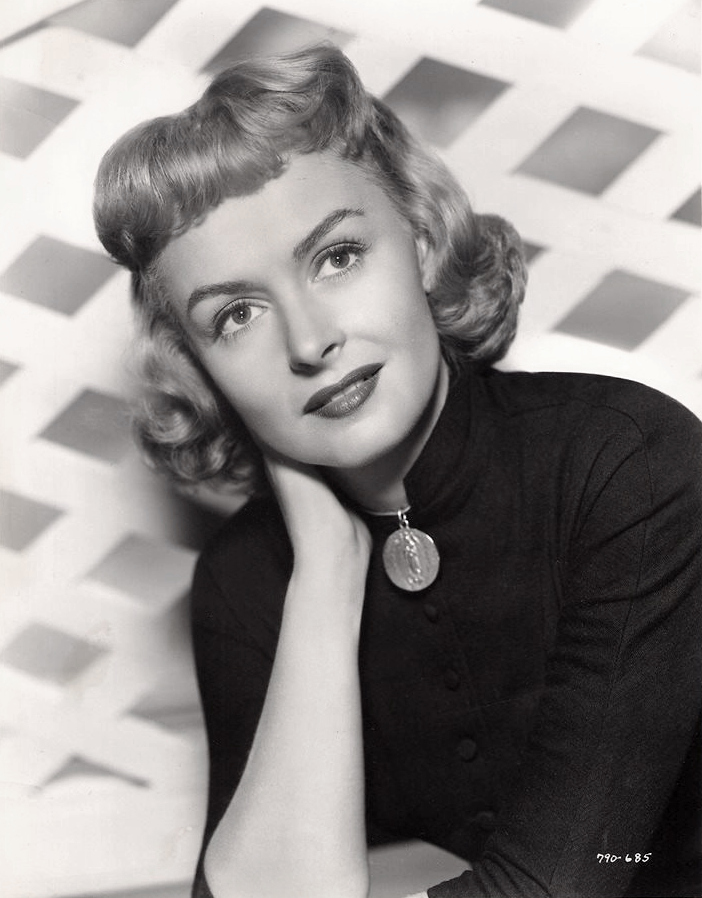
Donna Reed; Best Supporting Actress winner

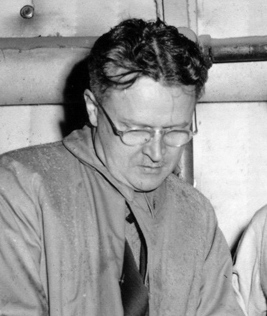
Charles Brackett; Best Story and Screenplay co-winner

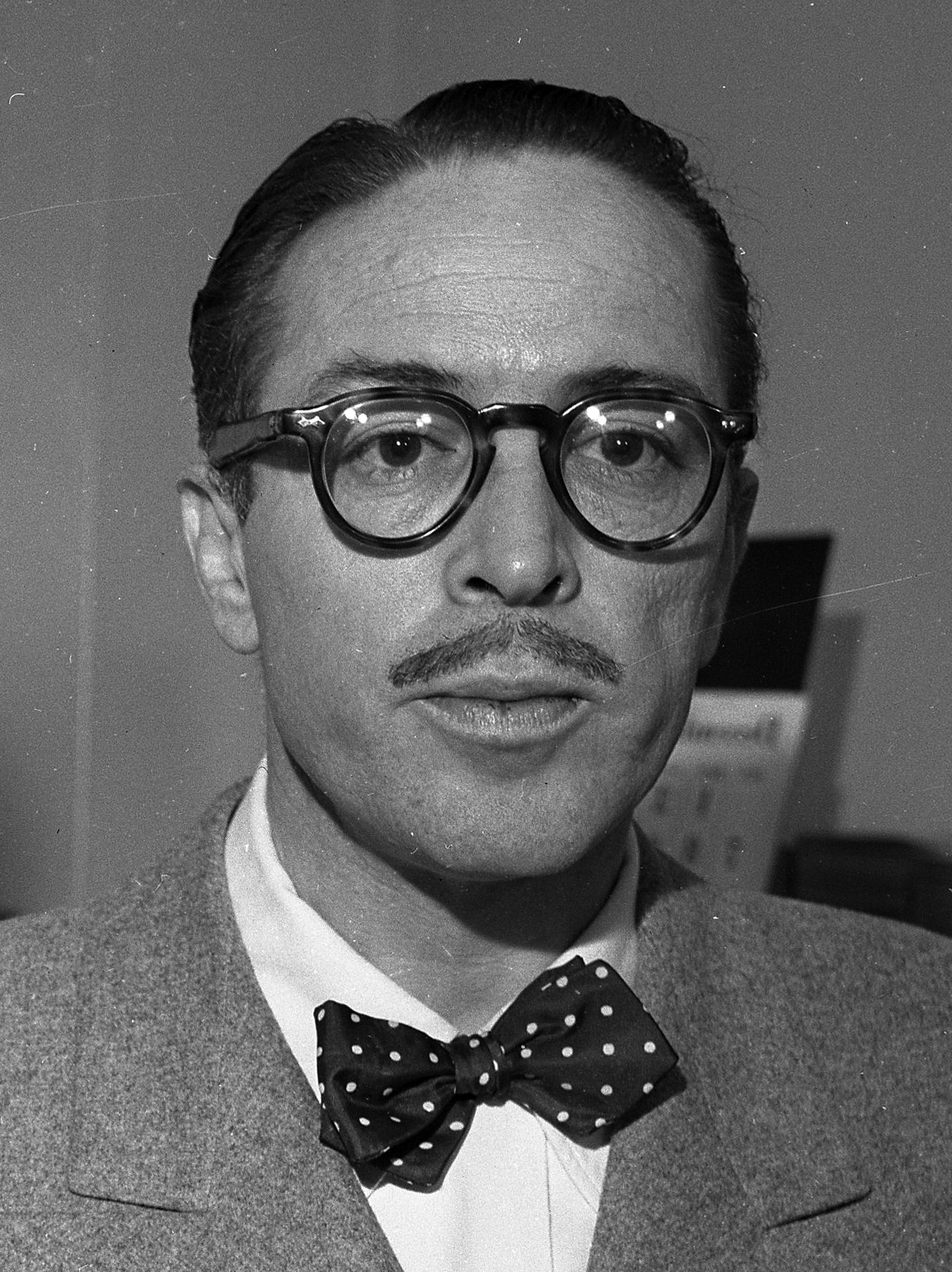
Dalton Trumbo; Best Story winner

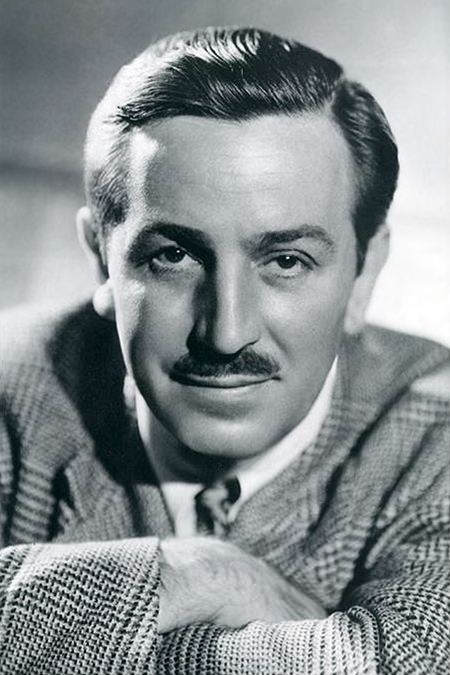
Walt Disney; Best Animated Short Film, Best Documentary Feature, Best Documentary Short Subject and Best Live Action Short Subject, Two-Reel winner

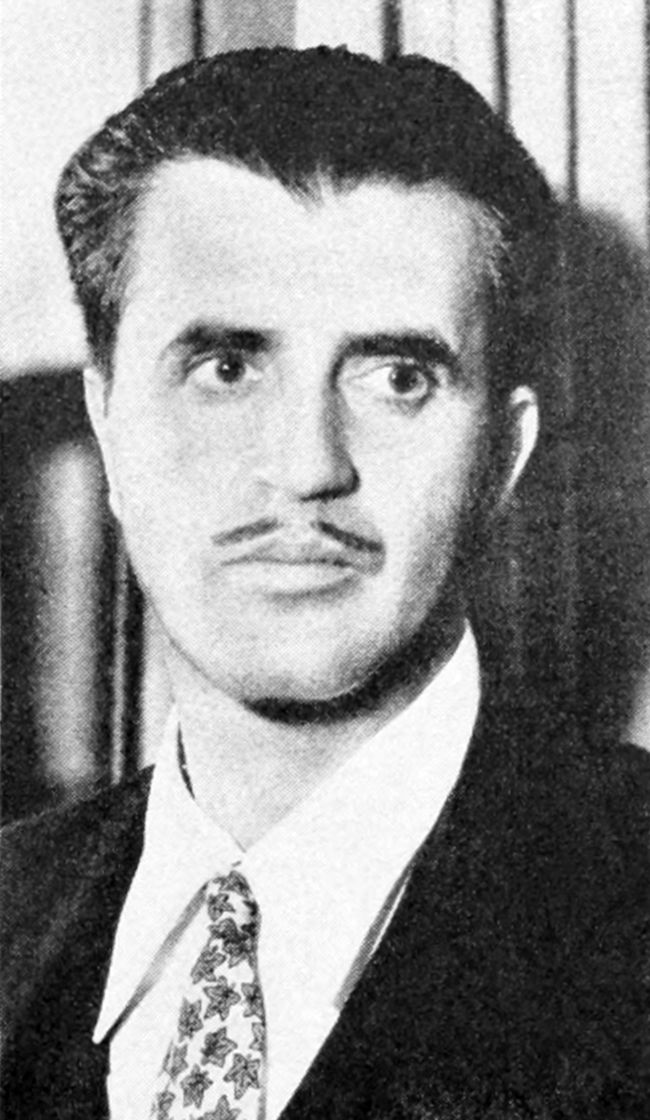
Cedric Gibbons; Best Art Direction, Black-and-White co-winner

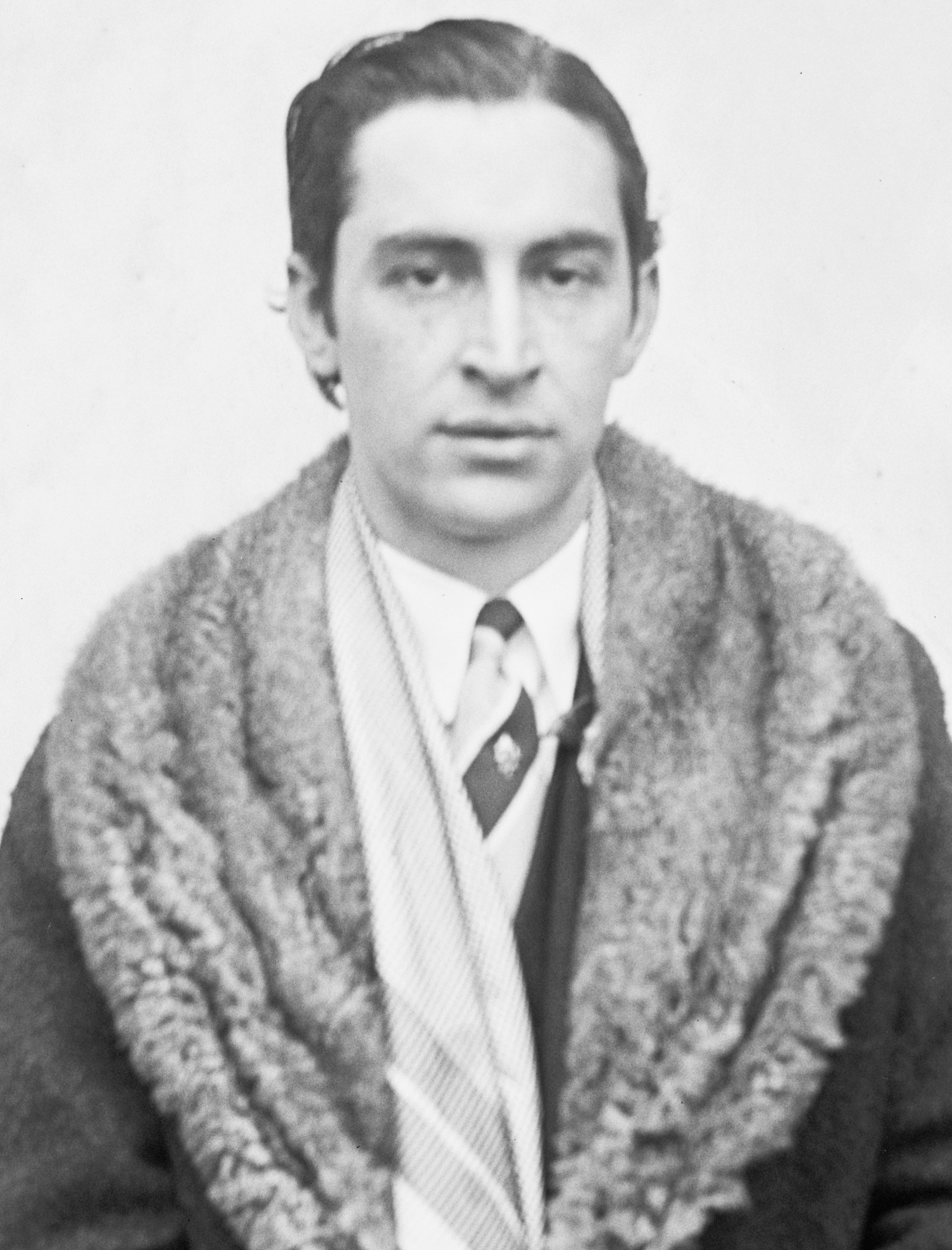
Charles LeMaire; Best Costume Design, Color winner

=== Awards ===
Nominees were announced on February 15, 1954. Winners are listed first and highlighted in boldface.

**Best Motion Picture**: **From Here to Eternity – Buddy Adler for Columbia Pictures**; Julius Caesar – John Houseman for Metro-Goldwyn-Mayer; The Robe – Frank Ross for 20th Century Fox; Roman Holiday – William Wyler for Paramount Pictures; Shane – George Stevens for Paramount Pictures	**Best Directing**: **Fred Zinnemann – From Here to Eternity**; Charles Walters – Lili; William Wyler – Roman Holiday; George Stevens – Shane; Billy Wilder – Stalag 17
**Best Actor**: **William Holden – Stalag 17 as J. J. Sefton**; Marlon Brando – Julius Caesar as Mark Antony; Richard Burton – The Robe as Marcellus Gallio; Montgomery Clift – From Here to Eternity as Private Robert E. Lee "Prew" Prewitt; Burt Lancaster – From Here to Eternity as First Sergeant Milton Warden	**Best Actress**: **Audrey Hepburn – Roman Holiday as Princess Ann**; Leslie Caron – Lili as Lili Daurier; Ava Gardner – Mogambo as Eloise Kelly; Deborah Kerr – From Here to Eternity as Karen Holmes; Maggie McNamara – The Moon Is Blue as Patty O'Neill
**Best Actor in a Supporting Role**: **Frank Sinatra – From Here to Eternity as Private Angelo Maggio**; Eddie Albert – Roman Holiday as Irving Radovich; Brandon deWilde – Shane as Joey Starrett; Jack Palance – Shane as Jack Wilson; Robert Strauss – Stalag 17 as Stanislas "Animal" Kuzawa	**Best Actress in a Supporting Role**: **Donna Reed – From Here to Eternity as Alma Burke/Lorene**; Grace Kelly – Mogambo as Linda Nordley; Geraldine Page – Hondo as Angie Lowe; Marjorie Rambeau – Torch Song as Mrs. Stewart; Thelma Ritter – Pickup on South Street as Moe
**Best Writing (Motion Picture Story)**: **Roman Holiday – Dalton Trumbo** (awarded posthumously as Trumbo was on the Hollywood blacklist); Above and Beyond – Beirne Lay Jr.; The Captain's Paradise – Alec Coppel; ~~Hondo – Louis L'Amour~~ (nomination revoked); Little Fugitive – Ray Ashley, Morris Engel, and Ruth Orkin	**Best Writing (Story and Screenplay)**: **Titanic – Charles Brackett, Walter Reisch and Richard L. Breen**; The Band Wagon – Betty Comden and Adolph Green; The Desert Rats – Richard Murphy; The Naked Spur – Sam Rolfe and Harold Jack Bloom; Take the High Ground! – Millard Kaufman
**Best Writing (Screenplay)**: **From Here to Eternity – Daniel Taradash from From Here to Eternity by James Jones**; The Cruel Sea – Eric Ambler from The Cruel Sea by Nicholas Monsarrat; Lili – Helen Deutsch from "Love of Seven Dolls" by Paul Gallico; Roman Holiday – Ian McLellan Hunter and John Dighton from a story by Dalton Trumbo; Shane – A.B. Guthrie Jr. from Shane by Jack Schaefer	**Best Documentary (Feature)**: **The Living Desert – Walt Disney**; The Conquest of Everest – John Taylor, Leon Clore and Grahame Tharp; A Queen Is Crowned – Castleton Knight
**Best Documentary (Short Subject)**: **The Alaskan Eskimo – Walt Disney**; The Living City – John Barnes; Operation Blue Jay – United States Army Signal Corps; They Planted a Stone – James Carr; The Word – John Healy and John Adams	**Best Short Subject (One-Reel)**: **Overture to The Merry Wives of Windsor – Johnny Green**; Christ Among the Primitives – Vincenzo Lucci-Chiarissi; Herring Hunt – National Film Board of Canada; Joy of Living – Boris Vermont; Wee Water Wonders – Jack Eaton
**Best Short Subject (Two-Reel)**: **Bear Country – Walt Disney**; Ben and Me – Walt Disney; Return to Glennascaul – Dublin Gate Theatre Productions; Vesuvius Express – Otto Lang; Winter Paradise – Cedric Francis	**Best Short Subject (Cartoon)**: **Toot, Whistle, Plunk and Boom – Walt Disney**; Christopher Crumpet – Stephen Bosustow; From A to Z-Z-Z-Z – Edward Selzer; Rugged Bear – Walt Disney; The Tell-Tale Heart – Stephen Bosustow
**Best Music (Music Score of a Dramatic or Comedy Picture)**: **Lili – Bronisław Kaper**; Above and Beyond – Hugo Friedhofer; From Here to Eternity – Morris Stoloff and George Duning; Julius Caesar – Miklós Rózsa; This Is Cinerama – Louis Forbes	**Best Music (Scoring of a Musical Picture)**: **Call Me Madam – Alfred Newman**; The 5,000 Fingers of Dr. T. – Frederick Hollander and Morris Stoloff; The Band Wagon – Adolph Deutsch; Calamity Jane – Ray Heindorf; Kiss Me Kate – André Previn and Saul Chaplin
**Best Music (Song)**: **"Secret Love" from Calamity Jane – Music by Sammy Fain; Lyrics by Paul Francis Webster**; "The Moon Is Blue" from The Moon Is Blue – Music by Herschel Burke Gilbert; Lyrics by Sylvia Fine; "My Flaming Heart" from Small Town Girl – Music by Nicholas Brodszky; Lyrics by Leo Robin; "Sadie Thompson's Song" from Miss Sadie Thompson – Music by Lester Lee; Lyrics by Ned Washington; "That's Amore" from The Caddy – Music by Harry Warren; Lyrics by Jack Brooks	**Best Sound Recording**: **From Here to Eternity – John P. Livadary**; Calamity Jane – William A. Mueller; Knights of the Round Table – A. W. Watkins; The Mississippi Gambler – Leslie I. Carey; The War of the Worlds – Loren L. Ryder
**Best Art Direction (Black-and-White)**: **Julius Caesar – Art Direction: Cedric Gibbons and Edward Carfagno; Set Decoration: Edwin B. Willis and Hugh Hunt**; Martin Luther – Art Direction and Set Decoration: Fritz Maurischat and Paul Markwitz; The President's Lady – Art Direction: Lyle R. Wheeler and Leland Fuller; Set Decoration: Paul S. Fox; Roman Holiday – Art Direction and Set Decoration: Hal Pereira and Walter Tyler; Titanic – Art Direction: Lyle R. Wheeler and Maurice Ransford; Set Decoration: Stuart A. Reiss	**Best Art Direction (Color)**: **The Robe – Art Direction: Lyle R. Wheeler and George Davis; Set Decoration: Walter M. Scott and Paul S. Fox**; Knights of the Round Table – Art Direction: Alfred Junge and Hans Peters; Set Decoration: John Jarvis; Lili – Art Direction: Cedric Gibbons and Paul Groesse; Set Decoration: Edwin B. Willis and Arthur Krams; The Story of Three Loves – Art Direction: Cedric Gibbons, E. Preston Ames, Edward Carfagno and Gabriel Scognamillo; Set Decoration: Edwin B. Willis, F. Keogh Gleason, Arthur Krams and Jack D. Moore; Young Bess – Art Direction: Cedric Gibbons and Urie McCleary; Set Decoration: Edwin B. Willis and Jack D. Moore
**Best Cinematography (Black-and-White)**: **From Here to Eternity – Burnett Guffey**; The Four Poster – Hal Mohr; Julius Caesar – Joseph Ruttenberg; Martin Luther – Joseph C. Brun; Roman Holiday – Franz Planer and Henri Alekan	**Best Cinematography (Color)**: **Shane – Loyal Griggs**; All the Brothers Were Valiant – George Folsey; Beneath the 12-Mile Reef – Edward Cronjager; Lili – Robert H. Planck; The Robe – Leon Shamroy
**Best Costume Design (Black-and-White)**: **Roman Holiday – Edith Head**; The Actress – Walter Plunkett; Dream Wife – Helen Rose and Herschel McCoy; From Here to Eternity – Jean Louis; The President's Lady – Charles LeMaire and Renié	**Best Costume Design (Color)**: **The Robe – Charles LeMaire and Emile Santiago**; The Band Wagon – Mary Ann Nyberg; Call Me Madam – Irene Sharaff; How to Marry a Millionaire – Charles LeMaire and William Travilla; Young Bess – Walter Plunkett
**Best Film Editing**: **From Here to Eternity – William Lyon**; Crazylegs – Irvine (Cotton) Warburton; The Moon Is Blue – Otto Ludwig; Roman Holiday – Robert Swink; The War of the Worlds – Everett Douglas

=== Best Special Effects ===
- The War of the Worlds – Paramount Studio.

=== Honorary Awards ===
- To Pete Smith for his witty and pungent observations on the American scene in his series of Pete Smith Specialties.
- To 20th Century-Fox Film Corporation in recognition of their imagination, showmanship and foresight in introducing the revolutionary process known as CinemaScope.
- To Joseph I. Breen for his conscientious, open-minded and dignified management of the Motion Picture Production Code.
- To Bell and Howell Company for their pioneering and basic achievements in the advancement of the motion picture industry.

=== Irving G. Thalberg Memorial Award ===
- George Stevens

== Presenters and performers ==
=== Presenters ===
Name(s)	Role
Elizabeth Taylor and Michael Wilding	Presenters of the Documentary Awards
Jack Webb	Presenter of the award for Best Sound Recording
Keefe Brasselle and Marilyn Erskine	Presenters of the Short Subject Awards
Esther Williams	Presenter of the award for Best Film Editing
Gene Tierney	Presenter of the awards for Costume Design
Gower Champion; Marge Champion	Presenters of the award for Art Direction
Lex Barker and Lana Turner	Presenters of the awards for Cinematography
Kirk Douglas	Presenter of the Writing awards
Irene Dunne	Presenter of the award for Best Director
Walter Brennan	Presenter of the award for Best Supporting Actress
Mercedes McCambridge	Presenter of the award for Best Supporting Actor
Arthur Freed	Presenter of the Music awards
Gary Cooper	Presenter of the award for Best Actress
Shirley Booth	Presenter of the award for Best Actor
Cecil B. DeMille	Presenter of the award for Best Motion Picture
Merle Oberon	Presenter of the award for Best Special Effects
Charles Brackett	Presenter of the Honorary Awards
Tyrone Power	Presenter of the Scientific & Technical Awards
David O. Selznick	Presenter of the Irving G. Thalberg Award

=== Performers ===
Name(s)	Role
André Previn	Conductor the Academy Awards orchestra
Mitzi Gaynor and Donald O'Connor	Performers of "The Moon Is Blue" from The Moon Is Blue
Connie Russell	Performer of "Sadie Thompson's Song (Blue Pacific Blues)" from Miss Sadie Thompson
Ann Blyth	Performer of "Secret Love" from Calamity Jane
Dean Martin	Performer of "That's Amore" from The Caddy

== Multiple nominations and awards ==
Films with multiple nominations
Nominations	Film
13	From Here to Eternity
10	Roman Holiday
6	Lili
6	Shane
5	Julius Caesar
5	The Robe
3	The Band Wagon
3	Calamity Jane
3	The Moon Is Blue
3	Stalag 17
2	Above and Beyond
2	Call Me Madam
2	Knights of the Round Table
2	Martin Luther
2	Mogambo
2	The President's Lady
2	Titanic
2	The War of the Worlds (Note: Not counting the non-competitive Best Special Effects Award for The War of the Worlds.)
2	Young Bess

Films with multiple awards
Awards	Film
8	From Here to Eternity
3	Roman Holiday
2	The Robe

== See also ==
- 11th Golden Globe Awards
- 1953 in film
- 5th Primetime Emmy Awards
- 6th Primetime Emmy Awards
- 7th British Academy Film Awards
- 8th Tony Awards
