= Joseph C. Brun =

French-American cinematographer (1907-1998)

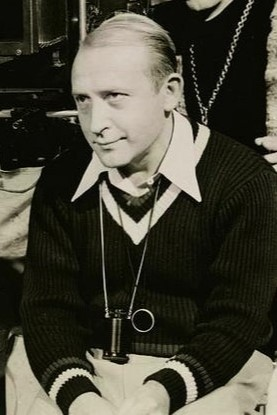
- Joseph C. Brun on the set of Martin Luther in 1953
- Born: April 21, 1907; Paris, France
- Died: November 13, 1998 (aged 91); Palm Beach, Florida
- Other name: Joseph Brun
- Occupation: Cinematographer
- Years active: 1951–1974

Joseph C. Brun (April 21, 1907 – November 13, 1998) was a French-American cinematographer who did movies as well as a couple early TV shows.

He was nominated for Best Cinematography-Black and White at the 26th Academy Awards for the film Martin Luther.'

== Career ==
By the late 1950s Brun was an established member of the American Society of Cinematographers; the magazine's 1959 production listings show him working in New York on Middle of the Night for Columbia Pictures and on Odds Against Tomorrow for Harry Belafonte's HarBel Productions. The United Artists publicity material for Odds Against Tomorrow described him as a "veteran cinematographer" and noted his Academy Award nomination for Martin Luther and his earlier photography for Cinerama Holiday,Windjammer (billed as Cinemiracle Adventure) and Budd Schulberg's Wind Across the Everglades

=== Odds Against Tomorrow ===
Brun wrote an article for the August 1959 issue of American Cinematographer about shooting Odds Against Tomorrow for director Robert Wise. He recalled that Wise told him he wanted an atmosphere of increasing menace building to a catastrophic climax, and that the production would ignore the conventions of ordinary visualization, which Brun took to be a serious creative directive. Reviewing the film in 2023 after a Glasgow Film Festival screening, Jennie Kermode of Eye for Film praised the framing by Wise and Brun for adding menace to the urban setting, and noted that Brun lit Belafonte to emphasize the similarity between the characters' skin tones, setting them against a world of shadows and industrial forms.

== Filmography ==
- The Hunted (1972)
- The 300 Year Weekend (1971)
- Explosion (1969)
- Slaves (1969)
- Trilogy (1969)
- The Fat Spy (1966)
- Who Killed Teddy Bear (1965) (as Joseph Brun)
- Flipper (1963) (as Joseph Brun)
- Hatari! (1962) (associate photographer) (as Joseph Brun)
- Girl of the Night (1960)
- Thunder in Carolina (1960)
- The Last Mile (1959)
- Middle of the Night (1959)
- Odds Against Tomorrow (1959)
- Wind Across the Everglades (1958) (as Joseph Brun)
- Windjammer (1958)
- Edge of the City (1957) (as Joseph Brun)
- Naughty Girl (1957) (as Joseph Brun)
- Cinerama Holiday (1955)
- Love at Night (1955)
- Montmartre Nights (1955)
- Special Delivery (1955)
- The Joe Louis Story (1953) (as Joseph Brun)
- Martin Luther (1953)
- Walk East on Beacon! (1952) (as Joseph Brun)
- The Whistle at Eaton Falls (1951) (as Joseph Brun)
