= Gloria Foster =

American actress (1933–2001)

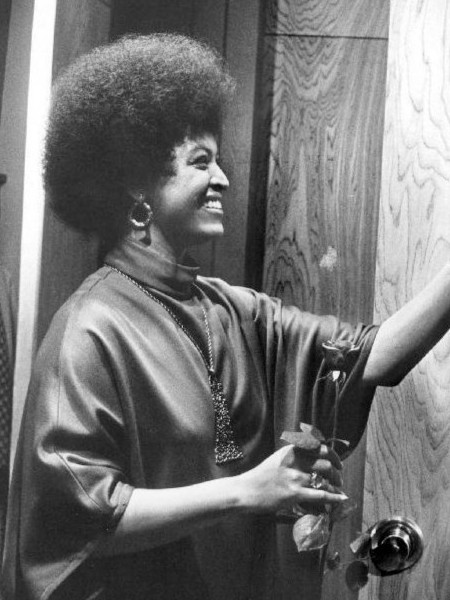
- Foster in 1970
- Born: November 15, 1933; Chicago, Illinois, U.S.
- Died: September 29, 2001 (aged 67); The Bronx, New York, U.S.
- Occupation: Actress
- Years active: 1963–2001
- Spouse: Clarence Williams III (m. 1967; div. 1984)

Gloria Foster (November 15, 1933 – September 29, 2001) was an American actress. She had acclaimed roles in plays such as In White America and Having Our Say, winning three Obie Awards during her career. Foster played the Oracle in The Matrix (1999) and its first sequel, The Matrix Reloaded (2003). She played the role of the mother of Yusef Bell in the miniseries The Atlanta Child Murders which aired in 1985.

== Early life and education ==
Foster was born on November 15, 1933, in Chicago, Illinois. As a young child, Foster was put into the custody of her maternal grandparents. Foster never knew who her father was and she moved to Janesville, Wisconsin after her mother was hospitalized for a mental illness.

Foster attended the University of Illinois Chicago, where she participated in plays, but did not focus on acting. Foster decided to be a professional actor when her godmother introduced her to the Goodman Theatre in Chicago. Foster became one of the few African Americans at the Goodman School of Drama at the Art Institute of Chicago (now at DePaul University). During her studying at the Goodman School she also, "learned professional acting skills in the Court Theater at the University of Chicago". One of her most influential instructors was Bella Itkin, who cast Gloria in many classical roles.

== Career ==
Foster began acting on Broadway in 1963. Her first role was Ruth in the play A Raisin in the Sun. Her first professional performance was in another play called In White America. In that play, Foster "plays a 13-year-old Arkansas girl who tries to enter her Little Rock school". She won an Obie Award which is an off-Broadway theater award. People started to create parts for her, rather than expecting her to audition for roles. Foster was known for her work with Joe Papp, and appeared in his productions of Long Day's Journey into Night, Chekhov's Cherry Orchard, Brecht's Mother Courage (adapted by Ntozake Shange), and Shakespeare's Coriolanus. Foster searched for roles in which she could perform to the best of her ability. She once said, "Young people today, I think, are thinking in terms of stepping stones…I don't know that I ever thought that way. It sounds ridiculous, but I was always thinking in terms of a more difficult role".

Moving from the New York stage, Foster started to do roles on the big screen. She was in many theatrical performances and also performed some roles on television. The Cool World (1963) was Foster's first appearance in a full-length feature film. In it, she played Mrs. Custis. It was on the set of this film that she met her future husband, Clarence Williams III. In Nothing But a Man (1964), Foster plays a woman named Lee, who lives with the main character's (Duff Anderson) father. She was also active in television, appearing in such programs as I Spy, two episodes of Law & Order and The Cosby Show (1987).

Her character in both Law and Order episodes, named Satima Tate, was based on the widow of Malcolm X, Betty Shabazz. The first episode, titled Conspiracy (1992), was based on Malcolm X's assassination. Malcolm X was played by Hal Miller. The second episode, titled Entrapment (1997), focused on her character's children's acts of revenge against the people they believed were really responsible. She returned to theatre again in 1995, acting alongside Mary Alice (who was to later replace her in the second sequel of The Matrix following her death), appearing as 103-year-old Sadie Delany, in Having Our Say, on Broadway at the Booth Theatre, for which she received rave reviews. She played the Oracle in The Matrix (1999) and The Matrix Reloaded (2003); however, she died during filming of the second film and was thus unable to portray her role in the third film. As a result, Mary Alice replaced her in The Matrix Revolutions and Enter the Matrix.

== Personal life and death ==
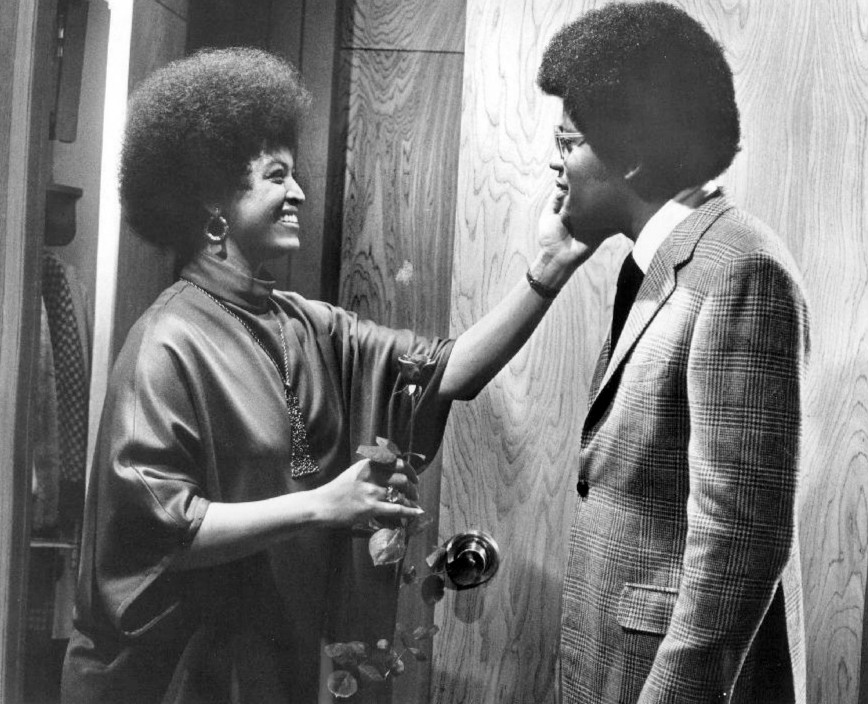
Foster and Williams in an episode of The Mod Squad in 1970. Foster guest starred as a blind friend of Linc Hayes.

Foster married the actor Clarence Williams III in 1967. She appeared on Williams's television show The Mod Squad that ran from 1968 to 1973; Foster made two guest appearances. The two acted together in a 1963 film, The Cool World. They later divorced in 1984. Williams was the one to announce her death in 2001. While Foster did not have many close relatives, she stayed in contact with her Delta Sigma Theta sorority sister, Cicely Tyson. Tyson stated that, although they did not see each other often, their telephone conversations would often last for hours.

Foster died on September 29, 2001, at the age of 67. The cause of her death was diabetes. A memorial was held at Cypress Hills Cemetery in Brooklyn on October 15, 2001. Martin Duberman, the author of In White America, told the audience about her 1963 performance that, "she embodied it. At the end of the scene each night, there were tears streaming down her face, her body was trembling, but her dignity was intact … Foster had to be covered with blankets in order to calm her shaking".

== Filmography ==
=== Film ===
- The Cool World (1963) as Mrs. Custis
- Nothing But a Man (1964) as Lee
- The Comedians (1967) as Mrs. Philipot
- The Angel Levine (1970) as Sally
- Man and Boy (1972) as Ivy Revers
- Leonard Part 6 (1987) as Medusa
- City of Hope (1991) as Jeanette
- The Matrix (1999) as The Oracle
- The Matrix Reloaded (2003) as The Oracle (released posthumously)
- The Matrix Resurrections (2021) as The Oracle (archive footage)

=== Television ===
- I Spy (1968) as Shana
- The Outcasts (1968), "Take Your Lover in The Ring", Episode #5, as Sabina
- Mod Squad (1969) as Jenny
- The Bill Cosby Show (1970) as Dolores Winters
- To All My Friends on Shore (1972) as Serena
- Top Secret (1978) as Judith
- The Files on Jill Hatch (1983) as Mrs. Hatch
- House of Dies Drear (1984) as Sheila Small
- The Atlanta Child Murders (1985) (miniseries) as Camille Bell
- The Cosby Show (1987) as Dr. Barbara Bracy
- Separate but Equal (1991) as Buster
- Law & Order (1992 and 1997) as Mrs. Tate
- Percy & Thunder (1993) as Sugar Brown
