= Stalag 17 =

1953 film by Billy Wilder

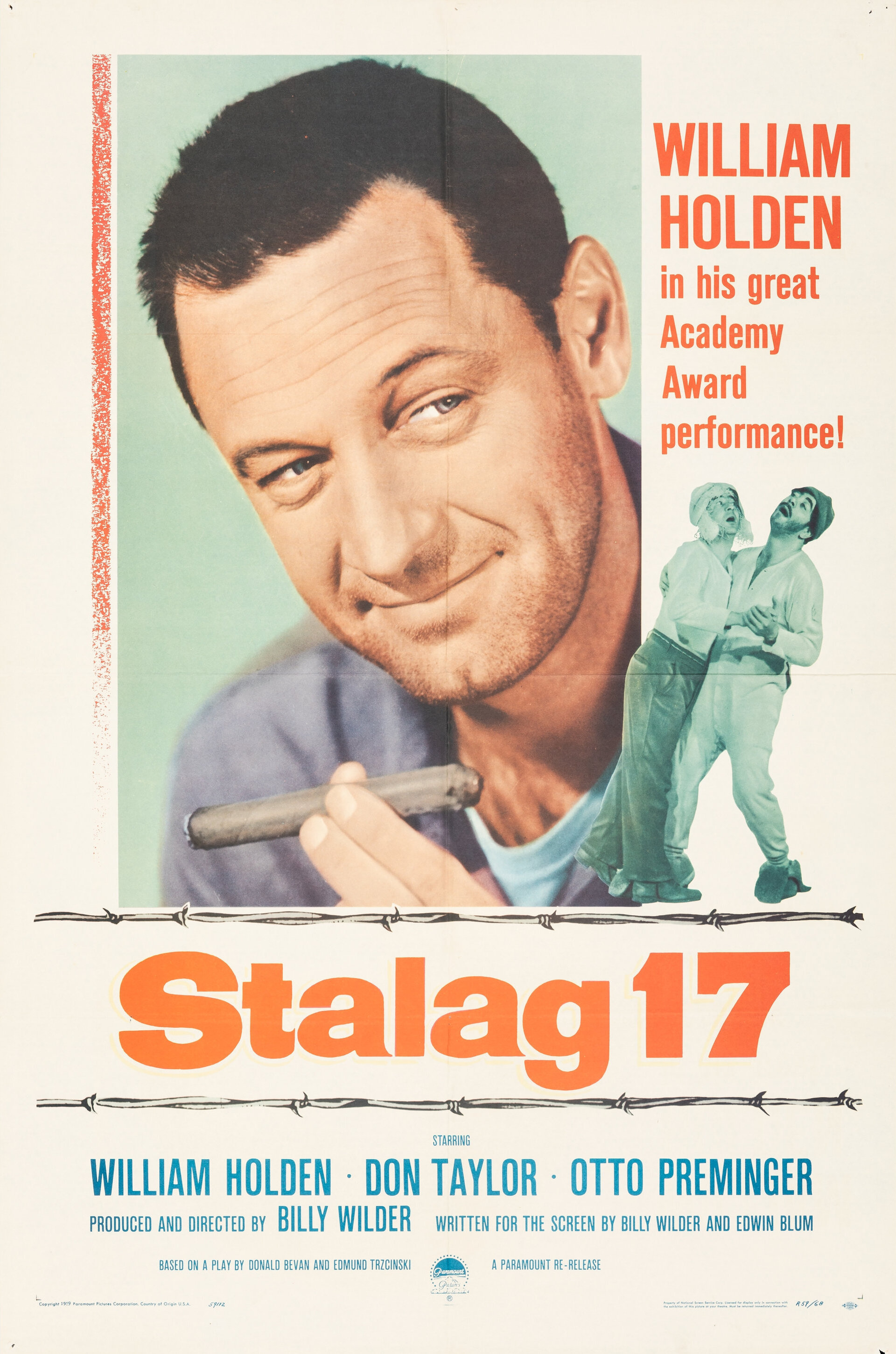
- 1959 Theatrical re-release poster
- Directed by: Billy Wilder
- Screenplay by: Edwin Blum; Billy Wilder
- Based on: Stalag 17; 1951 play by: Donald Bevan; Edmund Trzcinski
- Produced by: Billy Wilder
- Starring: William Holden; Don Taylor; Otto Preminger
- Narrated by: Gil Stratton
- Cinematography: Ernest Laszlo
- Edited by: George Tomasini
- Music by: Franz Waxman
- Distributed by: Paramount Pictures
- Release dates: May 29, 1953 (UK); June 6, 1953 (US)
- Running time: 120 minutes
- Country: United States
- Language: English
- Budget: $1,661,530
- Box office: $10,000,000

Stalag 17 is a 1953 American war comedy film directed and produced by Billy Wilder, from a screenplay by Edwin Blum and Wilder, based upon the Broadway play of the same name by Donald Bevan and Edmund Trzcinski, inspired by their experiences as prisoners in Stalag 17B in Austria. The film follows the story of a group of American airmen confined in a German prisoner-of-war camp. The film focuses on one particular barracks, where the men come to suspect that one of their number is an informant.

The film stars William Holden, for which he won an Academy Award for Best Actor in a Leading Role, along with Don Taylor, Robert Strauss, Harvey Lembeck, Peter Graves, Neville Brand, Richard Erdman, Sig Ruman, and Otto Preminger. Strauss and Lembeck appeared in the original Broadway production.

== Plot ==
Stalag 17 is a German prisoner-of-war camp "somewhere on the Danube" during World War II. One of its compounds holds 630 American airmen (all of whom are sergeants) and is overseen by camp warden Oberst von Scherbach. In December 1944, the men of Barracks 4 — led by appointed barracks chief "Hoffy" Hoffman and security officer Frank Price — arrange for the escape of fellow airmen Manfredi and Johnson. The pair are shot dead in the attempt, and the men believe they were betrayed by an informant. Suspicion falls on J. J. Sefton (Holden), an enterprising cynic who barters openly with the German guards for various luxuries. He also creates profitable ventures that distract from the mundanity of camp life: from organizing rat races for gambling, to an improvised distillery for brewing alcohol, to a makeshift telescope to spy on the Russian women from a neighboring compound. Clarence "Cookie" Cook, who narrates the story, serves as Sefton's naive and loyal aide.

The men of Barracks 4 do their best to manage the stress and boredom of imprisonment. This includes enduring the antics of barracks clowns "Animal" Kuzawa and Harry Shapiro, and listening for war news on a smuggled radio. Although their guard, Feldwebel Schulz, is jovial, he secretly retrieves hidden messages from a hollow chessboard piece (the black queen), and he straightens the looped cord of a dangling light bulb as a signal between himself and the informant. Just before Christmas, a recently captured Lieutenant Dunbar is assigned to Barracks 4 until he can be sent to an officers camp. Sgt. Bagradian, who accompanies Dunbar, reveals that Dunbar rigged a time bomb in transit and blew up a munitions train. Sefton recognizes Dunbar from officer's school. He believes Dunbar only passed because of his wealthy family, and this creates tension between them.

Schulz announces that an inspector from the Geneva Convention will arrive. Sefton bribes the guards to let him spend the day with the Russian women. The radio is later confiscated by Schulz. Concluding that Sefton was rewarded for revealing the radio, the men confront him when he returns, but Sefton denies he was responsible. Von Scherbach interrupts to arrest Dunbar as a saboteur; the men blame Sefton again, and they brutally beat him.

The next day, the inspector from Geneva arrives with Red Cross parcels—including 2,000 ping-pong balls, which the prisoners use to create smoke bombs. The inspector is told about Dunbar's removal. He warns von Scherbach that Dunbar cannot be convicted without proof lest there be war crime trials. Von Scherbach hands Schulz a black queen to be delivered to the informant. During the Christmas Eve celebrations, Price stealthily switches out the black queen, reads the hidden message, and resets the signal. Sefton, recovering from his beating, notices the signal afterwards and becomes suspicious. Price gets Bagradian to reveal the recipe of Dunbar's time bomb: a lit cigarette tucked into a matchbook. That night, an air raid siren forces the men to evacuate. Sefton hides and witnesses Price speaking German to Schulz, and demonstrating the time bomb as evidence against Dunbar.

On Christmas Day, the SS arrive to transport Dunbar to Berlin. While Hoffy has Price guard Sefton (who is still believed to be the informant), he gathers the men to rescue Dunbar. A riot and an ignited smoke bomb distract the guards, and Dunbar is taken to hide in a latrine's water tower until nightfall. After von Scherbach threatens to raze the camp, the men of Barracks 4 decide that one of them must help Dunbar escape. Price volunteers, and Sefton finally accuses him of being a German spy. Sefton interrogates Price and reveals the messaging system he used. The men are convinced. Price tries to flee, but he is quickly restrained and gagged.

Anticipating a generous reward, Sefton decides to rescue Dunbar and retrieves the Lieutenant. The prisoners throw Price out of the barracks with cans tied to his leg; the noise attracts the spotlights of every guard tower, and Price is gunned down. Sefton and Dunbar escape amidst the chaos. The prisoners return to their bunks, and Cookie whistles "When Johnny Comes Marching Home".

== Cast ==
- William Holden as J.J. Sefton
- Don Taylor as Lieutenant James Dunbar
- Otto Preminger as Colonel von Scherbach
- Robert Strauss as Stanislas "Animal" Kuzawa
- Harvey Lembeck as Harry Shapiro
- Richard Erdman as "Hoffy" Hoffman
- Peter Graves as Frank “Security” Price
- Neville Brand as Duke Musgrove
- Sig Ruman as Sergeant Johann Sebastian Schulz
- Gil Stratton as Clarence Harvey "Cookie" Cook (narrator)
- Robinson Stone as Joey
- Robert Shawley as "Blondie" Peterson
- William Pierson as Marko the Mailman
- Michael Moore as Manfredi
- Peter Baldwin as Johnson
- Jay Lawrence as Bagradian
- Erwin Kalser as Geneva Man
- Edmund Trzcinski as "Triz" Trzcinski
- Ross Bagdasarian as Singing Prisoner of War (uncredited)
- Paul Salata as Prisoner with Beard (uncredited)
- Joe Ploski as German Guard (uncredited)

== Production ==
=== Original Broadway production ===
The film was adapted by Wilder and Edwin Blum from the Broadway play by Donald Bevan and Edmund Trzcinski, which was based on their experiences as prisoners in Stalag 17B in Austria. Trzcinski appears in the film as a prisoner. The Sefton character was loosely based on Joe Palazzo, a flyer in Trzcinski's prisoner-of-war barracks.

The play was produced and directed by José Ferrer. It was first presented at the Edwin Burke Memorial Theater of The Lambs, a theatrical club, on March 11, 1951 (staged by the authors). It began its Broadway run on May 8, 1951, at the 48th Street Theatre and continued for 472 performances, closing on June 21, 1952. Among the notable actors in the cast, John Ericson made his Broadway debut as Sefton, as did Mark Roberts as Dunbar and Allan Melvin as Reed. Robert Strauss, Harvey Lembeck, and William Pierson performed the same roles in the play that they later portrayed in the film.

=== Casting ===
Both Charlton Heston and Kirk Douglas were considered for the role of Sefton.

=== Location ===
The prison camp set was built on the John Show Ranch in Woodland Hills, on the southwestern edge of the San Fernando Valley. The shoot began in February 1952, during the rainy season in California, providing plenty of mud for the camp compound. It is now the location of a meetinghouse of the Church of Jesus Christ of Latter-day Saints.

=== Filming and release ===
The film was shot in chronological order, an unusual practice which is usually much more expensive and time-consuming. In a featurette released later, cast members said they did not know the informant's identity until the last three days of shooting.

Peter Graves recalled that the film was held back from release for over a year because Paramount Pictures did not believe that anyone would be interested in seeing a film about prisoners of war. The 1953 release of American POWs from the Korean War led Paramount to release it on an exploitation angle.

== Reception ==
=== Box office ===
By January 1954, Stalag 17 had earned $3.3 million in theatrical rentals in the United States and Canada.

=== Critical reaction ===
Bosley Crowther praised the film, calling it "cracker-jack movie entertainment". He praised Wilder and Edwin Blum for having improved the play, and applauded William Holden's performance. Harrison's Reports wrote, "Thanks to the brilliant handling of the subject matter by producer-director Billy Wilder, and to the fine acting of the entire cast, the picture has been fashioned into a first-rate entertainment". William Brogdon of Variety felt "The raucous flavor will set well with male viewers and even the distaffers should find it acceptable entertainment most of the time. William Holden's name heads the good cast...although the lengthy two-hour running time makes for a booking awkwardness when it reaches the regular dual-bill situations in the general runs." Philip K. Scheuer of the Los Angeles Times wrote Wilder "preserved [the] essential humor and tragedy with no dulling of its corrosive edges, though he has cleaned it up in both language and situations. Lustiness has pretty much replaced bawdiness, and while the fun may not yet be all in the "good clean" class, it is at least expressed in the accepted and more palatable Hollywood medium of hard-boiled comedy."

In 2006, film critic James Berardinelli stated, "among the 20th-century directors, few were more versatile than Billy Wilder". On Rotten Tomatoes, the film has a 91% rating based on 74 reviews, with an average rating of 8.40/10. The website's consensus states: "Stalag 17 survives the jump from stage to screen with flying colors, thanks to Billy Wilder's typically sterling direction and a darkly funny script." On Metacritic it has a score of 84% based on reviews from 15 critics.

== Accolades ==
William Holden won the Academy Award for Best Actor in a Leading Role. His acceptance speech is one of the shortest on record ("thank you, thank you"); the TV broadcast had a strict cutoff time, which forced Holden's quick remarks. The frustrated Holden personally paid for advertisements in the Hollywood trade publications to thank everyone he wanted to on Oscar night. He also remarked that he felt that either Burt Lancaster or Montgomery Clift should have won the Best Actor Oscar for From Here to Eternity instead of him. He is said to have felt he was given the award as consolation for not having previously won it for Sunset Boulevard.

Award	Category	Nominee(s)	Result	Ref.
Academy Awards	Best Director	Billy Wilder	Nominated	
Academy Awards	Best Actor	William Holden	Won	
Academy Awards	Best Supporting Actor	Robert Strauss	Nominated	
Directors Guild of America Awards	Outstanding Directorial Achievement in Motion Pictures	Billy Wilder	Nominated	
National Board of Review Awards	Top Ten Films		7th Place	
New York Film Critics Circle Awards	Best Actor	William Holden	Nominated	
Writers Guild of America Awards	Best Written American Comedy	Billy Wilder and Edwin Blum	Nominated	

== In popular culture ==
- The television series Hogan's Heroes (CBS, 1965–71) is based on a similar Stalag. Richard Erdman, who played Hoffy in Stalag 17, guest-starred on Hogan's Heroes as Walter Hobson, a reporter, who with Hogan's crew, is freed in the episode "No Names Please". Erdman is the only star of the movie to have guest-starred on Hogan's Heroes.
- "Stalag 17" is a 1973 reggae riddim composed by Ansell Collins and named after the film.
- Jay Lawrence, who played amateur impressionist Sgt. Bagradian, reprised his Clark Gable impression when he played Gable as Rhett Butler in the 1975 pop musical Train Ride to Hollywood, starring the R&B band Bloodstone. He used the exact same line - "I gave you kisses for breakfast, kisses for lunch, and kisses for supper . . . and now I find that you're eating out" - in the Bloodstone movie.
- The film is parodied in the Ripping Yarns episode "Escape from Stalag Luft 112B" (1977).
- An uncredited William Holden reprised the character of a cigar-chewing POW in the 1979 war movie Escape to Athena. Since he is seen only briefly, "Sefton" presumably made another successful escape while no one was looking.
- The episode "Did You See The Sunrise?" (1982), of the television series Magnum, P.I., opens with Stalag 17 playing on the TV, as the main character, Thomas Magnum, is watching and remembering his childhood, and the enjoyment he had with the movie, only to grow up and experience his own wartime imprisonment.
- In a 1995, season-three NYPD Blue episode entitled "Torah! Torah! Torah!", Stalag 17 was mentioned.
- In the 2008–2015 television series The Penguins of Madagascar, two penguins named Manfredi and Johnson are referenced throughout the show, typically for the nature of their demise or a mistake they made. They actually appear alive in "The Penguin Who Loved Me".
- In the 2013 film, The Internship, Vince Vaughn makes a reference to being someone's “Bill Holden” to get him what he needs.
