= Overture to The Merry Wives of Windsor =

1953 film

- Directed by: Johnny Green
- Produced by: Johnny Green
- Starring: Johnny Green
- Cinematography: Robert H. Planck
- Edited by: John McSweeney Jr.
- Distributed by: MGM
- Release date: 1953
- Running time: 9 minutes
- Country: United States
- Language: English

Overture to The Merry Wives of Windsor (also known as The Merry Wives of Windsor Overture) is a 1953 American live-action short musical film directed and produced by Johnny Green. It won an Oscar in 1954 for Best Short Subject (One-Reel). The film consists of the MGM Symphony Orchestra playing the Overture to Otto Nicolai's opera The Merry Wives of Windsor, conducted by Johnny Green.

== Cast ==
- Johnny Green as Himself
