= John Ruddock =

British actor (1897–1981)

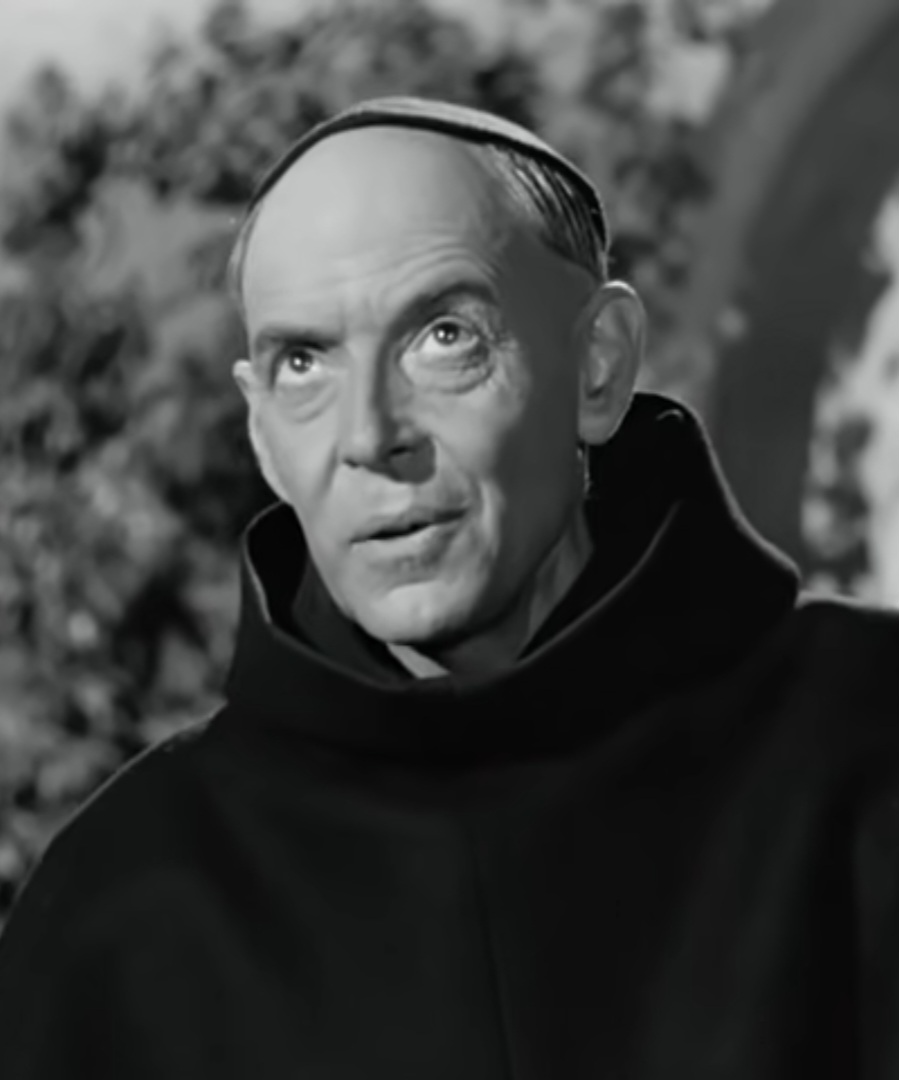
- John Ruddock in Martin Luther (1953)
- Born: John Reynolds Ruddock; 20 May 1897; Lima, Peru
- Died: 24 September 1981 (aged 84); Guildford, Surrey, England
- Occupation: Actor
- Years active: 1930s-1977
- Spouse: Avril Voules (1942-1965) Elizabeth Rudder (1966-1981) (his death)
- Children: 2

John Ruddock (20 May 1897 – 24 September 1981) was a Peruvian-born British film and television actor.

== Biography ==
John Ruddock was born on 20 May 1897 in Lima, Peru as John Reynolds Ruddock. He was the first of seven children of his British father and American mother. After the family returned to Britain, he was sent to school at St Lawrence College, Ramsgate from 1910 to 1914.

He worked briefly for an insurance company in Liverpool before volunteering to fight in the First World War. He was commissioned into the Royal Northumberland Fusiliers and saw action on the Somme and at Passchendaele. He was wounded several times and on one occasion was buried for fifteen hours as a result of an artillery bombardment. In the 1920s he attended the Royal College of Music and then the Royal Academy of Dramatic Art. He was in repertory in the 1930s and with the Shakespeare Memorial Theatre company at Stratford. During the Second World War he worked for the Entertainments National Service Association.

Further stage performances for the RSC after the war included John of Gaunt in Richard II and Shylock in The Merchant of Venice.

In the 1940s and 1950s he had some notable character roles in MGM period films. He also performed numerous roles for the BBC both on radio and television. These included appearances in A Christmas Carol, Dixon of Dock Green, The Avengers and finally in 1977 in the post-apocalyptic fiction series Survivors.

In his latter years he was a drama coach at the Guildford School of Acting. He died in 1981 in Guildford.

== Selected filmography ==
- Escape to Danger (1943) as Jim
- The Way Ahead (1944) as Chelsea Pensioner
- Strawberry Roan (1944) as John Dibben
- Waltz Time (1945) as Count Prohaska
- Pink String and Sealing Wax (1945) as Judge
- Lisbon Story (1946) as Pierre Sargon
- Night Boat to Dublin (1946) as Bowman
- Wanted for Murder (1946) as Glover
- The Laughing Lady (1946) as Gilliatt
- Meet Me at Dawn (1947) as Doctor
- Frieda (1947) as Granger
- The Fallen Idol (1948) as Dr. Wilson
- Under Capricorn (1949) as Mr. Potter
- Quo Vadis (1951) as Chilo
- Secret People (1952) as Daly
- Ivanhoe (1952) as Hundebert
- Martin Luther (1953) as Vicar von Staupitz
- Women Without Men (1956) as 3rd Policeman (uncredited)
- Lust for Life (1956) as Ducrucq
- Treasure at the mill (1957) as Mr. Wilson
- Question 7 (1961) as Martin Kraus, Küster
- The Avengers, Mr Teddy Bear (1962) as Dr James Howell
- Lawrence of Arabia (1962) as Elder Harith (uncredited)
- Chitty Chitty Bang Bang (1968) as Minister of Finance (uncredited)
- The Horsemen (1971) as Scribe
- Elizabeth R (1971, TV Series) as Archbishop Whitgift
- Survivors (1977, TV Series) as Bagley
