= National Board of Review Awards 1953 =

Annual US film awards ceremony

25th National Board of Review Awards

Late December, 1953

The 25th National Board of Review Awards were announced in late December, 1953.

== Top Ten Films ==
1. Julius Caesar
2. Shane
3. From Here to Eternity
4. Martin Luther
5. Lili
6. Roman Holiday
7. Stalag 17
8. The Little Fugitive
9. Mogambo
10. The Robe

== Top Foreign Films ==
1. A Queen is Crowned
2. Moulin Rouge
3. The Little World of Don Camillo
4. Strange Deception
5. The Conquest of Everest

== Winners ==
- Best Film: Julius Caesar
- Best Foreign Film: A Queen is Crowned
- Best Actor: James Mason (Face to Face, The Desert Rats, The Man Between, Julius Caesar)
- Best Actress: Jean Simmons (Young Bess, The Robe, The Actress)
- Best Director: George Stevens (Shane)
