= Arthur Knight (film critic) =

American film critic and historian (1916–1991)

- Born: Arthur Rosenheimer; September 3, 1916; Philadelphia, Pennsylvania, U.S.
- Died: July 25, 1991 (aged 74); Sydney, Australia
- Occupations: Film critic; film historian; television host
- Spouse(s): Mary Ann Nyberg (?–?; divorced)

Arthur Knight (1916–1991) was an American film critic, film historian, professor, and television host.

His book The Liveliest Art, first published in 1957, is a history of the cinema used as a textbook at colleges and universities throughout the world.

== Early life ==
He graduated from City College of New York in 1940, and became an assistant film curator at the Museum of Modern Art. He served in the Army from 1941 to 1945, becoming a first lieutenant.

== Film teacher ==
Institutions at which he taught include:

- Brooklyn Academy of Music
- City College of New York Institute of Film Techniques
- New School for Social Research
- Hunter College
- Columbia University
- UCLA
- University of Southern California
- Australian Film Television and Radio School

His former students at USC include George Lucas, Robert Zemeckis, John Carpenter and Randal Kleiser. His former film history students at the City College of New York Institute of Film Techniques include Donald Swerdlow (now Don Canaan), an award-winning journalist and film editor, Producer Michael Hertzberg, DGA-First AD - Frank Capra Award Recipient Alex Hapsas, Writer-Director David Saperstein (Cocoon).

Mehdi Tehrani (Lecturer of film studies at the University of Tehran College of Fine Arts and film critic) was one of his last students in 1990.

== Movie critic ==
He reviewed movies for many publications, principally:

- The Saturday Review (1949–1973)
- The Hollywood Reporter (1973–1986)

In December 1972, Knight served as a defense witness in the Deep Throat obscenity trial, arguing that the film was, "more professional, more cleverly and amusingly written" than other films, and "not a sleazy film by any means. Knight would later testify in the 1976 trial of adult film actor Harry Reems, who was accused of conspiracy to distribute obscenity across state lines.

== Host and producer ==
He wrote, produced and hosted the 1985 cable TV series Sex in Cinema for the Playboy Channel, based on the annual column he wrote for Playboy Magazine. He was also the host of the syndicated radio series Knight at the Movies. In 1974, he was a member of the jury at the 24th Berlin International Film Festival.

== Personal life ==
His first wife was costume designer Mary Ann Nyberg, who died in 1979. He was survived by his wife, Anne.
