= Walton and O'Rourke =

Walton and O'Rourke (Paul E. Walton and Michael O'Rourke) were a famous team of cabaret puppeteers who founded the Olvera Street Puppet Theatre in Hollywood in 1935.

Within the puppeteering community Walton and O'Rourke were considered one of the finest teams of puppet showmen the U.S. ever produced. Some of their marionettes used as many as seven strings to control a single marionette arm.

Walton and O'Rourke appeared on Broadway in the 1941 Olsen and Johnson review Sons o' Fun.

A brief filmed record of their work can be seen in the 1936 Walter Lantz Oswald the Lucky Rabbit cartoon, "Puppet Show". The first and last sections present a live-action marionette show, where some very subtle character movements are demonstrated. For the 1953 motion picture Lili, they performed using hand puppets rather than the marionettes for which they were most famous. Walton & O'Rourke made the puppets; George Latshaw manipulated Carrot Top; Wolo Von Trutzschler manipulated Golo the Giant; and Walton and O'Rourke manipulated Margurite and Reynardo.
