= Edwin Blum =

American screenwriter

- Born: Edwin Harvey Blum; August 2, 1906; Atlantic City, New Jersey, U.S.
- Died: May 2, 1995 (aged 88); Santa Monica, California, U.S.
- Occupation: Screenwriter

Edwin Harvey Blum (August 2, 1906 – May 2, 1995) was an American screenwriter.

== Early life ==
Edwin Blum was born in Atlantic City, New Jersey on August 2, 1906, to Samuel Blum and Fannie Cohen. His father was involved with many professions over the years, including being a real estate broker and candy store proprietor, and his business took him all over the country. Edwin grew up in Philadelphia, Denver, New York City, and San Francisco. Edwin appeared to be poised to take over the family candy store business when he moved to Los Angeles in 1933 at the age of 27 and began screenwriting for Hollywood.

== Career ==
His first work that was used for a movie was The New Adventures of Tarzan, and the 12 episode serial was released in 1935. He attempted to write for the stage, but his attempts in 1936 and 1938 failed, so he began to produce additional movie scripts. By 1938, he began to see a steady stream of movies he had written that were released.

In 1944, he wrote a movie adaptation for The Canterville Ghost. This film received a number of accolades and is considered for the list of the American Film Institute's top 10 fantasy films by the American Film Institute. The film also won a Retro Hugo Award for Best Dramatic Presentation (Short Form). Perhaps his most memorable movie was in 1953, when he wrote Stalag 17 for the big screen. Stalag 17 was nominated for 3 Academy Awards and won in the Best Actor category. Years later in 1965, a television show called Hogan's Heroes would be released, that seemed to use many of the elements of this movie.

By the end of the 1950s, he had turned his hand towards television episodes and wrote occasionally for Hollywood, but began to get involved in politics. Writing for Democratic party candidates, he proved to be a more than capable script writer, and was believed to be credited with creating the nickname "Tricky Dick" for then California senatorial candidate Richard Nixon. He continued writing for television and speech writing for candidates until 1977 when he retired. He had one more film left in him, as he wrote the story for the movie Gung Ho. The movie was released in 1986 and was a mixed success. However, it did spawn a brief television series that ran for nine episodes. The scripts he wrote for this television series were his last contributions to Hollywood.

Edwin died in Santa Monica, California on May 2, 1995.
