= Donald Bevan =

American WWII POW and playwright (1920–2013)

Donald Joseph Bevan (January 16, 1920 – May 29, 2013) was an American playwright whose works include the Broadway play Stalag 17, co-written with Edmund Trzcinski, and adapted as a movie in 1953. He was also the caricaturist for the celebrity wall at Sardi's restaurant in New York City for over 20 years, the third of four such artists employed by Sardi's.

Bevan was born in Holyoke, Massachusetts. A United States Army Air Forces veteran who served in World War II as a gunner of a Boeing B-17 Flying Fortress and as a prisoner of war in Germany after being shot down April 17, 1943, Bevan died in Studio City, California, and is buried at Riverside National Cemetery in Riverside, California.

== See also ==
- List of caricatures at Sardi's restaurant
