= The Word (1953 film) =

1953 film

- Produced by: John Adams; John Healy
- Distributed by: Twentieth Century-Fox Film Corporation
- Release date: 1953
- Country: United States
- Language: English

The Word is a 1953 American short documentary film produced by John Adams. The film is about Frank Laubach and his work on literacy. The Word was nominated for an Academy Award for Best Documentary Short.
