= Edmund Trzcinski =

American WWII POW and playwright (1921–1996)

Edmund Trzcinski (2 January 1921 – 3 June 1996) was an American playwright, best known for the play Stalag 17.

== Biography ==
He was born in the Bronx, New York City, New York. An enlisted member of the 8th Air Force, his airplane was shot down over Germany and he was sent to Luft Stalag 17B.

His most notable work is the Broadway play Stalag 17, adapted into a movie in 1953, which he co-wrote with Donald Bevan, a fellow POW in Germany. He also had a brief role in the film as the POW whose wife claims to have found a baby on her doorstep which looks just like her. He repeatedly says, "I believe it," in an attempt to convince himself that his wife hasn't been unfaithful.

He died in Manhattan in 1996, aged 75.

== Filmography ==
Year	Title	Role	Notes
1953	Stalag 17	'Triz' Trzcinski	
