= To All My Friends on Shore =

- Genre: Drama
- Directed by: Gilbert Cates
- Starring: Bill Cosby
- Country of origin: United States
- Original language: English

Production
- Producer: Bill Cosby
- Running time: 71 minutes

Original release
- Release: February 25, 1972

To All My Friends On Shore is a 1972 television film drama starring Bill Cosby, and co-starring Gloria Foster. Cosby not only starred in the film, but produced it and worked on the film's music. Writer Allan Sloane won an Emmy for the screenplay .

== Plot ==
Blue works as a skycap for an airport. At the same time he works a second job as a junk scavenger. His wife Serena works as a maid and is going to school trying to become a nurse. Blue is busy working trying to save money to buy his family a house so they can leave the projects. His young son, Vandy, resents him because he won't let him have any fun like his friends. It is eventually discovered that Vandy has sickle cell anemia. It is then that Blue realizes what he should spend his time on - being with his family.

== Cast ==
- Bill Cosby as Blue
- Gloria Foster as Serena Blue
- Dennis Hines as Evander "Vandy" Blue Jr.
- Dennis Tate as Dr. Folkman
