= Lili (1953 film) =

1953 film by Charles Walters

- Directed by: Charles Walters
- Screenplay by: Helen Deutsch
- Based on: The Man Who Hated People; 1950 in The Saturday Evening Post by Paul Gallico
- Produced by: Edwin H. Knopf
- Starring: Leslie Caron; Mel Ferrer; Jean-Pierre Aumont; Zsa Zsa Gabor; Kurt Kasznar
- Cinematography: Robert H. Planck
- Edited by: Ferris Webster
- Music by: Bronisław Kaper; Gerald Fried (uncredited)
- Production company: Metro-Goldwyn-Mayer
- Distributed by: Loew's, Inc.
- Release date: March 10, 1953
- Running time: 81 minutes
- Language: English
- Budget: $1,353,000
- Box office: $5,393,000

Lili is a 1953 American romantic musical film directed by Charles Walters for Metro-Goldwyn-Mayer (MGM). Adapted from Paul Gallico's 1950 short story "The Man Who Hated People", (Note: The screen credits refer only to "a story by Paul Gallico"; Contemporary Authors Online, Thomson Gale, 2005 specifically says that it was adapted from "The Man Who Hated People". After the film's success, Gallico expanded his story into a 1954 novella entitled Love of Seven Dolls.) the film stars Leslie Caron as a touchingly naïve French girl whose emotional relationship with a carnival puppeteer is conducted through the medium of four puppets.

Lili received six nominations from the Academy Awards, including Caron for Best Actress. Bronisław Kaper won the Academy Award for Best Music Score of a Dramatic or Comedy Picture. The film was also entered in the 1953 Cannes Film Festival. Lili was later adapted into a stage musical titled Carnival! (1961).

== Plot ==
Naive country girl Lili arrives in a provincial town in hopes of locating an old friend of her late father, only to find that he has died. A local shopkeeper offers her employment, then tries to take advantage of her. She is rescued by a handsome, smooth-talking, womanizing carnival magician, Marc, whose stage name is Marcus the Magnificent. Lili is infatuated with him and follows him to the carnival, where on learning that she is 16, he helps her get a job as waitress. Lili is fired on her first night when she spends her time watching the magic act instead of waiting tables. When Lili consults the magician for advice, he tells her to go back to where she came from. Homeless and heartbroken, she contemplates suicide, unaware that she is being watched by the carnival's puppeteer Paul. He strikes up a conversation with her through his puppets—a brash red-haired boy named Carrot Top, a sly fox, Reynardo, a vain ballerina, Marguerite, and a cowardly giant, Golo. Soon, a large group of carnival workers is enthralled watching Lili's interaction with the puppets, as she is seemingly unaware that there is a puppeteer behind the curtain. Afterwards, Paul and his partner Jacquot offer Lili a job in the act, talking with the puppets. She accepts, and her natural manner of interacting with the puppets becomes the most valuable part of the act.

Paul was once a well-known dancer, but suffered a leg injury in World War II. He regards the puppet show as far inferior to his old career, which embitters him. Lili refers to him as "the Angry Man". Although he falls in love with Lili, he can only express his feelings through the puppets. Fearing rejection due to his physical impairment, he keeps his distance by being unpleasant to her. Lili continues to dream about the handsome magician, wishing to replace his assistant Rosalie.

Soon, Marcus receives an offer to perform at the local casino and decides to leave the carnival, to the joy of Rosalie, who announces to everyone that she is his wife. Lili is heartbroken and innocently invites Marc to her trailer. His lecherous plans are interrupted by Paul, and he leaves. When Lili finds Marc's wedding ring in the seat cushions and tries to chase him, Paul stops her, calls her a fool, and slaps her.

Two impresarios from Paris who have been scouting the show come to see Paul and Jacquot. They recognize Paul as the former dancer and tell him that his act with Lili and the puppets is ingenious. Paul is ecstatic about this and the offer, but Jacquot tells the agents that they will have to let them know. He then tells Paul that Lili is leaving.

Lili takes the wedding ring to Marc and tells him that every little girl has to wake up from her girlish dreams. She has decided to leave the carnival. On her way out, she is stopped by the voices of Carrot Top and Reynardo, who ask her to take them with her. As they embrace her, she finds they are shaking. She remembers somebody is behind the curtain and pulls it away to see Paul. Instead of telling her how he feels, he tells her of the agents' offer. She confronts him about the difference between his real self, seemingly incapable of love, and his puppets. Paul tells her he is the puppets, a creature of many facets and many flaws. He concludes by telling her, "This is business." "Not any more," retorts Lili, who walks away.

Walking out of town, she imagines that the puppets, now life-sized, have joined her. As she dances with each puppet in turn, they all turn into Paul. Coming back to reality, Lili runs back to the carnival and into Paul's arms. They kiss passionately as the puppets applaud.

== Cast ==
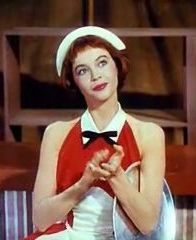
Leslie Caron as Lili

- Leslie Caron – Lili Daurier
- Mel Ferrer – Paul Berthalet
- Jean-Pierre Aumont – Marc
- Zsa Zsa Gabor – Rosalie
- Kurt Kasznar – Jacquot
- Amanda Blake – Peach Lips
- Alex Gerry – Proprietor
- Ralph Dumke – Mr. Corvier
- Wilton Graff – Mr. Tonit
- George Baxter – Mr. Enrique

== Production ==
=== Development ===
Lili was adapted from Paul Gallico's short story "The Man Who Hated People", which appeared in the October 28, 1950 issue of The Saturday Evening Post. Screenwriter Helen Deutsch adapted the story into a script.

According to Leslie Caron, the film was developed with Italian actress Pier Angeli in mind. At the time, Caron had made her theatrical screen debut in An American in Paris (1951). She previously was a dancer performing in Roland Petit's ballet company "Ballet des Champs Elysées" in Paris where she was discovered by Gene Kelly, who selected her as his co-star. Impressed with her screen test, MGM signed Caron to a long-term contract. When An American in Paris was released in 1951, the film was a box office success and the performances of Kelly and Caron were praised. Deutsch decided to cast Caron after she watched a private screening of An American in Paris.

Because of his success with An American in Paris, Vincente Minnelli was offered to direct Lili but he declined as it was another film set in Paris and featured ballet sequences. In the spring of 1952, Deutsch arrived at Charles Walters's Malibu beach house with the script in hand. While he was not completely sold on the script, Walters considered Deutsch's script refreshingly mature and told her it would make for an interesting picture if they chose a less grandiose approach.

=== Filming ===
Principal photography on Lili began on March 10, 1952. For the visual style, Walters wanted a muted, less saturated look separate from the Technicolor musicals, to evoke the post-war British films he had seen.

Burr Tillstrom was approached to create puppets for the film, but turned it down. Walton and O'Rourke designed the puppets seen in the film. They had previously worked in cabarets and did not appear on television. Lili is among the few known filmed records of their work which also includes the Walter Lantz cartoon and live action short film, Oswald the Lucky Rabbit: Puppet Show (1936).

Lili finished filming in April 1952.

=== Post-production ===
An unfinished cut of Lili was screened before Deutsch, the film's producer Edwin H. Knopf, lyricist Howard Dietz, William Rodgers of Loew's Inc., and several MGM studio executives including Dore Schary and Joseph Vogel. Walters was not present at the screening as he was enjoying a ten-day vacation while preparing his next film, Dangerous When Wet (1953). He was told by his friend Keenan Wynn that the film was met with a silent response.

Meanwhile, Harry Brandt, president of the Independent Theater Owners Association (ITOA), was searching for a film to screen at the Trans-Lux Theatre in New York. Brandt was shown the rough cut and loved it. Relieved, Schary accepted Brandt's terms and finished Lili for a sneak preview.

== Music ==
The score was composed by Bronisław Kaper and conducted by Hans Sommer, with orchestrations by Robert Franklyn and Skip Martin. Kaper's music received the Oscar for "Best Music, Scoring of a Dramatic or Comedy Picture".

Lyrics for the song "Hi-Lili, Hi-Lo" were written by Helen Deutsch for her previously published short story "Song of Love". Kaper's setting of the song was performed by Caron and Mel Ferrer in the film; the performance was released on record, reaching number 30 on the American charts.

Four excerpts from the score were first issued by MGM Records at the time of the film's release. The complete score was issued on CD in 2005 on Film Score Monthly records.

== Release ==
On March 10, 1953, Lili premiered at the Trans-Lux 52nd Street Theatre in Manhattan as a benefit performance for the North Shore Hospital. During its opening weekend, the film earned $17,200—then a record gross for the theatre. MGM held its own Hollywood premiere on March 17 at the Vogue Theater, but further theatrical exhibition was prohibited due to the agreement with Brandt. Lili remained at the Trans-Lux for the next ten months until it left on December 22, 1953.

Lili was entered into the 1953 Cannes Film Festival, where it received a standing ovation. Gene Moskowitz for Variety wrote the film "was nicely received here as a change of pace after the grim mayhem, brutality and oppressiveness of many of the preceding [pictures]." Although it lost the Grand Prix to The Wages of Fear (1953), the film won the International Prize for the Most Entertaining Picture, with Special Mention for the Charm of the Interpretation.

By June 1953, MGM released the film in several U.S. cities, including Philadelphia, Boston, Pittsburgh, Kansas City, Missouri, Seattle, Portland, and Washington, D.C.

== Reception ==
=== Box office ===
According to MGM records, Lili earned $2,210,000 in the U.S. and Canada and $3,183,000 overseas, resulting in a profit of $1,878,000, making it MGM's most popular musical of the year.

=== Critical reaction ===
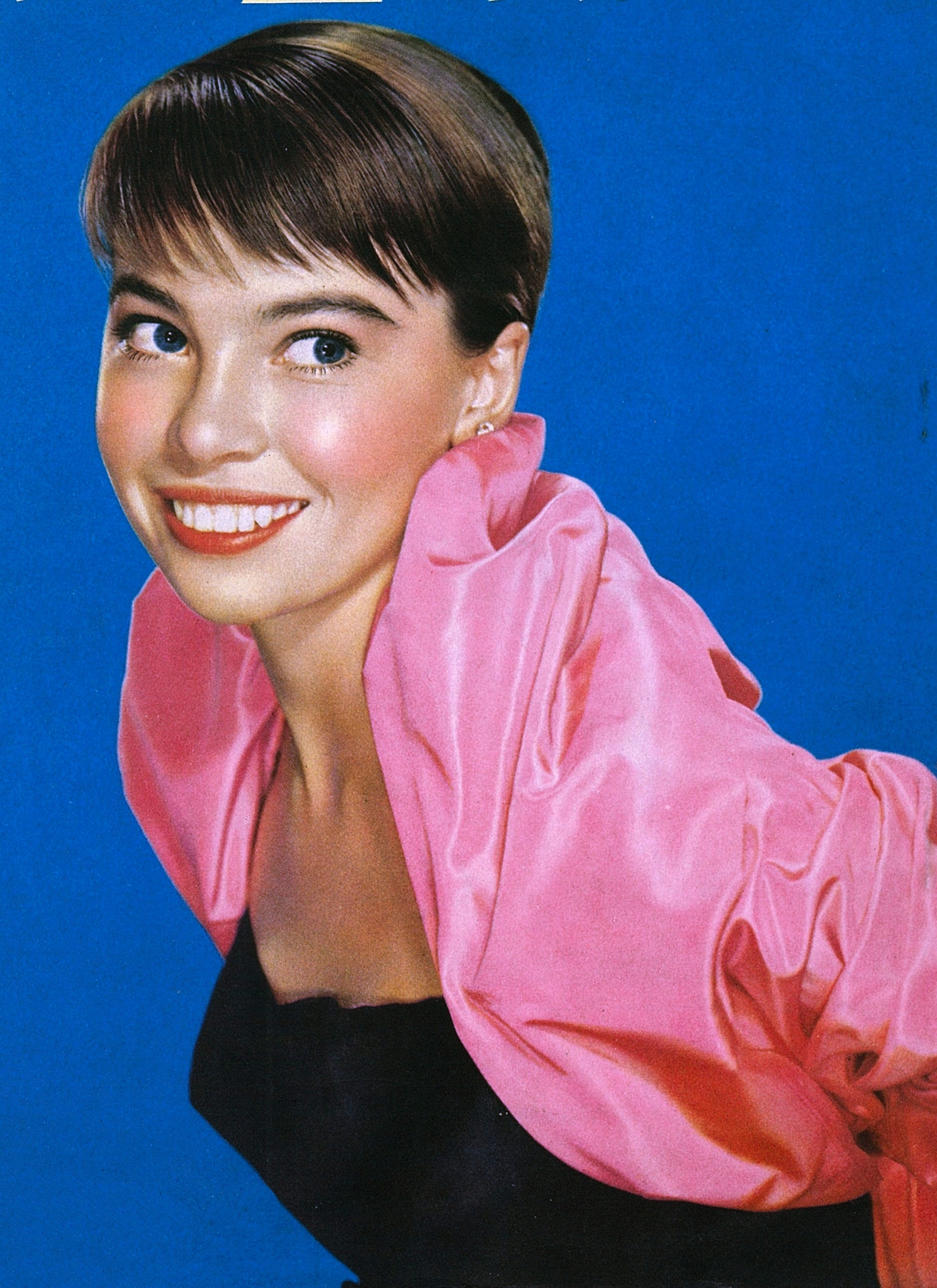
Leslie Caron (pictured here, in 1953) was praised for her performance as Lili. She was nominated for an Academy Award for Best Actress.

Bosley Crowther of The New York Times praised Lili as "a lovely and beguiling little film, touched with the magic of romance and the shimmer of masquerade." William Brogdon of Variety praised the film for its "sentiment, done with an air of charm" and Caron's performance, stating she has an "ingratiating approach that wins sympathy and warm chuckles." Edwin Schallert of the Los Angeles Times also praised Caron's performance and wrote: "There is a warm, human quality to the work she does in this romance of a carnival, so effectively directed by Charles Walters and produced by Edwin H. Knopf in Technicolor for MGM." Harrison's Reports called the film an "enchanting, heart-warming picture".

John McCarten of The New Yorker praised Caron's performance, but felt Ferrer's character "seem to be more suited to one of those damp-basement Russian affairs than to a nervous little fantasy, but even so he is something of a relief among all the lovable types who populate the film." Time magazine wrote, " Directed with a deft touch by Charles Walters, Lili is a triumph of lighthearted manner over lightweight subject matter. In telling of Lili's loves for the magician and the puppeteer it is also genuinely touching. Director Walters, a veteran choreographer himself, has given the picture visual bounce and a blithe sense of improvisation."

In her 1982 book 5001 Nights at the Movies, Pauline Kael called Lili a "sickly musical whimsy" and referred to Mel Ferrer's "narcissistic, masochistic smiles." Geoff Andrew of Time Out wrote: "Perhaps too deliberately charming for its own good, but this adaptation of a Paul Gallico novel about a 16-year-old waif who falls unhappily in love with a carnival magician, thus adding to the bitterness of the crippled puppeteer who loves her from afar, is actually rather delightful, thanks to Caron's touching performance and Walters' delicately stylish direction. The New York Times included it in its 2004 Guide to the Best 1,000 Movies Ever Made, as did Angie Errigo and Jo Berry in a 2005 compilation of Chick Flicks: Movies Women Love.

On the review aggregator website Rotten Tomatoes, 75% of 8 critics' reviews are positive. Metacritic, which uses a weighted average, assigned the film a score of 65 out of 100, based on 5 critics, indicating "generally favorable" reviews.

The film is recognized by American Film Institute in these lists:

- 2004: AFI's 100 Years...100 Songs:
  - "Hi-Lili, Hi-Lo"—Nominated

=== Accolades ===
Award	Category	Nominee(s)	Result	Ref.
Academy Awards	Best Director	Charles Walters	Nominated	
Academy Awards	Best Actress	Leslie Caron	Nominated	
Academy Awards	Best Screenplay	Helen Deutsch	Nominated	
Academy Awards	Best Art Direction – Color	Art Direction: Cedric Gibbons and Paul Groesse; Set Decoration: Edwin B. Willis and Arthur Krams	Nominated	
Academy Awards	Best Cinematography – Color	Robert Planck	Nominated	
Academy Awards	Best Music Score of a Dramatic or Comedy Picture	Bronisław Kaper	Won	
British Academy Film Awards	Best Film from any Source		Nominated	
British Academy Film Awards	Best Foreign Actress	Leslie Caron	Won	
Cannes Film Festival	Grand Prix	Charles Walters	Nominated	
Cannes Film Festival	International Award – Entertainment Film	Charles Walters	Won	
Cannes Film Festival	Special Mention	For the charming acting	Won	
Directors Guild of America Awards	Outstanding Directorial Achievement in Motion Pictures	Charles Walters	Nominated	
Golden Globe Awards	Best Screenplay	Helen Deutsch	Won	
National Board of Review Awards	Top Ten Films		5th Place	
Writers Guild of America Awards	Best Written American Musical	Helen Deutsch	Won	

== Musical adaptation ==
In 1961, Lili was adapted into a Broadway musical titled Carnival!. It starred Anna Maria Alberghetti and Jerry Orbach, with direction and choreography by Gower Champion and music and lyrics by Bob Merrill. Arthur Freed immediately acquired the film rights and hired Champion and screenwriter Julius Epstein to direct and write the film adaptation, respectively. However, Robert Weitman, then-head of production for MGM, informed Freed by telephone that Carnival! would have to be shelved.

== Bibliography ==
- Caron, Leslie (2009). Thank Heaven: A Memoir. New York: Penguin. ISBN 978-1-101-15244-7.
- Fordin, Hugh (1996) [1975]. M-G-M's Greatest Musicals: The Arthur Freed Unit. New York: Da Capo Press. ISBN 978-0-306-80730-5.
- Harvey, Stephen (1989). Directed by Vincente Minnelli. New York: Museum of Modern Art; Harper & Row. ISBN 978-0-87070-474-1.
- Schary, Dore (1979). Heyday: An Autobiography. Boston: Little, Brown and Company. ISBN 0-316-77270-4.
- Phillips, Brent (2014). Charles Walters: The Director Who Made Hollywood Dance. University Press of Kentucky. ISBN 978-0-8131-4723-9.
