= Allan Sloane =

American screenwriter (1914–2001)

- Born: June 14, 1914
- Died: April 29, 2001 (aged 86)
- Citizenship: United States of America
- Occupation: Writer
- Years active: 1954–2001
- Notable work: Breaking Point (1963 TV series); Crossroads (1955 TV series); Navy Log
- Awards: Emmy

Allan Everett Sloane (June 14, 1914 – April 29, 2001) was an Emmy and Peabody Award winning American writer for radio and television who, over much of his career, explored the circumstances of people with special needs. He was significantly affected by the Hollywood blacklist.

== Early life ==
He was born to Benjamin and Rachel Wisansky Silverman in New York City and grew up in New Jersey. After completing college in 1936, he became a newspaper journalist, writing for the Cape Cod Colonial, Parade, and the Philadelphia Bulletin.

Prior to serving in the United States Army during World War II, Sloane began writing scripts for radio, including service-action shows like The Man Behind the Gun (for which he dramatized the Allied landing on Sicily the day after the invasion, winning a 1943 Peabody Award), Top Secret, and Indictment. Sloane also wrote scripts for United Nations Radio, World Health Assembly, and the United Jewish Appeal after the war, focusing on displaced persons in Europe. He and his wife wrote "The Yamina Solyska Story", to document Nazi kidnapping of Polish children who were transfused with "Nordic" blood and fostered by Germans.

== Blacklisted ==
Sloane was among the 151 entertainment and journalism professionals who the right-wing booklet Red Channels implied were supporting Communist causes; he was blacklisted by CBS in November 1952, which effectively denied him any further radio script-work. Sloane appeared as a voluntary "friendly witness" for the House Un-American Activities Committee on January 13, 1954. For several decades thereafter, he used the pseudonym Ellison Carroll to avoid blacklist-related publicity.

His early radio work with actor/director Irving Pichel led to work (initially as a researcher, then as a writer) for the 1953 film Martin Luther, for which he shared a nomination for the 1954 Writers' Guild Best American Drama with writer/director Lothar Wolff.

== Television writer ==
He began writing episodes for television series in 1954–55, among them Crossroads and Navy Log. He is credited with creating the 1966 series Hawk, which featured Burt Reynolds as the title character, as well as guest appearances by Gene Hackman, Robert Duvall, and Diane Baker.

During the 1960s, he was well-enough considered to be asked to write the TV adaptation of Johnny Belinda, as well as scripts for TV theatre. Much of Sloane's later writing was long-form shows (1+ hours) dealing with the situations of special individuals, including autism (And James Was A Very Small Snail), Down syndrome (This Is My Son, and Emily, Emily), displaced persons (Eleven Memory Street), gifted children (Sit Down and Shut Up, or Get Out), and sickle cell anemia (To All My Friends On Shore).

== Recognition ==
Under his pseudonym Ellison Carroll, he was nominated for an Emmy for his 1963 Breaking Point screenplay And James Was A Very Small Snail; and again in 1969 for the Hallmark Hall of Fame (episode 81) Teacher, Teacher. In 1972, he won the Emmy for Outstanding Writing Achievement in Drama (Original Teleplay) with To All My Friends on Shore.

His papers are held in the Hargrett Library at the University of Georgia. Recordings of a number of his radio shows, and some lectures are maintained in the Walter J. Brown Media Archives and Peabody Collection, also at the University of Georgia.

== Personal life ==
After World War II, Sloane lived on Long Island and commuted to New York City, although he shared a small apartment in Manhattan with fellow-writer Alvin Boretz). He soon moved his family to New Canaan, Connecticut, where he lived for much of his professional life. He and his wife Elouise had three sons, one of whom was autistic.
