= Martin Luther (1953 film) =

1953 film biography directed by Irving Pichel

- Theatrical release poster
- Directed by: Irving Pichel
- Written by: Allan Sloane; Lothar Wolff
- Produced by: Lothar Wolff
- Starring: Niall MacGinnis
- Cinematography: Joseph C. Brun
- Edited by: Fritz Stapenhorst
- Music by: Mark Lothar
- Production companies: RD-DR Corporation; Lutheran Church Productions; Luther-Film-G.M.B.H.
- Distributed by: Louis de Rochemont Associates
- Release dates: 4 May 1953 (Milwaukee); 4 March 1954 (West Germany)
- Running time: 105 minutes
- Countries: United States; West Germany
- Language: English
- Budget: $350,000—$500,000
- Box office: $3 million

Martin Luther is a 1953 biographical film of Martin Luther was directed by Irving Pichel, who also played a supporting role, with Niall MacGinnis as Luther. It was produced by Louis de Rochemont and RD-DR Corporation in collaboration with the American company Lutheran Church Productions and the West German Luther-Film-G.M.B.H.

A notice at the beginning of the film describes it as a careful and balanced presentation of Luther's story: "This dramatization of a decisive moment in human history is the result of careful research of facts and conditions in the 16th century as reported by historians of many faiths." The research was done by Reformation scholars Theodore G. Tappert and Jaroslav Pelikan, who assisted Allan Sloane and Lothar Wolff.

The National Board of Review named the film the fourth best of 1953. It was nominated for two Oscars, for Best Cinematography (Black-and-White) (Joseph C. Brun) and Art Direction/Set Decoration (Black-and-White) (Fritz Maurischat, Paul Markwitz). The music was composed by Mark Lothar and performed by the Munich Philharmonic Orchestra. It was filmed at the Wiesbaden Studios in Hesse, West Germany.

The film was commercially very successful.

== Summary ==
DVD cover

The time frame of the film is 1505–1530: Luther's entrance into St. Augustine's Monastery in Erfurt to the presentation of the Augsburg Confession. It recounts Martin Luther's struggle to find God's mercy: his discovery of the gospel in Romans 1:17, the posting of the Ninety-five Theses in 1517, and the subsequent controversy with the Roman Catholic Church, which led to Luther's excommunication in a 1520 papal bull. The film shows Luther's resistance to the forces of radicalism, and his work to establish and maintain the evangelical movement of his day. The dramatic climax of the film is Luther's "Here I Stand" speech before Emperor Charles V at the 1521 Diet of Worms, and the grand finale is the singing of "A Mighty Fortress Is Our God" by Luther's congregation.

== Plot ==
During the life of Martin Luther power is divided between the Holy Roman Empire and the Roman Catholic Church. The narrator states: "the church had largely forgotten the mercies of God and, instead, it emphasized God's implacable judgments."

Before entering St. Augustine's Monastery, Martin Luther holds a party with his fellow law students. George Spalatin inquires into Luther's motivation for leaving law. Monastic life does not provide Luther spiritual peace despite his extreme ascetic piety. He is in terror at his first Mass as a priest. He confesses to his mentor, Vicar General Johann von Staupitz his unease. The prior proposes expelling Luther for his restless mind, but Staupitz believes study and a pilgrimage to Rome will help.

Returning from Rome, Luther opines that the common people could more easily find God merciful if the Holy Scriptures were in their vernacular. He is scolded by his prior. Luther meets George Spalatin, who has also left law for the church: in his case to serve Frederick III, Elector of Saxony. Spalatin asks if Luther has found what he was looking for. Luther responds, "Not yet." Spalatin recommends Luther to the Elector as professor of Biblical studies at the University of Wittenberg. Luther baptizes an infant in the castle church.

Luther receives his Doctorate of Theology but has difficulty accepting the practice of collecting and showcasing relics. Luther has undergone his "reformatory discovery" through his study of the Epistle to the Romans. He tells Staupitz that one only need have faith in Jesus Christ for salvation. Staupitz is unpersuaded.

In 1517 Pope Leo X arranges with Archbishop Albert a jubilee indulgence in Germany with Johann Tetzel as the main preacher. Luther comes across a parishioner convinced that he need no longer go to confession because he has bought one of Tetzel's indulgences. Luther preaches against the abuse of indulgences: "Beloved, you cannot buy God's mercy." He posts his The Ninety-five Theses on the church door, they are copied, translated, and printed for all of Germany. Sales of Tetzel's indulgences fall off, moving Archbishop Albert of Mainz to send Luther's theses to the pope.

In 1519 Andreas Karlstadt tells Luther and professor Philipp Melanchthon he has been invited to Leipzig to debate "our theses." Luther invites himself and Melanchthon along. In Leipzig they see a movement to link Luther with Jan Hus to brand him a heretic. Johann Eck shouts, "Heresy, Dr. Luther, Heresy!" with Luther responding, "So be it! It is still the truth!" Staupitz releases Luther from his vows.

The pope is furious with Luther's publications of 1520 (To the Christian Nobility of the German Nation, On the Babylonian Captivity of the Church, and On the Freedom of a Christian), and threatens Luther with excommunication. It too is disseminated, but Luther responds by burning it on the deadline demanded for his retraction. Cardinal Aleander demands Elector Frederick hand Luther over to the pope. Desiderius Erasmus trivializes the matter. The Elector says Luther will appear at the Diet of Worms.

At Worms Luther is asked if he acknowledges his writings and whether he will retract any of them. Luther answers that he will not recant, saying, "Here I stand. I can do no other. God help me. Amen." Emperor Charles V outlaws Luther, giving him twenty-one days to return to Wittenberg. Elector Frederick has Luther quietly abducted to the Wartburg near Eisenach where Luther stays in hiding for almost a year. Here he translates the New Testament into German.

Luther's exile ends with Karlstadt's uprising in Wittenberg and the Electorate of Saxony, in which churches are desecrated. Luther preaches his "how dare you" (Invocavit) sermons to restore order. Luther marries former nun Katharina von Bora to the delight of his father, who attends the wedding. Luther is dismayed that he cannot join his fellow reformers in Augsburg as they appear before the diet in 1530. The Augsburg Confession is presented to the emperor followed by the pealing of bells, and Luther offers a prayer of thanksgiving for God's faithfulness to his generation. His congregation, young and old, rich and poor alike, sing his hymn "A Mighty Fortress Is Our God"

== Cast ==
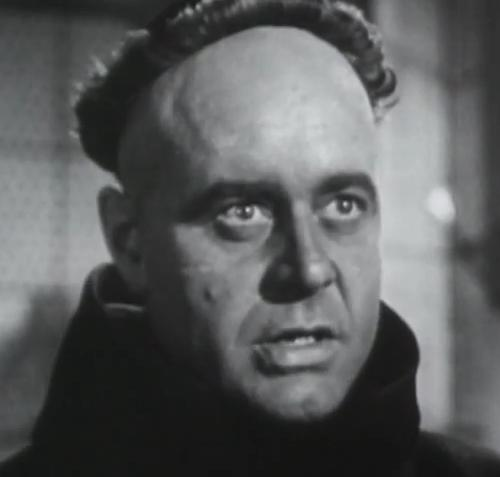
MacGinnis in the film

- Niall MacGinnis as Martin Luther
- John Ruddock as Vicar Johann von Staupitz
- Pierre Lefevre as George Spalatin
- Guy Verney as Philipp Melanchthon
- Allastair Hunter as Andreas Bodenstein von Karlstadt
- David Horne as Elector Duke Frederick the Wise
- Fred Johnson as Prior of Erfurt monastery
- Philip Leaver as Pope Leo X
- Heinz Piper as Dr. John Eck
- Leonard White as brother and emissary of Archbishop Albrecht of Mainz
- Egon Strohm as Cardinal Aleander
- Annette Carell as Katharina von Bora
- Alexander Gauge as Fr. John Tetzel
- Irving Pichel as Chancellor Brueck
- Hans Lefebre as Emperor Charles V
- John Wiggin as Narrator
- Henry Oscar
- Ronald Adam
- Joss Ambler
- William Abney
- Michael Maick
- Wolfgang Oelze

== Historical inconsistencies ==
- Pope Julius II is represented as being in Rome when Luther was there when, in reality, he was not.
- Tetzel is represented as saying that no confession was necessary when one bought the indulgences he was selling when, in reality, the indulgences specified that the buyer was to go to confession if he had bought the indulgence for himself.
- Luther's 1520 treatises are represented as having been in print by June 15, 1520 when Exsurge Domine was issued when, in reality, they had not.
- Luther is represented as telling Karlstadt to leave Wittenberg in 1522 when, in reality, Luther pleaded with him in Orlamünde to return after Karlstadt had voluntarily left.
- Luther is represented as being at home in Wittenberg during the Diet of Augsburg in 1530 when, in reality, he was staying in Coburg.
- The isometric form of "A Mighty Fortress Is Our God" did not exist in Luther's time; It was a product of the later Pietistic movement which found fault with early rhythmic chorale melodies because their dance-like rhythms were too secular in nature.

== Reception ==
The film received positive reviews from critics. Bosley Crowther of The New York Times praised the film as "a brilliant demonstration of strongly disciplined emotions and intellects," with dialogue "done with such forceful delivery and in such well-staged and well-assembled scenes that it commands intelligent attention and stimulates the mind." Variety wrote: "An artistic achievement of its kind, reflecting careful research and preparation, boasting a magnificent performance by Niall MacGinnis, of London's Old Vic, in the title role, and given reverential, straightforward, honest, sincere treatment, as well as eschewing anything savoring of sensationalism, it is well calculated to stir the enthusiasm of Lutheran and Protestant ministers along with the more devoted laity." Harrison's Reports called the picture "tops" and thought the entire cast did "superb work." John McCarten of The New Yorker wrote that every player in the cast "commands attention," and thought that the documentary-like film techniques were used "to good advantage." The Monthly Film Bulletin found the film increasingly "tedious" as there was "no dramatic structure as such," but nonetheless concluded, "That the film was made at all, however, and that its honesty and truth hold their own for so long, is as remarkable as creditable."

== Censorship ==
The film failed to be approved by Quebec's film censorship board, which was made up entirely of French-speaking Catholics, because Luther's radical teachings remained as heretical in 1953 as they were in the 16th century, and thus was never released in Quebec's movie theaters; it could be seen there only in the basements of Protestant churches.
