= Tara (given name) =

- Pronunciation: UK: /ˈtɑːrə/ US: /ˈtærə/
- Gender: Unisex (predominantly feminine)

Origin
- Languages: Sanskrit, Irish
- Origin: Sanskrit, Irish, Persian
- Meaning: Queen; Star; Goddess of the sea; Diamond

Other names
- Related names: Terra, Tamara

Tara is a given name with multiple meanings in different cultures.

In Ireland, it is derived from the Hill of Tara, an archaeological site located near the River Boyne in County Meath, which according to tradition was the seat of the High King of Ireland. The name was popular in the United States during the 1970s, probably due to Tara being the name of the O'Haras' plantation in the 1939 film Gone with the Wind. There were also characters with the name in the 1960s British television series The Avengers (see Tara King) and the long-running American soap opera All My Children (see Tara Martin). In Ireland, it ranked between the 30th and 40th most popular girl's name from 2000 to 2005.

In South Asian countries, such as India and Nepal, Tara derives from a Sanskrit word meaning "star'" and symbolizes the light of the soul. It is often considered a feminine name due to its connection to several goddesses; for instance, the female Buddha and the Hindu goddess.

The name is popular in India, Ireland, the United States, Iran and Australia.

The name Tara is accepted as being a feminine name in Western societies, although there have been men, such as Tara Browne, who carried the name.

== Meanings in different languages ==
- Irish Gaelic: from the Hill of Tara (Cnoc na Teamhrach), the legendary seat of the High King of Ireland
- In Serbia the name is often associated with the mountain of Tara and the national park surrounding it, as well as the River Tara in Montenegro and Bosnia and Herzegovina
- Sanskrit, Hindi, Urdu, Nepali, Marathi, Persian, Punjabi, Kurdish, Tamil, Bengali, Telugu, Sinhalese: "star"

== People named Tara ==
=== Women ===
- Tara (Assamese actress) (1944–2007), actress
- Tara (Kannada actress) (born 1967), actress in Kannada language film
- Tära (born 2003), Palestinian-Italian singer-songwriter
- Tara Allain (born 1985), beauty pageant participant
- Tara Andrews (born 1994), Australian association football player
- Tara Aghdashloo (born 1988), Iranian writer
- Tara Armstrong, Canadian politician
- Tara Lynne Barr (born 1993), American actress
- Tara Alisha Berry (born 1988), Indian film actress
- Tara Betts, American author
- Tara Blaise (born 1975), Irish pop, folk, rock singer
- Tara Bouman (born 1970), Dutch basset horn, clarinet and bass clarinet player
- Tara Brabazon (born 1969), Canadian professor of communication
- Tara Brach (born 1953), American psychologist and expert on Buddhist meditation
- Tara Brown (born 1968), Australian television presenter
- Tara Buck (born 1975), American actress
- Tara Buckman (born 1956), American television and film actress
- Tara Calico (born 1969), American woman who disappeared
- Tara Campbell (born 1983), Canadian water polo player
- Tara Carter, Anguillan politician
- Tara Cherian (1913–2000), Indian politician
- Tara Conner (born 1985), Miss USA 2006
- Tara Cox (born 1971), New Zealand association football player
- Tara Cross-Battle (born 1968), American volleyball player
- Tara Croxford (born 1968), Canadian field hockey player
- Tara D'Souza, (born 1986), Indian film actress/model
- Tara Dakides (born 1975), American snowboarder
- Tara Deshpande (born 1975), Indian actress, writer, model, and MTV VJ
- Tara Dettman, Canadian music artist and songwriter
- Tara Devi (1945–2006), Nepali singer
- Tara Donovan (born 1969), American artist
- Tara Dragas (born 2007), Italian rhythmic gymnast
- Tara Fela-Durotoye (born 1977), Nigerian makeup artist and lawyer
- Tara Fares (1996–2018), Iraqi model
- Tara Feser (born 1980), Canadian wheelchair basketball player
- Tara Fitzgerald (born 1967), English actress
- Tara Flanagan (born 1964), American judge
- Tara Flynn, Irish actress
- Tara Anne Fonseca, Indian model
- Tara George (born 1973), Canadian curler
- Tara Geraghty-Moats (born 1993), American ski jumper
- Tara Ghassemieh, American ballerina
- Tara Lynn Grant (1972–2007), American woman murdered by her husband
- Tara Gray (born 1979), American beauty queen
- Tara Grinstead (born 1974), American woman who is missing
- Tara Lyn Hart (born 1978) Canadian singer/songwriter
- Tara Dawn Holland (born 1972), Miss America 1997
- Tara Hoyos-Martínez (born 1990), English beauty pageant titleholder
- Tara Hudiburg, American forest scientist
- Tara Hunt (born 1973), Canadian author, speaker and startup founder
- Tara Hurley (born 1976), American director
- Tara Iyer (born 1988), Indian tennis player
- Tara Jackson, American lawyer and public administrator
- Tara Jaff, (born 1958), Iraqi Kurdish musician
- Tara Jarmon, Canadian fashion designer based in Paris
- Tara Karsian (born 1965), American stage and film actress
- Tara Keck (born 1978), American-British Neuroscientist
- Tara Kemp (born 1964), American pop and R&B singer
- Tara Killian (born 1977), American film and television actress
- Tara Kirk (born 1982), American swimmer
- Tara LaRosa (born 1978), American mixed martial artist
- Tara Lemmey, American entrepreneur, technology expert, and innovation strategist
- Tara Leniston (born 1983), Irish actress
- Tara Lipinski (born 1982), American figure skater
- Tara Llanes (born 1976), American bicycle motocross and mountain bike racer
- Tara Mack (born 1983), American politician
- Tara McCormack, British academic and author
- Tara McDonald, English songwriter and vocalist
- Tara MacLean (born 1973), Canadian singer and songwriter
- Tara McKelvey, American journalist
- Tara McLeod, Canadian guitarist
- Tara McNeill, Irish violinist, harpist, and singer
- Tara McPherson (born 1976), American artist
- Tara Moore (born 1992), English tennis player
- Tara Moran (born 1971), English actress
- Tara Morgan (born 1989), Australian rules footballer
- Tara Morice (born 1964), Australian actress, singer, and dancer
- Tara Moss (born 1973), Canadian-Australian author
- Tara Mounsey (born 1978), American hockey player
- Tara Murray, American politician
- Tara Nelson, Canadian television journalist and news anchor
- Tara Newley (born 1963), American English singer and actor
- Tara Neyland (born 1994), Australian para-cyclist
- Tara Nott (born 1972), American weightlifter
- Tara Jane O'Neil (born 1972) (sometimes ONeil or TJO), American instrumentalist, songwriter, audio engineer, and artist
- Tara Lynne O'Neill, Irish film, theatre and television actress
- Tara O'Toole, American Under Secretary in the Department of Homeland Security
- Tara Oram (born 1984), Canadian Country singer
- Tara Osseck (born 1986), beauty pageant participant
- Tara Palmer-Tomkinson (1971–2017), English socialite also known as T P-T
- Tara N. Palmore, American physician-scientist and epidemiologist
- Tara Parker-Pope, American author and columnist
- Tara Leigh Patrick (born 1972), American model and entertainer, aka Carmen Electra
- Tara Peters, American politician from Missouri
- Tara Platt (born 1980), American film and television actress
- Tara Priya (born 1989), American singer-songwriter and vocalist
- Tara Proctor (born 1971), English footballer
- Tara Reid (born 1975), American actress
- Tara Rushton (born 1984), Australian model and actress
- Tara Ruttledge (born 1991), Irish camogie player
- Tara Ruttley, American scientist
- Tara Sad (born 1953), American politician
- Tara Sands (born 1975), American voice actress, television host and actress
- Tara Govind Sapre (1919–1981), Indian National Congress politician
- Tara Seibel (born 1973), American cartoonist, graphic designer and illustrator
- Tara Sharma (born 1977), British-Indian actress
- Tara Simmons (1984–2019), Australian musician
- Tara Singh (disambiguation), several names
- Tara Slone (born 1973), Canadian rock vocalist
- Tara Smith (born 1961), American professor of philosophy
- Tara Bray Smith, (born 1970), American author
- Tara Snyder (born 1977), American tennis player
- Tara Spencer-Nairn (born 1978), Canadian actress
- Tara Rani Srivastava, Indian woman freedom fighter
- Tara-Jane Stanley, English Rugby League player
- Tara Stevens (born 1972), British journalist of Welsh extraction, based in Barcelona
- Tara Stiles (born 1981), American model turned yoga instructor
- Tara Strohmeier, American actress
- Tara Strong (born 1973), Canadian-American actress
- Tara Subkoff (born 1972), American actress and fashion designer
- Tara Summers (born 1979), English actress
- Tara Sundari (1878–1948), Bengali theater actress, singer, and dancer
- Tara Sutaria (born 1995), Indian actress
- Tara Sutton, Canadian journalist and filmmaker
- Tara Teng (born 1989), Canadian abolitionist
- Tara the Southern Belle, a member of the Southern Belles tag-team from the Gorgeous Ladies of Wrestling
- Tara VanDerveer (born 1953), American basketball coach
- Tara VanFlower, American vocalist
- Tara Singh Varma (born 1948), Dutch politician
- Tara Watchorn (born 1990), Canadian ice hockey player
- Tara Westover (born 1986), American memoirist, essayist and historian
- Tara Whitten (born 1980), Canadian track racing cyclist
- Tara Lynn Wilson (born 1982), Canadian actress
- Tara June Winch (born 1983), Australian writer
- Tara Würth (born 2002), Croatian tennis player
- Tara Zahra (born 1976), American professor

=== Men ===
- Tara Browne (1945–1966), London socialite
- Tara Chand (Pakistani politician), Pakistani politician
- Tara Hong, Cambodian-born American politician
- Tara Singh Hayer (1936–1998), Sikh Canadian newspaper publisher
- Tara Singh Malhotra (1885–1967), Sikh political and religious leader
- Tara Singh Ramgarhia, 18th century Sikh leader
- Tara Römer (1974–1999), French actor
- Tara Te Irirangi (1780s – 1852), chief of Ngāi Tai ki Tāmaki tribe

== Deities ==
- Tara (Buddhism), a tantric meditation deity in Tibetan Buddhism, actually the generic name for a set of similar bodhisattvas
- Tara (Devi), a Hindu goddess and consort of Shiva

== Fictional characters ==
- Tara o' Helium, a princess in the Barsoom novels of Edgar Rice Burroughs
- Tara Webster, the main character in the Australian teen-oriented television drama Dance Academy
- Tara, a sword and sorcery heroine in DC Comics' Warlord
- Tara, an android in Marvel Comics' New Invaders
- Tara in the film Shrooms
- Tara, a playable character in Brawl Stars
- Tara Adams, the main character in the Disney Channel Original Movie Radio Rebel
- Tara Carpenter in the 2022 film Scream
- Tara Chambler in the TV series The Walking Dead
- Tara Desai in the TV series Twisted
- Tara Duncan, heroine of a series of French novels by Sophie Audouin-Mamikonian
- Tara Fremont, also called "Tara, the Jungle Girl" and "Too Tall Tara", a superhero in AC Comics
- Tara Gregson, a character in United States of Tara
- Tara King in the TV series The Avengers
- Tara Knowles in the TV series Sons of Anarchy
- Tara*Starr Lane in the novels P.S. Longer Letter Later and Snail Mail No More by Ann M. Martin and Paula Danziger
- Tara Locke in the soap opera The Young and the Restless
- Tara Maclay in the TV series Buffy the Vampire Slayer
- Tara Mandal in the soap opera Coronation Street
- Tara Markov, the first character known as Terra in DC Comics
- Tara Mehta, an incarnate deity in Virgin Comics' Devi comic book
- Tara Price in the crime drama CSI: Miami
- Tara Rafferty in the Irish television series Striking Out
- Tara Reynolds in the soap opera Emmerdale
- Tara Thornton in the TV series True Blood
- Tara Wilson in the TV series The Practice and its spinoff Boston Legal Legal
