= Amber Brown =

Amber Brown may refer to:

- Amber Brown (book series), a series of realistic fiction books for children by Paula Danziger
- Amber Brown (TV series), an American family comedy television series based on the book series
- Amber Brown (fighter), American mixed martial arts fighter
