= Nawarupa =

Chimeric creature found in Rakhine mythology

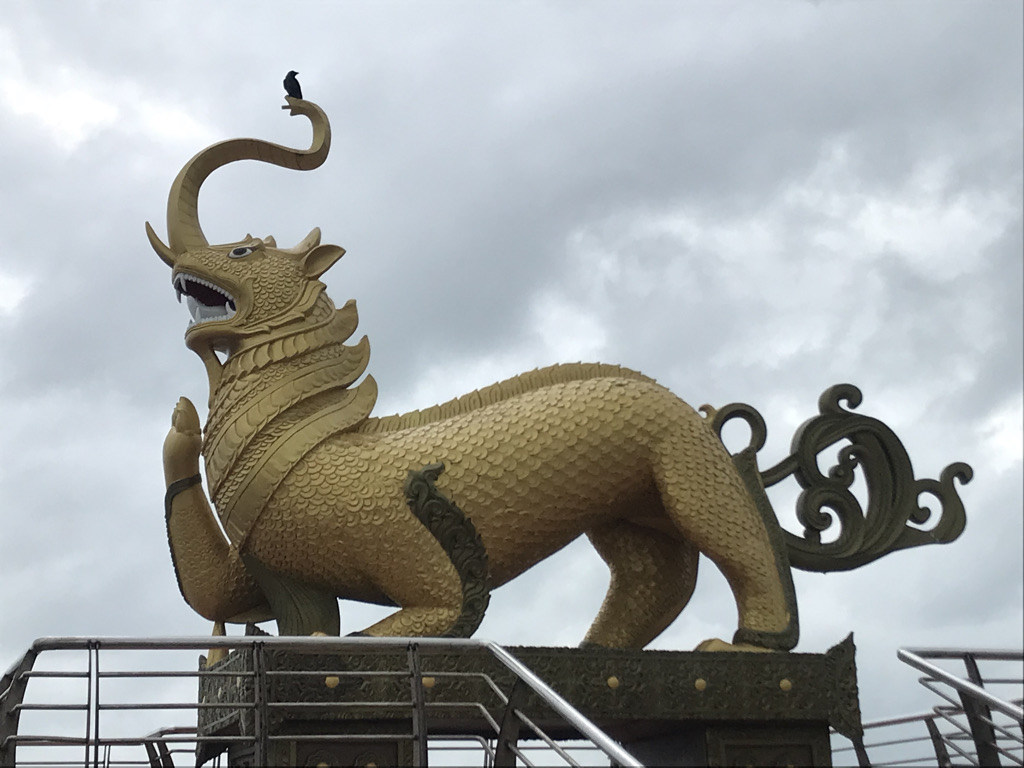
A Bya La statue (the Rakhine version of the Nawarupa) at the Sittwe Viewpoint park in Myanmar.

Nawarupa (Burmese: နဝရူပ, also spelt Nawa Rupa; Pali: navarūpa, Sanskrit: नवरूप, lit. 'nine forms'), also known as Byala (Rakhine: ဗျာလ, ဗျာလ္လ), is a chimeric creature found in Burmese and Rakhine (Arakanese) mythology.

== Description ==
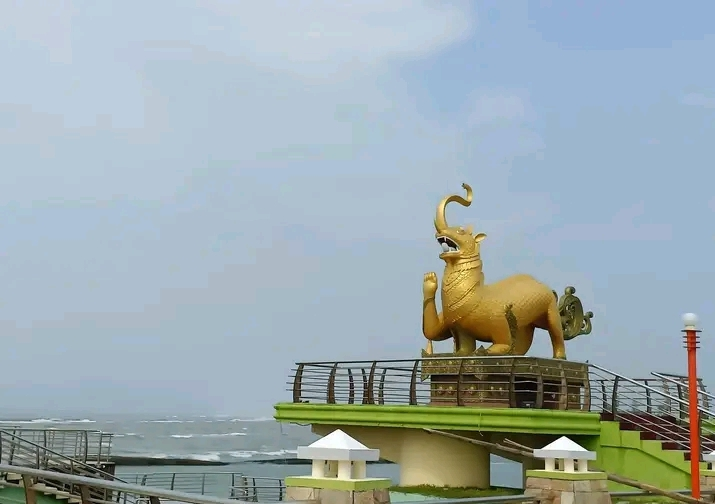
Far view of the Bya La statue

The beast is made of 9 animals, possessing the head of an elephant, the eyes of a deer, the horns of a rhinoceros, the tongue and wings of a parrot, the body and legs of a lion, and the tail of a peafowl. In the Konbaung dynasty, the nawarupa decorated one of the ceremonial royal barges.

== See also ==
- Mythical creatures in Burmese folklore
- Yali (mythology)
- List of hybrid creatures in folklore
- Hatsadiling
- Pyinsarupa
- Navagunjara
- Jagannath
