= The dog ate my homework =

Excuse for not having performed a task

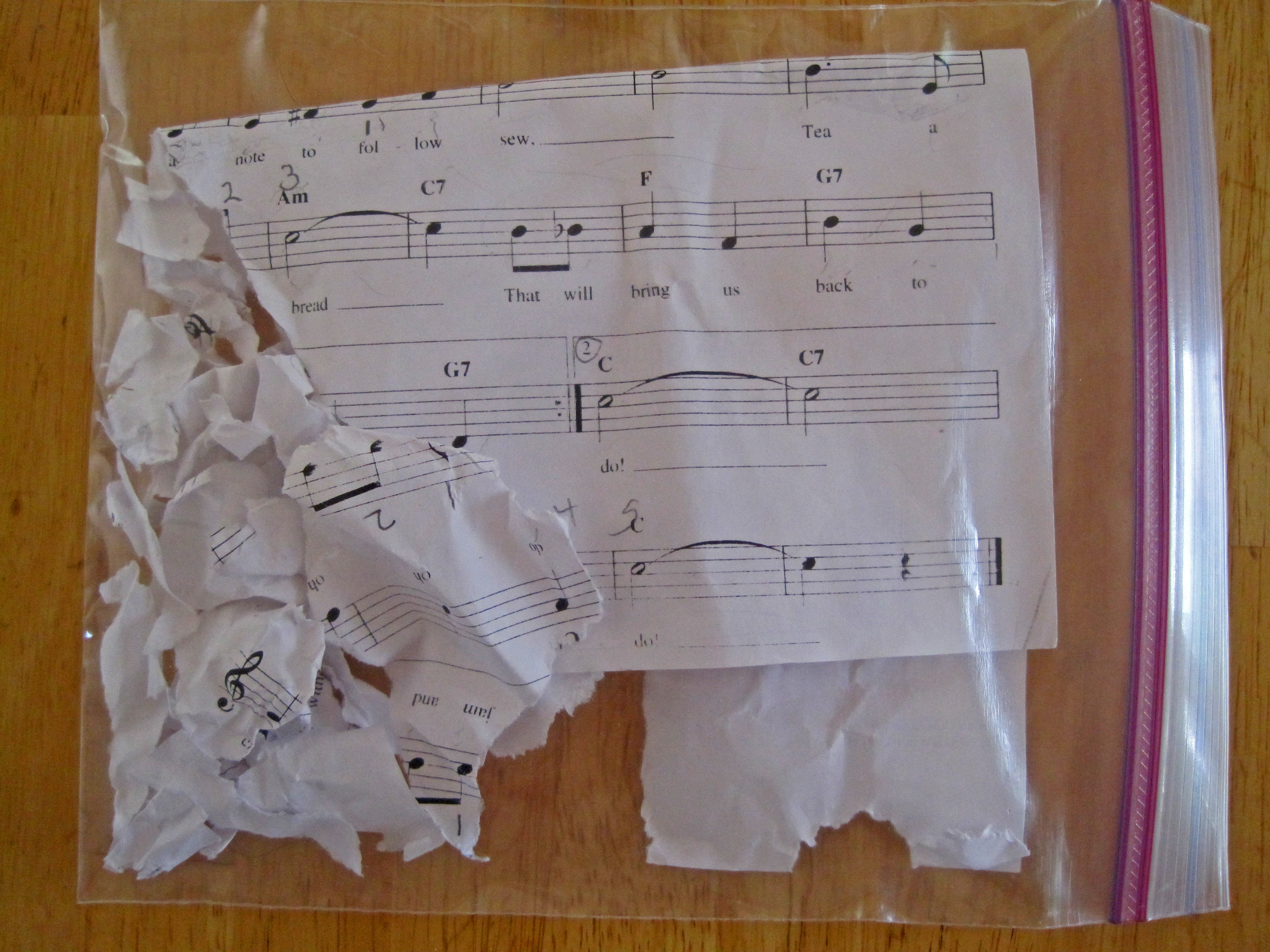
Music homework purportedly partially eaten by a dog

"The dog ate my homework", or "my dog ate my homework", is an expression which carries the suggestion of being a common, poorly fabricated excuse made by children to explain why they have failed to turn in an assignment on time. The phrase is also referenced outside of an academic context, as a sarcastic response to any similarly insufficient or implausible explanation for failure.

The claim of a dog eating one's homework is inherently suspect since it is both nearly impossible for a teacher to disprove and conveniently absolves the student of any blame. However, the claim is not absolutely beyond possibility, since dogs are known to eat or chew on paper; John Steinbeck was once forced to ask his editor for additional time due to half the manuscript of Of Mice and Men having been eaten by his Irish Setter.

As an explanation for missing documents, it dates to a story about a Welsh minister first recorded in print in 1905. The Oxford English Dictionary suggests that a 1929 reference establishes that schoolchildren had at some time earlier than that offered it as an excuse to teachers. It was used multiple times in the 1964 bestselling novel Up the Down Staircase, and became known as a stereotypical dubious excuse, particularly in American culture, both in school and out, in the 1970s. American presidents from Ronald Reagan to Barack Obama have used it to criticize political opponents, and it has been a source of humor for various comic strips and television shows, such as The Simpsons.

== History ==
=== Origins ===
The earliest known variation on the idea that written work might be adversely affected by the tendency of some dogs to chew on paper came in a 1905 issue of The Cambrian, a magazine for Welsh Americans. William ApMadoc, the journal's music critic, related an anecdote about a minister temporarily filling in at a country church in Wales. After one service, he cautiously asked the clerk how his sermon had been received, in particular whether it had been long enough. Upon being assured that it was, he admitted to the clerk that his dog had eaten some of the paper it was written on just before the service. "Couldn't you give our wicar a pup o' that 'ere dawg, sir?" was the punchline, in Welsh dialect. ApMadoc applied the lesson to some overly long musical compositions, but wondered whether the dogs might suffer indigestion from consuming paper.

Six years later, the president of the Fire Underwriters' Association of the Northwest was recorded repeating the anecdote at the organization's 42nd annual meeting. He describes it as Scottish in origin, and some of the details vary. The visiting minister speaks instead to a younger member of the congregation, who complains that the sermon was too short. In his telling, the dog was not his but one in the street who ate some of the papers after a wind blew them out of his hand. This elicits the same response, rendered in Standard English rather than dialect.

The excuse for the brevity of the document did not become the punchline for another 18 years. The first use of the phrase recorded by the Oxford English Dictionary was in 1929, in an essay in the British newspaper The Guardian: "It is a long time since I have had the excuse about the dog tearing up the arithmetic homework." This suggests it had been in use among students for some time prior to that.

External videos
- Video of a dog eating alleged homework

It was first reported in an American context in 1965. Bel Kaufman's bestselling comic novel, Up the Down Staircase, published that year, includes two instances where the protagonist's students blame their failure to complete their assignment on their dogs. In a section written as drama early in the book, one student refers to "a terrible tragedy ... My dog went on my homework!" Later, a list of excuses includes "My dog chewed it up" and "the cat chewed it up and there was no time to do it over."

=== Popularization ===
The phrase became widely used in the 1970s. Young adult novelist Paula Danziger paid homage to it with the title of her 1974 debut, The Cat Ate My Gymsuit. Two years later Eugene Kennedy described Richard Nixon as "working on the greatest American excuse since 'the dog ate my homework'" in the Watergate tapes, and the following year John R. Powers had a character in his novel The Unoriginal Sinner and the Ice-Cream God reminisce about having used that excuse as a student. Lexicographer Barry Popik, who called it "the classic lame excuse that a student makes to a teacher to cover for missing homework", found citations in print increasing from 1976.

During the next decade, personal computers became more common in American households and schools, and many students began writing papers with word processors. This provided them with another possible excuse for missing homework, in the form of computer malfunctions. Still, "the dog ate my homework" remained common. In a 1987 article on this phenomenon, one teacher recalled to The New York Times that once a student had given him a note signed by a parent saying that the dog had eaten his homework. The following year President Ronald Reagan lamented Congress's apparent failure to pass that year's federal budget on time, "I had hoped that we had marked the end of the 'dog-ate-my-homework' era of Congressional budgetry", he told reporters on canceling a planned news conference to sign the bills, "but it was not to be". His use showed that the phrase had become more generalized in American discourse as referring to any insufficient or unconvincing excuse.

Use of the phrase in printed matter rose steadily through the end of the century. It leveled off in the early years of the 2000s, but has not declined. During the 2012 United States presidential campaign, Barack Obama's campaign used it to rebuke Mitt Romney for not participating in Nickelodeon's "Kids Pick the President" special. "'The dog ate my homework' just doesn't cut it when you're running for president."

== In popular culture ==
In 1989, the popular sitcom Saved By The Bell debuted. Its theme song included the line "the dog ate all my homework last night".

A 1989 episode of Full House had the Tanners' new puppy, Comet, actually eat D.J.'s book report along with other household items (namely, Danny's favorite tie and one of D.J.'s toddler sister Michelle's bunny slippers, although Danny says that Comet actually drooled on the bunny slipper). D.J., knowing the excuse is a cliché, decides against telling her teacher what happened, and tells Danny that she will claim Michelle ate it.

It became an occasional running gag on The Simpsons, which also began airing that year, mostly playing off Bart's tendency to offer ridiculous excuses for all sorts of misconduct to his teacher, Mrs. Krabappel. In the 1991 episode "Bart the Murderer", a difficult day for Bart begins with Santa's Little Helper, the family dog, eating his homework. "I didn't know dogs really did that," he remarks, and finds his teacher equally incredulous since he had used that excuse before. In a later episode, when the dog goes to work for the police, Bart must eat his own homework for the excuse to work. When Mrs. Krabappel begins dating Ned Flanders, the Simpsons' neighbor, at the end of the 2011 season, she sees Santa's Little Helper in the Simpsons' yard and asks if he is the dog who has eaten Bart's homework so many times. Bart's attempts to demonstrate this and thus lend credibility to his use of the excuse backfire.

In a 2000 episode of the animated television series CatDog featuring an anthropomorphic cat/dog conjoined twin, Cat hatched a plan to get rich by having Dog eat other people's homework.

Humorists have also punned on the phrase. A Sam Gross New Yorker cartoon from 1996 shows a Venetian classroom of several centuries ago where a standing student announces "The Doge ate my homework."

Comic strips that feature anthropomorphized dogs as characters have found the concept of those characters eating homework a source of humor. In one of his Far Side panels, Gary Larson depicted a classroom of dogs whose teacher asks, "Did anyone here not eat his or her homework on the way to school?" In a 1991 Dilbert strip, a boy on the street asks Dogbert to chew on his homework so he can have the excuse; in the last panel the boy, beaten, is shown in class claiming a dog made him eat it.

There have been three different books that used the excuse as a title. Two have been collections of poetry for students with a school theme, and one has been a business book about lessons dogs can teach about accountability. Other books for young readers have had titles blaming aliens and the protagonist's teacher for the missing homework. A two-act children's musical called A Monster Ate My Homework has also been written. The Dog Ate My Homework is the title of a British comedy/competition show first broadcast in 2014 on CBBC.
