= Burmese mythology =

Body of myths and folklores told by the Burmese people from Myanmar

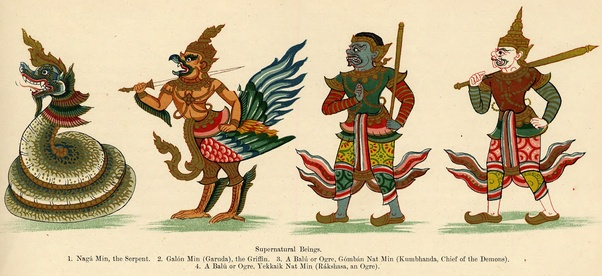
Mythical creatures from Burmese Mythology

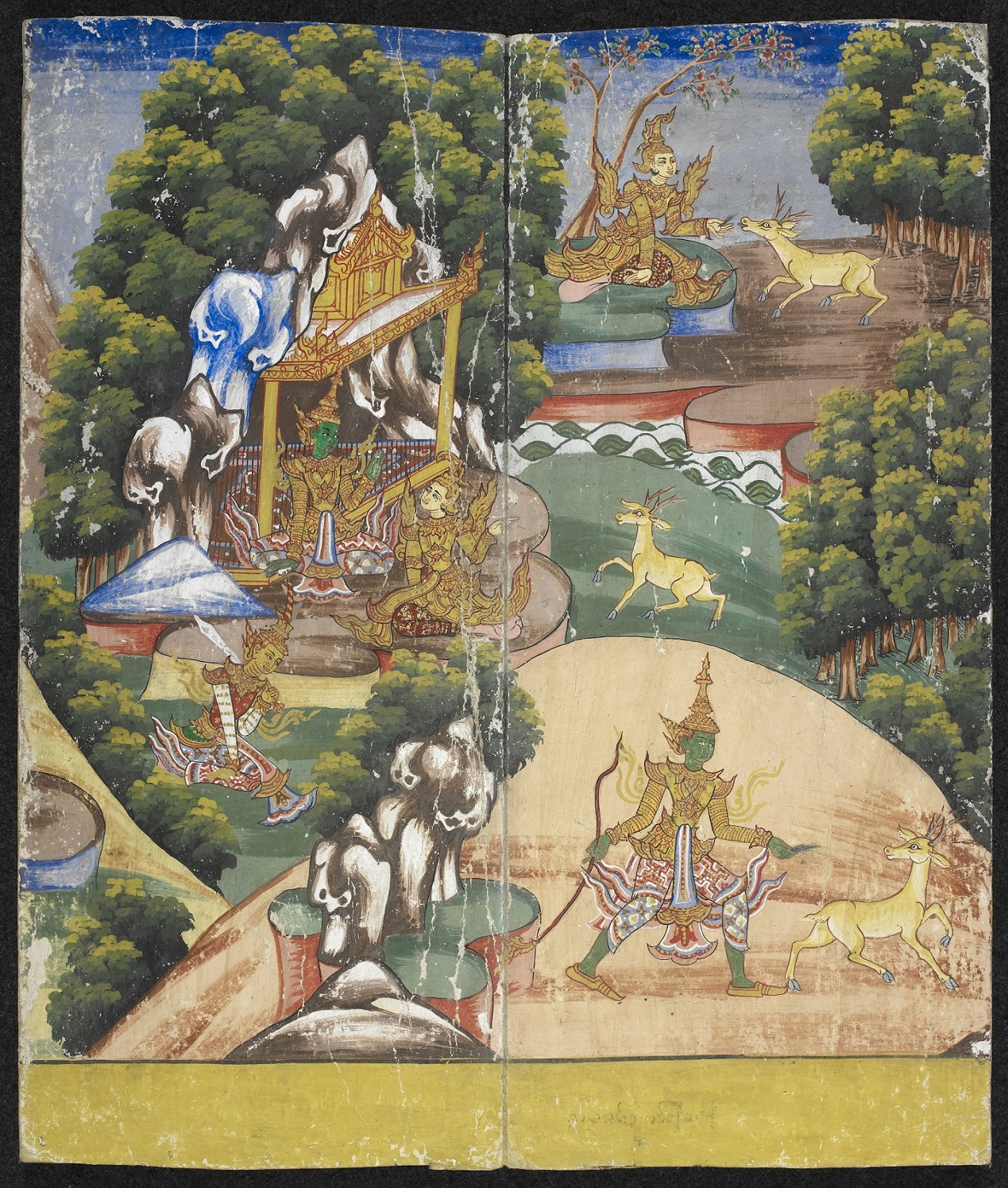
Burmese adaptation of Ramayana

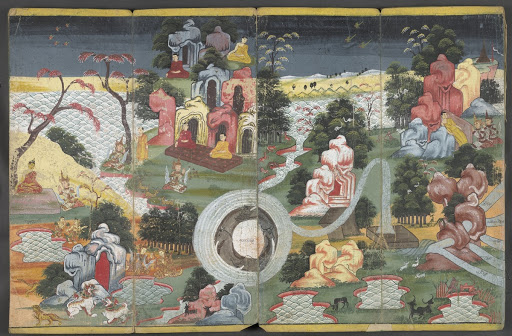
A Burmese parabaik depicting Buddhist mythology

Burmese mythology (Burmese: ရှေးမြန်မာ့ဒဏ္ဍာရီ) is a collection of myths, folklore, legends, and beliefs traditionally told by the Burmese people of Myanmar. These stories have been passed down orally and have only rarely appeared in written form. Burmese mythology is largely associated with influenced by Buddhist mythology, Hinduism, and several other ethnic traditions. Most myths and legends concern the ancient Pyu era; the lives and activities of gods, Bodhisattvas, heroes, kings, mystics, and mythological creatures. Burmese mythology is the cornerstone of modern Burmese culture and explains the origins and significance of Burmese rituals.

== Overview of mythic history ==
=== Cosmogony ===
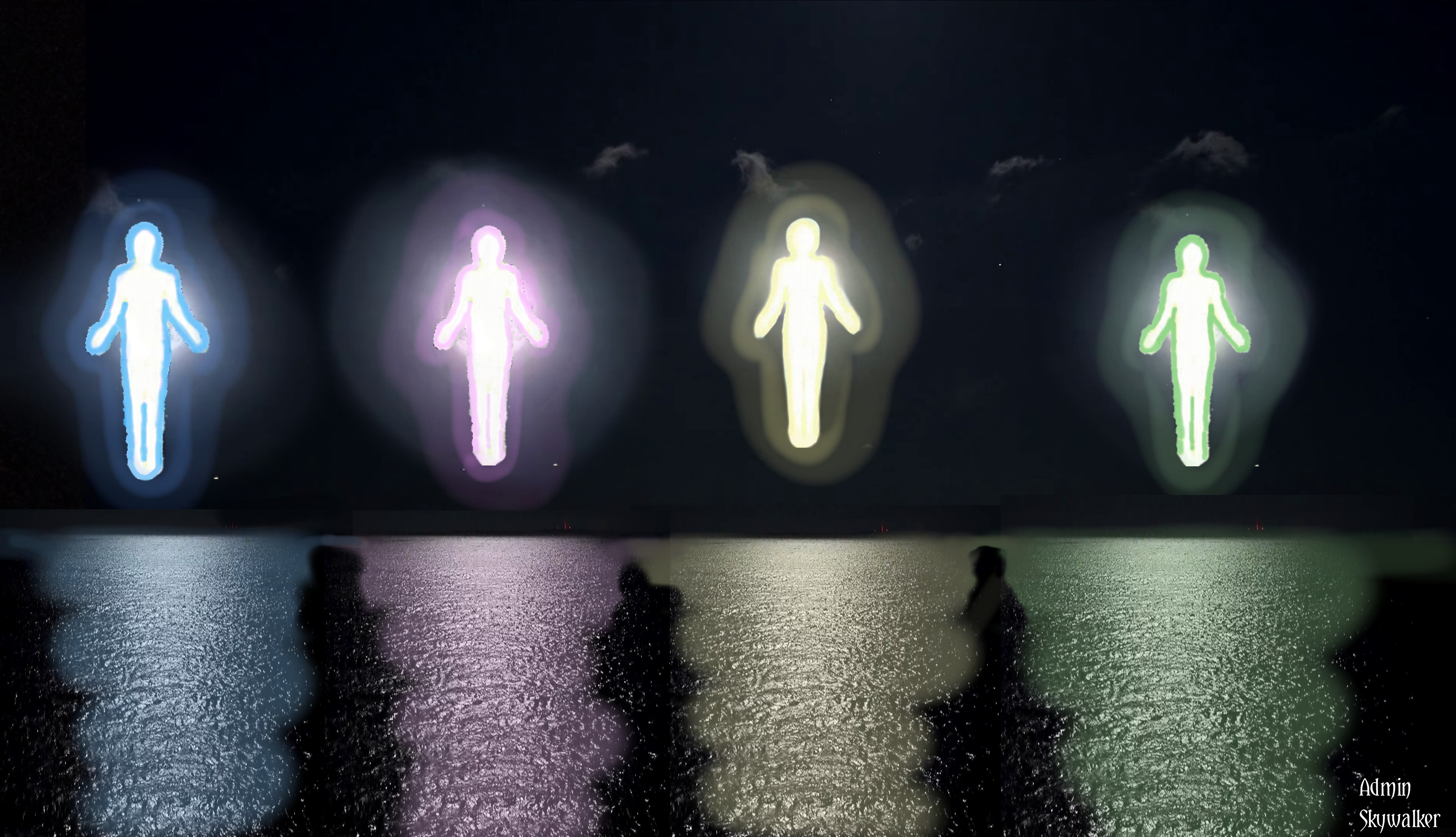
The four Brahmas hovering over the primordial waters

The most influential account for Burmese cosmogony is the Book of Adikalpa (Burmese: အာဒိကပ္ပကျမ်း၊ lit. 'Genesis') which is apocryphal in Buddhism but supported by the canonical statement in Aggañña Sutta.

In the beginning, there was apparently nothing left after an old cosmos was destroyed by the great cataclysm. Soon, a new cosmos (Kalpa) was born out of the expansion.

The four Highest Ones (Brahmas; Burmese: ဗြဟ္မာ) descended from the Coruscant Heavens (Abhasvara) and were reborn on the primordial world as the 'Luminous Ones'. At this time, the Luminous Ones were glorious celestial beings who just fed on their own delight, flying over the primeval ocean. Since the Sun and the Moon didn't exist yet, these Luminous Ones were the only light source in the darkness.

Sometime later, the creamy soil emerged on the ocean, and the Luminous Ones became curious and ate this newly delicious food. Because of their greediness and gluttony, they lost their self-luminous nature and fell from their grace. At this time, the Sun (Surya; သူရိယ), the Moon(Chandra; စန္ဒ) and the Stars (Nakshas-Tara; နက္ခတ်တာရာ) were born from the darkness to replace as the primary light sources of the world.

They became corporeal beings after eating all the creamy soil until it was gone. Then, several other super-vegetated plants emerged for the sake of their hunger. After a long period of serial gluttony, all the supernatural resources went extinct and the beings became known as full humans.

=== The Rise of Civilization ===
People have different views on how to solve a hard life, thus creating the Caste system (အမျိုးဇာတ်စနစ်). Later, they elected a wise man called Manu and appointed him as their first and foremost ruler. He is known as Mahasamrat (မဟာသမ္မတမင်း; lit. 'He who is designated by the multitude'), the first king of the earth. As a king, he constituted the order of the city-state, the code of the laws, the various duties and offices defined for the state and the boundaries of armies of their defense. He will be often referred to as a standard monarch archetype by many Burmese writers.
