= Pyinsarupa =

Chimeric animal from Burmese mythology

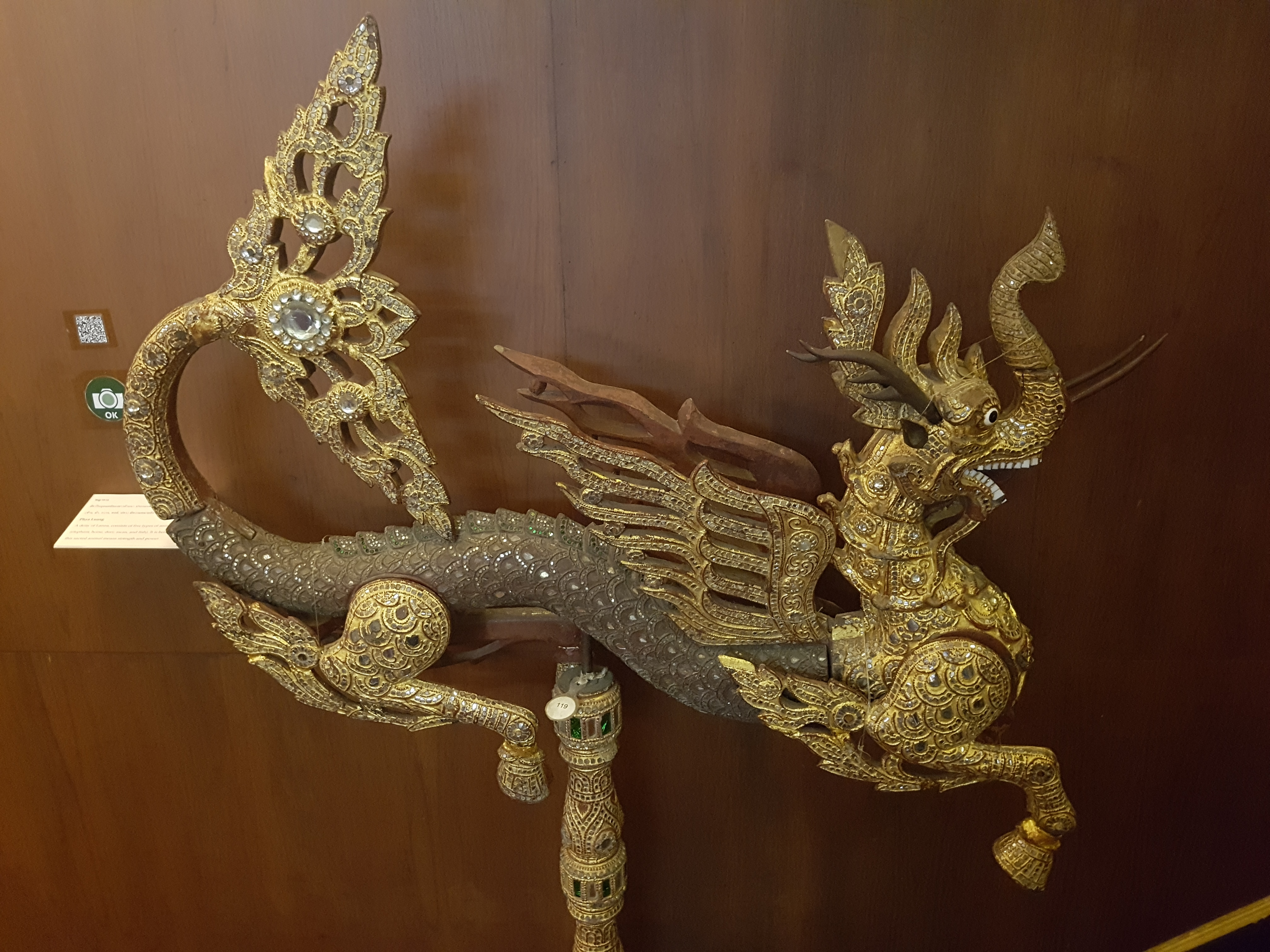
Lanna depiction of the pyinsarupa at Wat Phra Kaew, Chiang Rai

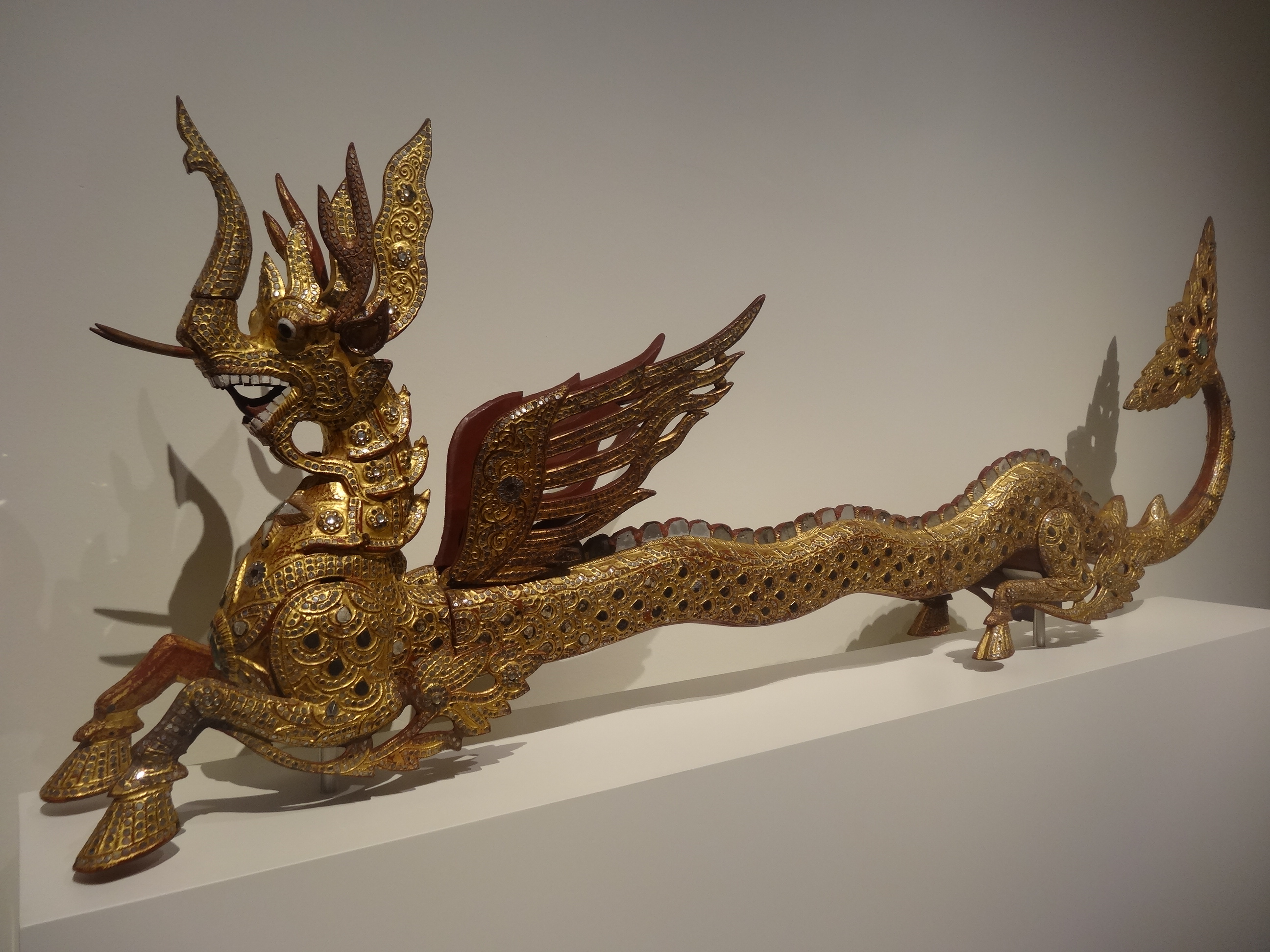
Burmese depiction of the pyinsarupa.

Pyinsarupa (Burmese: ပဉ္စရူပ, [pjɪ̀ɴsa̰ jùpa̰], also spelt pyinsa rupa; Pali: pañcarūpa, lit. 'five forms'), also known as phaya luang (Thai: พญาลวง), is a chimeric animal from Burmese mythology.

== Description ==
The Pyinsarupa is made of parts of an elephant, a bullock, a horse, a white carp (ငါးကြင်း) and a tonaya (တိုးနရား, a mythical horned leodragon), or alternately a lion, an elephant, a water buffalo, a white carp, and a hamsa. The creature is commonly featured in traditional Burmese hsaing waing orchestras, and serves as the logo of Myanmar's flagship air carrier, Myanmar Airways International.

== See also ==
- Mythical creatures in Burmese folklore
- List of hybrid creatures in folklore
- Hatsadiling
- Nawarupa
- Makara
