= Ma Phae Wah =

Ma Phae Wah (Burmese: မဖဲဝါ, also spelt as Ma Phae War; lit. 'yellow-ribbon lady') is a Burmese nat (spirit). She is the guardian spirit of the graveyards and cemeteries in Myanmar.

Ma Phae Wah makes her home in the cemetery, but come midnight, she hoists a coffin onto her shoulder and shuffles through town with her long hair waving in the spectral breeze. Woe to the household where she stops and lays her casket on the doorstep, for someone in that family, usually a child, will soon sicken and die.

== Legend ==
During the reign of King Bagyidaw of Konbaung, Ma Phae Wah was said to be Ma Thae U, a native of Pyay. She had an older brother named Maung Kyan Sit. He served as a clerk to the Duke of Pyay. His title was Min Ye Dibba.

Soon after her parents' death, she was living with her brother and had to rely on him. One day, Maung Kyan Sit rebelled against the Duke of Pyay and fled along the Irrawaddy River. They arrived in a sparsely populated area with many lakes. They lived in obscurity, and Ma Thae U changed her name to Ma Phae Wah and Maung Kyan Sit changed his name to Maung San Hmé. They prospered by working as fishers.

One rainy night, her brother had not returned home for three days, so she worried and went to the lake. Maung San Hmé was drunk and mistakenly killed his sister as a demon. He was extremely sad and drank more than before. His colleagues took him to Shwedagon Pagoda to calm down, but Maung San Hmé could not see the Pagoda's image because of his large sin. Maung San Hmé was ashamed and returned to the village.

When he returned to the lake in a rage, he dropped gold leaves intended for the Shwedagon Pagoda on his lake pillars. Ma Phae Wah became a nat and had no place to live, so she dreamed and asked the abbot of the village monastery for help. The abbot allowed Ma Phae Wah to live in the village cemetery. Ma Phae Wah guarded the cemetery as a spirit, while wearing a yellow robe. Later, Maung San Hmé died of drink and became a nat. He is called "Ta-pwe-sa Maung San Hmé" and worshipped by fishermen.

King Tharrawaddy declared the royal order to Ma Phae Wah as the guardian of the cemeteries during his reign.

== Dream ==
In the late 1990s, Ma Phae Wah appeared in the dream of Tine Tayar Sayadaw, a prominent Buddhist monk from Kayin State. He announced her intention to eat the flesh of babies. The sayadaw suggested that she dine on dogs instead. Subsequently, security-conscious parents sought to protect their infants by posting signs in front of their homes saying, “Baby’s flesh is bitter, dog’s flesh is sweet”.

== See also ==
- Nat (spirit)
- Mythical creatures in Burmese folklore
