= Yali (mythology) =

Hindu mythological creature

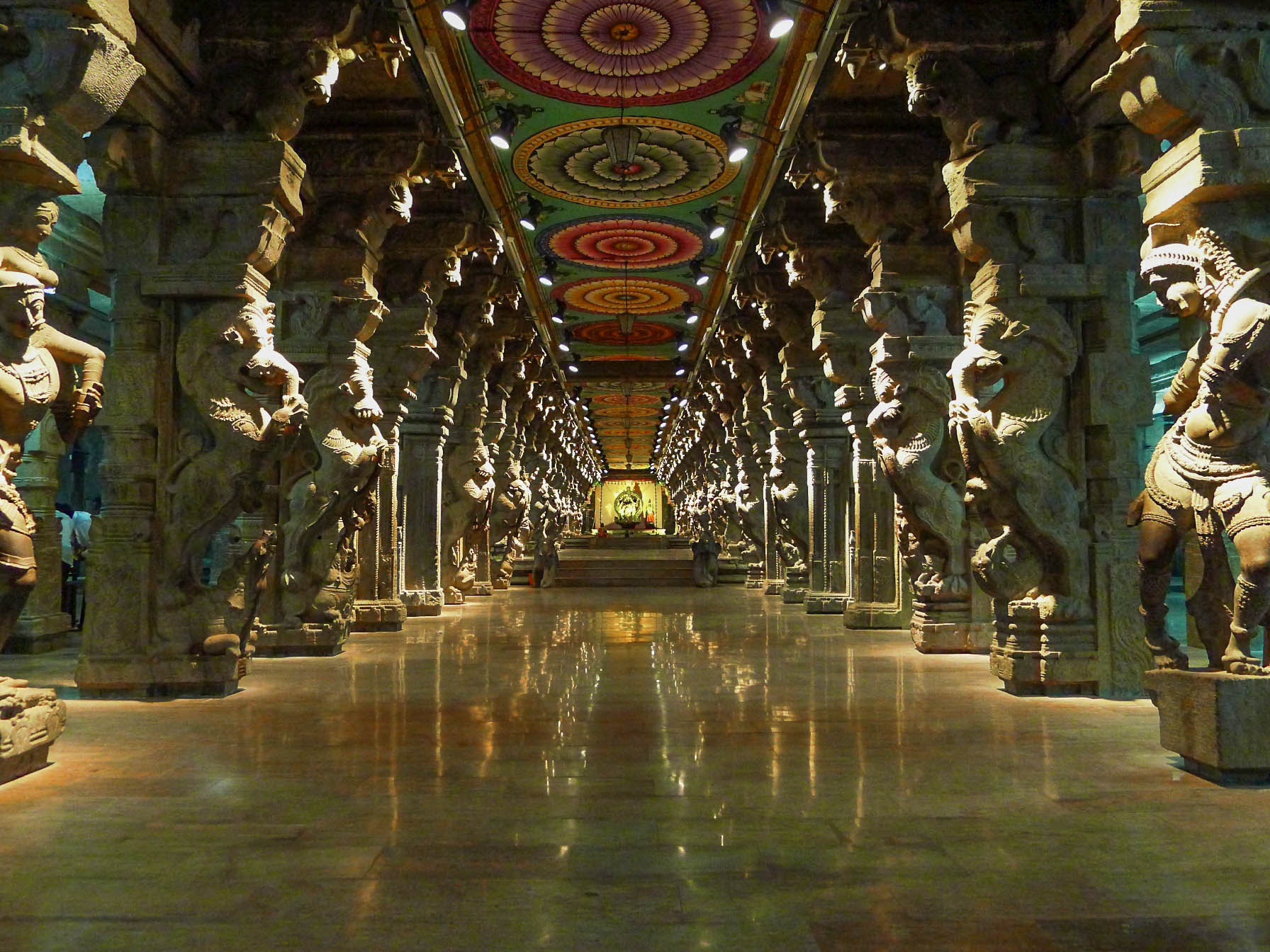
Yali in pillars at Madurai Meenakshi Amman Temple

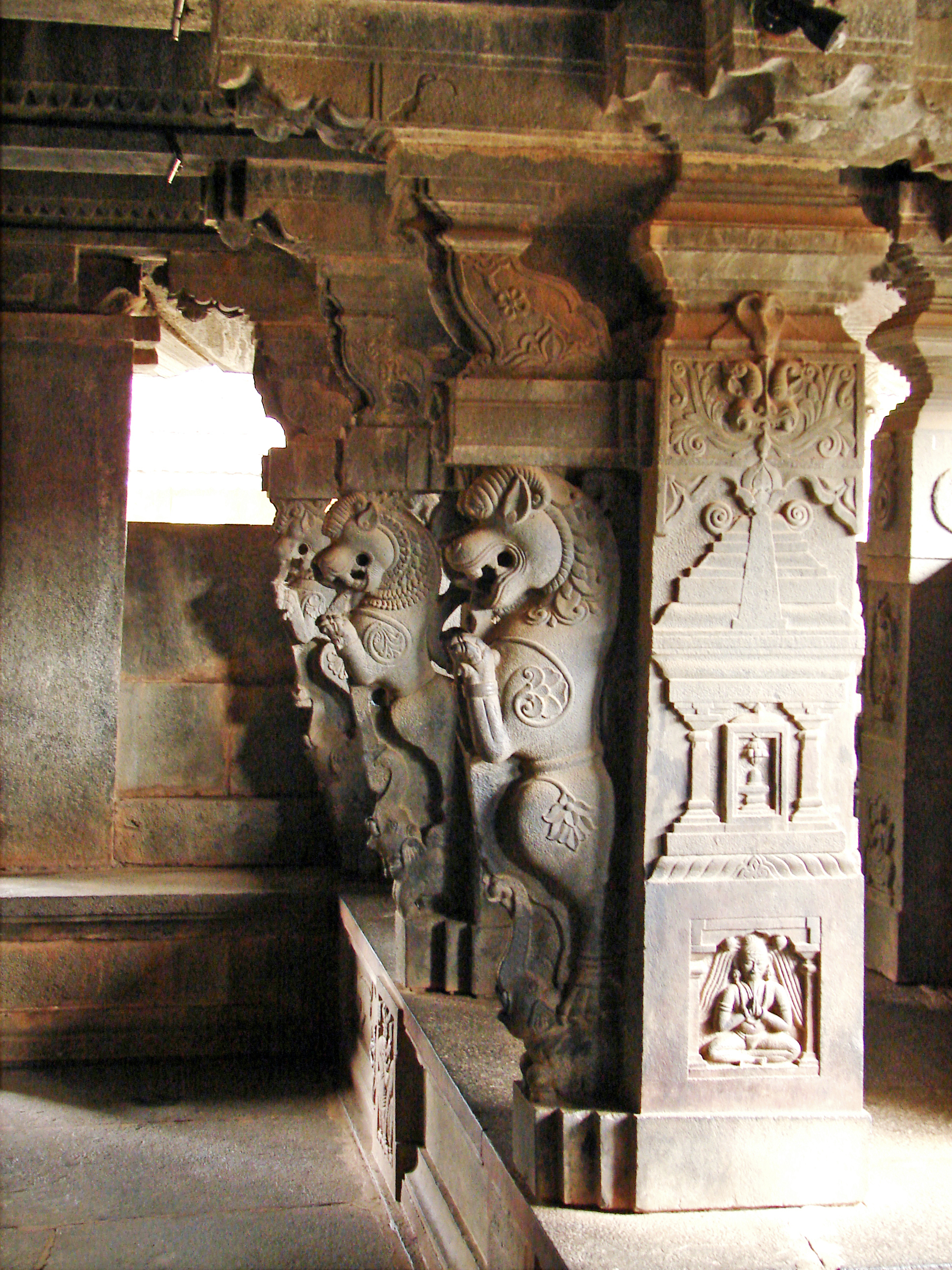
Yali pillars, Rameshwara Temple, Keladi, Shivamogga District, Karnataka state, India

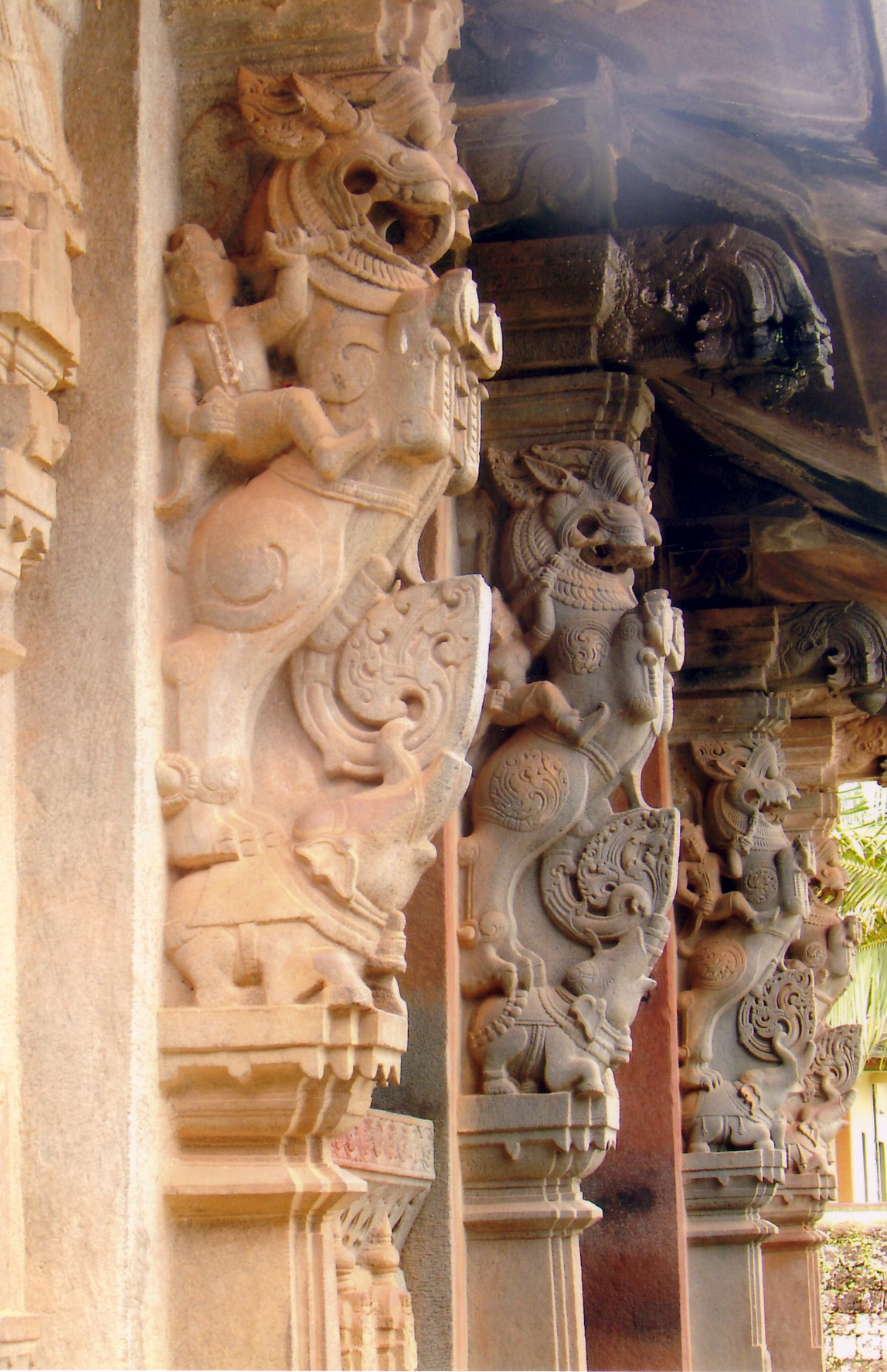
Yali in Aghoreswara temple, Ikkeri, Shivamogga district, Karnataka state, India

Yali (IAST: Yāḷi, Tamil: யாளி), also called Vyāla (Sanskrit: व्याल), is a Hindu mythological creature, portrayed with the head and the body of a lion, the trunk and the tusks of an elephant, and sometimes bearing equine features. Images of the creature occur in many South Indian temples, often sculpted onto the pillars. There also exist variations of the creature, with it possessing the appendages of other beasts. It has sometimes been described as a leogryph (part-lion and part-griffin), with some bird-like features, with the trunk referred to as a proboscis.

Karuna Sagar Behera writes of the virala, or vidala (Sanskrit: vyala) in terms of a "mythical monster used [...] as a sculptural and architectural motif, the representation of vidala is of various types, e.g. gaja-vidala, nara-vidala, etc."

== Iconography ==
Descriptions of, and references to, yalis are ancient, but they became prominent in South Indian sculptures in the 16th century. Yalis were described to be more powerful than the lion, the tiger, or the elephant. In its iconography, the yali has a cat-like body, but the head of a lion with the tusks of an elephant (gaja), and the tail of a serpent. Sometimes, they have been shown standing on the back of a makara, another mythical creature and considered to be the vahana of Budha (Mercury). Some images look like three-dimensional representation of yalis. Images or icons have been found on the entrance walls of the temples, and the graceful mythical lion is believed to protect and guard the temples and ways leading to the temple. They usually have the stylised body of a lion and the head of some other beast, most often an elephant (gaja-vyala). Other common examples are: the lion-headed (simha-vyala), horse- (ashva-vyala), human- (nir-vyala) and the dog-headed (shvana-vyala) ones.

== Symbolism ==
The yali is said to be a guardian creature, protecting human beings both physically and spiritually. It is regarded to be a fearless beast, possessing supremacy over the animal world. It is also believed to be the symbolic representation of man's struggle with the elemental forces of nature. It is even depicted in emblem of Karnataka

== Literature ==
Descriptions of the yali are featured in ancient Tamil literature, dating back to the Sangam era.

== Similarities between Yali and the lion ==
If the Yali was a real animal that once existed, there is a strong possibility that it was a lion, according to some researchers. In Sangam literature, this animal is referred to as 'Aali'. The Yali is generally described as an apex creature that subdues wild animals like tigers and elephants, which otherwise terrorize humans. It is said to be mostly yellow in color and, like elephants, lives in herds. However, literature notes that even a whole herd of elephants or tigers would tremble in fear at the arrival of a single Aali.

Several Sangam poems are cited as evidence for this:

- Akananuru (Poem 78):

"நனந்தலைக் கானத்து ஆளி அஞ்சி,
இனம் தலைத்தரூஉம் எறுழ் கிளர் முன்பின்,
வரி ஞிமிறு ஆர்க்கும், வாய் புகு, கடாத்து,
பொறி நுதற் பொலிந்த வயக் களிற்று ஒருத்தல்
இரும் பிணர்த் தடக் கையின், ஏமுறத் தழுவ"
- (Meaning: Fearing the 'Aali' in the vast forest, a male elephant protectively embraces and guides its female mate).*

- Akananuru (Poem 252):

"இடம் படுபு அறியா வலம் படு வேட்டத்து
வாள் வரி நடுங்கப் புகல்வந்து, ஆளி
உயர் நுதல் யானைப் புகர் முகத்து ஒற்றி"
- (Meaning: The Aali, arriving fiercely enough to make the striped tiger tremble, leaps and strikes the prominent forehead of a tall elephant).*

The characteristics of the animal described in these poems closely align with the natural traits of a lion.

As further evidence, Pallava kings gave significant importance to the lion. They used the 'Nandi flag' and the 'Lion flag' as their royal emblems, and often appended the word 'Simha' (Lion) to their names. Because of this, the Pallavas carved prominent lion-shaped pillars at the base of their structural stone temples (Kattrali), often depicting a smaller elephant beneath the lion's feet. In the later Vijayanagara and Nayak periods, Yali sculptures gained immense prominence. During this time, master sculptors carved various distinct types of Yali figures using their exceptional skills, as noted by biological enthusiast Harihara Chinna and Tamil researcher ga. Sivam.

However, in another Sangam poem, Akananuru 381, the phrase "Aali Nanmaan Anangkudai Yoruthal" appears, which translates to "Aali, the good/divine beast of immense strength."

Due to such differing interpretations and alternative viewpoints from scholars like P. L. Samy, there remains a debate among researchers as to whether the 'Aali' refers strictly to a lion or if it is a mythical, composite creature. Therefore, in the absence of conclusive biological evidence, many historians do not fully accept the theory that the Yali and the lion are identical.

== Gallery ==
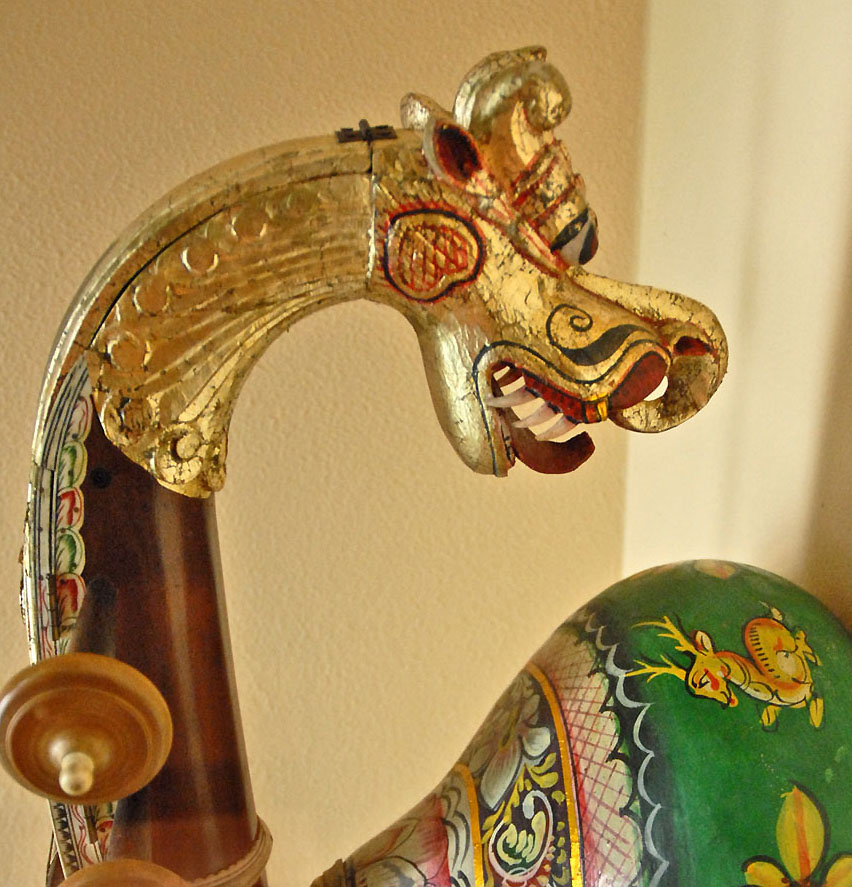
The Yali is often found on the neck of a modern Saraswati veena.

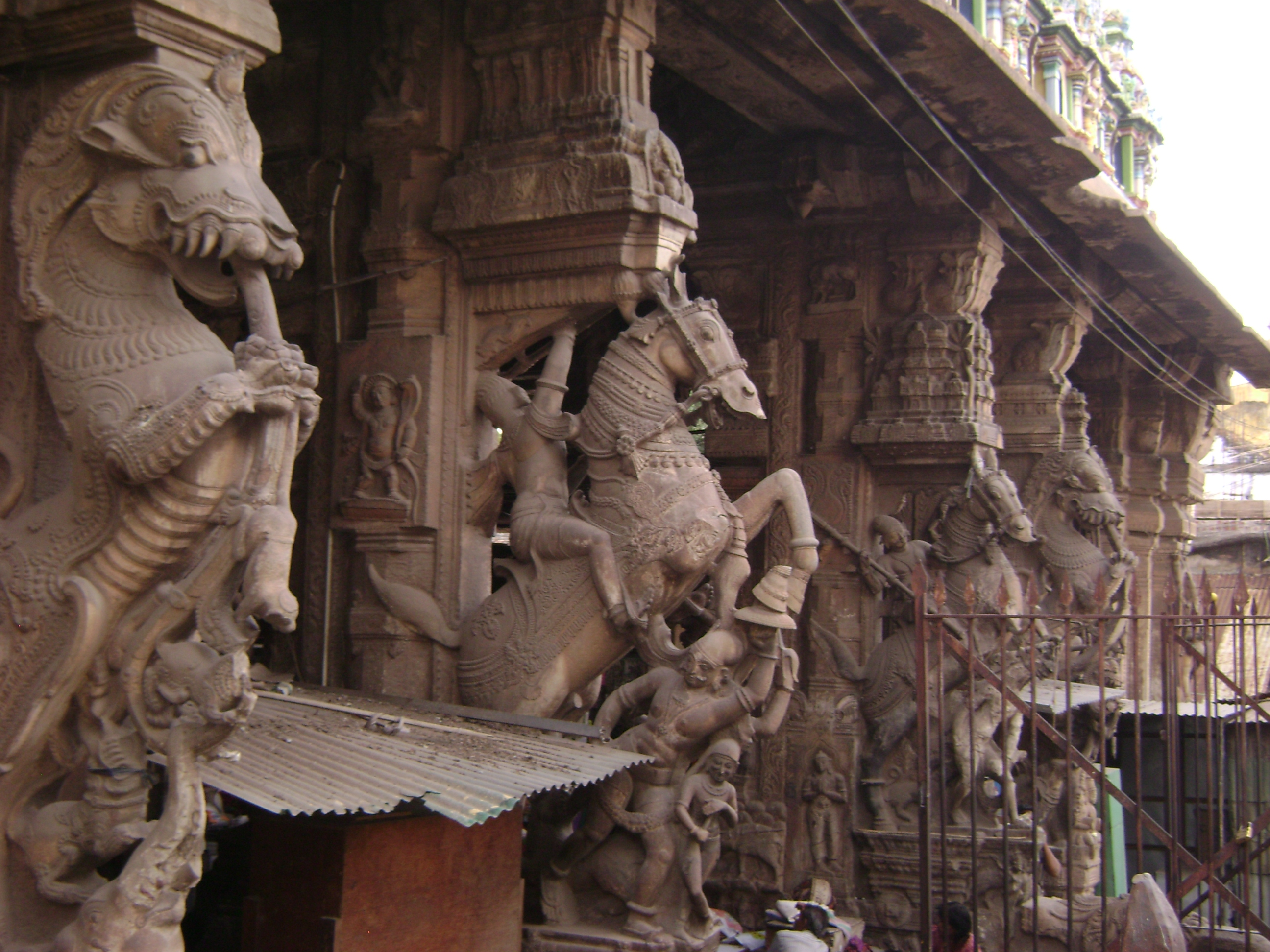
Yali in pillars of Puthu Mandapam, Madurai, Tamil Nadu State, India

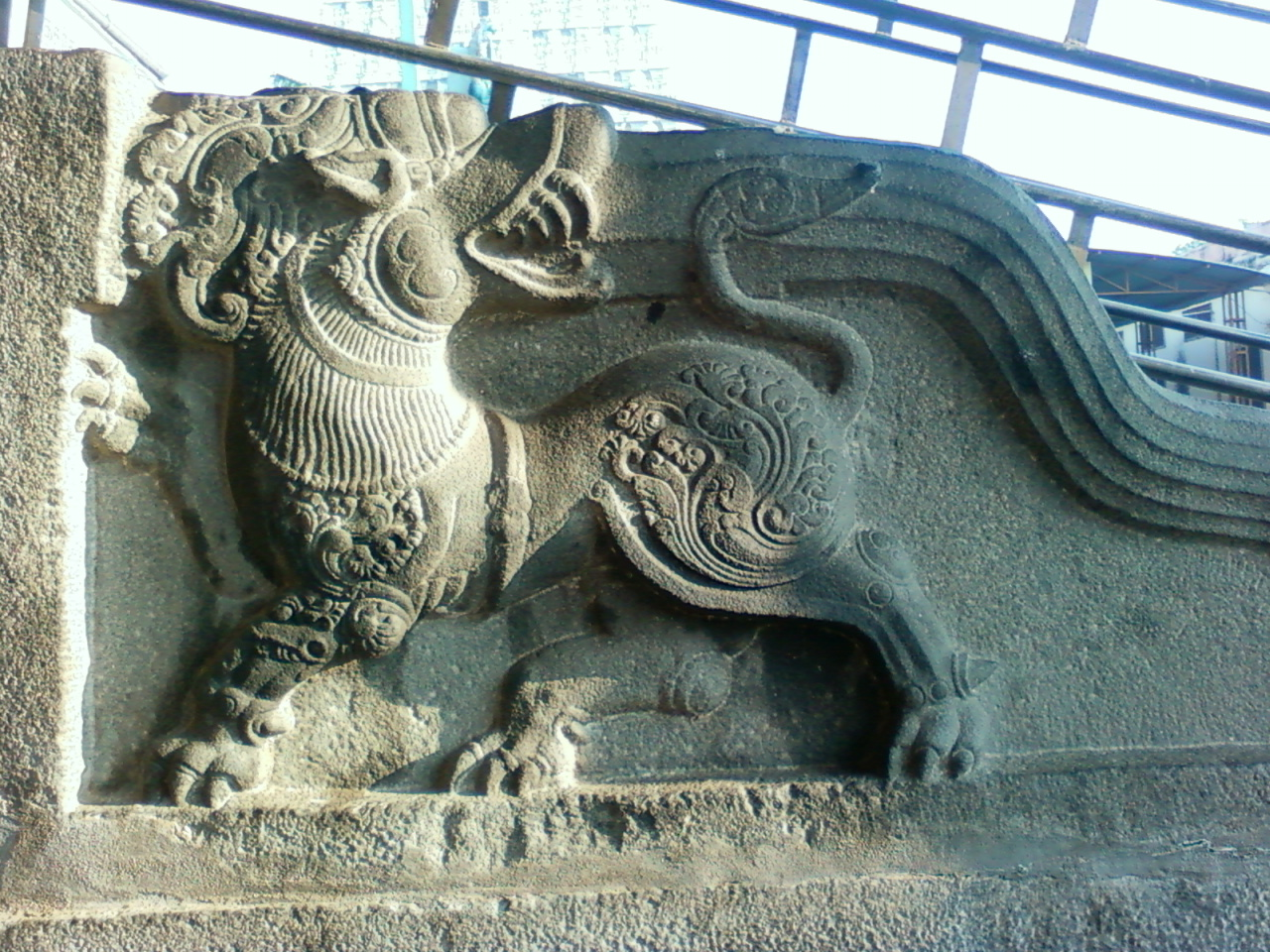
Yali in Thiruvannamalai Annamalaiyar Temple, Tiruvannamalai, Tamil Nadu State, India

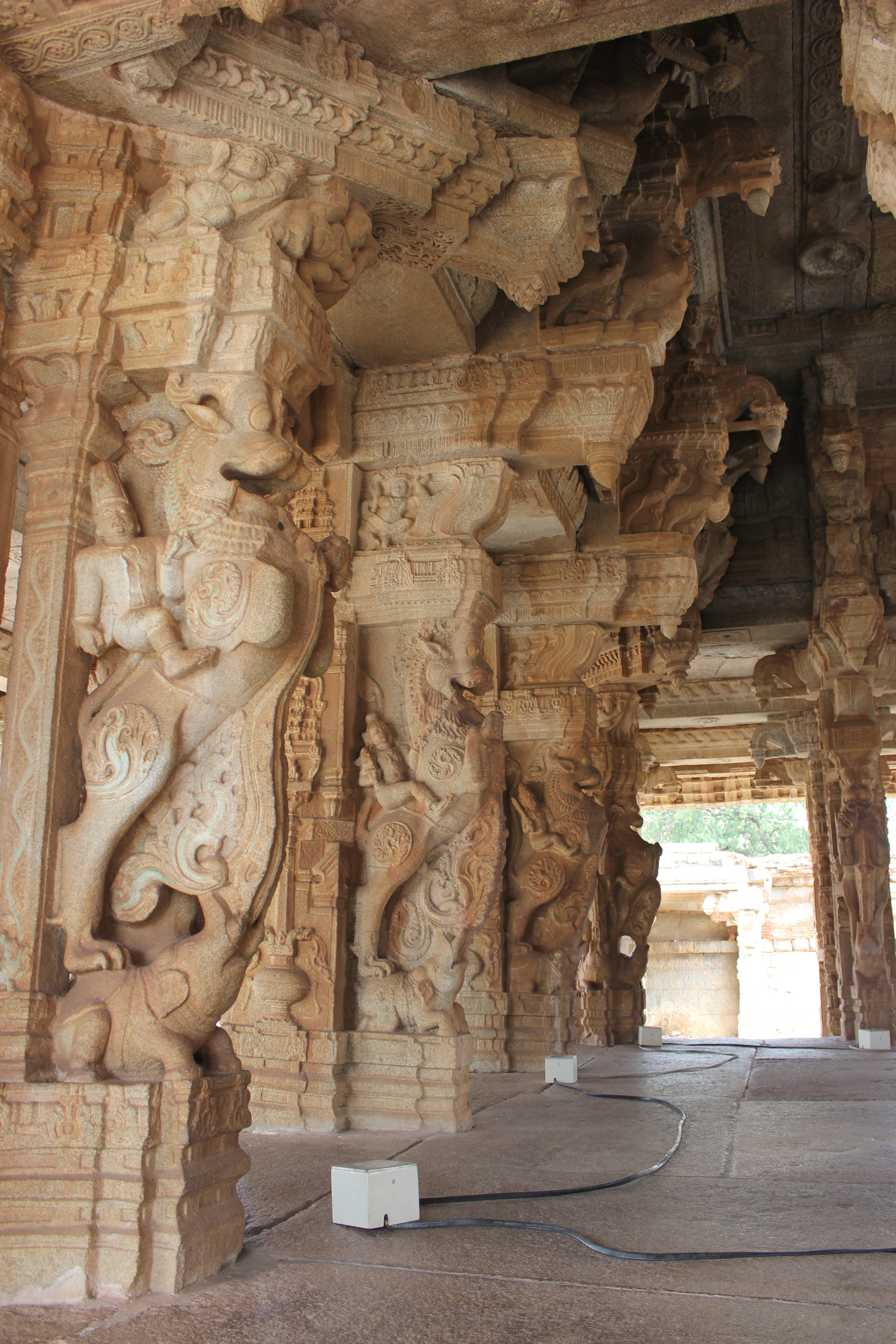
Yali pillars at Vittala temple at Hampi, Karnataka state, India

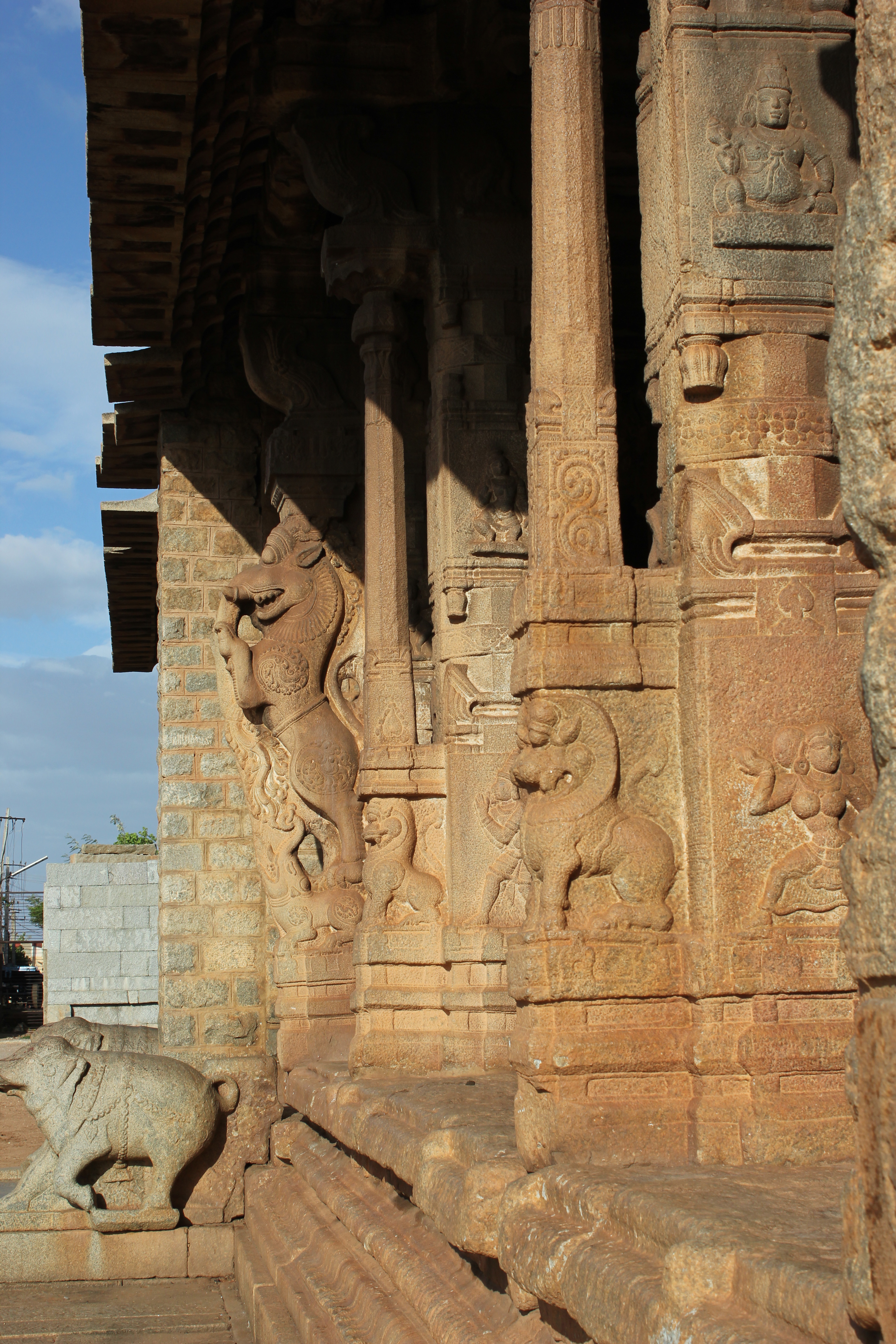
Yali pillars at Ananthasayana temple, Ananthasayanagudi, Karnataka state, India

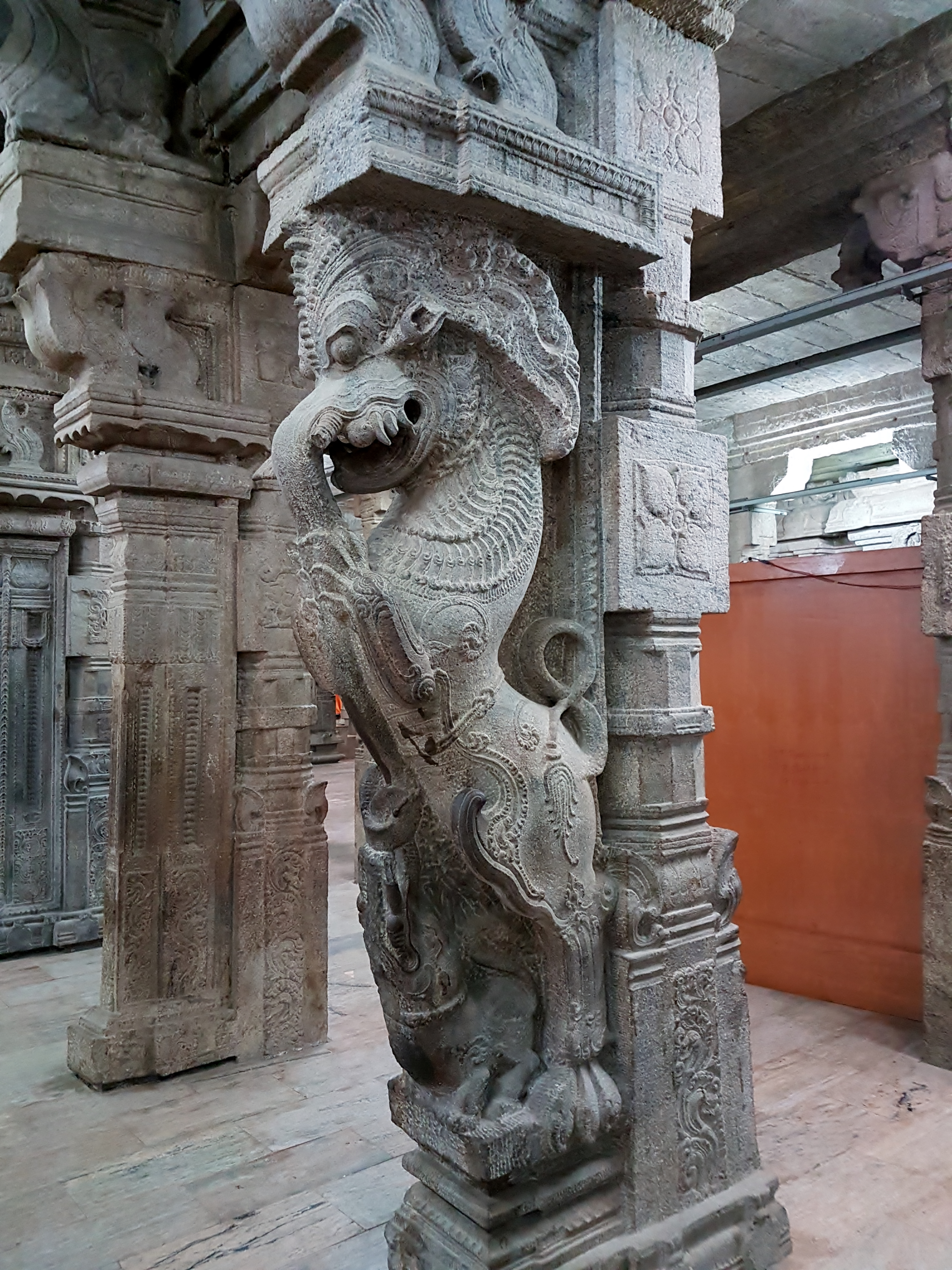
Carved pillar in the 16th century Thousand Pillar Hall, Meenakshi Temple, Madurai

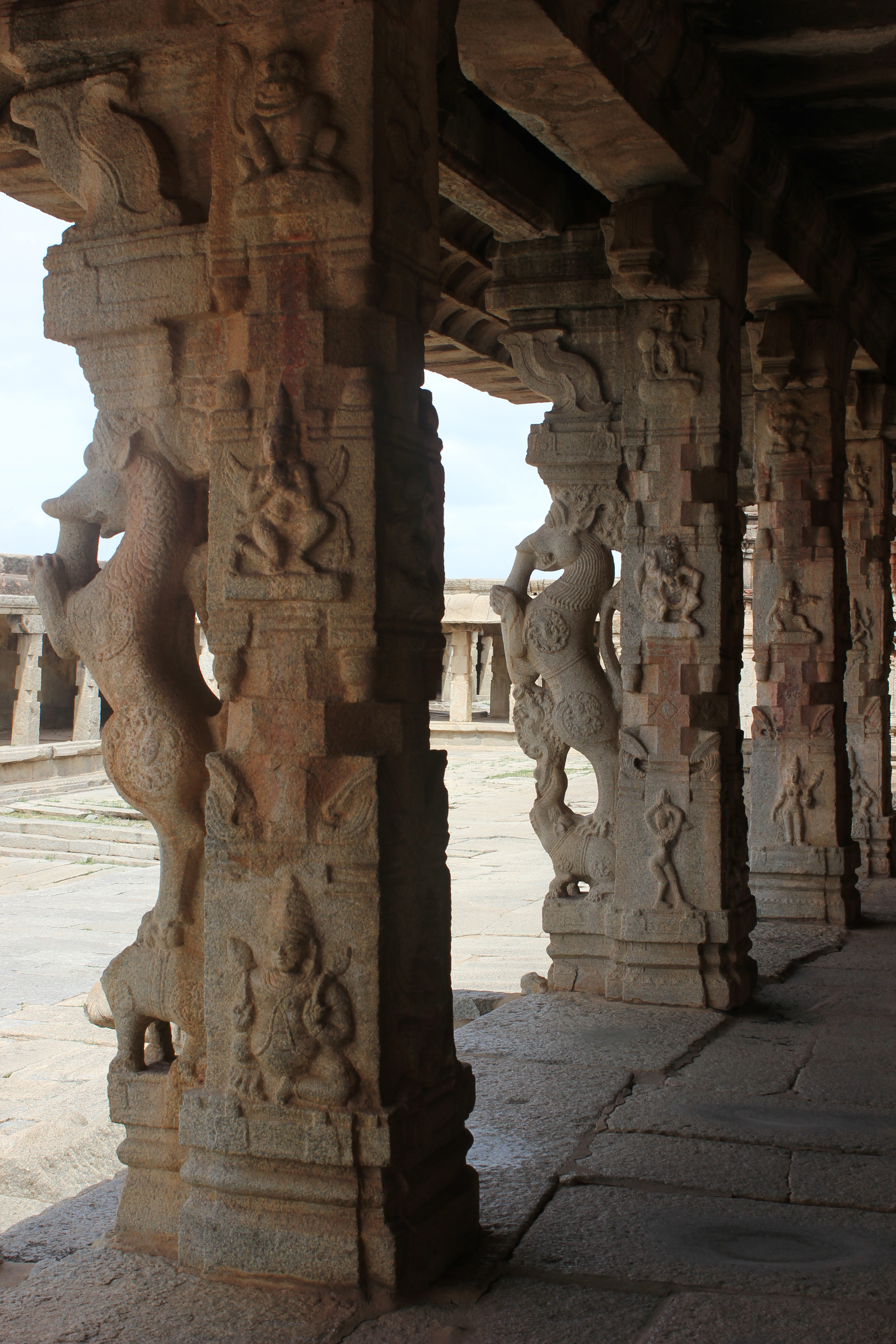
Yali pillars at Krishna temple at Hampi, Karnataka state, India

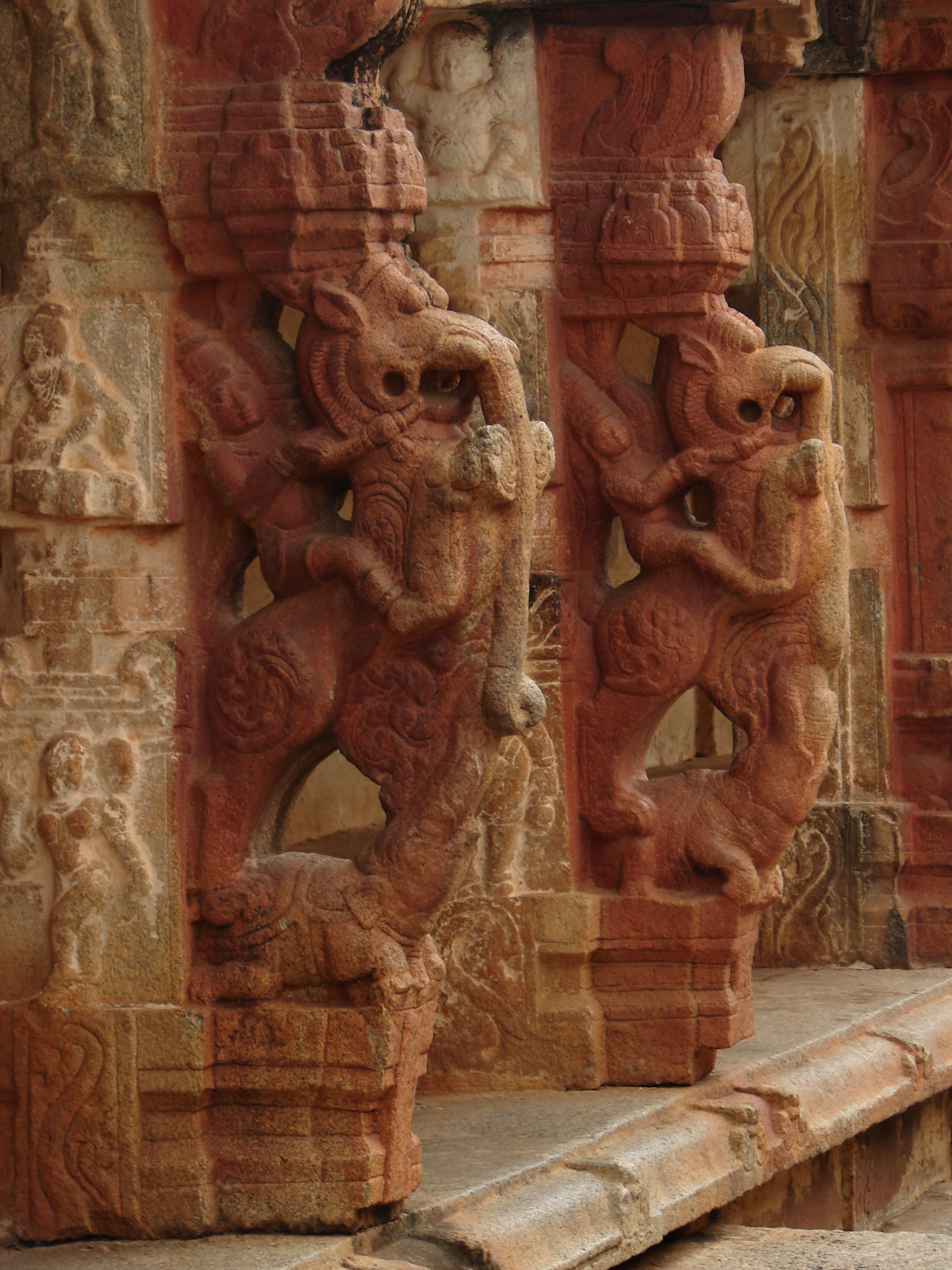
Yali pillars at Bhoganandishvara temple in Chikkaballapur district, Karnataka state, India

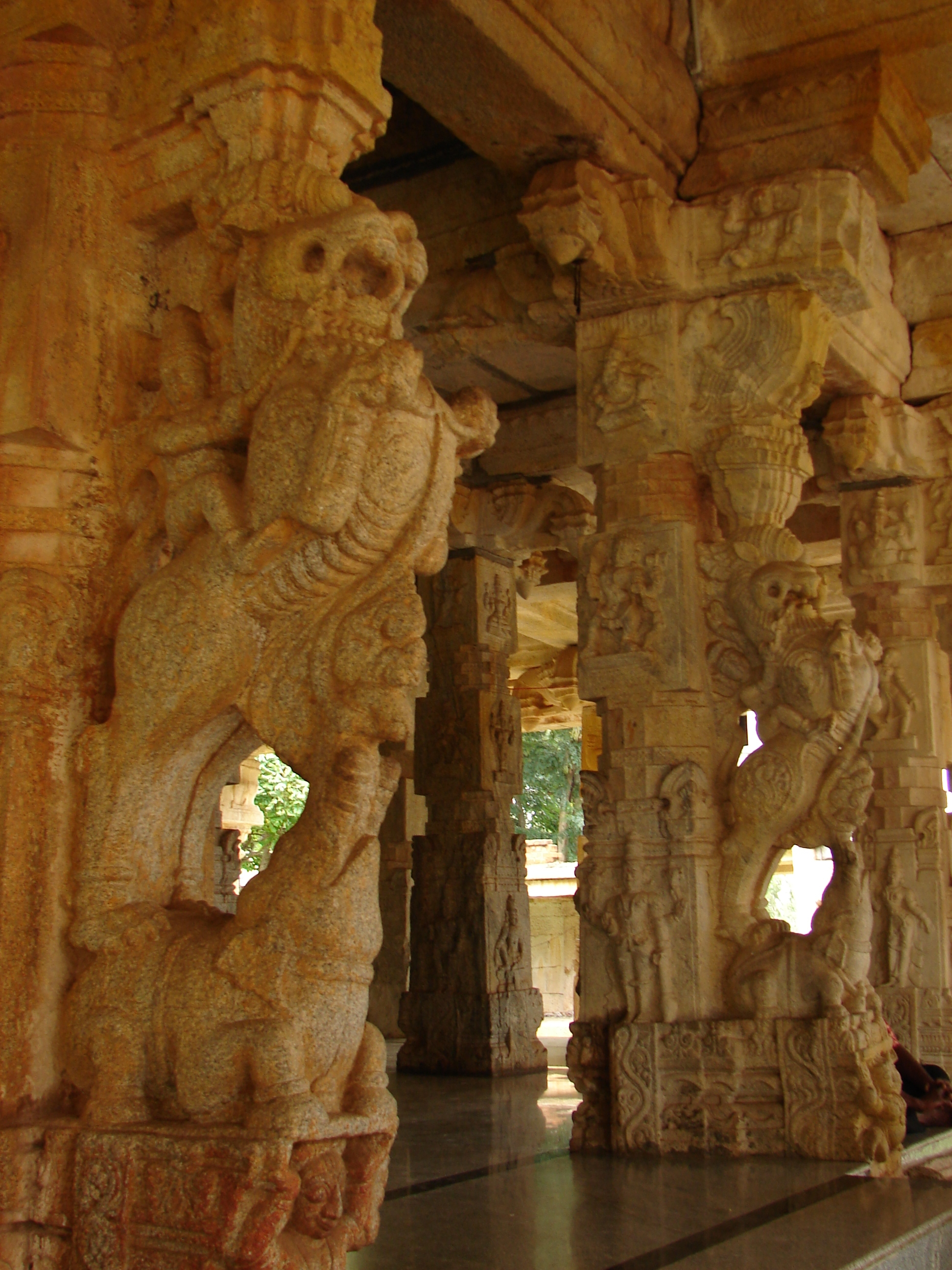
Yali pillars at the Ranganatha temple in Chikkaballapur district, Karnataka state, India

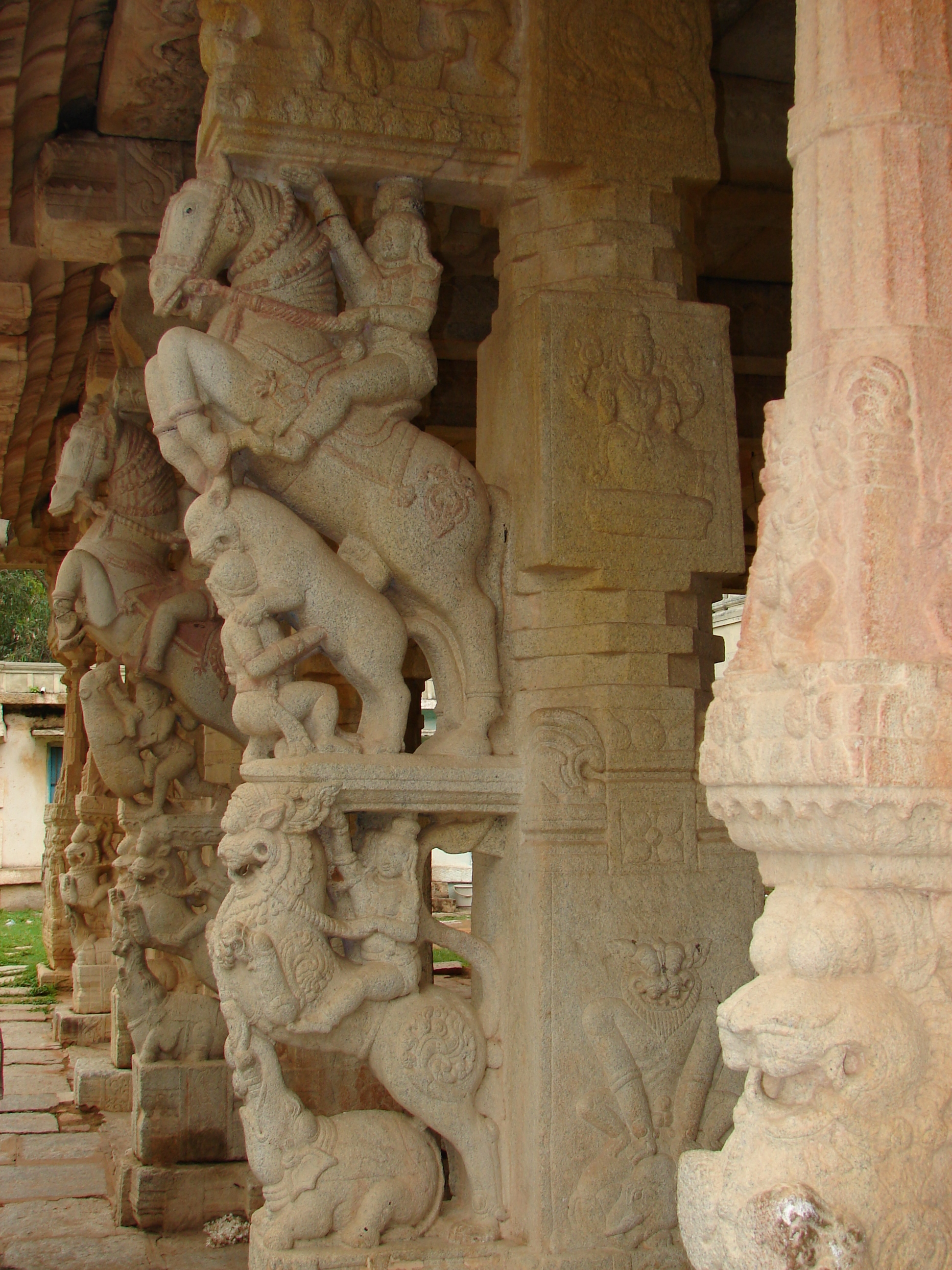
Pillars with Yali and Kudure Gombe ("horse doll") at Ranganatha temple, Rangasthala, Chikkaballapur district, Karnataka state, India

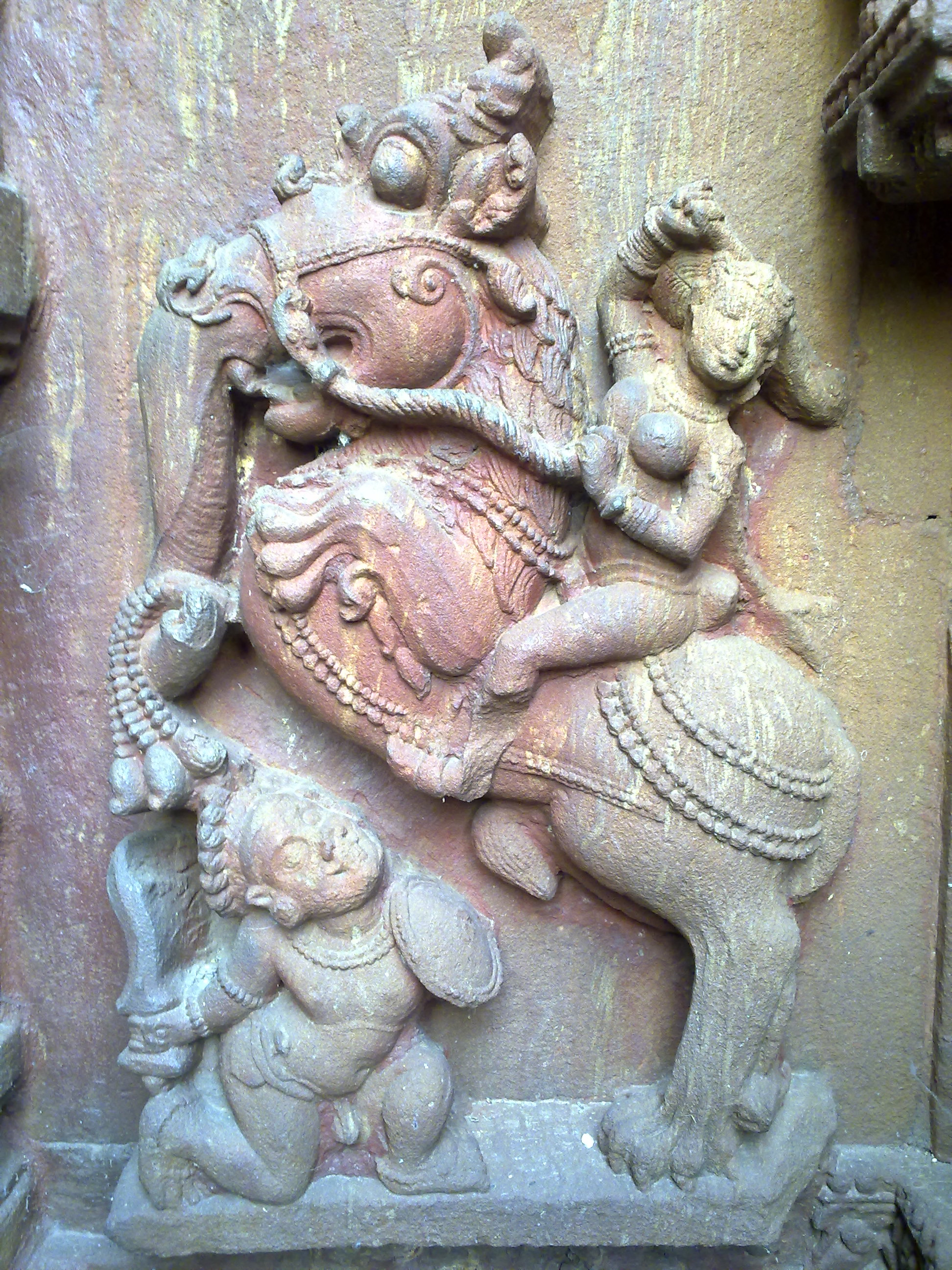
Yali and rider, Mukteshvara Temple, Bhubaneshwar, Odisha state, India

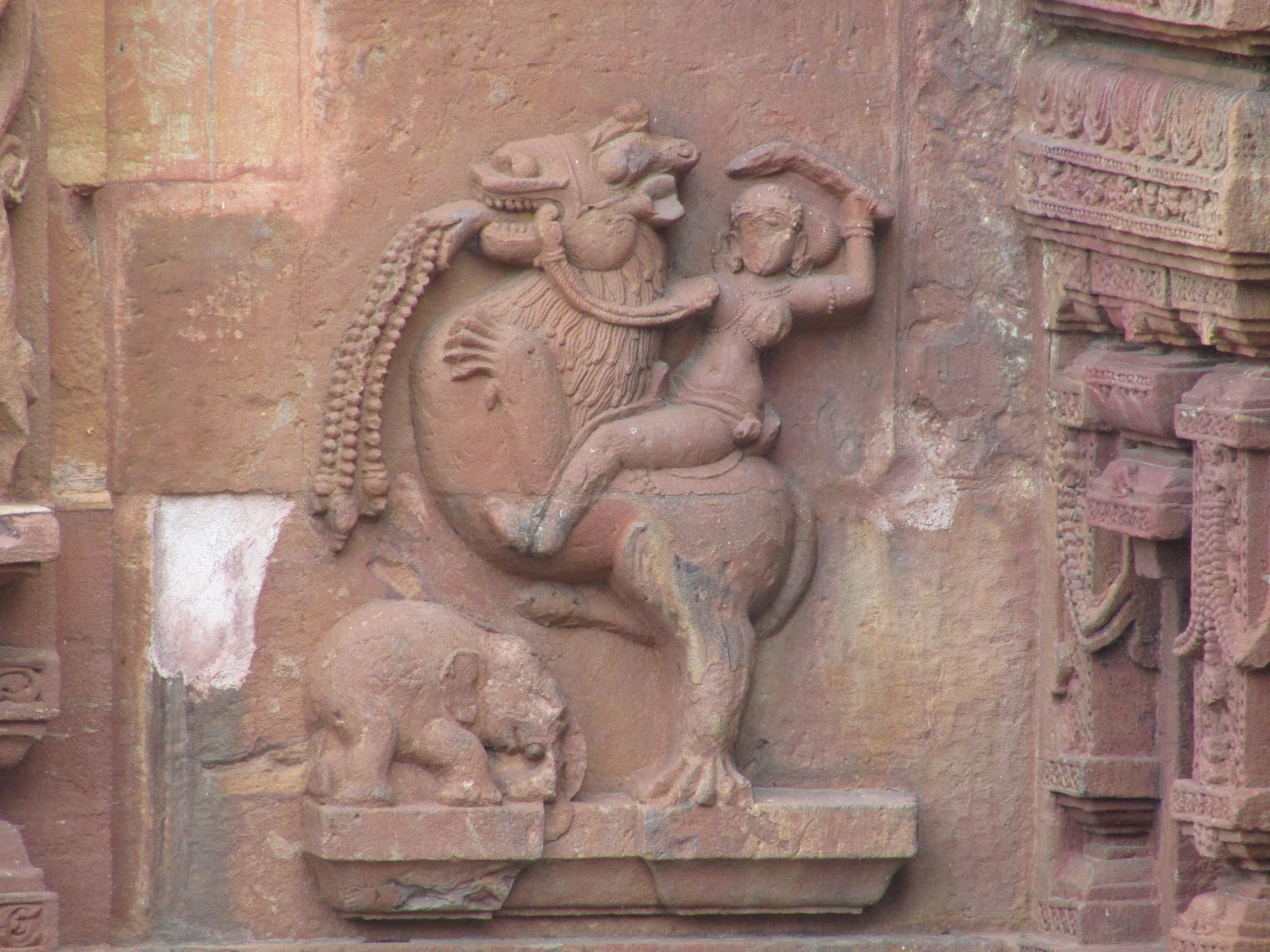
Yali and rider, Mukteshvara Temple, Bhubaneshwar, Odisha state, India

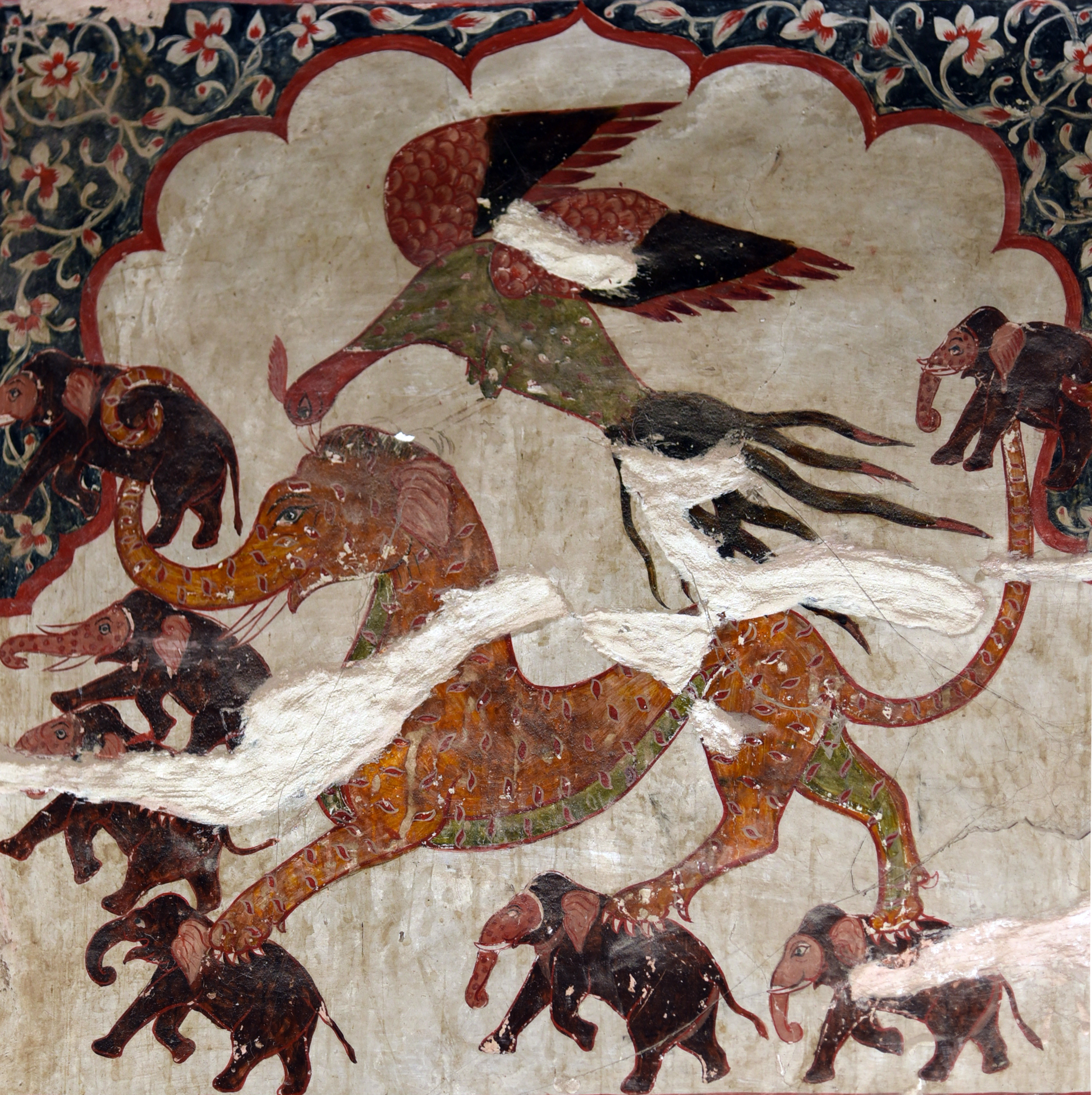
Image of Yali at Orchha fort, Madhya Pradesh, India

== See also ==
- Gandaberunda
- Nawarupa
- Pratyangira
- Sharabha
- Gajasimha
