= There's a Bat in Bunk Five =

1980 young adult novel by Paula Danziger

There’s a Bat in Bunk Five
- First edition
- Author: Paula Danziger
- Language: English
- Genre: Young adult novel
- Publisher: Putnam
- Publication date: 1980
- Publication place: United States
- Media type: Print Paperback
- Pages: 168 pp
- ISBN: 0-698-11689-5
- OCLC: 38998681
- Preceded by: The Cat Ate My Gymsuit

There's a Bat in Bunk Five (1982) is a young adult novel written by Paula Danziger. The book follows the character Marcy from her 1974 book, The Cat Ate My Gymsuit.

== Plot ==
Marcy Lewis finds herself as a counselor in training at the summer camp near Woodstock, New York run by her former English teacher, Ms. Finney, whom Marcy has missed after Ms. Finney had been fired from her job. Marcy not only has to deal with the sudden attentions of Ted, her new boyfriend, but when she has to go to Woodstock he starts hanging out with Betty, who has a crush on Ted. Marcy has lost a lot of weight, and is now being noticed by boys. At the camp, she is put in charge of a group of young girls, whom she is expected to shepherd through the beginnings of adolescence. When she finds a bat in her bunk (bunk five), she is sure that this summer will be a summer to remember for eternity.

She also loves to read and write, and she tried to be Ginger's friend, who only likes Barbara Finney. After various trials and tribulations at the camp, she gets fed up with people letting her down and being mean to her. Then all the girls in Marcy's bunk trick her into thinking there is another bat. She gains confidence that she is not petrified anymore, and then sees that it was a baseball bat, and on the bat is a note reading "August Fool". Once she starts to win over the boys in her cabin, she finds it easier to deal with the various problems that develop at camp.
