= Amber Brown (TV series) =

2022 American television series

- Promotional poster
- Genre: Family; Comedy
- Created by: Bonnie Hunt
- Based on: Amber Brown by Paula Danziger
- Starring: Carsyn Rose; Sarah Drew; Darin Brooks; Liliana Inouye
- Country of origin: United States
- Original language: English
- No. of seasons: 1
- No. of episodes: 10

Production
- Executive producers: Bob Higgins; Bonnie Hunt; Jon Rutherford
- Production companies: Bob & Alice Productions; Boat Rocker Media

Original release
- Network: Apple TV+
- Release: July 29, 2022

Amber Brown is an American family comedy television series based on the book series of the same name by Paula Danziger. It premiered on July 29, 2022, on Apple TV+. In April 2023, the series was canceled after one season.

== Premise ==
Amber Brown is a multi-ethnic girl navigating the typical pitfalls of growing up while dealing with the divorce of her parents.

== Cast ==
- Carsyn Rose as Amber Brown
- Sarah Drew as Sarah Brown
- Darin Brooks as Max
- Liliana Inouye as Brandi Colwin
- Michael Yo as Philip
- Ashley Williams as Aunt Pam
- Beau Hart as Stanley
- Joshua Gallup as Justin
- Luna-Marie Katich as Hannah Burton

== Episodes ==
No.	Title	Directed by	Written by	Original release date
1	"I, Amber Brown"	Bonnie Hunt	Bonnie Hunt	July 29, 2022
2	"What They Don't Know"	Bonnie Hunt	Bonnie Hunt & Nora Sagal	July 29, 2022
3	"No Place Like Two Homes"	Jean Sagal	Bonnie Hunt	July 29, 2022
4	"On a Role"	Jean Sagal	Bonnie Hunt	July 29, 2022
5	"Sound Advice"	Michelle Manning	Bonnie Hunt & Elaine Arata	July 29, 2022
6	"Schooled Dance"	Michelle Manning	Bonnie Hunt & Elaine Arata	July 29, 2022
7	"Comes in Waves"	Rachael Holder	Bonnie Hunt	July 29, 2022
8	"Hollywood Beginning"	Rachael Holder	Bonnie Hunt	July 29, 2022
9	"Love Is Here to Stay"	Jean Sagal	Bonnie Hunt	July 29, 2022
10	"Life"	Michelle Manning	Bonnie Hunt	July 29, 2022

== Production ==
It was announced in September 2021 that Apple TV+ had ordered an adaptation of the Paula Danziger books to the series from Bonnie Hunt who serves as its executive producer. Carsyn Rose was cast in the title role, with Sarah Drew cast as her mother. Michael Yo and Ashley Williams were also revealed as part of the cast, by the cast member Darin Brooks.

Filming for the series took place in Salt Lake City beginning in September 2021. On April 11, 2023, Apple canceled the series after one season.

== Release ==
The series debuted on July 29, 2022.
