= Mythical creatures in Burmese folklore =

Mythology in Burma

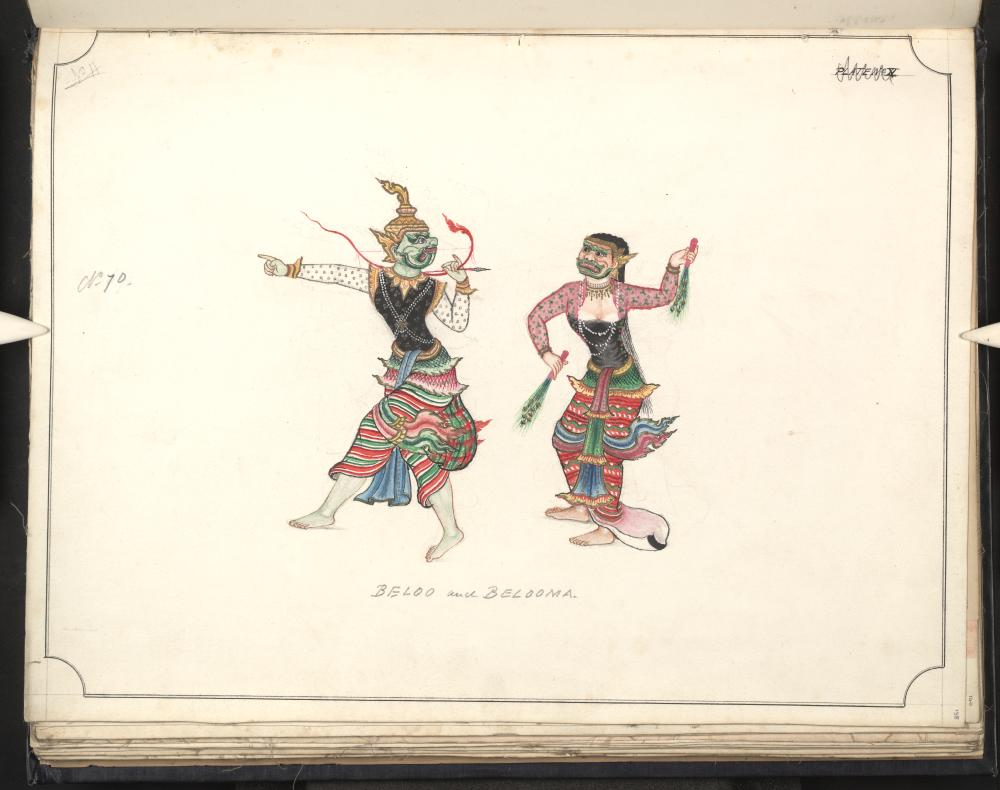
Male and female forms of the Belu, depicted in a 19th-century watercolour

A wide variety of mythical creatures are found in Burmese mythology. Many Burmese creatures are part human or creatures capable of assuming human form. Most mythical creatures are endowed with humanistic mentalities, ability to converse with humans and also supernatural powers. During the 20th century, the role and diversity of Burmese mythical creatures were diversified by Shwe Thway comics which depicted the life of the Buddha, the Jataka tales and Burmese history.

The most common mythological being is the Belu, an ogre. The popularity of the Belu is due to the Yama Zatdaw, the Burmese version of the Ramayana, a very popular play in Myanmar, and also their roles in the Jatakas.

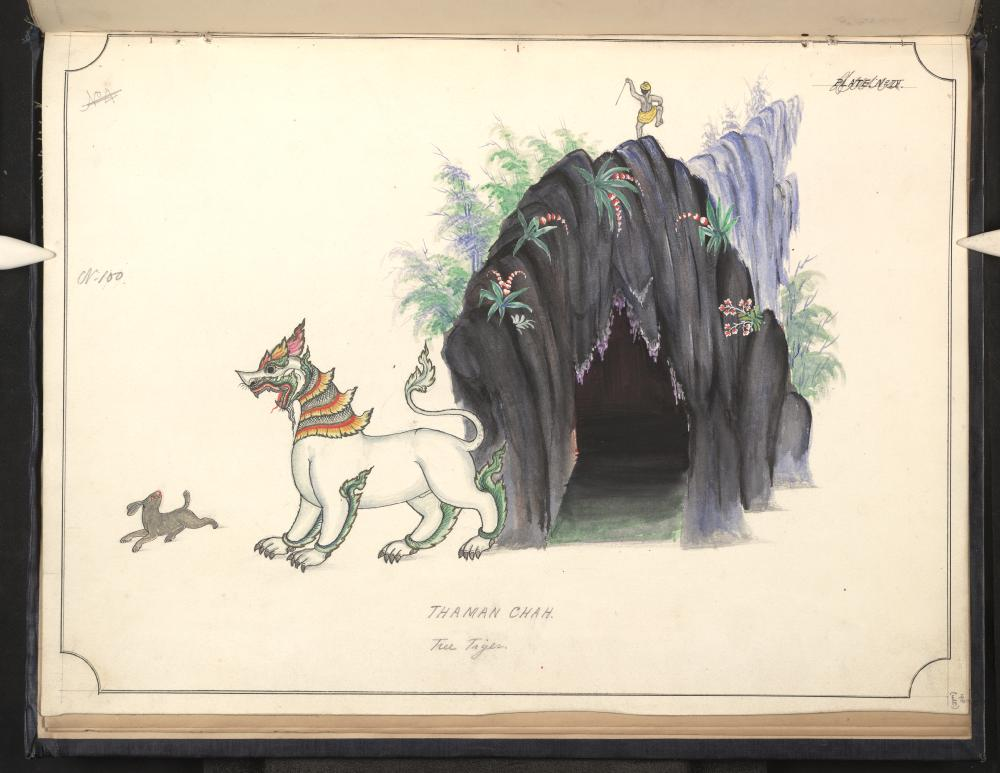
A Thaman Chah or were-tiger, from a 19th-century Burmese watercolour

== List of beings and creatures ==
The following is a list of beings and creatures from Burmese mythology mentioned in stories, plays and Burmese literature:

=== Deities, demons and spirits ===
- Athurakal – the lowest form of deities which have pleasure half the day and suffer the other half. Sworn enemies of the Devas (gods). (Athurakal is an alternative synonym for Asura)
- Belu – usually man-eating demons capable of shapeshifting.
  - Pan-kike Belu – (lit flower biters) Belu with straight fangs which eat humans. Generally malevolent.
  - Panswé Belu – (lit flower danglers) Belu with curved or hooked fangs which eat flowers and fruits. Generally benevolent. An example would be Popa Medaw.
- Nat sein – ghods, spirits of deceased humans (especially those who died violent deaths). They grant supernatural powers to those devoted to them, but are imperceptible in the mortal world.
- Ottsa-saunk or Ottsar-saunk – beings cursed to roam the earth due to their strong attachment to objects or places.
- Thaik nan shin – is synonymous with Otta-saunk, glossed by Spiro as "quasi-nat," or "the spirits who, because of their greed for treasure when they were human, have been assigned to guard the treasures of the Buddha".
- Peik-ta – ghouls, beings punished with perpetual hunger or thirst. (derived from Sanskrit word Preta)
- Sone – hags or witches
- Thayé – ghosts
- Yama Yazar – A saint, often claimed as a death lord who rules Hell. (Derived from Yama-raj, Hindu god of death, hell and afterlife judgement)
- Yetkhat – benevolent guardians of buried treasures and those hidden in tree roots. (derived from Raksha, Hindu mythical demons)
- Zawgyi (alchemist) – a human alchemist with supernatural powers who is often seen with a stick and a red hat.
- Ma Phae Wah – a female ghost who lead the ghosts and rule the graveyards.

=== Beasts ===
==== Birds ====
- Galone – Garuda the archbird, nemesis of the serpents Nāgas.
- Hintha – Hamsa the Brahmin bird, famed as the bird with most pleasant voice; symbol of the Mon people, Mon State and Bago Region.
- Karaweik – from the Pali "karavika", a bird with a melodious cry.

==== Reptiles ====
- Magan – Makara, a crocodile-like sea monster with prehensile snout.
- Nāga – dragon-like serpents with great powers, enemies of the Garudas, and who inhabit the sea. They are described as being able to swim through the earth as if it was water, and fly in the sky. According to the Bhuridatta Jataka the 6th of the 10 last lives of the Buddha, the Buddha was a Nāga prince. In Burmese legend, Nāga's angry side eye can burn their enemies to ashes.
- Ngamoeyeik – a super giant crocodile and character of Min Nandar and Shin Hmwe Loon, the Burmese equivalent of Romeo and Juliet.
- Shuu Pyan – a giant beast from Pyusawhti story, who looks like a western dragon.

==== Mammals ====
- Kyut – malevolent pangolin or armadillo like creatures which can assume human form and trick humans in the barren forests.
- Sarmaree – vain long-haired yak which values its hair.
- Chinthe – the lion, commonly depicted in architecture as a guardian, and associated with myths and legends.
- Thaman Kyah – the weretiger, somewhat equivalent to werewolf in European cultures.
- Shwe Thamin – a golden deer.

==== Spiders ====
- Giant Spider of Pindaya – a giant spider which held 7 princesses captive in Pindaya region.

==== Hybrids ====
- Byala – Rakhine version of the Nawa Rupa. A creature with nine hybrid features.
- Kinnara, male and Kinnari, female – a hybrid of human and bird, often painted as humans with wings in clothing and headdresses; associated with the Shan and Kayah States.
- Manotethiha (Manussiha in Pali) – Sphinx-like half-human, half-lion creatures. Their appearances are somewhat similar to sphinxes. What separates them from sphinxes is that they have two lion bodies connected to a single human head.
- Nawarupa – (lit nine features); a creature made from the amalgamation of parts of nine different animals.
- Nāya/ Toe-nāya/ Toe-nāga – quite similar to chimera; hybrids of seven animals including Nāga. No appearance of these creatures is found in mythology. They are artistic designs of a nāga developed by early Myanmar sculptor.
- Pyinsarupa – (lit five features); a creature made from the amalgamation of parts of five different animals, mascot of Myanmar Airways International.
- Yay Thu Ma – mermaid.

== See also ==
- Buddhist mythology
- Buddhist cosmology
- Buddhism in Myanmar
- Culture of Burma
