= The Cat Ate My Gymsuit =

1974 book by Paula Danziger

- First edition
- Author: Paula Danziger
- Language: English
- Genre: Young adult novel
- Publisher: Delacorte Books
- Publication date: 1974
- Publication place: United States
- Media type: Print Paperback
- Pages: 160 pp
- ISBN: 0-14-240654-6
- OCLC: 67616260
- Followed by: There's a Bat in Bunk Five

The Cat Ate My Gymsuit (1974) is a young adult novel written by Paula Danziger.

== Plot ==
Ninth-grader Marcy Lewis is a smart and sensitive girl who nevertheless lacks confidence. Being plus-sized, she is embarrassed to draw attention to herself, and she is failing gym class due to her reluctance to change clothes in front of the other girls (resulting in numerous creative excuses for why she doesn't have her gym clothes, such as the titular "the cat ate my gymsuit"). Her verbally abusive father Martin belittles and criticizes the entire family, while her nervous mother Lily encourages her daughter to ignore his behavior and try not to set him off, leading to Marcy's inability to talk about how she really feels.

When her English teacher leaves his job, Marcy's English class receives a new teacher, Ms. Finney. Ms. Finney is a creative and challenging free-thinker who encourages the class to analyze their emotional reactions, leading them to create a school club called Smedley, where they are encouraged to consider not only their feelings, but those of others. Through Smedley, Marcy begins to make new friends and starts to learn to stand up for how she feels. However, her father dislikes Marcy's new assertiveness, while the school administration dislikes Ms. Finney's unorthodox teaching style. Finally, Ms. Finney is dismissed on the grounds that she refuses to say the Pledge of Allegiance.

Marcy and her friends from Smedley start a protest against Ms. Finney's dismissal until the principal, Mr. Stone, suspends the whole group. To Marcy's surprise, her mother, who is the president of the PTA, takes Marcy's side against both the school administration and Marcy's father, who is furious that Marcy got herself suspended for what, to him, seems a trivial reason. The entire school—students, parents, and administration alike—are divided over Ms. Finney's firing, with the parents forcing their children to end friendships with each other over the disagreement. The children, however, refuse to go along with this.

Ms. Finney brings a legal case against her firing, with some of her former students speaking in her defense in court. The court determines that the school administration had no legal grounds to fire her, because it is unconstitutional to force her to recite the Pledge. The school board reluctantly reinstates her, but Ms. Finney, realising that her return would only continue to divide the community, declines to return. Marcy and her friends feel betrayed, but come to understand her reasons. The class gets a new, more conventional English teacher, and Ms. Finney finds a new job as a therapist elsewhere.

In the aftermath, Marcy comes to the conclusion that she and her father are simply too different to ever be close, and that while she can never change her father as he is irredeemable, she can continue to try to change herself. Her mother also learns this lesson and decides to take night classes at the local college in order to improve and fulfill herself. Marcy finds that the friends she made during their struggle to save Ms. Finney continue to be supportive, and she is even surprised to learn that the crush she has on one of the boys is requited.

== Inspiration ==
The most recent edition of the book has an afterword by Danziger explaining why she initially wrote the book and why it is still relevant today.

The title of the book comes from one of the many excuses that Marcy offers to her gym teacher, named Ms. Schmidt, but she called her just Schmidt, such as "the cat ate my gymsuit" to get out of physical education classes.

== Sequel ==
Followed by There's a Bat in Bunk Five.
