= Tara Ghassemieh =

Iranian-American dancer

Tara Ghassemieh is an American ballerina. She was a principal dancer at the Golden State Ballet, the first of Iranian descent. A member of the Iranian diaspora, she has protested the Iranian government, which made ballet illegal after the 1979 revolution.

== Early life ==
Ghassemieh was born in California to an American mother and Iranian father. Her father had left Iran shortly before the Iranian Revolution.

== Career ==
Ghassemieh is a principal dancer at the Golden State Ballet, and has called herself the first Iranian-American principal ballet dancer.

She has protested the Iranian government on social media, centering on the argument of women's rights and that ballet was made illegal in Iran after the 1979 revolution.

== The White Feather ==
Ghassemieh is the creator of The White Feather, a two-act dance about artistic freedom in Iran and the Iranian National Ballet Company. The ballet follows a young Iranian girl, Taherah, who wants to be a ballerina.

In addition to dance, the piece also uses spoken word and projections of historical films of Iran.
