= Snail Mail No More =

2000 book by Ann M. Martin

- First edition
- Author: Paula Danziger and Ann M. Martin
- Language: English
- Genre: Children novel
- Publisher: Scholastic Press
- Publication date: 2000
- Publication place: United States
- Media type: Print (Hardback & Paperback)
- ISBN: 0-340-74432-4
- OCLC: 756790713

Snail Mail No More is a book published in 2000 by Paula Danziger and Ann M. Martin. It is the sequel to P.S. Longer Letter Later about the relationship between two long-distance friends, Elizabeth and Tara. Similar to their previous book in the series, Snail Mail No More was written by the authors through responses to each other's emails.

== Plot ==
After a year of communicating via mail, long-distance friends Elizabeth Richardson and Tara*Starr Lane begin corresponding by email. Now in eighth grade, the girls exchange messages about changes in their lives and continue to develop their friendship.

Tara*Starr is getting used to having a baby sister, Scarlett, who was born prematurely and becomes a source of worry to the family, and trying to understand how a social studies project ruined her relationship with her boyfriend, Bart.

Meanwhile, Elizabeth's father has returned, much to the disappointment of Elizabeth's family. However, the family is deeply affected when Elizabeth's father is killed in a car crash. Elizabeth comes to realize that a chapter of her life has closed, but another is still beginning. In the process, the girls' friendship improves, despite their distance.

== Reception ==
Mary Harris Russell of the Chicago Tribune praised the book's handling of societal issues within the story, stating "the mixture of frothy and heavy topics will be attractive to young readers who couldn't bear either all crisis or all party talk". The Daily Telegraph noted the book was "very American in attitude...but enough of a story to keep the interest up."
