= P.S. Longer Letter Later =

Book by Paula Danziger

- First edition
- Author: Paula Danziger and Ann M. Martin
- Language: English
- Genre: Children novel
- Publisher: Scholastic
- Publication date: 1998
- Publication place: United States
- Media type: Print (Hardback & Paperback)
- OCLC: 36884152

P.S. Longer Letter Later is an epistolary novel written by Paula Danziger and Ann M. Martin in 1998. It is a novel in letters and is written as a year-long correspondence between two twelve-year-old girls, Tara (styled Tara*Starr) and Elizabeth. The novel was followed by a sequel, Snail Mail No More.

The novel was developed with Danziger writing as Tara and Martin as Elizabeth. The writing styles of the authors' individual works are reflected in the styles for Tara (whose voice resembles Danzinger's Amber Brown books) and Elizabeth (whose writing is similar to Baby-sitters Club books). In a radio interview, the authors said that as they developed the story together, their own friendship was tested like that of their characters.

== Plot ==
Tara is outgoing and impulsive and likes to write, while Elizabeth is shy, quiet and prefers writing poetry and also has to deal with an emotionally abusive father. Even so, they are best friends.

When Tara moves to Ohio, the girls continue their friendship through letters back and forth to each other. They have to do this by writing, because Elizabeth's father does not like Tara, and Tara's parents think it is expensive to talk on the phone. The letters detail the changes in their lives – Tara must cope with moving, making new friends and dealing with her mother's pregnancy, while Elizabeth's family begins to fall apart. Tara makes another best friend in Ohio, whose name is Hannah. Tara calls her Pal Indrome because her name is the same spelled backwards as forwards. It becomes her new nickname and everyone calls her "Pal". Tara also gets a boyfriend, Alex, who kisses her.

Elizabeth's father starts to scare her when he is coming home later than usual, drinking, and going overboard on his credit cards after he loses his job and has no money. Meanwhile Tara is making new friends, joining clubs and getting involved in school activities. When Elizabeth's family has to move to an apartment because of money problems, her dad decides to leave, and separates from her mother.

It is through their alternating letters that readers learn how Tara and Elizabeth grow and change – and how they keep their friendship strong, even if it is long-distance. This book shows how hard a friendship can be when a person can't see her friend, but suggests that for someone who truly cares about something and works hard for it, anything can happen.

== Reviews ==
The Denver Post called it a "classic example of an Odd Couple collaboration", given the mismatch of the characters and their writing styles. Publishers Weekly assessed it as "strikingly insightful".

Boston Globe included it in a shortlist of books recommended to help children cope with the uncertainty of moving house.
