= Tara Stevens =

British journalist

- Born: 10 September 1972 (age 53); London, England, United Kingdom
- Occupations: Journalist and author
- Writing career
- Subjects: Cuisine, travel, photography

Tara Stevens (born 10 September 1972) is a British journalist of Welsh extraction, based in Barcelona and specializing in cuisine.

== Life ==
Tara Stevens' work focuses on the journalism of cuisine, and is regarded as especially important in terms of both the subtly and depth of its observation. She has been a regular contributor for the English-speaking Barcelona Metropolitan magazine; co-authored the Insight Guide Barcelona Smart Guide; contributed to Suzanne Wales' guide book, Night+Day Barcelona., and contributed to National Geographic Travel and Cultures Traveler magazine.

Stevens has published widely, and in September 2010 her cookbook Clock Book: Recipes from a Modern Moroccan Kitchen was released. She is thought to be currently working on a book concerned with the dark side of cuisine.
