= Tara Hudiburg =

American forest scientist

- Education: Ph.D, M.S. Oregon State University. B.S. Pacific Lutheran University
- Awards: PECASE 2019, NSF CAREER 2018
- Scientific career
- Fields: Forestry and Ecosystem Modeling
- Workplaces: University of Idaho College of Natural Resources
- Website: https://www.uidaho.edu/cnr/faculty/hudiburg

Tara W. Hudiburg is an American forest scientist who specializes in ecosystem modeling. She is an associate professor at the University of Idaho in the department of Forest, Rangeland and Fire Sciences. Hudiburg was honored with the Presidential Early Career Award for Scientists and Engineers in 2019.

== Early life and education ==
Hudiburg attended Pacific Lutheran University in Tacoma, Washington, graduating in 1998 with a bachelor's degree in biology. Following that, she attended Oregon State University where she graduated in 2008 with a M.S. in Forest Science. She then continued at Oregon State University earning a Ph.D. in Forest Science in 2012. Hudiburg's Ph.D. work centered on biofuel production from forests in the pacific northwest. She measured the greenhouse gas emissions from harnessing certain biofuels. This work was completed with Oregon State University professor Beverly Law. Hudiburg credits some of her early interest in forestry to her love of climbing trees as a child.

== Career and research ==
Hudiburg began her post-doctoral research at the University of Illinois where she focused on the impact of global warming on forests. She was then hired by the University of Idaho in 2014 where she still resides as an associate professor in the department of Forest, Rangeland and Fire Sciences in the College of Natural Resources. The National Science Foundation awarded Hudiburg with a career award and research grant of roughly $650,000 in 2016. With this grant, Hudiburg will research the relationship between forests and the atmosphere in our changing climate, specifically relating to droughts and fires. This research has a planned timeline of five years. In 2018, Hudiburg received a $750,000 grant in order to conduct a study on biofuel sustainability. The study focuses on three crops and their viability as a source of fuel in comparison to fossil fuels. The study uses a process called biogeochemical modeling. Hudiburg conducts much of her forestry research on Moscow mountain as well as in the University of Idaho's experimental forest. This research is then often used in Hudiburg's ecosystem modeling lab at the university which works to understand the relationships between changing environments.

Hudiburg is also a researcher for the MILES (Managing Idaho's Landscapes for Ecosystem Services) program. This project measures human impact on the environment, and how it alters ecosystem services and their value. Hudiburg's official title in this project is Social Ecological Systems Researcher.

Hudiburg also takes her knowledge of forestry to undergraduate students as well as high school teachers in order to educate more on the topic and gain data for her research.

In 2019, the Presidential Early Career Award for Scientists and Engineers (PECASE) was awarded to Hudiburg. This award is earned by scientists who are beginning their individual science careers with exceptional work. She earned this award through her study of forestry and the relationships between forests and their carbon intake. Hudiburg found links between forest type and residence time of carbon in these forests, which are critical in understanding future carbon sequestration tactics to reduce climate change. Hudiburg works to increase information available to the general public and governments, so that educated climate-related decisions can be made at all levels.

=== Publications ===
The following are Hudiburg's highest cited publications on google scholar.

- Carbon dynamics of Oregon and Northern California forests and potential land‐based carbon storage
- Regional carbon dioxide implications of forest bioenergy production
- Altered dynamics of forest recovery under a changing climate
- Impacts of a 32-billion-gallon bioenergy landscape on land and fossil fuel use in the US
- Cost of abating greenhouse gas emissions with cellulosic ethanol

== Awards and honors ==
- Presidential Early Career Award for Scientists and Engineers
- National Science Foundation Faculty Early Career Development Award
