= Amber Brown (book series) =

Series of books for children

- Cover artwork of Amber Brown Is Not a Crayon, the first title in the series
- Amber Brown Is Not a Crayon; You Can't Eat Your Chicken Pox, Amber Brown; Amber Brown Goes Fourth; Amber Brown Wants Extra Credit; Forever Amber Brown; Amber Brown Sees Red; Amber Brown Is Feeling Blue; I, Amber Brown; Amber Brown Is Green With Envy; What a Trip, Amber Brown (A is for Amber); It's Justin Time, Amber Brown (A is for Amber); Get Ready for Second Grade, Amber Brown (A is for Amber); Orange You Glad It's Halloween, Amber Brown? (A is for Amber); It's a Fair Day, Amber Brown (A is for Amber); Second Grade Rules, Amber Brown (A is for Amber); Amber Brown is Tickled Pink; Amber Brown is On the Move; Amber Brown Horses Around
- Author: Paula Danziger, Tony Ross (illustrator, all titles) Bruce Coville (revival), Elizabeth Levy (revival)
- Illustrator: Paula Danziger
- Cover artist: Paula Danziger
- Country: United States
- Language: English
- Genre: Children's literature, realistic fiction
- Published: 1994-2003 (original), 2012-2015 (revival)

Amber Brown is a series of realistic fiction books for children created and originally written by Paula Danziger; later written by Elizabeth Levy and Bruce Coville. Early editions are illustrated by Tony Ross and later by Anthony Lewis. The original series is narrated in first person by a nine-year-old Amber Brown, starting near the end of her third grade and through the summer after her fourth grade while turning ten.

== Synopsis ==
Amber Brown is Not a Crayon begins the series sometime after her mother and father have separated. Amber's mother now dates a man named Max and Amber's father pursues a new job in Paris. At the same time, Amber's lifelong best friend, Justin Daniels, finds out that his family is moving from New Jersey to Alabama. The separation and the tribulations of getting caught in the middle of divorced parents set the foundation for the remainder of the series.

A series of picture books for young readers titled A is for Amber was also published by Danziger with illustrations by Ross and featured adventures with Amber and Justin before Justin moved away and before Amber's parents divorced but after they are already regularly arguing.

== Release ==
Audiobook releases of installments in the series are available, published by Live Oak Media and read by Dana Lubotsky. The recording of the A is for Amber series feature original music and sound effects.

The series was originally inspired by Danziger's real-life niece, Carrie Danziger, shortly after both of her best friends moved away in the same summer. While Amber was a creative conglomeration of Paula Danziger's design, aspects of Carrie's life were used throughout the series. The second title, You Can't Eat Your Chicken Pox, Amber Brown, was inspired by the Danziger girls going to England together and Carrie getting chicken pox. Ross also used Carrie as the model for the original illustration of Amber.

The series originally ended in 2004 with the death of the author Paula Danziger. In 2012, a new title in the series, Amber Brown is Tickled Pink, was announced. Written by popular children's authors Bruce Coville and Elizabeth Levy, whom Danziger described as her closest friends, the new title was released on September 13, 2012. Tony Ross returned as the illustrator for this installment. Two additional titles were released in 2013 and 2014. The second new title, Amber Brown is On the Move, was released on September 12, 2013, and a final title, Amber Brown Horses Around, was released in 2014. Anthony Lewis replaced Ross as the illustrator of the final two books. The idea to revive the series originated with Danziger's agent, Amy Berkower.

Amber Brown Is Not a Crayon: The Graphic Novel was published on May 21, 2024, and It's SNOT Funny, Amber Brown: The Graphic Novel, an adaptation of You Can't Eat Your Chicken Pox, Amber Brown, is set to be published on January 26, 2027. Both books are adapted and illustrated by Victoria Ying.

== Adaptation ==
A television adaptation of Amber Brown was released on Apple TV+ on July 29, 2022. The series is produced by Boat Rocker with Bonnie Hunt as writer, executive producer and showrunner. The series stars Carsyn Rose as Amber Brown and Sarah Drew as Amber’s mother, Sarah Brown. Darin Brooks, and Lillana Inouye were also attached. In the television series, Amber Brown is biracial. In April 2023, it was announced that the series was cancelled after one season.
