= Paula Danziger =

American children's book author

- Born: August 18, 1944; Washington, D.C., US
- Died: July 8, 2004 (aged 59); New York City, US
- Resting place: Woodstock Artist Cemetery, Woodstock, New York, US
- Education: Montclair State University
- Writing career
- Years active: 1974–2004
- Notable works: The Cat Ate My Gymsuit; the Amber Brown series

Paula Danziger (August 18, 1944 – July 8, 2004) was an American children's author who wrote more than 30 books, including her 1974 debut The Cat Ate My Gymsuit, for children's and young adult audiences. At the time of her death, all her books were still in print; they had been published in 53 countries and translated into 14 languages.

== Education and early career ==
The Danziger family lived in Nutley, New Jersey, and Hollidaysburg, Pennsylvania, before settling in Metuchen, New Jersey, when Paula was in sixth grade. In an interview with BookPage, she said: "At age 12, I was put on tranquilizers when I should have gotten help. There was nothing major and awful. I just didn't feel [my family] was supportive and emotionally generous. My father was a very unhappy person, very sarcastic, and my mother [was] very nervous and worried about what people thought. They weren't monsters, but it wasn't a good childhood." She graduated from Metuchen High School.

She was encouraged to study nursing in college but instead studied to become a teacher at Montclair State University, where she was mentored by poet John Ciardi. After earning a bachelor's degree in education, Danziger taught junior high school English while pursuing a master's degree. After being injured in an automobile accident, she had trouble writing, as she was only able to write backwards. She was able to regain the ability to write normally, but she remained able to write backwards for the rest of her life. This sequence of events prompted her to do what she really want to do in life; she began writing.

Following the success of The Cat Ate My Gymsuit, Danziger left teaching to write full-time in 1978. She maintained homes in New York City and in Bearsville, New York. For several years, she had a flat in London, where she was known for presenting a regular item about children's literature on the BBC's Saturday-morning show Live & Kicking in the 1990s.

== Death ==
On June 9, 2004, she experienced chest pain while her niece, Carrie Danziger, was visiting. After trying to hide her discomfort and phoning a neighbor about her concern, she ultimately went to a hospital, where she was diagnosed as having suffered a heart attack. She remained in the hospital and died from complications of the heart attack at St. Luke's Hospital in Manhattan on July 8, 2004.

Following a memorial service at Riverside Memorial Chapel in New York City, Paula was buried in the Woodstock Artists Cemetery in Woodstock, New York. She was survived by her brother Barry, her niece Carrie, and three nephews.

== Writing career ==
Danziger's debut novel was The Cat Ate My Gymsuit, whose characters were largely based on her childhood experiences. She continued writing books for teens through the 1980s, expanding to books for younger readers with the Amber Brown series, whose protagonist is based on Danziger's niece Carrie. She frequently gave lectures and speeches, wearing elaborate costumes and calling herself a children's Dame Edna Everage. She is quoted as saying that her alternative career choice would have been to be a comedian.

She collaborated with Ann M. Martin twice, with P.S. Longer Letter Later (1998) and Snail Mail No More (2000). The two would send correspondence to each other as if they were the main characters.

Paula Danziger and her fellow author Bruce Coville read their work to each other over the phone beginning in 1992, continuing for over a decade as a two-person writers' group and later including author Elizabeth Levy. Following Danziger's passing, Coville and Levy continued her Amber Brown series, beginning with Amber Brown is Tickled Pink (2012), which told the story of the remarriage of the title character's mother.

== Awards ==
Paula Danziger's works were nominated for and won many US state-level children's book awards, including the Massachusetts Children's Book Award for The Cat Ate My Gymsuit in 1979 and the California Young Reader Medal for There's a Bat in Bunk Five in 1984. Four of her works were named IRA-CBC Children's Choices: The Pistachio Prescription in 1979, The Cat Ate My Gymsuit and Can You Sue Your Parents for Malpractice? in 1980, and There's a Bat in Bunk Five in 1981.

The Society of Children's Book Writers and Illustrators awards the Amber Brown Grant, which provides an all-expenses-paid, full-day visit by a well-respected children's author or illustrator, a stipend to assist in creating the event, and $250 worth of books by the visiting author, to one or two schools annually in her honor.

== Published works ==
=== For children ===
==== Amber Brown books ====
- Amber Brown is Not a Crayon (1994)
- You Can't Eat Your Chicken Pox, Amber Brown (1995)
- Amber Brown Goes Fourth (1995)
- Amber Brown Wants Extra Credit (1996)
- Forever Amber Brown (1996)
- Amber Brown Sees Red (1997)
- Amber Brown is Feeling Blue (1998)
- I, Amber Brown (1999)
- Amber Brown is Green with Envy (2003)
- Amber Brown is Tickled Pink (2012; in the style of, inspired by, dedicated to)

==== A is for Amber Brown series ====
- What a Trip, Amber Brown (2001)
- It's Justin Time, Amber Brown (2001)
- Get Ready for Second Grade, Amber Brown (2002)
- Orange You Glad It's Halloween, Amber Brown? (2002)
- It's a Fair Day, Amber Brown (2003)

==== Others ====
- Barfburger Baby, I Was Here First (2004)

=== For teenagers ===
==== Matthew Martin books ====
- Everyone Else's Parents Said Yes (1989)
- Make Like a Tree and Leave (1990)
- Earth to Matthew (1991)
- Not for a Billion Gazillion Dollars (1992)

==== Tara*Starr and Elizabeth books ====
- P.S. Longer Letter Later (with Ann M. Martin) (1998)
- Snail Mail No More (with Ann M. Martin) (2000)

==== Rosie and Phoebe books ====
- The Divorce Express (1982)
- It's an Aardvark-Eat-Turtle World (1985)

==== Marcy Lewis books ====
- The Cat Ate My Gymsuit (1974)
- There's a Bat in Bunk Five (1980)

==== Kendra Kaye books ====
- Remember Me to Harold Square (1987)
- Thames Doesn't Rhyme With James (1994)

==== Others ====
- The Pistachio Prescription (1978)
- Can You Sue Your Parents for Malpractice? (1979)
- This Place Has No Atmosphere (1986)
- United Tates of America (2002)
