= List of The Baby-Sitters Club novels =

The Baby-Sitters Club is a series of children's books by American author Ann M. Martin. Beginning in 1986, the series follows a group of eighth grade girls who start a baby-sitting business. The series ended in 2000, consisting of over 200 books; 176 million copies of the series were printed by the publisher, Scholastic. Beginning in 2006, some books were adapted into graphic novels by Scholastic's imprint Graphix. A prequel was released in 2010, and a new novel was released in 2026. While Martin wrote many of the books herself and provided outlines for the entire series, many of the books were ghostwritten by various authors.

== The Baby-Sitters Club ==
No.	Title	Publication Date (Note: The date of first printing is listed in the front matter of the book.)	Primary Author (Note: For ghostwritten novels, the primary author is credited in the front matter of the book.)	ISBN (Note: First paperback edition)
-	The Summer Before	April 2010	Ann M. Martin	978-0-545-24386-5
-	A prequel to Kristy's Great Idea.			
1	Kristy's Great Idea	August 1986	Ann M. Martin	978-0-590-33950-6
1	The Baby-Sitters Club (BSC) is formed by four best friends: Kristy Thomas, Claudia Kishi, Mary Anne Spier, and Stacey McGill.			
2	Claudia and the Phantom Phone Calls	October 1986	Ann M. Martin	978-0-590-22763-6
2	Claudia and her fellow BSC members start receiving creepy, silent phone calls while babysitting.			
3	The Truth About Stacey	December 1986	Ann M. Martin	978-0-590-43511-6
3	Stacey manages a secret diagnosis of type 1 diabetes and struggles to fit in while dealing with overprotective parents.			
4	Mary Anne Saves the Day	February 1987	Ann M. Martin	978-0-590-33953-7
4	Shy and sheltered Mary Anne navigates a massive fight among the BSC members.			
5	Dawn and the Impossible Three	May 1987	Ann M. Martin	978-0-590-43720-2
5	New member Dawn Schafer struggles to prove herself to the BSC by babysitting unruly children.			
6	Kristy's Big Day	July 1987	Ann M. Martin	978-0-590-40748-9
6	The BSC have to take the challenge of babysitting 14 children who are in town for Kristy's mother's wedding.			
7	Claudia and Mean Janine	September 1987	Ann M. Martin	978-0-590-41041-0
7	Claudia navigates her strained relationship with her older sister after their grandmother has a stroke.			
8	Boy-Crazy Stacey	November 1987	Ann M. Martin	978-0-590-41040-3
8	Stacey, while spending two weeks at the Jersey Shore babysitting, gets a crush on a lifeguard at the beach.			
9	The Ghost at Dawn's House	January 1988	Ann M. Martin	978-0-590-43508-6
9	Dawn thinks that her new house is haunted.			
10	Logan Likes Mary Anne!	February 1988	Ann M. Martin	978-0-590-41124-0
10	Logan Bruno, a new resident of Stoneybrook meets Mary Anne, and they develop a mutual crush on each other.			
11	Kristy and the Snobs	March 1988	Ann M. Martin	978-0-590-43660-1
11	Kristy moves to a new neighborhood following her mother's marriage, where she is made to feel inferior to the other, wealthier, residents.			
12	Claudia and the New Girl	April 1988	Ann M. Martin	978-0-590-43721-9
12	An artistic new student tries to convince Claudia to quit the BSC.			
13	Good-bye Stacey, Good-bye	May 1988	Ann M. Martin	978-0-590-43386-0
13	Stacey moves back to New York, and the members of the BSC find it hard to say goodbye to her.			
14	Hello, Mallory	June 1988	Ann M. Martin	978-0-590-43385-3
14	Following Stacey's move, the BSC invite Mallory Pike and Jessi Ramsey to join the club.			
15	Little Miss Stoneybrook...and Dawn	August 1988	Ann M. Martin	978-0-590-43717-2
15	The BSC get involved in a children's beauty contest.			
16	Jessi's Secret Language	September 1988	Ann M. Martin	978-0-590-41586-6
16	Jessi babysits a deaf boy and learns sign language.			
17	Mary Anne's Bad Luck Mystery	October 1988	Ann M. Martin	978-0-590-43659-5
17	Mary Anne gets mysterious letters saying she will have bad luck.			
18	Stacey's Mistake	November 1988	Ann M. Martin	978-0-590-43718-9
18	Stacey invites Kristy, Mary Anne, Dawn, and Claudia to New York so they can babysit a large group of children.			
19	Claudia and the Bad Joke	December 1988	Ann M. Martin	978-0-590-43510-9
19	Claudia's leg is broken by a babysitting charge who pulls a prank, and the BSC becomes involved in a prank war.			
20	Kristy and the Walking Disaster	January 1989	Ann M. Martin	978-0-590-43722-6
20	Kristy babysits a difficult child and starts the softball team Kristy's Krushers.			
21	Mallory and the Trouble with Twins	February 1989	Ann M. Martin	978-0-590-42005-1
21	Mallory babysits troublesome twins and tries to convince her parents to let her get her ears pierced.			
22	Jessi Ramsey, Pet-sitter	March 1989	Ann M. Martin	978-0-590-43658-8
22	Jessi has to take care of a house full of animals, including troublesome dogs and a snake.			
23	Dawn on the Coast	April 1989	Jan Carr	978-0-590-42007-5
23	Dawn visits her father and brother in California following her parents divorce, and contemplates moving there permanently.			
24	Kristy and the Mother's Day Surprise	June 1989	Ann M. Martin	978-0-590-43506-2
24	Kristy and the BSC plan an outing as a Mother's Day surprise for their clients.			
25	Mary Anne and the Search for Tigger	July 1989	Ann M. Martin	978-0-590-43347-1
25	Mary Anne's kitten goes missing.			
26	Claudia and the Sad Goodbye	August 1989	Ann M. Martin	978-0-590-42503-2
26	Claudia's family suffers a great loss when her grandmother dies.			
27	Jessi and the Superbrat	September 1989	Jan Carr	978-0-590-42502-5
27	Jessi babysits a famous child actor, who claims that he's being bothered by an unknown individual.			
28	Welcome Back, Stacey!	October 1989	Ann M. Martin	978-0-590-42501-8
28	Stacey's parents divorce and she chooses to live with her mother in Stoneybrook.			
29	Mallory and the Mystery Diary	November 1989	Ann M. Martin	978-0-590-42500-1
29	Mallory finds an old diary, which contains a mystery that involves an old portrait.			
30	Mary Anne and the Great Romance	January 1990	Ann M. Martin	978-0-590-42498-1
30	Mary Anne and Dawn become stepsisters when their parents marry.			
31	Dawn's Wicked Stepsister	February 1990	Ann M. Martin	978-0-590-42497-4
31	Dawn and Mary Anne struggle to adjust to living together as a family.			
32	Kristy and the Secret of Susan	March 1990	Ann M. Martin	978-0-590-42496-7
32	Kristy babysits a child who has autism.			
33	Claudia and the Great Search	April 1990	Ann M. Martin	978-0-590-42495-0
33	Claudia is unable to find any pictures of her as a baby, which causes her to believe that she may be adopted.			
34	Mary Anne and Too Many Boys	May 1990	Mary Lou Kennedy	978-0-590-42494-3
34	Mary Anne and Stacey return to the Jersey Shore to babysit.			
35	Stacey and the Mystery of Stoneybrook	June 1990	Ellen Miles	978-0-590-42508-7
35	The BSC and one of their babysitting charges investigate the noises coming from a house that was built on top of a graveyard.			
36	Jessi's Baby-sitter	August 1990	Ann M. Martin	978-0-590-43565-9
36	Jessi feels restricted and angry when her aunt moves in and tries to take control of her life.			
37	Dawn and the Older Boy	September 1990	Mary Lou Kennedy	978-0-590-43566-6
37	The members of the BSC are determined not to let Dawn get hurt by her boyfriend, who is older and always bossing her around.			
38	Kristy's Mystery Admirer	October 1990	Ann M. Martin	978-0-590-43567-3
38	Kristy receives mysterious love notes, which soon turn threatening.			
39	Poor Mallory!	November 1990	Ann M. Martin	978-0-590-43568-0
39	When Mallory's father loses his job, she and her siblings decide to earn money.			
40	Claudia and the Middle School Mystery	January 1991	Ellen Miles	978-0-590-44082-0
40	Claudia is accused of cheating on a test.			
41	Mary Anne vs. Logan	February 1991	Ann M. Martin	978-0-590-43570-3
41	Mary Anne is having trouble with her boyfriend Logan.			
42	Jessi and the Dance School Phantom	March 1991	Ellen Miles	978-0-590-44083-7
42	Jessi earns the lead in her dance school's ballet, and someone starts sabotaging her rehearsals and sending her threatening messages.			
43	Stacey's Emergency	April 1991	Ann M. Martin	978-0-590-43572-7
43	During a visit to New York, Stacey is hospitalized after a diabetic episode.			
44	Dawn and the Big Sleepover	May 1991	Peter Lerangis	978-0-590-43573-4
44	Dawn organizes a fundraiser to help a school that has burned down.			
45	Kristy and the Baby Parade	July 1991	Ellen Miles	978-0-590-43574-1
45	Problems develop after Kristy decides to enter the biennial Stoneybrook Baby Parade.			
46	Mary Anne Misses Logan	August 1991	Ann M. Martin	978-0-590-43569-7
46	Mary Anne begins to have second thoughts about ending her relationship with Logan.			
47	Mallory on Strike	September 1991	Jahnna N. Malcolm	978-0-590-44971-7
47	Mallory stops babysitting to focus on winning a writing award for young authors.			
48	Jessi's Wish	October 1991	Ann M. Martin	978-0-590-43571-0
48	When Jessi volunteers to help supervise a club, she meets a nine-year-old who is very sick with cancer.			
49	Claudia and the Genius of Elm Street	November 1991	Peter Lerangis	978-0-590-44970-0
49	Claudia feels insecure when she babysits a gifted young girl.			
50	Dawn's Big Date	January 1992	Suzanne Weyn	978-0-590-44969-4
50	Dawn tries to give herself a new image to impress her pen pal.			
51	Stacey's Ex-Best Friend	February 1992	Ann M. Martin	978-0-590-44968-7
51	Stacey's best friend visits Stoneybrook.			
52	Mary Anne + 2 Many Babies	March 1992	Ann M. Martin	978-0-590-44966-3
52	Mary Anne and Logan have an egg "baby" to look after for a school project.			
53	Kristy for President	April 1992	Nola Thacker	978-0-590-44967-0
53	When Kristy begins to dislike the way things are run at Stoneybrook Middle School, she takes charge by running for class president.			
54	Mallory and the Dream Horse	May 1992	Jahnna N. Malcolm	978-0-590-44965-6
54	Mallory takes riding lessons.			
55	Jessi's Gold Medal	June 1992	Peter Lerangis	978-0-590-44964-9
55	Jessi takes up synchronized swimming during gym class, and she and her partner compete in a contest.			
56	Keep Out, Claudia!	August 1992	Ann M. Martin	978-0-590-45657-9
56	A racist family does not want Claudia or Jessi to babysit for them.			
57	Dawn Saves the Planet	September 1992	Jahnna N. Malcolm	978-0-590-45658-6
57	Dawn takes action against pollution, but becomes obsessed and strains her friendships.			
58	Stacey's Choice	October 1992	Ann M. Martin	978-0-590-45659-3
58	Stacey is forced to choose between her parents when her mother is sick and her father has an important event.			
59	Mallory Hates Boys (and Gym)	November 1992	Suzanne Weyn	978-0-590-45660-9
59	Gym class and boys begin to ruin Mallory's life.			
60	Mary Anne's Makeover	January 1993	Peter Lerangis	978-0-590-45662-3
60	Mary Anne gets a haircut and a new look, but the members of the BSC are not pleased.			
61	Jessi and the Awful Secret	February 1993	Suzanne Weyn	978-0-590-45663-0
61	Jessi meets a dancer and suspects that she has an eating disorder.			
62	Kristy and the Worst Kid Ever	March 1993	Nola Thacker	978-0-590-45664-7
62	Kristy babysits a new foster child in Stoneybrook who is a troublemaker.			
63	Claudia's ~~Freind~~ Friend	April 1993	Nola Thacker	978-0-590-45665-4
63	Claudia babysits a child and discovers they have similar struggles with their schooling.			
64	Dawn's Family Feud	May 1993	Jahnna N. Malcolm	978-0-590-45666-1
64	Dawn and Mary Anne's new stepfamily encounters problems.			
65	Stacey's Big Crush	June 1993	Peter Lerangis	978-0-590-45667-8
65	Stacey develops a crush on her 22-year-old substitute math teacher.			
66	Maid Mary Anne	August 1993	Nola Thacker	978-0-590-47004-9
66	Mary Anne agrees to help an elderly woman with her housework in exchange for quilting and sewing lessons.			
67	Dawn's Big Move	September 1993	Peter Lerangis	978-0-590-47005-6
67	Dawn decides that seeing her father and brother only on holidays is not enough, and decides to move back to California for six months.			
68	Jessi and the Bad Baby-sitter	October 1993	Suzanne Weyn	978-0-590-47006-3
68	Jessi asks a new girl to join the BSC.			
69	Get Well Soon, Mallory!	November 1993	Jahnna N. Malcolm	978-0-590-47007-0
69	Mallory has not been feeling well and discovers she has mononucleosis.			
70	Stacey and the Cheerleaders	December 1993	Peter Lerangis	978-0-590-47008-7
70	Stacey tries out for the cheerleading squad because she has a crush on a basketball player.			
71	Claudia and the Perfect Boy	January 1994	Suzanne Weyn	978-0-590-47009-4
71	Claudia starts a personals column in the school newspaper to try and find a boyfriend.			
72	Dawn and the We ♥ Kids Club	February 1994	Peter Lerangis	978-0-590-47010-0
72	In California, the We Love Kids Club experiences fame and tries to handle it.			
73	Mary Anne and Miss Priss	March 1994	Jahnna N. Malcolm	978-0-590-47011-7
73	A babysitting charge is bothering Mary Anne with her fussiness.			
74	Kristy and the Copycat	April 1994	Nola Thacker	978-0-590-47012-4
74	Kristy's stepsister Karen continually copies her.			
75	Jessi's Horrible Prank	May 1994	Peter Lerangis	978-0-590-47013-1
75	Jessi plays a mean trick on her substitute teacher.			
76	Stacey's Lie	June 1994	Suzanne Weyn	978-0-590-47014-8
76	Stacey lies to her father to be with her boyfriend during her vacation.			
77	Dawn and Whitney, Friends Forever	August 1994	Nola Thacker	978-0-590-48221-9
77	Dawn makes a new friend when she babysits a 12-year-old girl with Down syndrome.			
78	Claudia and Crazy Peaches	September 1994	Jahnna N. Malcolm	978-0-590-48222-6
78	Claudia has trouble with her pregnant aunt.			
79	Mary Anne Breaks the Rules	October 1994	Peter Lerangis	978-0-590-48223-3
79	Mary Anne has Logan over during a sitting job and gets caught.			
80	Mallory Pike, #1 Fan	November 1994	Suzanne Weyn	978-0-590-48224-0
80	Mallory discovers that her favorite author lives in Stoneybrook.			
81	Kristy and Mr. Mom	January 1995	Jahnna N. Malcolm	978-0-590-48225-7
81	Kristy's stepfather has a heart attack and becomes a stay-at-home dad.			
82	Jessi and the Troublemaker	February 1995	Nola Thacker	978-0-590-48226-4
82	Jessi babysits a sick child whose parents let her do whatever she wants.			
83	Stacey vs. the BSC	March 1995	Peter Lerangis	978-0-590-48235-6
83	Stacey is not getting along with the members of the BSC.			
84	Dawn and the School Spirit War	April 1995	Suzanne Weyn	978-0-590-48228-8
84	Problems start during school spirit week and Mary Anne begins to fear going to school.			
85	Claudia Kishi, Live from WSTO!	May 1995	Peter Lerangis	978-0-590-48236-3
85	Claudia works for a radio station, and must deal with her assistant.			
86	Mary Anne and Camp BSC	June 1995	Nola Thacker	978-0-590-48227-1
86	The BSC run a summer camp for children, but when Mary Anne's father goes away on a business trip, she becomes depressed.			
87	Stacey and the Bad Girls	July 1995	Peter Lerangis	978-0-590-48237-0
87	Stacey's new friends are not responsible and get her in trouble.			
88	Farewell, Dawn	August 1995	Suzanne Weyn	978-0-590-22872-5
88	Dawn decides to move back to California permanently.			
89	Kristy and the Dirty Diapers	September 1995	Peter Lerangis	978-0-590-22873-2
89	Kristy's Krushers comes into conflict with a new sponsor.			
90	Welcome to the BSC, Abby	October 1995	Nola Thacker	978-0-590-22874-9
90	Abby Stevenson joins the BSC and has to prove herself.			
91	Claudia and the First Thanksgiving	November 1995	Nola Thacker	978-0-590-22875-6
91	Claudia's drama class writes a Thanksgiving play for the children at Stoneybrook Elementary.			
92	Mallory's Christmas Wish	December 1995	Peter Lerangis	978-0-590-22876-3
92	Mallory's family experiences fame when her little sister enters and wins a contest.			
93	Mary Anne and the Memory Garden	January 1996	Jahnna N. Malcolm	978-0-590-22877-0
93	Mary Anne's friend and English project partner dies in a car accident.			
94	Stacey McGill, Super Sitter	February 1996	Suzanne Weyn	978-0-590-22878-7
94	Stacey is taken advantage of by a new client, who makes her do extra work.			
95	Kristy + Bart = ?	March 1996	Peter Lerangis	978-0-590-22879-4
95	Kristy tries to figure out if she likes a boy romantically.			
96	Abby's Lucky Thirteen	April 1996	Nola Thacker	978-0-590-22880-0
96	Abby deals with being accused of cheating on a math test while she and her sister prepare for their bat mitzvah.			
97	Claudia and the World's Cutest Baby	May 1996	Peter Lerangis	978-0-590-22881-7
97	Claudia's aunt has a baby girl, and Claudia volunteers to help.			
98	Dawn and Too Many Sitters	June 1996	Peter Lerangis	978-0-590-22882-4
98	Dawn is back in Stoneybrook for the summer, and the BSC struggle to make money once they take on babysitters in training.			
99	Stacey's Broken Heart	August 1996	Suzanne Weyn	978-0-590-69205-2
99	Stacey fears it is the end of her relationship with her boyfriend as she prepares to visit New York City for a week.			
100	Kristy's Worst Idea	September 1996	Peter Lerangis	978-0-590-69206-9
100	The BSC is facing challenges, and a babysitting charge is hurt while Kristy is babysitting.			
101	Claudia Kishi, Middle School Dropout	October 1996	Ellen Miles	978-0-590-69207-6
101	Claudia is sent back to the seventh grade, where she does not know anyone.			
102	Mary Anne and the Little Princess	November 1996	Peter Lerangis	978-0-590-69208-3
102	A princess is moving to Stoneybrook for six months and Mary Anne is hired to introduce her to the American way of life.			
103	Happy Holidays, Jessi	December 1996	Peter Lerangis	978-0-590-69209-0
103	Jessi's brother is hurt in a car accident during the holidays.			
104	Abby's Twin	January 1997	Suzanne Weyn	978-0-590-69210-6
104	Abby's twin sister is diagnosed with scoliosis.			
105	Stacey the Math Whiz	February 1997	Peter Lerangis	978-0-590-69211-3
105	Stacey is asked to join the Stoneybrook Middle School Mathletes.			
106	Claudia, Queen of the Seventh Grade	March 1997	Peter Lerangis	978-0-590-69212-0
106	Claudia is elected Queen of the Seventh Grade.			
107	Mind Your Own Business, Kristy!	April 1997	Peter Lerangis	978-0-590-69213-7
107	Kristy is horrified by her older brother's new girlfriend.			
108	Don't Give Up, Mallory	May 1997	Jahnna N. Malcolm	978-0-590-69214-4
108	Mallory's dream class turns into a disappointment when her teacher favors the boys.			
109	Mary Anne to the Rescue	June 1997	Peter Lerangis	978-0-590-69215-1
109	The BSC take a first aid class.			
110	Abby the Bad Sport	August 1997	Nola Thacker	978-0-590-05988-6
110	Abby clashes with her soccer teammate.			
111	Stacey's Secret Friend	September 1997	Suzanne Weyn	978-0-590-05989-3
111	Stacey tries to help a friend with a makeover.			
112	Kristy and the Sister War	October 1997	Ellen Miles	978-0-590-05990-9
112	Kristy tries to smooth out tension in Shannon Kilbourne's house.			
113	Claudia Makes Up Her Mind	November 1997	Peter Lerangis	978-0-590-05991-6
113	Claudia must decide between two boys and if she wants to go back to eighth grade.			
114	The Secret Life of Mary Anne Spier	December 1997	Suzanne Weyn	978-0-590-05992-3
114	Mary Anne takes a second job at the mall, which she does not want anyone to find out about.			
115	Jessi's Big Break	January 1998	Peter Lerangis	978-0-590-05993-0
115	Jessi gets accepted at a dance school in New York City.			
116	Abby and the Best Kid Ever	February 1998	Nola Thacker	978-0-590-05994-7
116	A formerly troublesome babysitting charge is acting oddly well-behaved.			
117	Claudia and the Terrible Truth	March 1998	Ellen Miles	978-0-590-05995-4
117	Claudia is worried that her new babysitting charges are being abused.			
118	Kristy Thomas, Dog Trainer	April 1998	Nola Thacker	978-0-590-05996-1
118	Kristy and her family get a puppy that is being trained to be a guide dog.			
119	Stacey's Ex-Boyfriend	May 1998	Suzanne Weyn	978-0-590-05997-8
119	Stacey's ex-boyfriend is feeling down and wants her to cheer him up.			
120	Mary Anne and the Playground Fight	June 1998	Diane Molleson	978-0-590-05998-5
120	The babysitters compete for job openings at a new playground camp.			
121	Abby in Wonderland	August 1998	Suzanne Weyn	978-0-590-50063-0
121	Abby worries that there is something wrong with her grandmother.			
122	Kristy in Charge	September 1998	Suzanne Weyn	978-0-590-50064-7
122	Kristy is involved in a feud with a classmate when they are assigned to teach gym together.			
123	Claudia's Big Party	October 1998	Vicki Berger Erwin	978-0-590-50174-3
123	Claudia hosts a party with both her old and new friends when her parents are out of town.			
124	Stacey McGill...Matchmaker?	November 1998	Suzanne Weyn	978-0-590-50175-0
124	Stacey plays matchmaker between her mother and the father of her new babysitting charges.			
125	Mary Anne in the Middle	December 1998	Suzanne Weyn	978-0-590-50179-8
125	Mary Anne gets in the middle of a feud between Jessi and Mallory.			
126	The All-New Mallory Pike	January 1999	Ellen Miles	978-0-590-50349-5
126	Mallory leaves Stoneybrook in order to attend a boarding school.			
127	Abby's Un-Valentine	February 1999	Nola Thacker	978-0-590-50350-1
127	Abby dislikes the romance of Valentine's Day.			
128	Claudia and the Little Liar	March 1999	Suzanne Weyn	978-0-590-50351-8
128	A babysitting charge starts lying about the BSC, trying to turn other kids against them.			
129	Kristy at Bat	April 1999	Ellen Miles	978-0-590-50352-5
129	Kristy gets demoted to second string on her school's softball team.			
130	Stacey's Movie	May 1999	Suzanne Weyn	978-0-590-50389-1
130	Stacey makes a documentary about life in Stoneybrook.			
131	The Fire at Mary Anne's House	June 1999	Ellen Miles	978-0-590-50390-7
131	When Mary Anne's house is destroyed by a fire, her family considers leaving Stoneybrook.			

== Super Specials ==
No.	Title	Publication Date	Primary Author	ISBN
1	Baby-sitters on Board!	July 1988	Ann M. Martin	978-0-590-41588-0
1	The BSC fly to Florida to cruise the Bahamas and visit Disney World.			
2	Baby-sitters' Summer Vacation	July 1989	Ann M. Martin	978-0-590-42419-6
2	The BSC spend the summer as counselors-in-training at Camp Mohawk.			
3	Baby-sitters' Winter Vacation	December 1989	Ann M. Martin	978-0-590-43973-2
3	The BSC go on a school trip to Vermont.			
4	Baby-sitters' Island Adventure	July 1990	Ann M. Martin	978-0-545-63073-3
4	Claudia, Dawn, and four kids are marooned on an island after a storm blows in during a sailing race.			
5	California Girls!	December 1990	Ann M. Martin	978-0-590-43575-8
5	The BSC take a vacation to California after winning the lottery.			
6	New York, New York!	June 1991	Ann M. Martin	978-0-590-43576-5
6	The BSC visit New York City for two weeks.			
7	Snowbound	December 1991	Ann M. Martin	978-0-590-44963-2
7	Twenty-one inches of snow fall in Stoneybrook, stranding the BSC.			
8	Baby-sitters at Shadow Lake	July 1992	Ann M. Martin	978-0-590-44962-5
8	The BSC go on vacation at Shadow Lake, where they find a mysterious island.			
9	Starring the Baby-sitters Club!	December 1992	Ann M. Martin	978-0-590-45661-6
9	A play opens at Stoneybrook Middle School, starring the BSC and some of their babysitting charges.			
10	Sea City, Here We Come!	July 1993	Peter Lerangis	978-0-590-45674-6
10	The BSC go to Sea City with the Pikes to help the family.			
11	The Baby-sitters Remember	July 1994	Ann M. Martin	978-0-590-47015-5
11	The BSC share their most vivid memories.			
12	Here Come the Bridesmaids!	December 1994	Peter Lerangis	978-0-590-48308-7
12	Dawn's father is getting married in California, and a client of the BSC is getting married in Stoneybrook on the same day.			
13	Aloha, Baby-sitters!	July 1996	Peter Lerangis	978-0-590-22883-1
13	When Mallory cannot go with the BSC on a trip to Hawaii, her friends take photos and notes to share with her.			
14	BSC in the USA	July 1997	Peter Lerangis	978-0-590-69216-8
14	The BSC take a road trip across the United States.			
15	Baby-sitters' European Vacation	July 1998	Peter Lerangis	978-0-590-06000-4
15	The BSC visit London and Paris.			

=== Super Specials: Fan Edition ===
No.	Title	Publication Date	Authors	ISBN
1	Baby-Sitter Summer	July 2026	Ann M. Martin, Becky Albertalli, Coe Booth, Sarah Kuhn, Peter Lerangis, Jahnna N. Malcolm, Emma Straub	978-1-5461-7137-9
1	The BSC members have separate adventures.			

== Mysteries ==
No.	Title	Publication Date	Primary Author	ISBN
1	Stacey and the Missing Ring	August 1991	Ellen Miles	978-0-590-44084-4
1	Stacey is accused of stealing a ring while babysitting.			
2	Beware, Dawn!	November 1991	Ellen Miles	978-0-590-44085-1
2	Dawn begins to receive threats from an unknown person.			
3	Mallory and the Ghost Cat	February 1992	Ellen Miles	978-0-590-44799-7
3	Mallory discovers a cat in the attic of a house while investigating mysterious noises.			
4	Kristy and the Missing Child	May 1992	Ellen Miles	978-0-590-55517-3
4	Kristy was the last person to see a child who has gone missing.			
5	Mary Anne and the Secret in the Attic	August 1992	Ellen Miles	978-0-590-44801-7
5	Mary Anne finds out the truth about her past.			
6	The Mystery at Claudia's House	November 1992	Ellen Miles	978-0-590-44961-8
6	Claudia's room is ransacked and her sister is caught lying to their parents.			
7	Dawn and the Disappearing Dogs	February 1993	Ellen Miles	978-0-590-44960-1
7	Dawn's pet-sitting charge and Kristy's puppy go missing.			
8	Jessi and the Jewel Thieves	April 1993	Ellen Miles	978-0-590-44959-5
8	Jessi visits her friend in New York City and investigates a jewel heist.			
9	Kristy and the Haunted Mansion	June 1993	Ellen Miles	978-0-545-76893-1
9	Kristy is stuck with her softball team overnight in a mansion.			
10	Stacey and the Mystery Money	August 1993	Ellen Miles	978-0-590-45696-8
10	Stacey accidentally pays someone with counterfeit money.			
11	Claudia and the Mystery at the Museum	November 1993	Ellen Miles	978-0-590-47049-0
11	Claudia is visiting Stoneybrook's new museum when several thefts occur.			
12	Dawn and the Surfer Ghost	December 1993	Ellen Miles	978-0-590-47050-6
12	Dawn believes she sees a ghost off the coast of California.			
13	Mary Anne and the Library Mystery	February 1994	Ellen Miles	978-0-606-05740-0
13	Mary Anne gets a job at Stoneybrook Library; however, someone is setting books on fire.			
14	Stacey and the Mystery at the Mall	April 1994	Ellen Miles	978-0-590-47052-0
14	The BSC are working at the Washington Mall for a class when a series of thefts occurs.			
15	Kristy and the Vampires	June 1994	Ellen Miles	978-0-590-47053-7
15	Kristy experiences trouble while on the set of a television film being shot in Stoneybrook.			
16	Claudia and the Clue in the Photograph	August 1994	Ellen Miles	978-0-590-47054-4
16	Claudia tries to uncover who committed a bank robbery.			
17	Dawn and the Halloween Mystery	October 1994	Ellen Miles	978-0-590-48232-5
17	Trick-or-treating is called off after a robbery in Dawn's neighborhood.			
18	Stacey and the Mystery at the Empty House	December 1994	Ellen Miles	978-0-590-48233-2
18	Stacey is house sitting while a client is away, and begins suspecting that she is not alone.			
19	Kristy and the Missing Fortune	February 1995	Ellen Miles	978-0-590-48234-9
19	Kristy tries to find the fortune of a young heiress who disappeared.			
20	Mary Anne and the Zoo Mystery	April 1995	Jahnna N. Malcolm	978-0-590-48309-4
20	Mary Anne goes to the zoo on a class trip and they discover someone has been letting animals out of their cages.			
21	Claudia and the Recipe for Danger	August 1995	Ellen Miles	978-0-590-48310-0
21	Claudia and Mary Anne enter a baking contest, but experience sabotage.			
22	Stacey and the Haunted Masquerade	October 1995	Ellen Miles	978-0-590-22866-4
22	Mysterious things occur as Stacey helps plan a Halloween dance.			
23	Abby and the Secret Society	February 1996	Ellen Miles	978-0-590-22867-1
23	Abby attempts to solve a murder that is tied to an old country club where she works part-time.			
24	Mary Anne and the Silent Witness	April 1996	Ellen Miles	978-0-590-22868-8
24	Mary Anne discovers that her babysitting charge has witnessed vandalism and a fire, but is too scared to tell anyone what he saw.			
25	Kristy and the Middle School Vandal	June 1996	Nola Thacker	978-0-545-79243-1
25	Kristy attempts to discover who vandalized the school, while the BSC try to win a mystery war.			
26	Dawn Schafer, Undercover Baby-sitter	October 1996	Ellen Miles	978-0-590-22870-1
26	Dawn babysits for a family feuding over an inheritance and attempts to solve the mystery.			
27	Claudia and the Lighthouse Ghost	December 1996	Peter Lerangis	978-0-590-69175-8
27	Claudia hears a terrible story that happened a long time ago at the old Stoneybrook lighthouse.			
28	Abby and the Mystery Baby	February 1997	Ellen Miles	978-0-590-69176-5
28	Abby's family takes in a baby left on their porch while the authorities look for the parents.			
29	Stacey and the Fashion Victim	April 1997	Ellen Miles	978-0-545-79326-1
29	Stacey tries to figure out who is threatening a fashion show.			
30	Kristy and the Mystery Train	June 1997	Nola Thacker	978-0-590-69178-9
30	Three babysitters embark on a mystery tour with a child star.			
31	Mary Anne and the Music Box Secret	August 1997	Ellen Miles	978-0-590-69179-6
31	Mary Anne finds a package hidden in the basement of her grandparents' house with a curse written on it.			
32	Claudia and the Mystery in the Painting	October 1997	Vicki Berger Erwin	978-0-590-05972-5
32	Claudia tries to prove her friend's grandmother did not burn her own famous paintings.			
33	Stacey and the Stolen Hearts	February 1998	Ellen Miles	978-0-590-05973-2
33	Someone steals a bag of Valentine grams and begins using them to reveal personal information.			
34	Mary Anne and the Haunted Bookstore	April 1998	Vicki Berger Erwin	978-0-590-05974-9
34	Mary Anne gets a job at a bookstore, and comes to believe it is haunted.			
35	Abby and the Notorious Neighbor	June 1998	Ellen Miles	978-0-590-05975-6
35	Abby becomes convinced that her neighbor is a thief, and tries to gather evidence to take to the police.			
36	Kristy and the Cat Burglar	August 1998	Ellen Miles	978-0-590-05976-3
36	Kristy and her friends try to solve a burglary at a Stoneybook mansion.			

=== Super Mysteries ===
No.	Title	Publication Date	Primary Author	ISBN
1	Baby-sitters' Haunted House	June 1995	Jeanne Betancourt	978-0-590-48311-7
1	Kristy, Claudia, Mary Anne, and Dawn take a trip to Maine to babysit.			
2	Baby-sitters Beware	December 1995	Nola Thacker	978-0-590-22871-8
2	A series of accidents makes the BSC members fear for their safety.			
3	Baby-sitters' Fright Night	October 1996	Nola Thacker	978-0-590-69180-2
3	Kristy, Mary Anne, Stacey, Abby, and Mallory take a school trip to Salem, Massachusetts.			
4	Baby-sitters' Christmas Chiller	December 1997	Nola Thacker	978-0-590-18816-6
4	The BSC become tangled up in a string of mysterious events during the Christmas season.			

== Reader's Requests ==
No.	Title	Publication Date	Primary Author	ISBN
1	Logan's Story	June 1992	Peter Lerangis	978-0-590-45575-6
1	Logan Bruno is teased by the members of his football team when they find out that he is a member of the BSC.			
2	Logan Bruno, Boy Baby-sitter	July 1993	Peter Lerangis	978-0-590-47118-3
2	Logan gets in trouble when he starts hanging out with a member of Stoneybrook Middle School's resident gang.			
3	Shannon's Story	September 1994	Nola Thacker	978-0-590-47756-7
3	Shannon Kilbourne makes trouble when her mother announces she's chaperoning Shannon's school trip to Paris.			

== Portrait Collections ==
No.	Title	Publication Date	Primary Author	ISBN
1	Stacey's Book	November 1994	Jeanne Betancourt	978-0-590-48399-5
Stacey writes an autobiography for a class project.
2	Claudia's Book	March 1995	Nola Thacker	978-0-590-48400-8
Claudia writes an autobiography for a class project.
3	Dawn's Book	September 1995	Jeanne Betancourt	978-0-590-22864-0
Dawn writes an autobiography for a class project.
4	Mary Anne's Book	March 1996	Jeanne Betancourt	978-0-590-22865-7
Mary Anne writes an autobiography for a class project.
5	Kristy's Book	September 1996	Jeanne Betancourt	978-0-590-69181-9
Kristy writes an autobiography for a class project.
6	Abby's Book	March 1998	Jeanne Betancourt	978-0-590-69182-6
Abby writes an autobiography for a class project.

== Friends Forever ==
No.	Title	Publication Date	Primary Author	ISBN
1	Kristy's Big News	August 1999	Nola Thacker	978-0-590-52313-4
1	Kristy is asked to be a bridesmaid at her father's wedding.			
2	Stacey vs. Claudia	September 1999	Suzanne Weyn	978-0-590-52318-9
2	Stacey tries to set Claudia up with a boy, but it becomes obvious he's only interested in Stacey.			
3	Mary Anne's Big Breakup	October 1999	Suzanne Weyn	978-0-590-52326-4
3	Mary Anne decides to breakup with Logan due to their growing incompatible interests and values.			
4	Claudia and the Friendship Feud	November 1999	Laura Dower	978-0-590-52331-8
4	Claudia and Stacey are not speaking to each other because of a fight, and Claudia finds a new friend.			
5	Kristy Power!	December 1999	Ellen Miles	978-0-590-52332-5
5	Kristy is paired with a classmate for an assignment, and Kristy discovers he has a secret.			
6	Stacey and the Boyfriend Trap	January 2000	Suzanne Weyn	978-0-590-52337-0
6	Five of Stacey's ex-boyfriends come into the picture at once.			
7	Claudia Gets Her Guy	February 2000	Suzanne Weyn	978-0-590-52338-7
7	Claudia has a chance to both date someone and mend her friendship with Stacey.			
8	Mary Anne's Revenge	March 2000	Nola Thacker	978-0-590-52340-0
8	A student spreads rumors about Mary Anne and Logan.			
9	Kristy and the Kidnapper	April 2000	Ellen Miles	978-0-590-52343-1
9	Kristy and Abby go to Washington, D.C. for a debate competition.			
10	Stacey's Problem	June 2000	Suzanne Weyn	978-0-590-52345-5
10	Stacey is excited that her dad is getting remarried, but her mom is not.			
11	Welcome Home, Mary Anne	August 2000	Ellen Miles	978-0-590-52346-2
11	Mary Anne's new house is finally complete.			
12	Claudia and the Disaster Date	October 2000	Nola Thacker	978-0-590-52348-6
12	Claudia starts dating the class clown and begins to see a different side of him.			

=== Friends Forever Specials ===
No.	Title	Publication Date	Primary Author	ISBN
1	Everything Changes	July 1999	Ann M. Martin	978-0-590-50391-4
1	Some members are leaving the BSC, others are looking for a new beginning.			
2	Graduation Day	November 2000	Ann M. Martin	978-0-439-21918-1
2	After burying a time capsule, Kristy, Claudia, Mary Anne, Stacey, Abby, and Logan graduate from Stoneybrook Middle School.			

== Graphic novels ==
No.	Title	Publication Date	Adapter and illustrator	ISBN
1	Kristy's Great Idea	2006 (B&W) 2015 (Color)	Raina Telgemeier	978-0-439-73933-7 978-0-545-81387-7
2	The Truth About Stacey	2006 (B&W) 2015 (Color)	Raina Telgemeier	978-0-439-73936-8 978-0-545-81389-1
3	Mary Anne Saves the Day	2007 (B&W) 2015 (Color)	Raina Telgemeier	978-0-439-88516-4 978-0-545-88621-5
4	Claudia and Mean Janine	2008 (B&W) 2016 (Color)	Raina Telgemeier	978-0-439-88517-1 978-0-545-88622-2
5	Dawn and the Impossible Three	2017 (Color)	Gale Galligan	978-1-338-06711-8
6	Kristy's Big Day	2018 (Color)	Gale Galligan	978-1-338-06768-2
7	Boy Crazy Stacey	2019 (Color)	Gale Galligan	978-1-338-30452-7
8	Logan Likes Mary Anne!	2020 (Color)	Gale Galligan	978-1-338-30455-8
9	Claudia and the New Girl	2021 (Color)	Gabriela Epstein	978-1-338-30458-9
10	Kristy and the Snobs	2021 (Color)	Chan Chau	978-1-338-30461-9
11	Good-bye Stacey, Good-bye	2022 (Color)	Gabriela Epstein	978-1-338-61605-7
12	Jessi's Secret Language	2022 (Color)	Chan Chau	978-1-338-61607-1
13	Mary Anne's Bad Luck Mystery	2022 (Color)	Cynthia Yuan Cheng	978-1-338-61610-1
14	Stacey's Mistake	2023 (Color)	Ellen T. Crenshaw	978-1-338-61613-2
15	Claudia and the Bad Joke	2023 (Color)	Arley Nopra	978-1-338-83551-9
16	Kristy and the Walking Disaster	2024 (Color)	Ellen T. Crenshaw	978-1-338-83556-4
17	Mallory and the Trouble with Twins	2025 (Color)	Arley Nopra	978-1-338-83564-9
18	Jessi Ramsey, Pet-Sitter	2025 (Color)	Ellen T. Crenshaw	978-1-338-83565-6
19	Dawn on the Coast	2026 (Color)	Arley Nopra	978-1-76172-915-7
20	Kristy and the Mother's Day Surprise	2026 (Color)	Gabriela Epstein	978-1-5461-3559-3

== Other titles ==
Title	Publication Date	Author	ISBN
The Baby-Sitters Club Trivia and Puzzle Fun Book	1992	Kara Adamo	978-0-590-46065-1
Puzzles and trivia related to the series.
Baby-Sitters Club Guide to Baby-Sitting	1993	Jahnna Beecham	978-0-590-47686-7
A baby-sitting guide.
Secret Santa	1994	Ann M. Martin	978-0-590-48295-0
The members of the BSC play Secret Santa.
Complete Guide to the Baby-Sitters Club	1996	Ann M. Martin	978-0-590-92713-0
A reference book that extensively covers the characters and town of Stoneybrook.
The BSC Notebook	1996	Sonia W. Black, Pat Brigandi	978-0-590-45074-4
A collection of baby-sitting tips.
BSC Chain Letter	1996	Ann M. Martin	978-0-590-47151-0
The BSC pass around a chain letter while on vacation, when Kristy's in the hospital with appendicitis.
The Baby-Sitters Club Postcard Book	1996	Ann M. Martin	978-0-590-44783-6
A collection of thirty full-color postcards from various covers of the series.

== Spin-offs ==
The Baby-Sitters Club has resulted in two spin-off series. The Baby-Sitters Little Sister series, aimed at younger readers, follows Kristy's stepsister Karen. It consists of 128 books and a series of graphic novels. The California Diaries, aimed at children 11-14, follows Dawn's life in California after she moves there permanently.
