= The Baby-Sitters Club =

Novel series

Official logo for the franchise

The Baby-Sitters Club (also known as the BSC) is a series of novels written by Ann M. Martin and published by Scholastic between 1986 and 2000. Collectively, the series has sold more than 190 million copies. Martin has authored an estimated 60–80 novels in the series, while subsequent titles have been written by ghostwriters such as Peter Lerangis.

The Baby-Sitters Club is about a group of friends living in the fictional, suburban town of Stoneybrook, Connecticut, who run a local babysitting service called the "Baby-Sitters Club". The original four members are Kristy Thomas (founder and president), Mary Anne Spier (secretary), Claudia Kishi (vice-president), and Stacey McGill (treasurer), but the number of members varies throughout the series. The novels are told in first person and deal with issues such as illness, divorce, and moving house.

As the series progresses, Dawn Schafer (Alternate Officer), Mallory Pike and Jessi Ramsey (Junior Officers), Logan Bruno (Associate Member), Shannon Kilbourne (second Associate Member), and Abby Stevenson (Replacement Alternate Officer for Dawn) join the Baby-Sitters Club.

== History of the series ==
The Baby-Sitters Club series originated when Jean Feiwel, an editor at Scholastic, saw the popularity of a novel called Katie's Babysitting Job by Martha Tolles and realized there was a market for novels about babysitting. She contacted Ann M. Martin, who took the general idea of a babysitter's club and created the characters, plots, and settings for the series. It was initially planned as a 10-book series; however, the first 10 novels were only moderately successful. Scholastic ordered 100 more, followed by 20 more as the series grew in popularity. By the time the 11th novel was published, the first printing was up to 100,000 copies. When publishing ceased in 2000, there had been 213 novels published in the series. Of these, Martin estimates she wrote from 60 to 80.

== Structure of the novels ==
With the exception of Super Specials and Super Mysteries, the novels are written and narrated from one character's point of view. The novels generally follow this format:

- Chapter 1: Introduction to character; beginning of plot.
- Chapter 2: Description of the club and its members, along with the character's family.
- Chapters 3–15: Continuation of plot and conclusion, usually accompanied with a subplot.

== Main characters ==
=== Kristin "Kristy" Amanda Thomas ===
- Club Role: President
- Appearance: Shortest girl in eighth grade, white, brown hair, brown eyes; usual clothing is ripped jeans or normal jeans, a sweater, hoodie, turtleneck or sport shirt, sneakers, and a baseball hat.
- Birthday: August 20
- Age: 12 and 13 (14 in later novels)

Kristy Thomas is the founder and president of the Baby-Sitters Club. She is depicted as assertive, energetic, and athletic, often taking leadership roles among her peers. The idea for the BSC originates from her own experience, when her mother struggled to find a babysitter for Kristy's younger brother, which inspired her to create a coordinated babysitting service. Kristy lives with her large, blended family and is known for her interest in sports, particularly softball, which she coaches. She is commonly described as a tomboy and typically wears casual clothing.

Kristy is played by Avriel Hillman in the HBO series, Sophie Grace in the Netflix series, and Schuyler Fisk in the film adaptation.

=== Claudia Lynn Kishi ===
- Club Position: Vice President
- Appearance: Asian, long black hair, dark brown eyes, wild and unpredictable outfits.
- Birthday: July 11
- Age: 12 (13 in later novels)

Claudia is Japanese American. She is extremely creative in both her artwork and wardrobe. She is the vice president because she has her own phone in her room, and she takes after-hours calls. She always has snacks, junk food, and candy hidden around her room for the meetings. She is described as creative, talented, sophisticated, and trendy. Claudia loves to draw, paint, sculpt, make jewelry, and sketch. She loves to read Nancy Drew mystery books. Claudia hides her Nancy Drew mysteries and her candy around her room because her parents do not approve of them. Despite her diet, she effortlessly maintains a slender figure and clear skin. Claudia's mother is the head librarian at Stoneybrook Public Library and her father is a banker. Her older sister Janine is a real-life genius with an IQ of 196. In Claudia and Mean Janine, Claudia's grandma, Mimi had a serious stroke which causes Claudia to take better care of her and be around her more often. Claudia has an aunt, Peaches (her real name is Miyoshi), whose husband is named Russ, and a cousin named Lynn. Claudia feels that no one in her family understands her, except for her beloved grandmother, Mimi, who died in Claudia and the Sad Goodbye.

Claudia is played by Jeni F. Winslow in the HBO series, Momona Tamada in the Netflix series, and Tricia Joe in the film adaptation.

=== Mary Anne Spier ===
- Club Position: Secretary
- Appearance: White (in the books, the 1990 TV show and the 1995 movie); mixed in the 2020 Netflix series. Has long brown hair worn in childish braids until Mary Anne Saves the Day; she cuts it short in Mary Anne's Makeover, brown eyes; usual clothing is a blouse and a skirt until her makeover, where she starts to wear modern clothing.
- Birthday: September 22
- Age: 12 (13 in later novels)

Mary Anne is the secretary of the club due to her exceptional organizational skills and neat handwriting. Her hobbies include sewing, knitting, watching classic movies, and reading. She and her best friend, Kristy, initially looked similar (but had very different personalities) until Mary Anne cut her hair and began wearing a little makeup in Mary Anne's Makeover. She also vowed never to get her ears pierced due to being traumatized by almost having her ears pierced by a fellow camper at Camp Mohawk. Mary Anne and Kristy have been best friends since childhood and were neighbors until Kristy's mother married Watson Brewer and Kristy had to move to Watson's new neighborhood. Mary Anne's mother died from cancer when she was a baby, and her father Richard (who is a lawyer) was very overprotective until he married Sharon Schafer and loosened up. She is very sensitive, and shy, is a good listener, and does not like being the center of attention. In Logan Likes Mary Anne! Mary Anne starts going out with Logan Bruno, and she is the first member who has a steady boyfriend. Mary Anne has a stepsister named Dawn, a stepbrother named Jeff, and a kitten named Tigger. In Mary Anne and the Secret in the Attic it is revealed that she lived with her grandparents before her dad raised her on his own.

It was revealed that Ann M. Martin based the character of Mary Anne on herself. Mary Anne is played by Meghan Lahey in the HBO series, Malia Baker in the Netflix series, and Rachael Leigh Cook in the film adaptation.

=== Anastasia "Stacey" Elizabeth McGill ===
- Club Position: Treasurer
- Appearance: White, blonde hair that she often gets permed, blue eyes; usual clothing is sophisticated and polished, often wears jeans.
- Birthday: April 3
- Age: 12 and 13 (14 in later novels)

A native New Yorker, Stacey moves to Stoneybrook in the seventh grade, around the time she is diagnosed with Type 1 diabetes. She quickly becomes friends with Claudia because of their shared love for both fashion and boys. They are considered to be the best-dressed students at Stoneybrook Middle School (Stacey is the more sophisticated dresser, while Claudia is more creative and original). Stacey has Type 1 diabetes and has been hospitalized several times as a result; in Kristy's Great Idea, she tries to hide this from the others, since her classmates in New York teased her because of it, but she eventually tells her new friends. Because she excels in math, she is the club's treasurer. Her talent in math inspired her to join the Stoneybrook Middle School Mathlete Club. Stacey leaves Stoneybrook when her father is transferred back to New York City but returns after her parents' divorce. She later leaves the club for a short time after she starts dating Robert Brewster and chooses him over the club. However, she later returns to the club after she has an unpleasant experience with some girls who pretended to be her friends; this makes her realize who her real friends are.

Stacey is played by Jessica Prunell in the HBO series, Shay Rudolph in the Netflix series, and Bre Blair in the film adaptation.

=== Dawn Read Schafer ===
- Club Position: Official Alternate Officer
- Appearance: White, long blonde hair, blue eyes, in the Netflix series she is Latina and has brown hair and brown eyes.
- Birthday: February 5
- Age: 12 (13 in later novels)

Dawn grew up in California, until her parents' divorce. Dawn moved with her younger brother Jeff and her mother across the country to Stoneybrook, Connecticut, where her mother, Sharon, grew up. Jeff had a lot of trouble adjusting to the move and soon returned to California to live with their father. Dawn is a vegetarian, addicted to healthy food (she can't stand sugary snacks), likes ghost stories, and is also into environmentalism. She joins Stoneybrook Middle School in the middle of the seventh grade when the club members are having a fight. She meets Mary Anne and they instantly bond. Her mother and Mary Anne's father marry; they dated while they were in high school, and once reunited, they discover that they still love each other. Dawn and Mary Anne become stepsisters as a result. Kristy, Mary Anne's best friend, is initially jealous, but gets over it and invites Dawn to become the fifth member of the club once the fight between the club members ends. Dawn temporarily moves back to California in Dawn's Big Move, but returns to Stoneybrook in Kristy and Mr. Mom. However, in Farewell, Dawn, she moves back to California permanently.

Dawn is played by Melissa Chasse in the HBO series, Xochitl Gomez (season 1) and Kyndra Sanchez (season 2) in the Netflix series, and Larisa Oleynik in the film adaptation.

=== Mallory Pike ===
- Club Position: Junior Officer, then Honorary Member
- Appearance: White, curly reddish brown hair, blue eyes, clear braces, and glasses.
- Birthday: May 2
- Age: 10 (11 in later novels)

Mallory's first appearance was in The Truth About Stacey as a sitting charge. The members used to babysit Mallory along with her seven younger siblings. However, when she became 11, she joined the club as a Junior Officer after Stacey's departure.

Mallory feels that her parents treat her like a baby, and although she was allowed to get her ears pierced in Mallory and the Trouble with Twins, she still feels self-conscious about her glasses and braces. She loves drawing, writing, and reading; her dream is to become a children's book author and illustrator. Her family has a pet hamster named Frodo; they later adopt Pow, who was the Barretts' dog. Mallory was given the opportunity to teach eighth-grade students as part of a school event. However, after she accidentally broke a piece of chalk during a lesson, the eighth-grade students began calling her "Spaz Girl" and so did the other students from other grades in the school. This resulted in Mallory transferring to a boarding school, where she stayed until the end of the series.

Mallory is played by Meghan Andrews in the HBO series, Vivian Watson in the Netflix series, and Stacy Linn Ramsower in the film adaptation.

=== Jessica "Jessi" Davis Ramsey ===
- Club Position: Junior Officer
- Appearance: Black, curly dark brown hair, brown eyes, long legs, flexible
- Birthday: June 30
- Age: 11

Jessi moved to Stoneybrook from Oakley, New Jersey at the beginning of the sixth grade; her family moved into Stacey's old house. She has an eight-year-old sister Rebecca, called "Becca", and a baby brother named John Phillip Ramsey Jr., whose nickname is "Squirt". When Jessi and her family first moved to Stoneybrook, some people were racist toward them because they were Black, but this improved later. In Hello, Mallory, Mallory meets Jessi, and they instantly bond and form their own babysitting club, "Kids Incorporated", before joining The Baby-Sitters Club, as not letting Mallory in due to her not knowing enough babysitting tips. In Jessi's Baby-sitter, Jessi's Aunt Cecelia moves into Jessi's house. Jessi calls her "Aunt Dictator" and at first Jessi hates her (because her aunt was strict), but at the end of the novel they become friends, and she is part of the household for the rest of the series. Jessi learns American Sign Language in Jessi's Secret Language when she babysits for Haley and Matthew "Matt" Braddock because Matt is a deaf child. Jessi is a talented ballerina and has had leading roles in several ballets and takes ballet classes at Stamford Ballet School with Madame Noelle, her ballet teacher. Jessi's best friend is Mallory Pike, and they are both junior officers.

Jessi is played by Nicole Leach in the HBO series, Anais Lee in the Netflix series, and Zelda Harris in the film adaptation.

=== Abigail "Abby" Stevenson ===
- Club Position: Alternate Officer
- Appearance: White, long curly dark brown hair, brown eyes
- Birthday: October 15
- Age: 12 (13 in later novels)

Abby first appeared in Kristy and the Dirty Diapers. Shortly after Dawn moved back to California to live with her father, Abby moved to Stoneybrook from Long Island with her mother and twin sister, Anna. Her father died in a car accident when she was nine years old, which was part of the reason for the move. Abby still misses him and does not like to talk about him. Abby and her family moved into a house on McLelland Road and spent the first night in the neighborhood sleeping over at Kristy's. Abby is Jewish. She has asthma and carries inhalers. She is allergic to shellfish, kitty litter, dust, pollen, milk, tomatoes, and eggs. Abby is described as wild, funny, and athletic. Abby and Kristy have similar competitive personalities and sometimes clash. Anna is quieter than Abby. Anna is a serious violinist who practices four hours a day, and she hates sports. The Baby-Sitters Club invited both Abby and Anna to join the club. Anna declined because of her music studies, but Abby takes Dawn's place as an alternate officer.

=== Logan Bruno ===
- Club Position: Associate Member
- Appearance: White, dark blond hair, blue eyes
- Birthday: January 10
- Age: 13 (14 in later novels)

Logan moved from Louisville, Kentucky, before eighth grade. He first appeared in Logan Likes Mary Anne! He has a southern accent, participates in many sports, and works as a busboy at the Rosebud Café, and the library. He is an associate member of the club, which is a member who is not required to come to meetings, which he takes because he feels uncomfortable with girls, but takes jobs when no regular member is available. Logan lives with his parents, younger sister Kerry, and younger brother Hunter. He is also Mary Anne's boyfriend, although they temporarily split up, but eventually got back together. However, in The Baby-Sitters Club Friends Forever: Mary Anne's Big Breakup, they break up for good.

Logan is played by Eric Lawton in the HBO series, Rian McCririck in the Netflix series, and Austin O'Brien in the film adaptation.

=== Shannon Louisa Kilbourne ===
- Club Position: Associate Member
- Appearance: White, blonde hair, blue eyes
- Birthday: March 17
- Age: 13

Shannon is an overachiever who is involved in many extracurricular activities, and is the only member who doesn't attend Stoneybrook Middle School; she instead goes to Stoneybrook Day School, which is a private school. She first appears in Kristy and the Snobs. She lives in Watson's neighborhood. She has two younger sisters, Tiffany and Maria, and is Kristy's first friend in her new neighborhood, although initially, Kristy thought she was a snob. She is an associate member because she is too busy to come to meetings. However, when Dawn temporarily left the club, she filled Dawn's place as an alternate officer. Once Dawn returned, she went back to the position of associate member. After the death of Kristy's beloved collie, Louie, Shannon gave Kristy one of Astrid's (a Bernese Mountain Dog) puppies, which David Michael named after Shannon.

== Stoneybrook ==
Stoneybrook is a fictional suburban town in the state of Connecticut. It is the hometown of many of the characters in both The Baby-Sitters Club series and the Baby-Sitters Little Sister series as well.

The town is near Stamford, Connecticut. Several adults in the town commute to Stamford, and Jessi takes her ballet classes there.

Stoneybrook's known public schools include Stoneybrook Elementary, Stoneybrook Middle School, and Stoneybrook High School, as well as Kelsey Middle School. Private schools include Stoneybrook Academy (which Karen Brewer and several other charges attended) and Stoneybrook Day School, which is where associate member Shannon attends.

Karen's father and Kristy's stepfather, Watson Brewer, owns a mansion in an upscale subdivision of Stoneybrook. The families of Hannie and Linnie Papadakis, Amanda and Max Delaney, and Shannon Kilbourne also live there.

Karen's mother, Lisa, and stepfather, Seth Engle, reside in a regular middle-class neighborhood, as does the family of Nancy Dawes. Most of the club members also live in a middle-class neighborhood. When Stacey returned to Stoneybrook, she moved into the house behind Mallory's, so whenever she came outside, her backyard would face Mallory's house. Bradford Court, where Claudia lives (and at the beginning of the series, where Mary Anne and Kristy lived also) is within walking distance of almost all of their houses and of Stoneybrook Middle School. After Mary Anne's father, Richard, marries Dawn's mother, Sharon, they move into Sharon and Dawn's house on Burnt Hill Road.

== Novels ==
=== Super Specials and Readers' Requests ===
- Super Specials: Super Specials were an extended version of the regular series, with several members of the Baby-Sitters Club (plus at times, their friends and/or sitting charges) narrating (chapter-by-chapter changes of narrators). Super Specials centered on a larger-scale plot, usually with at least three subplots. For example, in The Baby-Sitters Club Super Special #7, Snowbound, some members of the Baby-Sitters Club are babysitting when a snowstorm hits Stoneybrook and the larger area, and the others are spread out. Dawn is stuck at the airport waiting for Jeff with her mother Sharon, Jessi is stuck at her ballet class, Mary Anne and Mallory are stuck with the latter's family, and Kristy is stuck at home with Bart (Kristy's boyfriend). The members narrate their experiences and usually, the next chapter would bring on an entirely different plot or an extension of the previous chapter, only with a different narrator.
- Readers' Requests: These were special novels featuring associate members Logan Bruno and Shannon Kilbourne, and their personal lives away from the Baby-Sitters Club.

=== Mysteries and Super Mysteries ===
- Mysteries: These resemble the style of the regular novels (single narrator), only the plot of the novel mainly focuses on solving a mystery, with a small subplot.
- Super Mysteries: These resembled the style of the Super Specials, with multiple narrators, only the plot of the novel was mainly focused on solving a mystery, with a few small subplots.

=== Portrait Collections (1994–1997) ===
- Portrait Collections: These are autobiographies of the Baby-Sitters Club members (Stacey, Claudia, Dawn, Mary Anne, Kristy, and Abby). Mallory and Jessi were not included because the autobiographies were an eighth-grade project only.

=== The Baby-Sitters Club: Friends Forever (1999–2000) ===
- The Baby-Sitters Club: Friends Forever: These novels are an extension of the original series, which focused on the original four members (Kristy, Mary Anne, Claudia, and Stacey). They were set following the fire at Mary Anne's house, which drastically impacted the lives of the Baby-Sitters Club members and concluded with a final Super Special detailing the older club members' graduation from Stoneybrook Middle School.

=== The Baby-Sitters Club: Reissue and The Summer Before ===
- The Baby-Sitters Club: Reissue and The Summer Before depict the lives of Kristy, Mary Anne, Claudia, and Stacey the summer before the school year began.

== Spin-offs ==
=== Baby-Sitters Little Sister ===
The Baby-Sitters Little Sister novels are a series of novels for younger readers. They center on Karen Brewer, Kristy's seven-year-old stepsister. One hundred and twenty-two Baby-Sitters Little Sister novels and six Baby-Sitters Little Sister Super Special novels have been published. The series ran from 1988 to 2000.

=== The Kids in Ms. Colman's Class ===
The Kids in Ms. Colman's Class series is a spin-off of the Baby-Sitters Little Sister series, and cover Karen Brewer's second grade classmates at Stoneybrook Academy, and their adventures in Ms. Colman's classroom. Twelve novels have been published, and the series ran from 1995 to 1998. The titles are Teacher's Pet, Author Day, Class Play, Second Grade Baby, The Snow War, Twin Trouble, Science Fair, Summer School, Halloween Parade, Holiday Time, Spelling Bee, and Baby Animal Zoo.

=== California Diaries ===
The California Diaries series centers on Dawn Schafer and her friends after her return to California, and target a slightly older audience, with a darker feel. Fifteen novels have been published, focusing on the characters Dawn, Ducky McCrae, Amalia Vargas, Maggie Blume, and Sunny Winslow. Examples of subjects dealt with are racism, anorexia, and sexual orientation, along with the characters' personal problems and family disputes.

== Graphic novels ==
In 2006, Graphix, a division of Scholastic, released a graphic novel version of the first novel, Kristy's Great Idea. The adaptation is illustrated by Raina Telgemeier, an Eisner Award-winning author and illustrator. The series continued with the release of The Truth About Stacey and Mary Anne Saves the Day, and concluded with Claudia and Mean Janine.

Since then, four more graphic novels for The Baby-Sitters Club were released, adapted and illustrated by Gale Galligan. Dawn and the Impossible Three was published in 2017, Kristy's Big Day in 2018, Boy-Crazy Stacey in 2019, and Logan Likes Mary Anne in 2020.

In 2019, it was announced that, starting 2021, six more graphic novels would be published, two per year: "Cartoonists Gabriela Epstein [...] and Chan Chau [...] will alternate as adapters of four of the books. Illustrator/adaptors for the final two books will be announced at a later date." Claudia and the New Girl, illustrated by Gabriela Epstein, was published on February 2, 2021; Kristy and the Snobs, illustrated by Chan Chau, on September 7, 2021; and Good-bye Stacey, Good-bye, illustrated by Gabriela Epstein, on February 1, 2022. Jessi's Secret Language, illustrated by Chan Chau, was published on September 6, 2022; Mary Anne's Bad Luck Mystery, illustrated by Cynthia Yuan Cheng, on December 27, 2022; and Stacey's Mistake, illustrated by Ellen T. Crenshaw, on October 3, 2023.

Claudia and the Bad Joke, adapted by Arley Nopra, was released on December 26, 2023, along with Mallory and the Trouble with Twins, which was released on March 4, 2025. Kristy and the Walking Disaster, adapted by Ellen T. Crenshaw, was published on September 17, 2024.

On April 30, 2019, it was announced that there are plans for a series of Baby-Sitters Little Sister graphic novels illustrated by Katy Farina and colored by Braden Lamb. The first graphic novel, Karen's Witch, was released on December 26, 2019. This was followed by Karen's Roller Skates, released July 7, 2020, and Karen's Worst Day, released December 29, 2020. Karen's Kittycat Club was released on July 20, 2021; Karen's School Picture, on February 1, 2022; Karen's Birthday, on January 3, 2023; Karen's Haircut, on July 4, 2023; and Karen's Sleepover, on May 7, 2024.

Karen's Grandmothers, adapted by DK Yingst, was released on October 1, 2024. Karen's Prize, adapted by Shauna J. Grant, was published on April 1, 2025.

Braden Lamb is the colorist for both The Baby-Sitters Club graphic novels and the Baby-Sitters Little Sister graphic novels.

== TV series ==
In 1990, The Baby-Sitters Club spawned a 13-episode TV series that aired on HBO and the Disney Channel, and was later released on video.

In 2018, plans for a new TV series by Walden Media and Michael De Luca were announced. In February 2019 it was announced that Netflix ordered a new version of the TV series, released on July 3, 2020. It was canceled on March 11, 2022.

== Film ==
A film based on The Baby-Sitters Club novels was released in 1995. It starred Schuyler Fisk, Rachael Leigh Cook, Larisa Oleynik, Bre Blair, Tricia Joe, Zelda Harris, and Stacy Linn Ramsower.

== Soundtrack ==
The Baby-Sitters Club: Songs for My Best Friends

Soundtrack album by Leslie Spiro
- Released: October 13, 1992
- Length: 40:56
- Label: Warner Bros.
- Producers: Jeff Barry, Richard Goldsmith

Professional ratings
Review scores
Source	Rating
AllMusic	2.5/5 stars

The Baby-Sitters Club: Songs for My Best Friends was a soundtrack for the series that was released on October 13, 1992, on CD and cassette tape. It included nine tracks written specifically for the series and the theme song to the original 1990 TV series.

=== Track listing ===
Track listing adapted from AllMusic. All tracks performed by Leslie Spiro.

All tracks are written by Jeff Barry, Kelly Sachs, and Leslie Spiro, except where noted.

No.	Title	Writer(s)	Length
1.	"Dance"		3:55
2.	"Good Time"		3:56
3.	"In Your Shoes"		4:56
4.	"Him"		3:48
5.	"We Will Inherit the Earth"		4:32
6.	"Dear Diary"		4:12
7.	"Telephone Talk"		4:44
8.	"School Is Cool"		4:15
9.	"Slumber Party"		3:42
10.	"Say Hello to Your Friends"	Glen Roven	3:12
Total length:			40:56

=== Personnel ===
Personnel adapted from liner notes.

- Jeff Barry - producer, songwriter
- Deborah Forte - executive producer
- Richard Goldsmith - producer
- Bobby Huff - arrangement, programming
- Glen Roven - songwriter
- Kelly Sachs - background vocals, songwriter
- Leslie Spiro - lead vocals, background vocals, songwriter
- Mark Spiro - arrangement, mixing, programming, recording
