= The Baby-Sitters Club (1990 TV series) =

- Genre: Children's television series
- Based on: The Baby-Sitters Club by Ann M. Martin
- Written by: Jeanne Betancourt; Ann M. Martin; Mary Pleshette Willis
- Directed by: Noel Black; Lynn Hamrick
- Starring: Meghan Andrews; Melissa Chasse; Jeni F. Winslow; Avriel Hillman; Meghan Lahey; Nicole Leach; Jessica Prunell
- Opening theme: "Say Hello to Your Friends", performed by: Emily Bindiger
- Ending theme: "Say Hello to Your Friends", performed by: Emily Bindiger
- Composer: Glen Roven
- Country of origin: United States
- Original language: English
- No. of seasons: 1
- No. of episodes: 13

Production
- Executive producer: Deborah Forte
- Producer: Tina Stern
- Cinematography: Nancy Schreiber
- Running time: 27 minutes
- Production companies: Amber Films, Ltd.; Scholastic Productions

Original release
- Network: Direct-to-video (episodes 1-4); HBO (episodes 5-13)
- Release: August 15, 1990 – February 3, 1993

The Baby-Sitters Club is an American live-action television series based on Ann M. Martin's children's novel series of the same name. The series, which aired from August 15, 1990 to February 3, 1993, started out as a direct-to-video series before moving to HBO, and was produced by Scholastic Productions.

== Broadcast and syndication ==
The first four episodes of The Baby-Sitters Club were released exclusively on VHS by GoodTimes Home Video in August 1990 and August 1991. The series then moved to HBO, where nine episodes premiered as monthly specials from November 1991 to February 1993. The series was later rerun on Disney Channel, from early October 1994 to January 1997. The series was also broadcast in Australia through the Australian Broadcasting Corporation on its afternoon programming block for kids and teens known as "The Afternoon Show" from 1993 to 1997.

== Cast ==
=== Main ===
- Meghan Andrews as Mallory Pike
- Melissa Chasse as Dawn Schafer
- Jeni F. Winslow as Claudia Kishi
- Avriel Hillman as Kristy Thomas
- Meghan Lahey as Mary Anne Spier
- Nicole Leach as Jessica "Jessi" Ramsey
- Jessica Prunell as Stacey McGill

=== Recurring ===
- Daniel Tamberelli as Jackie Rodowsky
- Gina Gallagher as Charlotte Johannsen

== Episodes ==
No.	Title	Directed by	Written by	Original release date
1	"Mary Anne and the Brunettes"	Abbie H. Fink & Carol S. Fink	Mary Pleshette Willis	August 15, 1990
Mary Anne is devastated when someone tries to steal Logan from her.
2	"Dawn and the Haunted House"	Abbie H. Fink & Carol S. Fink	Mary Pleshette Willis	August 15, 1990
Dawn thinks that Mrs. Slade is a witch but wonders if Claudia's odd behavior has something to do with it.
3	"Stacey's Big Break"	Lynn Hamrick	Mary Pleshette Willis	August 1, 1991
Stacey is asked to become a model but finds that it is a lot harder than she expected.
4	"Kristy and the Great Campaign"	Lynn Hamrick	Eileen Cowel	August 1, 1991
Kristy decides to help a shy girl run for class president.
5	"The Baby-Sitters' Special Christmas"	Lynn Hamrick	Mary Pleshette Willis	December 1, 1991
At The Baby-Sitters Club Christmas party, Stacey begins eating sweets and ends up in the hospital.
6	"Claudia and the Missing Jewels"	Lynn Hamrick	Mary Pleshette Willis	November 2, 1991
Claudia's new homemade jewelry disappears.
7	"Dawn and the Dream Boy"	Lynn Hamrick	Mary Pleshette Willis	January 2, 1992
Dawn has a crush on a boy and accuses Mary Anne of flirting with him.
8	"Claudia and the Mystery of the Secret Passage"	Lynn Hamrick	Jeanne Betancourt	September 2, 1992
Claudia discovers a note in the secret passage at Dawn's house.
9	"Jessi and the Mystery of the Stolen Secrets"	Lynn Hamrick	Jeanne Betancourt	October 1, 1992
Jessi investigates when various people's secrets are being found out all over Stoneybrook.
10	"The Baby-Sitters and the Boy-Sitters"	Lynn Hamrick	Mary Pleshette Willis	November 2, 1992
A group of boys want to join The Baby-Sitters Club.
11	"Dawn Saves the Trees"	Noel Black	Mary Pleshette Willis	November 30, 1992
Dawn wants to save trees that may be destroyed by a new development in Stoneybrook.
12	"Stacey Takes a Stand"	Noel Black	Jeanne Betancourt	January 3, 1993
Stacey's father wants her to attend school in New York, and she is forced to choose between her two homes.
13	"The Baby-Sitters Remember"	Noel Black	Mary Pleshette Willis	February 3, 1993
The Baby-Sitters Club members recall their favorite memories at a sleepover.

== Home media ==
The series was released between June 16, 1993 and July 27, 1994 on thirteen individual VHS tapes each containing one episode. The entire series was released to Amazon streaming services on December 13, 2013 with other streaming services following on May 20, 2014.
