= Followers (2000 film) =

- Directed by: Jonathan M. Flicker
- Produced by: Jonathan M. Flicker
- Starring: Sam Trammell; Eddie Robinson; Mark Dobies; Jessica Prunell
- Cinematography: William M. Miller
- Edited by: Jonathan M. Flicker
- Music by: Joe Kurasz
- Distributed by: Castle Hill Productions
- Release date: October 13, 2000
- Country: United States
- Language: English
- Box office: $4,841

Followers is a 2000 American drama film written and directed by Jonathan M. Flicker. It was produced by Castle Hill Productions. The plot focuses on three college students who attempt to join a fraternity but soon find the fraternity president to be extremely racist. Flicker said he based Followers on news reports of a racial hazing incident at Rider University in 1993.

Followers was filmed over 24 days in March 1996. The film was given a limited release on October 13, 2000.

== Plot ==
John Dietrich is a freshman at Harrington University, having moved there from Nebraska. He becomes close friends with students Steven Trayer and Allen Phillips. The trio, especially John and Allen, aspire to join the most popular and exclusive fraternity on campus, Kappa Psi Lambda. Allen has a leg up into joining the frat because his father was a brother in the same organization. John begins to idolize the charming fraternity president, Jake Tyler, who is also captain of the football team and an academic star. The trio’s tight-knit friendship becomes fractured when John and Allen receive bids from the fraternity, but Steve, who is Black, does not. Jake targets Steve through a series of dangerous and racially motivated hazing incidents aimed at testing the loyalty of John and Allen. John is caught between his loyalty to Steve and his desire to belong in the fraternity.

== Cast ==
- Sam Trammell as John Dietrich
- Eddie T. Robinson as Steven Trayer
- Mark Dobies as Jake Tyler
- Jessica Prunell as Cynthia Gordon
- Jerry Laurino as Allen Phillips

== Critical reception ==
Lawrence Van Gelder of The New York Times wrote, "Written, directed and edited by Jonathan M. Flicker, Followers is a cautionary tale worth telling to college students with the potential to figure in the annual headlines about fraternity excesses. And its lessons about the cost of remaining passive in the face of evil, of countenancing bigotry and of betraying friends bear reinforcement in any season. But while clearly rooted in pervasive truths, Followers…suffers from clumsy exposition and uneven acting, except in the case of Eddie T. Robinson."
