= Nicole Leach =

American jazz musician

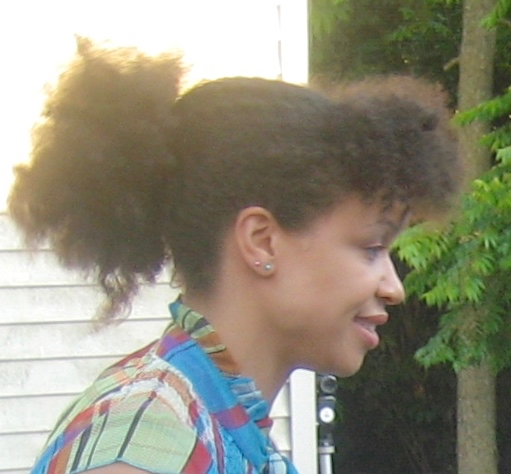
- Rochelle in 2009
- Born: Nicolle Rochelle; May 10, 1978 (age 48)
- Occupations: Actress, singer, dancer
- Years active: 1988–present
- Website: www.nicollerochelle.com

Nicolle Rochelle, often credited professionally as Nicole Leach, is an American actress, dancer, and jazz singer, best known for her appearances on television including Shining Time Station, The Babysitters Club, and made for television movies The Vernon Johns Story starring James Earl Jones and after school special Summertime Switch.

== Early life ==
Rochelle grew up in West Orange and Montclair, New Jersey. She attended Montclair High School, and graduated early after three years and went on to earn her Linguistic Anthropology degree from Brown University.

== Career ==
Rochelle has appeared in several TV shows, usually under the name "Nicole Leach", including the first season of Shining Time Station with former Beatles member Ringo Starr as the granddaughter of the workshop's operator, several episodes of The Babysitters Club series, and four episodes of The Cosby Show as a friend of the youngest Huxtable child. She also had guest roles on Nickelodeon's Clarissa Explains It All as "Olivia DuPris", Where in the World is Carmen Sandiego, Third Watch, and Law & Order.

Rochelle has performed on and off-Broadway in such shows as Dangerous Games, Fame on 42nd Street, Miracle Brothers, and a 2004 production of Limonade Tous le Jours starring Alan Alda. In 2003 she played Katherine in Shakespeare in the Park's Henry V. In 2005, she played the title role in the musical Nefertiti in Fort Lauderdale. Rochelle starred in role of the new Josephine Baker in the musical A la recherche de Josephine, produced by Jérôme Savary, in Paris and touring Europe and the US from 2006 to 2010.

Starting in 2010, Rochelle has toured internationally with the French electro-swing group "Ginkgoa", French musician/singer/songwriter Julien Brunetaud with their blues/jazz group "Nikki & Jules", and been invited to sing with bands across the world from Austria to Germany, Ukraine to Hungary, Argentina, Switzerland to the US, and is currently releasing her new artist/activist project called "Modern GEAIsha", hip-hop fusion music with a message,

== Benefit ==
In 1995, while still in high school, Rochelle participated in a musical to benefit the fight against HIV/AIDS.

== Legal issues ==
On April 9, 2018, Leach was arrested and charged for disorderly conduct after jumping a barrier fence during a protest at Montgomery County courthouse in Norristown, Pennsylvania for the first day of Cosby's sexual assault retrial. She was topless and her body was covered with the writing "Women’s Lives Matter" and the names of the comedian's accusers. Leach jumped over when Cosby was close to the courthouse's entrance just before 9am ET, with security apprehending her afterwards. Cosby, along with spokesperson Andrew Wyatt, was blindsided and had a slight reaction while Wyatt was shocked in surprise. Leach had planned to attend other trial protests that day but was recommended by authorities not to and said that her intention was to make Cosby uncomfortable and that because she used to look up to him that his actions towards others had "felt personal to me."

== Filmography ==
Film and television
Year	Title	Role	Notes
1989–1991	Shining Time Station	Tanya Cupper	Starring role, season 1
1990	Tales from the Darkside: The Movie	Margaret	Segment: "Lover's Vow"
1990	Shining Time Station: 'Tis a Gift	Tanya Cupper	TV movie
1990–1992	The Cosby Show	Danielle	4 episodes
1990–1993	The Baby-Sitters Club	Jessica Ramsey	Main cast
1993	Where in the World is Carmen Sandiego?	The Shadow	Various episodes throughout Season 3
1993	Clarissa Explains It All	Olivia DuPris	4 episodes
1994	The Vernon Johns Story	Baby Dee	TV movie
1994	Summertime Switch	Christine	TV movie
1996	NYPD Blue	Shirelle McClintock	Episode: "The Backboard Jungle"
1996	Swift Justice	Larraine	Episode: "Takin' Back the Streets"
1996	Law & Order	Liana Rogers	Episode: "Pro Se"
2001	Someone like You	Nia	
2001	Law & Order	Mari	Episode "White Lie"
2002	The Life		Short film
2002	Third Watch	Regina	Episode: "Thicker Than Water"
2003	Law & Order: Special Victims Unit	Sarah Rendell	Episode: "Shaken"
2005	Law & Order: Trial by Jury	Catherine Selles	Episode: "Day"
2006	25 to Life	Det. Mendoza	Video game; voice role
2006	Chappelle's Show	Dave's Ex	Episode: "3.1"
2007	Adrift in Manhattan	Melanie	
2010	La maison des Rocheville	Josy	TV miniseries
2013	Jo	Nurse Hydrotherapy	TV series
2016	Research Unit	Clémence Maillezais	Episode: "Noces rouges"
