= List of The Baby-sitters Little Sister novels =

This article contains the titles of novels in Baby-Sitters Little Sister, a children's book series created by Ann M. Martin.

== Regular series ==
1. Karen's Witch: Karen thinks her next door neighbor, Mrs. Porter, is a witch named Morbidda Destiny. Ghostwriter: Stephanie Calmenson.
2. Karen's Roller Skates: Karen breaks her wrist after losing her balance on her new roller skates and needs to get a cast. Ghostwriter: Stephanie Calmenson.
3. Karen's Worst Day: Karen is having a bad luck day. Will it be her worst day ever?
4. Karen's Kittycat Club: Karen creates a cat club and invites two friends, Hannie and Amanda, to join. However, Nancy does not have a cat, and therefore she does not let her join. This causes Nancy to feel angry. Meanwhile, Hannie and Amanda do not get along.
5. Karen's School Picture: It's school picture day in two weeks, but Karen has to get glasses.
6. Karen's Little Sister: Karen loves her little sister Emily Michelle, but sometimes Emily Michelle gets a lot of attention, which makes Karen jealous.
7. Karen's Birthday: It's Karen's birthday! She can't wait for all those presents. Karen is even having two parties, one at Daddy's house and one at Mommy's. But what Karen really wants for her birthday is one party, with her whole family together.
8. Karen's Haircut: Hannie is going to marry a boy named Scott Hsu. Karen gets a haircut for it, but Hannie doesn't like the hairstyle. Will Karen still be able to be in the wedding?
9. Karen's Sleepover: Karen is going to have a sleepover and she invites all the girls in her class, including a new girl named Pamela, who isn't fun to be around.
10. Karen's Grandmothers: Karen has four grandmothers! When Ms. Colman tells her class that they are going to adopt a grandparent, she adopts a grandmother and now has five.
11. Karen's Prize: Karen's class has a spelling bee and she keeps winning them. However, everyone thinks that Karen is just showing off, especially Hannie and Nancy. Ghostwriter: Stephanie Calmenson.
12. Karen's Ghost: Karen and Kristy are convinced that the ghost of Ben Brewer is haunting them.
13. Karen's Surprise: All the students in Ms. Colman's class, including Karen, participate in a Thanksgiving play.
14. Karen's New Year: Once Karen hears about New Year's resolutions, she makes sure everyone makes them and keeps theirs.
15. Karen's in Love: Karen and Ricky like each other so much that they get married!
16. Karen's Goldfish: Karen and her little brother have new pets, goldfish. Karen is thrilled to have a goldfish of her own, until it dies. She goes into mourning, wearing black Reeboks and a dark veil to school. She even plans an elaborate funeral. Then her neighbor, Mrs. Porter, does something to make her feel better.
17. Karen's Brothers: Karen's stepbrothers, Charlie, Sam, and David Michael pick on Karen now more than ever!
18. Karen's Home Run: During practice for Kristy's Krushers, Karen hits a home run! But unfortunately for Karen, during games she is striking out a lot. How will she participate in the upcoming parade? Ghostwriter: Stephanie Calmenson.
19. Karen's Good-bye: Karen's friend Amanda Delaney moves away to another town! Karen is sad, but Hannie thinks that Amanda is a spoiled brat. Will she see Amanda again? Ghostwriter: Stephanie Calmenson.
20. Karen's Carnival: Can Karen, Hannie, and Nancy run a carnival in Karen's front yard?
21. Karen's New Teacher: Ms. Colman needs to go to the hospital and Mrs. Hoffman comes. Karen does not like her new teacher at first, and wants Ms. Colman to come back soon!
22. Karen's Little Witch: Karen discovers Mrs. Porter has a granddaughter named Druscilla. Is she a witch, too? Ghostwriter: Stephanie Calmenson.
23. Karen's Doll: Karen gets a new doll from London. Then Nancy has to go to the hospital. So Karen sends her new doll for a visit and Nancy thinks that Karen sent her the doll as a gift to keep. Ghostwriter: Stephanie Calmenson.
24. Karen's School Trip: After learning about wild animals, Karen, along with her classmates, are excited to see the real live creatures. Unfortunately, Ms. Colman may have to cancel the field trip to the zoo when everyone in the class starts coming down with the flu. Will the class trip be cancelled, or will it go ahead?
25. Karen's Pen Pal: Karen has made up some white lies to her pen pal Maxie. Now Maxie is coming to visit and Karen is in big trouble.
26. Karen's Ducklings: Karen, Hannie, and Nancy see newborn ducklings and send them off with their mother.
27. Karen's Big Joke: Karen loves April Fools' Day. This is when she gets to play tricks on her friends. First she squirts Pamela with a fake camera. Then she puts a plastic cockroach in Bobby's shoe. But now she has come up with a joke to play on her whole big house family. Could this be her best joke ever? Or is she in for a big surprise?
28. Karen's Tea Party: Karen and David Michael have the worst table manners ever. Karen burps at the dinner table, and David Michael makes rude noises with his armpit. Then Karen's daddy sends them to charm school, and Karen makes a complete turnaround. David Michael, on the other hand, is a different story. Ghostwriter: Stephanie Calmenson.
29. Karen's Cartwheel: Karen has to learn how to do a cartwheel for the big gymnastics presentation.
30. Karen's Kittens: After finding a cat who is just about to have kittens, Karen lets it stay in the den. Then Karen tries to find homes for the kittens.
31. Karen's Bully: When class bully Bobby Gianelli (who picks on Karen at recess) moves to her neighbourhood, Karen decides to fight back. Ghostwriter:
32. Karen's Pumpkin Patch: Who will find the best pumpkin for Halloween? Will it be Karen?
33. Karen's Secret: Natalie, a classmate of Karen, tells Karen a secret about herself. Soon, it gets passed to the entire class. Ghostwriter: Stephanie Calmenson.
34. Karen's Snow Day: After helping her brothers shovel snow, Karen decides to start a snow shoveling business. But when she gets in over her head in the snow shoveling business, it's up to her and her friends to find a way to dig themselves out.
35. Karen's Doll Hospital: When Karen's favorite doll, Hyacynthia, has to go to the toy shop for repairs, Karen decides to start her own hospital for "sick" dolls. Ghostwriter: Stephanie Calmenson.
36. Karen's New Friend: There's a new girl in Karen's class who needs to use a wheelchair. Karen thinks Addie is lonely, so she decides that Addie is her new best friend.
37. Karen's Tuba: Karen's class gets to learn how to play instruments. But then Karen is the last person to get an instrument. What will she get?
38. Karen's Big Lie: Karen copies off of Ricky's paper and then lies about it. Then the lie gets bigger and bigger.
39. Karen's Wedding: Ms. Colman's getting married and Karen gets to be the flower girl until Ms.Colman's niece comes. What will happen now?
40. Karen's Newspaper: Karen, Hannie, and Nancy make a newspaper containing information that they weren't supposed to know.
41. Karen's School: Karen plays school with Andrew and Emily Michelle; however, everyone thinks Karen is being mean.
42. Karen's Pizza Party: Karen becomes Pizza Queen and gets to wear a crown, be on a billboard, and star in a Pizza Express commercial.
43. Karen's Toothache: Karen's tooth begins to hurt. When she visits the dentist, she realizes she has to have the tooth pulled!
44. Karen's Big Weekend: Karen and her family visit New York City. Ghostwriter: Stephanie Calmenson.
45. Karen's Twin: Karen thought there was only one of herself, but she finds out that she is wrong.
46. Karen's Baby-sitter: Karen and Andrew have a new babysitter - it's Bart Taylor! Bart is so much fun. When Bart babysits, they have fun. They go sledding, build snow forts, and even do Winter Olympics. Karen likes Bart so much, she decides that she is in love with him.
47. Karen's Kite: Karen's class has a kite flying contest. Then Natalie and Karen have a fight, and everyone seems to be on Natalie's side. Ghostwriter: Stephanie Calmenson.
48. Karen's Two Families: Karen and Andrew are sad that they only get to see their father and stepmother two weekends out of each month. So after a yes from both parents, they begin switching houses every other month.
49. Karen's Stepmother: When Karen begins spending more time at the big house, her stepmother tells her that she is responsible for chores. Karen begins to think of Elizabeth as a wicked stepmother. Will she adjust to the new living arrangements?
50. Karen's Lucky Penny: Karen finds a penny on the sidewalk and uses it for luck.
51. Karen's Big Top: Karen's dreams come true when she gets to attend circus camp and to practice everything from costume making to animal training - she even learns about tightrope walking! However, after she becomes friends with the daughter of the circus owner, she learns how hard travelling around the country really is. Ghostwriter: Stephanie Calmenson.
52. Karen's Mermaid: Karen's little house family and the Pikes go to Sea City together. Karen gets together with Margo Pike. Karen tells her she saw a real mermaid so Margo and her brother Nicky and sister Vanessa play a trick on Karen by writing notes to her to make her think it was from a mermaid.
53. Karen's School Bus: Karen rides the bus with Hannie now. But after throwing up on the first day, Karen's nervous about riding school buses after people teases her. Ghostwriter: Stephanie Calmenson.
54. Karen's Candy: Karen, Hannie, and Nancy, the "Three Musketeers," enter a local candy store's Halloween fundraising contest and are certain of their victory until they discover that Pamela and Leslie, the team members of the "Milky Ways," are also contestants.
55. Karen's Magician: Karen and Andrew love magic, especially after they see Mr. Wizard perform. Andrew is tricked into believing his special penny has disappeared forever, until they team up and learn the truth about magic. Ghostwriter: Stephanie Calmenson.
56. Karen's Ice Skates: Karen got an early Christmas present from Granny and Grandad - new ice skates! Karen can't wait to try them out. However, the ice on the pond is not ready for skating. But Karen and her friends go look at the ice anyway. However, when they do, something terrible happens. Ghostwriter: Stephanie Calmenson.
57. Karen's School Mystery: Karen and Addie are elected to be on safety patrol. Karen is so proud to wear her badge and help keep the halls safe. But things are being stolen all over the school. Can Karen and Addie catch the thieves?
58. Karen's Ski Trip: Karen thought skiing was going to be fun - until she realized how difficult it is and noticed that her younger brother, Andrew, is better at skiing than she is. Will she learn how to ski and be able to enjoy it? Ghostwriter: Stephanie Calmenson.
59. Karen's Leprechaun: Karen thinks that she saw a real leprechaun. Ghostwriter: Stephanie Calmenson.
60. Karen's Pony: Karen rescues a sad, old pony named Blueberry from an "everything must go" estate sale, then has to find a way to keep him.
61. Karen's Tattletale: Karen's little brother Andrew is continuously getting her in trouble.
62. Karen's New Bike: Karen is learning all about bike safety in school. She is even going to enter a bike-a-thon. But Karen's bike is too small for her. Karen, with her father's help, buys a new bike. Then her new bike is stolen. Can she catch the thief and get her bike back? Ghostwriter: Stephanie Calmenson.
63. Karen's Movie: Karen's grandad is sick. Karen wants to do something nice to cheer him up. So, she makes a movie for him. All Karen's friends are going to star in her movie. However, after problems occur on set, her friends are mad at her. What will she do? Ghostwriter: Stephanie Calmenson.
64. Karen's Lemonade Stand: Frustrated by the failure of her lemonade stand business, Karen decides to sell lemonade during softball practice instead of in front of her house. Kristy, however, fears that the Krushers are spending more time with lemonade than on the field. Ghostwriter: Stephanie Calmenson.
65. Karen's Toys: Karen's mother and stepfather won't allow toy guns in the house, but she buys them for Andrew and herself to use at their father's house. Ghostwriter: Stephanie Calmenson.
66. Karen's Monsters: Karen's stepbrother, Charlie, is building a very scary monster for the Halloween parade. Then the monster disappears, and Karen thinks it came to life.
67. Karen's Turkey Day: Anticipating all the Thanksgiving festivities, including a visit by her grandparents and a trip to see the New York City parade, Karen fears things are going from bad to worse when her grandad gets sick and her parents become occupied with grownup things. Ghostwriter: Stephanie Calmenson.
68. Karen's Angel: The angel Karen and Andrew chose for the tree costs more money than they expected, and then the angel breaks. Now Karen and Andrew have no angel and no money - can Karen find a new one in time for Christmas? Ghostwriter: Stephanie Calmenson.
69. Karen's Big Sister: Jealous when her father gives her stepsister Kristy a very special heirloom pin, Karen borrows the pin without permission and is horrified when she accidentally loses it in the snow. What will she do? Ghostwriter: Stephanie Calmenson.
70. Karen's Grandad: Karen wants to spend more time with her grandfather before he dies. Ghostwriter: Stephanie Calmenson.
71. Karen's Island Adventure: Karen's excited to be spending spring break at a resort in the Caribbean. But when she tries to befriend Sandy, the only other seven-year-old there, she's discouraged. Sandy participates in only quiet activities and seems to reject Karen's attempts at friendship. But when she learns why Sandy seems so unfriendly, Karen works hard to prove that she can be understanding. Ghostwriter: Stephanie Calmenson.
72. Karen's New Puppy: When Seth's dog, Midgie, runs away, he gets Sadie, a new puppy who's adorable - but out of control. Sadie isn't trained, doesn't get along with Rocky, and requires a lot of work. Will things work out for Sadie? Or will she have to be given away? Ghostwriter: Stephanie Calmenson.
73. Karen's Dinosaur: Anticipating a trip to New York City, where her class will visit the museum on the same day as her pen pal's class, Karen fears the trip will be spoiled for her by David Michael, who is furious that his class cannot go on the trip as well.
74. Karen's Softball Mystery: What's happening to Kristy's Krushers? It's up to Karen to find out! Ghostwriter: Stephanie Calmenson.
75. Karen's County Fair: Enjoying caring for Ollie the lamb above all other activities at farm camp, Karen diligently feeds and brushes him. She decides to enter Ollie in the county fair, despite the reservations of others.
76. Karen's Magic Garden: Karen's family is having a reunion in Maine. Karen meets her cousin Diana for the first time. Diana is a lot of fun. Together the cousins explore the old house. They even find a hidden garden. Karen and Diana fix up the garden. Soon it looks beautiful. Special things happen when they are there. Could the garden be magical too?
77. Karen's School Surprise: Ms. Colman has a big surprise. Karen's class is going to be on a TV quiz show! School Stars is a show with school questions and silly stunts. Karen's class is very excited. Karen and her friends practice a lot. Karen thinks they are great. But will they win the grand prize? Ghostwriter: Stephanie Calmenson.
78. Karen's Half Birthday: Teased by her peers because she is the youngest student in the class, Karen throws a party to celebrate turning seven-and-a-half with half a cake, half-filled goody bags, and games played halfway. Unfortunately, her friends do not like the party especially playing games halfway. They even feel that she is being bossy. Ghostwriter: Stephanie Calmenson.
79. Karen's Big Fight: Karen argues with David Michael after he is briefly transferred to Stoneybrook Academy and put into Karen's class.
80. Karen's Christmas Tree: Karen and her friends decide to surprise a neighbour with a Christmas tree, but they have a huge fight that threatens the surprise. Ghostwriter: Stephanie Calmenson.
81. Karen's Accident: Karen falls out of a treehouse, and has a ruptured spleen and goes to the hospital.
82. Karen's Secret Valentine: Karen's class is having Secret Valentines. Hiding notes and gifts for a Secret Valentine will be fun. But then Karen picks Pamela, her enemy, as her Valentine. What will she do?
83. Karen's Bunny: Karen's grandmother is coming for a visit. She brings Karen and Andrew Easter baskets. Inside the baskets is a wonderful surprise - real live bunnies. Unfortunately, Karen's parents are upset, and the bunnies begin to destroy things. Will the bunnies be given away, or will Karen and Andrew be allowed to keep them?
84. Karen's Big Job: Karen is excited about "Take Our Daughters To Work Day". She will spend the morning with her stepmother and the afternoon with her father. It is fun at first. Karen gets to talk on the phone, make copies, and get a snack from the candy machine. Then Karen has to go to a meeting. It is not so much fun. Karen likes the office. But she cannot wait to go back to school!
85. Karen's Treasure: Stumbling upon an old map that says that there is a hidden treasure in her backyard, Karen follows the clues and finds an ancient box filled with old coins.
86. Karen's Telephone Trouble: Karen loves talking on the phone, chatting with her friends, and calling 900 numbers to hear jokes and her horoscope. But she finds herself in a mess when the phone bill arrives! Karen's father makes telephone rules for her. But she breaks them, and soon she is in a huge mess. Ghostwriter: Stephanie Calmenson.
87. Karen's Pony Camp: Karen, Nancy, and Hannie are going to pony camp. Karen cannot wait. Blueberry, the pony she once rescued, is even going to be there. Unfortunately, pony camp is not easy. The older campers tease Karen. Nancy is afraid. And Hannie spends too much time riding. Will Karen and her friends ever have fun at pony camp?
88. Karen's Puppet Show: Karen is excited that she is going to art camp. She cannot wait to make art projects. But Karen is mad at Hannie and Nancy. They are not going to art camp. While at camp, Karen works on a puppet show. She makes silly puppets that look like Hannie and Nancy. But then Hannie and Nancy buy tickets to the puppet show. Uh-oh. Now what is Karen going to do? Ghostwriter: Stephanie Calmenson.
89. Karen's Unicorn: Karen wonders if unicorns actually exist!
90. Karen's Haunted House: After Karen's class decorates a haunted house for Halloween, they begin to hear spooky noises. What could be causing the noises?
91. Karen's Pilgrim: After a visit to Plymouth Plantation, a recreated Pilgrim village, Karen comes up with a presentation for her school Thanksgiving project. Ghostwriter: Stephanie Calmenson.
92. Karen's Sleigh Ride: When the buildings on Mrs. Stone's farm burn down just before Christmas, Karen and her family and friends organize a large fundraiser to help her friend rebuild her buildings.
93. Karen's Cooking Contest: Karen's class is putting together a celebrity-family cookbook. Karen enters one of her grandmother's secret recipes - without permission - and learns a lesson in truthfulness.
94. Karen's Snow Princess: Stoneybrook is preparing for a special lighting ceremony at the winter carnival, and Karen has a plan to be the one chosen to throw the master switch. Ghostwriter: Stephanie Calmenson.
95. Karen's Promise: Karen's mother and stepfather have decided to move to Chicago for six months. Karen has promised Andrew she will stay with him no matter what. Karen must decide whether to stay in Stoneybrook or to go to Chicago with Andrew in order to keep her promise.
96. Karen's Big Move: Karen says goodbye to Ms. Colman's class and all of her friends before moving to Chicago; but, after a week away, she misses Stoneybrook so much that she decides to move back.
97. Karen's Paper Route: Karen really wants Moonbeam, the new video game system. But Daddy won't buy it for her. So Karen decides to get a job. She will help Kristy deliver newspapers. Ghostwriter: Stephanie Calmenson.
98. Karen's Fishing Trip: Karen's family decide to visit Shadow Lake, along with Nancy and Hannie. Karen, Hannie, and Nancy enjoy playing in their secret clubhouse, learning how to fish, telling stories around the campfire, and searching for the Shadow Lake Monster.
99. Karen's Big City Mystery: During Karen's month-long stay with her "little house" family in Chicago, she teams up with a new friend to nab an art thief.
100. Karen's Book: Karen decides to write an autobiography. However, she does not remember everything about being little. So she talks with Mommy and Daddy. They tell Karen all the funny things she did. Can she write a whole book? Ghostwriter: Stephanie Calmenson.
101. Karen's Chain Letter: Swept up in a stamp collecting craze, Karen sends a chain letter that will bring her stamps from all over the world.
102. Karen's Black Cat: Karen's family adopts a black kitten. Ghostwriter: Stephanie Calmenson.
103. Karen's Movie Star: A real movie is being filmed in Karen’s neighbourhood! Karen wants to befriend Allison Hunter, the eight-year-old star.
104. Karen's Christmas Carol: When Karen and her brother Andrew land parts in a local production of A Christmas Carol Karen discovers the real meaning of Christmas. Ghostwriter: Stephanie Calmenson.
105. Karen's Nanny: Mommy is starting a new job. She is looking for someone to take care of Karen and Andrew when she is not home. Karen and Andrew will help her. But finding a nanny is hard work. The first nanny is too nice. The second one is too strict. Will the third one be just right?
106. Karen's President: When Karen travels with her family to Washington, D.C., she hopes to meet the President, but everyone convinces her that he is too busy. Will her dream come true? Ghostwriter: Stephanie Calmenson.
107. Karen's Copycat: Karen is annoyed with Andrew. He won't stop copying her! But when their new nanny, Merry, teaches a pottery class, Karen is eager to prove that she is good at pottery. When she can't keep up, Karen passes off another student's work as her own.
108. Karen's Field Day: Karen, Hannie, and Nancy can't wait to compete with Pamela and her friends in outdoor games at Stoneybrook Academy's annual Field Day.
109. Karen's Show and Share: Karen doesn't want to be boring at the class's Show and Share, so she makes up a story about being related to Bobby Mason, the famous baseball star. Her white lie spins out of control when classmates ask for signed souvenirs and more information about the sports hero. What will happen when they find out that she lied?
110. Karen's Swim Meet: Karen joins the swim team. She loves dreaming about winning medals and learning how to swim fast. But mostly she likes to have fun with her friends on the team. Then the coach starts being mean. Can Karen find a way to be a winner and have fun, too? Ghostwriter: Stephanie Calmenson.
111. Karen's Spy Mystery: Nancy's family are on vacation, and their house-sitter, Bill Barnett, is acting strange. Using a clever snooping scheme, Karen catches Bill committing a crime.
112. Karen's New Holiday: With some help from her friends, Karen creates a new holiday, Augustania, a celebration of the end of summer that borrows favorite traditions from other holidays. However, they can't decide which parts are their favorites.
113. Karen's Hurricane: A hurricane is heading towards Connecticut, and Karen is fascinated to watch the weather reports about the storm that shares her name. Hurricane Karen hits and leaves its mark on Stoneybrook, including tearing down a beloved old tree.
114. Karen's Chicken Pox: Karen catches chickenpox from her adopted little sister Emily Michelle before Halloween. Will she miss out on all the fun?
115. Karen's Runaway Turkey: When Karen's class wins a real live turkey, they plan to make him a star of the school's Thanksgiving assembly. But when the turkey runs away from Karen's house, she's off on a wild turkey chase! Ghostwriter: Stephanie Calmenson.
116. Karen's Reindeer: When Karen spots a reindeer in the neighborhood, she makes up a special plan to reunite him with Santa. Karen waits for a sign from Santa at the school assembly, where she is playing Rudolph.
117. Karen's Mistake: Karen is having the time of her life at her family's New Year's Eve party, until she sees a gentleman kiss her grandmother on the cheek! Everyone else is happy that Nannie has a love interest, but Karen thinks it spells disaster.
118. Karen's Figure Eight: Karen is the most talented student in her ice-skating class. Her new friend, Jillian, the best skater in Stoneybrook, thinks Karen could grow up to be a champ. But it will take hard work, and Karen is sick of practicing! Does she want to grow up and be like Jillian, the skating star? Ghostwriter: Stephanie Calmenson.
119. Karen's Yo-Yo: Karen can do lots of great tricks with her new yo-yo. But when she takes it to school to show her friends, her substitute teacher is mad and takes it away. Later, Karen learns that someone has taken it from the teacher's desk and she must find out who did it.
120. Karen's Easter Parade: Diane is coming to visit. But Diana has changed since Karen last saw her. Now she's into breaking rules and pushing limits. She seems to think that the local Easter parade is a contest, and she'll do anything to make her hat the best in town!
121. Karen's Gift: Karen wants to give Mommy a special present. She will buy it with the money she makes walking dogs. But then Karen decides to get something else. Since she needs more money, she will walk more dogs. Soon Karen has too many dogs on her hands! But if she quits her job, she might have to break some big promises. What will she do? Ghostwriter: Stephanie Calmenson.
122. Karen's Cowboy: Karen's family is staying at a dude ranch run by a real cowboy. Going on trail rides is so much fun. But then Karen discovers that her cowboy friend has a big problem with his ranch. Can Karen help him before it's time to go home?

== Super Specials ==
1. Karen's Wish: Karen can't wait for Christmas. She and Andrew are writing to Santa, baking cookies, and decorating their tree. Karen is even learning about other holidays, like Hanukkah. Then Karen's grandmother gets sick and has to go to the hospital, and now Karen doesn't want Christmas to come at all.
2. Karen's Plane Trip: Karen is on her first plane trip, but this isn't just any plane trip. Karen is flying alone and she's going to visit her grandparents' farm in Nebraska for the first time.
3. Karen's Mystery: When Karen's dad loses his glasses, Karen and David Michael decide to play detectives and spend the rest of the day solving mysteries. Then Karen decides to start her own detective agency. Soon Karen discovers her pet rat Emily Junior is missing. Can Karen's detective agency find her?
4. Karen, Hannie, and Nancy: The Three Musketeers: With the whole summer ahead of them, Karen and her best friends, Hannie and Nancy, are excited about spending every moment together. But then Hannie and Nancy make plans without Karen, and Karen feels angry. What happened to the Three Musketeers?
5. Karen's Baby: When Karen learns that Nancy's mom is going to have a baby, she wants her mom to have one too, but her mom doesn't agree. Nancy says they can share her new baby brother and now Karen is excited too.
6. Karen's Campout: Karen, Hannie, and Nancy cannot wait for summer vacation. They are going to sleep-away camp for a whole week! But Karen has already been to Camp Mohawk before. And now she thinks she knows everything there is to know about camping. Until Karen's cabin spends a night sleeping in the woods. And Karen discovers that she might not know everything about camping after all! Ghostwriter: Stephanie Calmenson.

== Graphic novels ==
1. Karen's Witch: A Graphic Novel by Katy Farina (2019)
2. Karen's Roller Skates: A Graphic Novel by Katy Farina (2020)
3. Karen's Worst Day: A Graphic Novel by Katy Farina (2020)
4. Karen's Kittycat Club: A Graphic Novel by Katy Farina (2021)
5. Karen's School Picture: A Graphic Novel by Katy Farina (2022)
6. Karen's Birthday: A Graphic Novel by Katy Farina (2023)
7. Karen's Haircut: A Graphic Novel by Katy Farina (2023)
8. Karen's Sleepover: A Graphic Novel by Katy Farina (2024)
9. Karen's Grandmothers: A Graphic Novel by DK Yingst (2024)
10. Karen's Prize: A Graphic Novel by Shauna J. Grant (2025)
11. Karen's Ghost: A Graphic Novel by DK Yingst (2025)
12. Karen's Surprise: A Graphic Novel by Shauna J. Grant (2026)
13. Karen's New Year: A Graphic Novel by DK Yingst (2026)
14. Karen's in Love: A Graphic Novel by Lily Williams (2026)
15. Karen's Goldfish: A Graphic Novel by DK Yingst (2027)
16. Karen's Brothers: A Graphic Novel by Lily Williams (2028)
