= The Baby-Sitters Club (film) =

1995 film by Melanie Mayron

- Theatrical release poster
- Directed by: Melanie Mayron
- Written by: Dalene Young
- Based on: The Baby-Sitters Club by Ann M. Martin
- Produced by: Peter O. Almond; Jane Startz; Marc Abraham; Thomas Bliss
- Starring: Schuyler Fisk; Bre Blair; Tricia Joe; Rachael Leigh Cook; Larisa Oleynik; Stacy Linn Ramsower; Zelda Harris
- Cinematography: Willy Kurant
- Edited by: Christopher Greenbury
- Music by: David Michael Frank
- Production companies: Columbia Pictures; Beacon Pictures; Scholastic Productions
- Distributed by: Sony Pictures Releasing
- Release date: August 18, 1995
- Running time: 94 minutes
- Country: United States
- Language: English
- Budget: $6.5 million
- Box office: $9.6 million (USA)

The Baby-Sitters Club (advertised as The Baby-Sitters Club: The Movie) is a 1995 American comedy-drama film directed by Melanie Mayron (in her feature film directorial debut) and written by Dalene Young. Based on Ann M. Martin's novel series of the same name, the film stars Schuyler Fisk, Bre Blair in her film debut, Tricia Joe in her final film, Rachael Leigh Cook in her film debut, Larisa Oleynik in her debut film appearance, Stacy Linn Ramsower and Zelda Harris. The film is about one summer in the girls' lives in the fictional town of Stoneybrook, Connecticut. The film was shot in the California cities of Los Angeles, Altadena, and Santa Clarita.

The film was released on August 18, 1995 by Sony Pictures Releasing. The film received mostly mixed to positive reviews, and grossed $9.6 million against a budget of $6.5 million.

== Plot ==
At the first meeting of the summer, Kristy Thomas, the president and founder of a babysitting club called "The Babysitter's Club", has the great idea of holding a day camp for their babysitting charges for the entire summer. She and her co-founders (Claudia Kishi, Mary Anne Spier, Stacey McGill, Dawn Schafer, Mallory Pike, and Jessi Ramsey) vow to keep an eye on the children. Mary Anne and Dawn, who are stepsisters, offer their parents' backyard to serve as the campsite, as long as the kids do not come inside the house and the barn (leading the club to rent a porta potty for the summer). The summer camp annoys Mary Anne and Dawn's neighbor, Mrs. Haberman, who becomes increasingly upset because of the camp activities that are taking place next door, and keeps threatening to have the camp shut down.

Kristy's father Patrick also comes back into town to see her but cautions her to not tell anyone he is there. This leads to a summer of lies and secrets (only Mary Anne knows he is in town), while Kristy and her father re-build their bond over baseball and mouse-shaped pancakes. Kristy's 13th birthday comes, and her father promises to take Kristy to the local amusement park Fun Land for her birthday but never shows. Then a thunderstorm comes and Fun Land closes. Kristy tries to walk home in the rain, but is picked up by the members of the club when Mary Anne tells the other girls about what has been happening with Patrick. Kristy then finally celebrates her 13th birthday with her friends over a melted ice cream cake that the club members had made for her.

Claudia is forced to attend summer school because she failed science. Her parents have told her that she needs to bring up her grades and pass summer school or else they will force her to quit the Babysitters Club and repeat the 8th grade. Claudia is worried about not passing final exam until the kids, club members, and Alan Gray perform a rap song based on the material at the day camp, helping Claudia pass the test.

Mary Anne has a boyfriend named Logan Bruno, who is also a club member. But classmate Cokie Mason likes him too and wants to steal him from Mary Anne. Their rivalry lasts all summer and only ends when Jackie Rodowsky hits his first home run into Cokie, who is sitting in a tree nearby.

Stacey has a crush on a 17-year-old boy named Luca from Switzerland, who is Rosie Wilder's cousin. As their relationship progresses, she faces problems telling him about her diabetes, and later, her age. This is revealed after a trip to a New York City club with Claudia, in which a bouncer does not allow her into a club because she is underage. Luca is outraged that Stacey kept him in the dark regarding her age. Luca and Stacey break up briefly until Stacey calls on Luca to help them rescue Kristy during her rainy walk home from Fun Land. As Stacey is saying goodbye to Luca, he tells her that he will be coming to Stoneybrook again next year. Delighted, Stacey tells him that she will be 14 years old when he returns. They share a kiss just before Luca departs.

Alan Gray has a crush on Dawn Schafer, and tries to impress her by going to the day camp. When he helps the kids perform the rap song for Claudia, Dawn finally realizes that she likes Alan after all.

Mallory and Jessi have problems with the day camp thanks to the kids, who always misbehave and drive them crazy.

The club is also on the hunt for a new headquarters, believing they are close to outgrowing the space at Claudia's house. They find an old greenhouse and spend the summer with the kids cleaning and fixing it up. After the renovations and cleanup are complete, the members realize that Claudia's room is already perfect as club headquarters and they decide to give the greenhouse to Mrs. Haberman as a way of thanking her for putting up with the day camp. Mrs. Haberman takes a photo of the BSC and the children, and they are remembered forever.

== Cast ==
- Schuyler Fisk as Kristy Thomas
- Bre Blair as Stacey McGill
- Rachael Leigh Cook as Mary Anne Spier
- Zelda Harris as Jessi Ramsey
- Tricia Joe as Claudia Kishi
- Larisa Oleynik as Dawn Schafer
- Stacey Linn Ramsower as Mallory Pike
- Ellen Burstyn as Mrs. Haberman
- Brooke Adams as Elizabeth Thomas-Brewer
- Austin O'Brien as Logan Bruno
- Colleen Camp as Maureen McGill
- Peter Horton as Patrick Thomas
- Vanessa Zima as Rosie Wilder
- Christian Oliver as Luca
- Bruce Davison as Watson Brewer
- Jess Needham as Karen Brewer
- Asher Metchik as Jackie Rodowsky
- Marla Sokoloff as Cokie Mason
- Natanya Ross as Grace Blume
- Ashlee Turner as Bebe Hanson
- Aaron Michael Metchik as Alan Gray
- Kyla Pratt as Becca Ramsey
- Scarlett Pomers as Suzi Barrett

== Reception ==
=== Box office ===
The Baby-Sitters Club was one of two nationwide theatrical releases on the weekend of August 18, 1995. It suffered a disappointing debut, opening in ninth place with $3 million, which placed it behind Mortal Kombat. The total domestic gross was $9.6 million.

=== Critical response ===
On the review aggregator website Rotten Tomatoes, 67% of 15 critics' reviews are positive, with an average rating of 6.2/10. Metacritic, which uses a weighted average, assigned the film a score of 48 out of 100, based on 18 critics, indicating "mixed or average" reviews. Audiences surveyed by CinemaScore gave the film a grade "B+" on scale of A to F.

Kevin Thomas of the Los Angeles Times gave the film 4.5 out of 5 calling it "A beautiful film that possesses the power to enchant all ages." Hal Hinson of The Washington Post called the film "A colorful, buoyant, loving tribute to the notion of girlfriends forever." Edward Guthmann of the San Francisco Chronicle gave the film 2 out of 4 and was critical of the film saying "85 minutes doesn't provide an adequate format for developing seven distinct characters."

== Soundtrack ==
The Baby-Sitters Club: Music from the Motion Picture

Soundtrack album by Various Artists
- Released: August 8, 1995
- Genres: Pop rock Alternative rock
- Length: 32:49
- Label: Sony Wonder • Columbia
- Producers: Caulfields, Caulfields, Mike Denneen, Jermaine Dupri, David Michael Frank, Richard Gottehrer, Jeffrey Lesser, Paul McKercher, James McVay, Kevin Moloney, Brendan O'Brien, G. Marq Roswell, David Russo, Manuel Seal, Jr., Todd Smallwood, Brad Wood

Professional ratings
Review scores
Source	Rating
AllMusic	2.5/5 stars

The Baby-Sitters Club: Music from the Motion Picture is a soundtrack that was released on August 8, 1995. The trailer memorably included such hit 90s songs as "Cornflake Girl" by Tori Amos, "Good" by Better Than Ezra, and "Dreams" by The Cranberries, none of which are included on the soundtrack.

No.	Title	Performer(s)	Length
1.	"Summertime"	Moonpools & Caterpillars	2:50
2.	"Say It"	Clouds	2:11
3.	"Hannah, I Locked You Out"	The Caulfields	3:13
4.	"Let Me Know"	Xscape	3:42
5.	"Hold On"	Sun-60	4:40
6.	"Everything Changes"	Matthew Sweet	3:50
7.	"Don't Leave"	Ben Lee	1:59
8.	"Step Back"	Letters To Cleo	2:34
9.	"Daddy's Girl"	Lisa Harlow Stark	3:54
10.	"Girl-Girlfriend"	BSC	3:56
Total length:			32:49
