= The Trip to Bountiful (play) =

American play written by Horton Foote

- Written by: Horton Foote
- Subject: Family
- Genre: Drama
- Setting: Houston and Bountiful, Texas

Premiere
- Date: 1953

The Trip to Bountiful is a play by American playwright Horton Foote. It was first performed on March 1, 1953, on NBC television before premiering on the Broadway stage in November 1953.

The play depicts an elderly woman, Carrie Watts, "who has to live with a daughter-in-law who hates her and a son who does not dare take her side." While residing with this unhappy family in a Houston apartment, Watts dreams of returning to the tiny town of Bountiful, Texas, where she was raised. She manages to escape the apartment and embarks by bus to her destination. She meets several people along the way. Her stay in Bountiful is brief, as she is whisked back to Houston by her son and daughter-in-law.

The play was adapted into a film of the same name, released in 1985.

== Production history ==
The play, starring Lillian Gish, was broadcast on live television on NBC's Philco Television Playhouse on March 1, 1953. It then premiered on Broadway at Henry Miller's Theatre on November 3, 1953 for a run of 39 performances. The Trip to Bountiful was later produced Off-Broadway by the Signature Theatre Company at the Peter Norton Space in 2005, and was revived on Broadway at the Stephen Sondheim Theatre (which stands where Henry Miller's Theatre stood) from April 23, 2013 to October 9, 2013.

Vincent J. Donehue directed the NBC version, the summer theatre preview versions, the 1953 Broadway version, and the subsequent U.S. tour. The 2005 Off-Broadway production was directed by Harris Yulin.

The 2013 Broadway revival was directed by Michael Wilson, with scenic design by Jeff Cowie, costumes by Van Broughton Ramsey, lighting by Rui Rita, and original music and sound design by John Gromada. This production also marked Cicely Tyson's first Broadway appearance since 1983. She was joined by Cuba Gooding Jr., Condola Rashad and Vanessa Williams. The New York Times theater critic Ben Brantley deemed the use of an African-American cast to be a non-issue since the play's themes are blind to race.

Theatre	Opening Date	Closing Date	Perfs.	Details
Henry Miller's Theatre, Broadway	November 3, 1953	December 5, 1953	39	Broadway premiere
Peter Norton Space, New York	December 4, 2005	March 11, 2006	128	Off-Broadway revival
Stephen Sondheim Theatre, Broadway	April 23, 2013	October 9, 2013	187 (+27 previews)	Broadway revival

== Historical casting ==
Role	NBC Telecast 1953	Original Broadway 1953	Peter Norton revival 2005	Broadway revival 2013
Carrie Watts	Lillian Gish	Lillian Gish	Lois Smith	Cicely Tyson
Ludie Watts	John Beal	Gene Lyons	Devon Abner	Cuba Gooding Jr.
Thelma	Eva Marie Saint	Eva Marie Saint	Meghan Andrews	Condola Rashad
Jessie Mae Watts	Eileen Heckart	Jo Van Fleet	Hallie Foote	Vanessa Williams
Sheriff	Frank Overton	Frank Overton	James DeMarse	Tom Wopat
Houston Ticket Man	Will Hare	Will Hare	Gene Jones	Devon Abner
Second Houston Ticket Man	William Hansen	David Clive	Sam Kitchin	Curtis Billings
Harrison Ticket Man	Dennis Cross	Frederic Downs	Frank Girardeau	—
Roy	—	—	—	Arthur French
Attendant	Larry Bolton	—	—	—
Travelers	—	Helen Cordes; Neil Laurence; Salem Ludwig; Patricia MacDonald	—	—
Ensemble	—	—	—	Pat Bowie; Leon Addison Brown; Susan Heyward; Linda Powell; Charles Turner
Others	Frederic Downs; Gene Lyons; Jo Van Fleet	—	—	—

== Critical commentary ==
When the play debuted on Broadway in 1953, Brooks Atkinson wrote in The New York Times of Lillian Gish's performance in the role of Carrie Watts "As a weary old woman, homesick for her youth in the country, she gives an inspired performance that is alive in every detail and conveys unconquerable spirit." Of the production, Atkinson wrote "...the performance is so pitilessly exact that you can hardly tell where the writing leaves off and the acting begins." Atkinson describes Jo Van Fleet's role as Jessie Mae Watts, which earned the Tony Award for Best Featured Actress in a Play at the 8th Tony Awards as a "penetrating performance."

Lois Smith won the Drama Desk Award for Outstanding Actress in a Play, Outer Critics Circle Award Outstanding Actress in a Play, Obie Award Outstanding Performance and Lucille Lortel Award Outstanding Lead Actress, for her 2005 Off-Broadway leading performance as Carrie Watts. Smith was lauded in The New York Times by Ben Brantley with comments such as " I had never before realized how blue and bottomless her gaze is" and she "brings pure, revivifying oxygen to the role". Although a revival, Brantley noted "What this production provides that makes 'The Trip to Bountiful' seem newborn is its artful counterpoint of the smothering, claustrophobic details of daily life and Carrie's barrier-melting faith in her destiny."

In order to prepare for her role in the 2013 Broadway revival, Tyson visited playwright Horton Foote's home in rural Wharton, Texas. After viewing a matinee, Ben Brantley panned the production, calling it a "generally sluggish production" that "only fitfully captures the rhythms of everyday melancholy that you associate with Foote" and noted several other reservations such as, "This production allows too much dead air between lines...The show lacks the deceptively easy conversational flow" its director had previously demonstrated. He also notes that the show "often undercuts itself by broadening comic moments". Regarding Ms. Tyson's character singing hymns to herself during the production, Terry Teachout commented that during numerous performances, "a fair number of people in the theater sang along with her. It didn't look to me as though she was trying to encourage them, either: They just joined in..." and that a friend told him, "Three women sitting next to me started singing along, softly at first, and by the second hymn a good part of the audience was joyously singing with them. The theater was everyone's church that night, not just mine. To describe it sounds hokey, but it was anything but."

== Awards and nominations ==
=== Original 1953 Broadway production ===
Year	Award	Category	Nominee	Result
1954	Tony Award	Best Featured Actress in a Play	Jo Van Fleet	Won
1954	Outer Critics Circle Award	Special Award	Eva Marie Saint	Won
1954	Theatre World Award		Eva Marie Saint	Won

=== 2005 Off-Broadway revival ===
Year	Award	Category	Nominee	Result
2006	Drama Desk Award	Outstanding Revival of a Play		Nominated
2006	Drama Desk Award	Outstanding Actress in a Play	Lois Smith	Won
2006	Drama Desk Award	Outstanding Featured Actor in a Play	Devon Abner	Nominated
2006	Drama Desk Award	Outstanding Lighting Design	John McKernon	Nominated
2006	Drama Desk Award	Lifetime Achievement	Horton Foote	Won
2006	Outer Critics Circle Award	Outstanding Actress in a Play	Lois Smith	Won
2006	Outer Critics Circle Award	Outstanding Featured Actress in a Play	Hallie Foote	Nominated
2006	Outer Critics Circle Award	Outstanding Revival of a Play		Nominated
2006	Obie Award	Distinguished Performance by an Actress	Lois Smith	Won
2006	Lucille Lortel Award	Outstanding Revival		Won
2006	Lucille Lortel Award	Outstanding Director	Harris Yulin	Won
2006	Lucille Lortel Award	Outstanding Lead Actress	Lois Smith	Won
2006	Lucille Lortel Award	Outstanding Featured Actress	Hallie Foote	Won
2006	Lucille Lortel Award	Outstanding Featured Actress	Meghan Andrews	Nominated
2006	Lucille Lortel Award	Outstanding Costume Design	Martin Pakledinaz	Nominated
2006	Lucille Lortel Award	Outstanding Lighting Design	John McKernon	Nominated

=== 2013 Broadway revival ===
The Broadway production was recognized with Drama League Award nominations for Outstanding Revival of a Broadway or Off-Broadway Play and with Distinguished Performance Award nominations for both Cicely Tyson and Vanessa L. Williams. The production received four Outer Critics Circle Award nominations: Outstanding Revival of a Play (Broadway or Off-Broadway), Outstanding Director of a Play (Michael Wilson), Outstanding Actress in a Play (Cicely Tyson) and Outstanding Featured Actress in a Play (Vanessa L. Williams), with Tyson winning. The play earned three 58th Drama Desk Award nominations, with Tyson winning for Outstanding Actress in a Play. The play received four Tony Award nominations for the 67th Tony Awards, winning Best Actress in a Play. The show received an Artios Award nomination from The Casting Society of America for Outstanding Achievement in Casting, New York Broadway Theatre – Drama.

Year	Award	Category	Nominee	Result
2013	Drama League Award	Outstanding Revival of a Broadway or Off-Broadway Play		Nominated
2013	Drama League Award	Distinguished Performance Award	Cicely Tyson	Nominated
2013	Drama League Award	Distinguished Performance Award	Vanessa L. Williams	Nominated
2013	Outer Critics Circle Award	Outstanding Revival of a Play (Broadway or Off-Broadway)		Nominated
2013	Outer Critics Circle Award	Outstanding Director of a Play	Michael Wilson	Nominated
2013	Outer Critics Circle Award	Outstanding Actress in a Play	Cicely Tyson	Won
2013	Outer Critics Circle Award	Outstanding Featured Actress in a Play	Vanessa L. Williams	Nominated
2013	Drama Desk Award	Outstanding Revival of a Play		Nominated
2013	Drama Desk Award	Outstanding Actress in a Play	Cicely Tyson	Won
2013	Drama Desk Award	Outstanding Featured Actress in a Play	Vanessa L. Williams	Nominated
2013	Tony Award (67th)	Best Revival of a Play		Nominated
2013	Tony Award (67th)	Best Actress in a Play	Cicely Tyson	Won
2013	Tony Award (67th)	Best Featured Actress in a Play	Condola Rashad	Nominated
2013	Tony Award (67th)	Best Sound Design	John Gromada	Nominated
2013	Artios Award	Outstanding Achievement in Casting; New York Broadway Theatre – Drama	David Caparelliotis	Nominated

== Film adaptations ==
The Trip to Bountiful was adapted into a 1985 film starring Geraldine Page. Page won the Academy Award for Best Actress for her performance.

A made-for-television remake premiered on March 8, 2014 on the Lifetime network. The film featured Cicely Tyson in the lead role as Mrs. Carrie Watts, Vanessa Williams as Jessie Mae, Blair Underwood as Ludie, and Keke Palmer as Thelma. Tyson and Williams also appeared in the 2013 Broadway revival prior to this. Blair Underwood and Keke Palmer replaced Cuba Gooding, Jr. and Condola Rashad in the roles of Ludie Watts and Thelma from the Broadway cast. Tyson received a Primetime Emmy Award nomination for her performance.
