= My Name Is Brain Brian =

1993 novel by Jeanne Betancourt

My name is Brain/Brian
- Author: Jeanne Betancourt
- Language: English
- Genre: Realistic fiction
- Publisher: Scholastic
- Publication date: 1993
- Pages: 136

My Name is Brain Brian (stylized as My name is ~~Brain~~ Brian) is a children's novel written by the author of the Pony Pals series, Jeanne Betancourt. First published in 1993, it is a contemporary story which focuses on studying and dyslexia.

== Characters ==
=== Toomey family ===
Characters	Description
Brian Toomey	The main character, a dyslexic boy in sixth grade

=== Classmates ===
Characters	Description
Isabel Morris	Main character Nasty at first, later turned into good girl
"Jay" Jason Preston	Nerd; Isabel's friend
Caroline Betty	Quiet girl
Charlene	Isabel's rival
Beth	Isabel's rival
Mona	Isabel's rival
Ann	Ordinary classmate
Brad	Ordinary classmate
Sasha	Ordinary classmate
Karen Andrews	Ordinary classmate
Kevin Abbot	Ordinary classmate
Carlos	Reader; Ordinary classmate
Maria	Girl football player Reader; Ordinary classmate
Tony	Reader; Ordinary classmate
Zeth	Ordinary classmate

=== Bullies ===
Characters	Description
John Fedray	Member of the "Jokers Club"
Richie	Member of the "Jokers Club"
Mac	Supporting character Eight-grade biggest bully
Teddy	Mac's right-hand man Youngest bully
Steve	Bully
Josh	Newcomer bully

=== Doctors ===
Characters	Description
Dr. Ruth Jenny	Helps Brian overcome dyslexia
Dr. Penny Per	Ordinary clinic doctor
