= Bre Blair =

Canadian actress

- Born: Sarah Brianne Blair; 29 April 1980 (age 46); Canada
- Occupation: Actress
- Years active: 1992–present

Sarah Brianne Blair (born 29 April 1980) is a Canadian actress. She has played Stacey in the 1995 film The Baby-Sitters Club and Jessie West in the 2016 television drama series Game of Silence.

== Life and career ==
Her first major role was portraying Stacey McGill in the 1995 movie The Baby-Sitters Club.

Blair appeared in an episode of Love, Inc., as the character Claire. She has also appeared in the Psych episode "Shawn vs. the Red Phantom", on Nip/Tuck as Janet, and in The O.C. episode "The Shake Up" as Carrie Spitz. She also appeared in the comedy drama What About Brian as Lisa B. In 2008, she appeared in an episode of Grey's Anatomy titled "Brave New World".

From 2008 until 2009, she portrayed Joss Morgan Grey in the fourth season of The Unit. In 2013, she appeared in the movie Last Vegas, in which she plays the fiancée of Michael Douglas's character.

In 2016 she starred in the NBC drama Game of Silence.

From 2017 to 2025, she has had a recurring role as Annie Kay on the CBS Police Drama S.W.A.T. opposite Jay Harrington.

== Filmography ==
=== Film ===
| Year | Title | Role | Notes |
|---|---|---|---|
| 1995 | The Baby-Sitters Club | Stacey McGill | |
| 2000 | Cherry Falls | Stacy Twelfmann | |
| 2006 | Stripped Down | Wren | |
| 2008 | Em | Samantha | |
| 2008 | Ball Don't Lie | Angel | |
| 2008 | Something's Wrong in Kansas | Page | |
| 2010 | Small Town Saturday Night | Samantha Carson | |
| 2011 | Quarantine 2: Terminal | Paula | |
| 2013 | Last Vegas | Lisa | |
| 2015 | The Track | Julie | |
| 2016 | Toy | Alison | |
| 2018 | The Middle of X | Sam Clarke | |
| 2019 | A Thousand Miles Behind | Theo Avery | |
| 2020 | For the Love of Jessee | Jessica | |
| 2021 | Two Yellow Lines | Helen | |
| 2022 | Swamp Lion | Bee | Also co-producer |
| 2024 | The Red Bike | Bee | Short |
| 2025 | Gunslingers | Mary | |
| TBA | FEEL | Sitter 3 | Post-production |
| TBA | American Solitaire | Holly | Pre-production |

=== Television ===
| Year | Title | Role | Notes |
|---|---|---|---|
| 1992 | Intruders | Child Leigh Holland | Television miniseries |
| 2001 | Undressed | Elena | [unknown episodes] |
| 2003 | So Downtown | Patty | Unsold television pilot |
| 2003 | Judging Amy | Brittany Johnston | Episode: "Picture of Perfect" |
| 2004 | Humor Me | Taylor | Unsold television pilot |
| 2004 | The Tracy Morgan Show | Marcy | Episodes: "The Value of Money", "Career Day" |
| 2004 | Without a Trace | Molly | Episode: "The Season" |
| 2004 | Charmed | Brenda Castillo | Episode: "Charrrmed!" |
| 2005 | Life on a Stick | Jenny | Episode: "The Gods of Television" |
| 2005 | CSI: Crime Scene Investigation | Tracy | Episodes: "A Bullet Runs Through It: Parts 1 & 2" |
| 2006 | Monk | Debbie Barnett | Episode: "Mr. Monk Bumps His Head" |
| 2006 | Cold Case | Grace Anderson | Episode: "Superstar" |
| 2006 | What About Brian | Lisa B. | Recurring role |
| 2006 | Love, Inc. | Claire | Episode: "Friends" |
| 2006 | Psych | Talia | Episode: "Shawn vs. the Red Phantom" |
| 2006 | Nip/Tuck | Janet | Episode: "Conor McNamara, 2026" |
| 2006 | Twenty Questions | Laura Kessler-Jenks "K.J" | Unsold television pilot |
| 2007 | The O.C. | Carrie Spitz | Episode: "The Shake Up" |
| 2007 | Ghost Whisperer | Lynn | Episode: "The Cradle Will Rock" |
| 2007 | The Wedding Bells | Maureen | Episode: "Fools in Love" |
| 2007 | Criminal Minds | Maggie | Episode: "Legacy" |
| 2007–08 | My Boys | Debbie | Episodes: "Douchebag in the City", "Jack and Bobby" |
| 2007 | Carpoolers | Shayla | Episode: "Who Would You Do?" |
| 2007 | Cane | Juliet | Episode: "All Bets Are Off" |
| 2008 | October Road | Bethany | Episode: "Dancing Days Are Here Again" |
| 2008 | 'Til Death | Amanda | Episode: "Speed Bumps" |
| 2008 | Grey's Anatomy | Lauren Pailey | Episode: "Brave New World" |
| 2008 | The Starter Wife | Elle | Episode: "Mollywood" |
| 2008 | Gary Unmarried | Stephanie | Episode: "Gary Meets the Gang" |
| 2008–09 | The Unit | Joss Morgan | Recurring role |
| 2009 | Cop House | Meg | Unsold television pilot |
| 2009 | Drop Dead Diva | Angie | Episode: "Dead Model Walking" |
| 2009 | The Eastmans | Hailey Fyfe | Unsold television pilot |
| 2010 | Brothers & Sisters | Ms. Nadine | Episode: "Where There's Smoke..." |
| 2010 | Castle | Toni Johnston | Episode: "He's Dead, She's Dead" |
| 2011 | NCIS: Los Angeles | FBI Agent Carla Mitzer | Episode: "Archangel" |
| 2011 | The Hard Times of RJ Berger | Mrs. K | Episode: "Deadliest Crotch" |
| 2011 | Hawaii Five-0 | Chloe Ballantine | Episode: "Ua Hiki Mai Kapalena Pau" |
| 2011 | Franklin & Bash | Maya Paxton | Episode: "Bro-Bono" |
| 2011 | Happy Endings | Kim | Episode: "Why Can't You Read Me?" |
| 2011 | 90210 | Winter | 3 episodes |
| 2011 | Prime Suspect | Allison Martin | Episode: "Wednesday's Child" |
| 2012 | Make It or Break It | Mrs. McIntire | Recurring role |
| 2012 | Two and a Half Men | Rachel | Episode: "Four Balls, Two Bats and One Mitt" |
| 2013 | Thirtyish | Frannie Winters | Unsold television pilot |
| 2013 | We Are Men | Amy | Recurring role |
| 2013–14 | Legit | Jenny | Episodes: "Bag Lady", "Loveline" |
| 2014 | Benched | Maria | Episode: "Downsizing" |
| 2015 | The Flash | Tess Morgan | Episode: "Tricksters" |
| 2016 | Game of Silence | Jessie West | Main role |
| 2016 | The Night Shift | Dana | Episode: "Trust Issues" |
| 2017 | Flaked | Daisy | Episodes: "Day Four", "Day Five" |
| 2017 | Narcos | Lorraine | Episode: "The Kingpin Strategy" |
| 2017 | Shameless | Cynthia | Episode: "Fuck Paying It Forward" |
| 2017–2025 | S.W.A.T. | Annie Kay | Recurring role |
| 2018 | Lethal Weapon | Ali Weiss | Episode: "An Inconvenient Ruth" |
| 2018 | Life Sentence | Lauren | Episodes: "Clinical Trial and Error", "How Stella Got Her Groove On", "West Side Story" |
| 2019 | Magnum P.I. | Lina | Episode: "Knight Lasts Forever" |
| 2019 | Station 19 | Jennifer Ripley | Episodes: "Always Ready", "For Whom the Bell Tolls" |
| 2023 | Alert: Missing Persons Unit | June Butler | Episodes: "Hugo", "Andy" |
| 2023 | Heels | Karin | Episode: "Who the Hell Is The Condemned?" |
| 2026–present | Your Friends & Neighbors | Lisa Hughes | Recurring role |
