= California Diaries =

American series of teen novels

The California Diaries series is a spin-off of Ann M. Martin's The Baby-Sitters Club. All fifteen novels are written as first-person journals. The premise of the Diaries is that they are a school project; all students at their school must keep a journal, with the contents and method left up to them.

The main conflict of the series arises when the eighth grade is merged with the high school. The students abruptly go from being the oldest in middle school to the youngest in high school (now grades 8-12). This series covers more mature themes than The Baby-Sitters Club, such as alcohol, eating disorders, and cancer.

Books #2, #3, #4, #5, #6, #9, #10, and #14 were ghostwritten by Peter Lerangis, #7, #8, #13 were ghostwritten by Jeanne Betancourt, and #15 was ghostwritten by Nola Thacker. The interior illustrations in Amalia's diaries are by Stieg Retlin.

The first six books of the series have been translated into German, with Dawn's name changed to Julia, and Amalia to Anna.

== Main characters ==
Dawn Schafer, a member of The Baby-Sitters Club from Connecticut, returns to California to live with her father, stepmother, and brother. Upon her arrival, she reunites with old friends, and they try to revive the West Coast version of the Baby-Sitters Club; the We Love Kids Club. She spends the majority of the series trying to keep the group together, and to balance her desire to live in two states at once. At several points in the series, she has major conflicts with her best friend Sunny Winslow, usually regarding how infrequently Sunny visits her mother in the hospital. She gains a little sister named Elizabeth Grace ("Gracie") later in the series.

Sunny Winslow is Dawn's best friend in California. Her mother is suffering (and eventually dies) from lung cancer, and her father works all the time in his bookstore to avoid his pain, so he doesn't pay much attention to her. Sunny's rebellious behavior and negative attitude towards her friends are the main sources of conflict throughout the series, though Sunny's diaries reveal that she's acting out to get the attention she desires from her parents. She runs away from home in her first diary. In her third diary, her mother dies, leading Sunny to finally reconcile with her friends.

Maggie Blume is a girl whose father is obsessed with his job as a studio executive, but also puts pressure on her to have a detailed plan for high school and succeed academically. Maggie's true passion, however, is songwriting, which she hides fearing her father's disapproval; once her friends learn of her talent, however, she ends up becoming the lead singer for a band called Vanish. Maggie's early diaries also focus on her crush on another student, Justin Randall, whom she sees as unattainable. Her desire to regain control of her life causes her to develop anorexia. Throughout the series, her biggest struggle comes from trying to assert herself. Her mother's alcoholism eventually helps Maggie realize that she has a problem as well.

Amalia Vargas is Maggie's best friend. In her first diary, she is dating James, a junior at Vista. He becomes abusive and she breaks up with him with the support of her friends and sister. After this, she fears James, who has been stalking her since the breakup. He finally leaves her alone when she finds a new boyfriend, Brendan. Amalia is the manager of a band called Vanish. She was originally brought into the group by James, but the others realize that Amalia may have to quit if James remains. The other band members are Maggie, Patti, Bruce, Justin, and Rico. Amalia is fond of drawing in her diary. She lives with her parents and sister, Isabel.

Christopher "Ducky" McCrae is a 16-year-old high school sophomore whose real name is Christopher. He is friends with Dawn, Sunny, Maggie, and Amalia. His old friends, Jason (nicknamed "Jay") and Alex have previously drifted away. Jason is interested in girls, and Alex has depression and suicidal tendencies. His parents travel for months at a time, so he lives with his irresponsible older brother, Ted, whom his parents prefer. Ducky also works at Sunny's father's bookstore.

== Titles ==
1. Dawn
Friends. Changes. Together. Alone.

2. Sunny
Living. Dying. Run.

3. Maggie
Perfect. Always. Pressure.

4. Amalia
Love. Not.

5. Ducky
Guys. Girls. Nowhere.

6. Sunny, Diary Two
Waiting. Watching. Crash.

7. Dawn, Diary Two
Inside. Out.

8. Maggie, Diary Two
Weight. Problems.

9. Amalia, Diary Two
Fate.

10. Ducky, Diary Two
Try. Again.

11. Dawn, Diary Three
Missing. Losing. Hurt.

12. Sunny, Diary Three
Just. Cry.

13. Maggie, Diary Three
Life. Camera. Action.

14. Amalia, Diary Three
Confusion. Pain. Away.

15. Ducky, Diary Three
Together.
