= Ellen Miles =

American writer

- Born: April 8, 1957 (age 69); New York City, New York, US
- Occupation: Novelist
- Writing career
- Language: English
- Notable work: The Puppy Place Kitty Corner
- Website: ellenmiles.net

Ellen Miles (born April 8, 1957) is an American author, the writer of the Puppy Place and Kitty Corner series of children's books.

== Early life ==
She was born in New York City, on April 8, 1957, and now lives in Vermont.

== Career ==
Several of her stories have been translated into French and Spanish. She is also the author of the unauthorized Santa Paws series of books under the name Kris Edwards. She has also ghostwritten multiple Baby-Sitters Club books.
