= Baby-Sitters Little Sister =

Novel series

Baby-Sitters Little Sister is a series spin-off of The Baby-Sitters Club novel series, written by Ann M. Martin, and published by Scholastic between 1988 and 2000. The 122-book series centered on seven-year-old Karen Brewer, the stepsister to Kristy Thomas, who is the President of the Baby-Sitters Club. In this series, Karen is a second grader at Stoneybrook Academy. The stories are about the adventures that Karen and her friends have. Karen usually tries to do the right thing, but because she has been through some hard times in her young life, she sometimes makes a mistake. She does, however, learn from her mistakes.

In the beginning of the series, Karen and her younger brother, Andrew, live primarily with their mother, Lisa, and stepfather, Seth Engle. Karen and Andrew do not get to spend much time with their father, Watson Brewer, and stepmother, Elizabeth Thomas-Brewer. Therefore, they end up missing the extended family so much that they request to spend equal time with both families.

Although the series covered holiday celebrations every year in real-time, Karen only celebrated her birthday once (she turned seven years old in Baby-Sitters Little Sister #7, Karen's Birthday).

On April 30, 2019, it was announced that there were plans for a series of Baby-Sitters Little Sister graphic novels illustrated by Katy Farina and colored by Braden Lamb. The first graphic novel, Karen's Witch, was released on December 26, 2019. Three more graphic novels followed: Karen's Roller Skates was released on July 7, 2020, Karen's Worst Day was released on December 29, 2020, Karen's Kittycat Club was released on July 20, 2021, Karen’s School Picture was released on February 1, 2022, Karen's Birthday was released on January 3, 2023, Karen's Haircut was released on July 4, 2023, followed by Karen's Sleepover in May 7th, 2024.

== See also ==
- List of The Baby-sitters Little Sister novels
