= Meghan Andrews =

American actress and singer

- Occupations: Actress, singer
- Years active: 1990s–present

Meghan Andrews is an American actress and singer.

== Career ==
Andrews began her career as a child actor, appearing in the television series The Baby-Sitters Club, which aired on HBO. She also appeared in other television programming during the early 1990s.

She later established a stage career, appearing in Broadway, Off-Broadway, regional, and touring productions. Her theater credits include productions such as The Trip to Bountiful, King Charles III, King Lear, and The Spitfire Grill, which were reviewed in regional and national publications.

Andrews appeared in a production of Doubt: A Parable, which was reviewed by The New York Times. The review described her performance as Sister James as being “played with heartbreaking intensity.”

Andrews was nominated for a Lucille Lortel Award for her performance in The Trip to Bountiful. In 2022, she received a BroadwayWorld Award for her performance as Lady Macbeth at the Alabama Shakespeare Festival.

Andrews appeared in the Apple TV+ series Shrinking as Jennie.

In addition to acting, Andrews is a singer-songwriter who has released studio recordings and performed live.

== Filmography ==
Film and television
Year	Title	Role	Notes
1990	Earthday Birthday	(voice)	TV movie
1990-1993	The Baby-Sitters Club	Mallory Pike	13 Episodes
1991	Flesh 'n' Blood	Beauty Weed	12 episodes
1996	Law & Order	Brandson Daughter	Episode: "Corpus Deliciti"
1997	Cost of Living	Ted's Sister	
2004–2005	Guiding Light	Tara Ledom	TV series
2007	Law & Order: Criminal Intent	Vanessa Albert	Episode: "Lonelyville"
2011	The Adjustment Bureau	Cedar Lake Receptionist	
2011	Justified	Jill	Episode: "Save My Love"
2016	Drifting	Robbie	
2016	The Big Swim	Mary Simmons	Short
2024	Shrinking	Jennie	Episode: "Psychological Something-ism"

== Theatre ==
Year	Title	Role	Venue	Notes
1989	The Secret Garden	Mary	1st Broadway Workshop Production	Jujamcyn Productions
1990	Forgiving Typhoid Mary	Sarah	George Street Playhouse	
1990	The Grapes of Wrath	Ruthie Joad - Understudy	Cort Theatre - Broadway	Produced by Steppenwolf Theatre Company
1990	Tamara	Tamara	Ensemble Studio Theatre, NYC	Off-Off Broadway
1999	The Taming of the Shrew	Bianca	Franklin Stock Company	
2003	All's Well That Ends Well	Countess	Blessed Unrest, NYC	Off-Off Broadway
2004	Defences of Prague	Diana	La Mama Experimental Theatre Club	Off-Off Broadway
2004	Sympathy	Jean	Ensemble Studio Theatre, NYC	Off-Off Broadway
2005-2006	The Trip to Bountiful	Thelma	Signature Theatre Company, NYC	Off-Broadway Nomination for Best Supporting Actress, Lucille Lortel Awards
2006	Clocks & Whistles	Anne	Origin Theatre Company, NYC	Off-Off Broadway
2006	Honky Tonk Angels	Darlene	Alabama Shakespeare Festival	
2007	Dracula	Mina	Fulton Opera House	
2007	Doubt: A Parable	Sister James	George Street Playhouse	
2007	Frost/Nixon	Evonne, Caroline understudy	St. James Theatre - Broadway	Produced by The Donmar Warehouse
2008	The Trip to Bountiful	Thelma	The Goodman Theatre |Chicago	
2008-2009	Frost/Nixon	Evonne	Broadway Tour	1st National Tour
2012	Words By... Ira Gershwin	Chanteuse	North Coast Repertory Theatre	San Diego, California
2013	Educating Rita	Rita	North Coast Repertory Theatre	San Diego, California
2013	Miracle on South Division Street	Beverly	Colony Theatre - Burbank	ArtsInLA.com Best Actress Critics Pick
2014	Collected Stories	Lisa	Rubicon Theatre	Ventura, CA
2015	The Empty Man	Kate	The Blank Theatre Company	Los Angeles
2016	Much Ado About Nothing	Hero	Here & Now Theatre Company	West Townshend, Vermont
2017	A Midsummer Night's Dream	Helena	Here & Now Theatre Company	West Townshend, Vermont
2017	The Spitfire Grill	Shelby	North Coast Reperatory Theatre	San Diego, CA
2017	King Charles III	Kate Middleton	Pasadena Playhouse	Los Angeles
2018	Theory Of Nothing	Sugar	Pasadena Playhouse	Los Angeles
2018	King Lear	Regan	Rubicon Theatre	Ventura, CA
2019	Ladies	Elizabeth Montagu	Boston Court Pasadena Theatre Company	Los Angeles
2020	Passion	Fosca	Boston Court Pasadena Theatre Company	Los Angeles
2022	Macbeth	Lady Macbeth	Alabama Shakespeare Festival	
2023	Into the Breeches	Maggie	I.C.T	Long Beach
2023	The Sound of Music	Elsa	Musical Theatre West	2023-2024 Scenies Winner! Outstanding Featured Performance in a Musical Stage Scene LA

== Awards and nominations ==
- Lucille Lortel Award for Outstanding Featured Actress (2006, nominated, The Trip to Bountiful)
- Best Featured Performance in a Musical at the Stage Scene LA Awards "Scenies" (2023, win for The Sound of Music)
