= Jessica Prunell =

American lawyer and former child actress

- Born: 1977 or 1978 (age 48–49)
- Height: 5 ft 7 in (170 cm)

Jessica Prunell (born 1977 or 1978) is an American lawyer and former child actress.

Prunell is the daughter of Tito and Kay Prunell.

Prunell began modeling and making commercials when she was 6 years old, eventually obtaining a contract with the Ford Model Agency. Photographs of her were used in print advertising and on toy boxes, and she expanded her work to include making commercials for AT&T and Life cereal, among other companies and products. Her first feature film was Born on the Fourth of July. On television, Prunell portrayed Winifred Tattinger on the NBC comedy Tattingers (1989).

Since her graduation from law school, she has been practicing general commercial litigation. She has been an associate of the Fischer & Mandell law firm in New York City. She currently is an attorney with Hogan, Lovells LLP in New York City.

== Filmography ==
Film and television
Year	Title	Role	Notes
1989	Born on the Fourth of July	Young Donna	
1989	Tattingers	Winnifred Tattinger	Episodes: "Half a Loaf", "El Sid", "Tour of Doody"
1990	The Baby-Sitters Club	Stacey McGill	Main role
1997-1998	One Saturday Morning	Charlie	TV series
2000	Followers	Cynthia Gordon	
