= Jeanne Betancourt =

American writer

- Born: October 2, 1941 (age 85); Vermont, United States
- Education: College of St. Joseph (BS); New York University (MA)
- Occupations: Author, screenwriter
- Children: Nicole (daughter)
- Writing career
- Notable work: Pony Pals
- Website: jeannebetancourt.com

Jeanne Betancourt (born October 2, 1941, in Vermont) is an American author and television script writer best known for her Pony Pals series of books.

== Biography ==
Betancourt was born and raised in rural Vermont. She lived across from a dairy farm; this rural setting would later influence many of her works. During her childhood, she never considered being an author. Instead, she wanted to dance, and studied tap dance. When she grew too tall (at five feet, eight inches) to be a Rockette, she decided to become a religious sister in her junior year of high school. After graduating high school, she moved to Rutland, Vermont, where she entered the Sisters of St. Joseph, a teaching order of sisters.

She earned a Bachelor of Science in 1964 from the College of St. Joseph the Provider and a Master of Arts degree in film from New York University in 1974. Women in Focus, her first published work, focuses on her master's degree project.

Betancourt left the Sisters of Saint Joseph and moved to New York City, where she taught public high school. She married and had a daughter, Nicole. She wrote her first children's book, SMILE! How to cope with braces, in 1982 when her daughter Nicole had braces, and soon became a full-time author. She later divorced.

She currently lives either on the top floor of a sixteen-story building near the American Museum of Natural History in New York City or in her home in Connecticut. In her free time she draws, oil paints, gardens, and reads.

== Awards ==
In television, Betancourt has garnered the National Psychological Award for Excellence in the Media, two Humanitas Awards, and six Emmy Award nominations.

Betancourt has also won numerous awards for her novels, including a Children's Choice Award from the International Reading Association and the Children's Book Council for Sweet Sixteen and Never... and a Lifetime Achievement Award.

== Select bibliography ==
Note: all retrieved from (a complete bibliography)

- Pony Pals series
- My Name is Brain Brian
- Puppy Love
- Home Sweet Home
- The Edge
- Dear Diary
- Cheer USA series
- Ava Tree and the Wishes Three
