= Kyndra Sanchez =

American actress

- Born: August 24, 2006 (age 19); New York City, New York
- Occupation: Actress
- Years active: 2016–present

Kyndra Sanchez is an American actress. She is best known for playing Dawn Schafer in the comedy drama series The Baby-Sitters Club.

== Early life ==
Sanchez was born in The Bronx to Puerto Rican parents. She moved to Long Island at the age of 5. At the age of 8 while shopping with her mother she saw a poster of a Latina woman that looked like her but older. After asking her mother how she could be like her she registered her in a local acting program. She attended a regular public school in her local Long Island area.

== Career ==
Sanchez made her acting debut at 8 years old in a Verizon commercial. Early on in her career she made appearances in Sesame Street, Dora and Friends: Into the City and Butterbean's Café Her first big role came voicing Bonnie Bones in the animated series Santiago of the Seas. Her biggest role so far has been playing Dawn Schafer in the comedy drama series The Baby-Sitters Club. She took over the role from Xochitl Gomez.

== Personal life ==
In her spare time, she volunteers. She has held lemonade stands for the Pediatric Cancer Research Foundation and visits senior centers every Christmas to sing carols and play the guitar.

== Filmography ==
=== Film ===
Year	Title	Role	Notes
2021	Finding ʻOhana	Yoli Greenberg	
2022	Marry Me	Student	
2022	Christmas with You	Gloria	
2023	Theater Camp	Darla Sanchez	

=== Television ===
Year	Title	Role	Notes
2016	Dora and Friends: Into the City!	June	Episode; Alana's Food Truck
2018-2020	Butterbean's Café	Brookie	6 episodes
2019	Sesame Street	Girl	Episode; Play Time
2020	The Queen's Gambit	Orphanage Girl	Episode; Fork
2021	The Baby-Sitters Club	Dawn Schafer	8 episodes
2022	Blue Bloods	Soli Ruiz	Episode; Silver Linings
2020-2023	Santiago of the Seas	Bonnie Bones	24 episodes
