= The Baby-Sitters Club (2020 TV series) =

2020 American comedy-drama series

- Genre: Comedy drama
- Created by: Rachel Shukert
- Based on: The Baby-Sitters Club by Ann M. Martin
- Starring: Sophie Grace; Momona Tamada; Shay Rudolph; Malia Baker; Alicia Silverstone; Mark Feuerstein; Xochitl Gomez; Vivian Watson; Kyndra Sanchez; Anais Lee
- Music by: Jesse Novak
- Country of origin: United States
- Original language: English
- No. of seasons: 2
- No. of episodes: 18

Production
- Executive producers: Rachel Shukert; Lucia Aniello; Michael De Luca; Lucy Kitada; Frank Smith; Naia Cucukov; Benjamin Forrer; Sascha Rothchild; Deborah Forte
- Producers: Meg Schave; Ann M. Martin; Lyle Friedman; Ashley Glazier; Matthew Chipera
- Cinematography: Adam Silver; Christopher Charles Kempinski
- Editors: Joseph Ettinger; Jamie Gross; Janet Weinberg
- Running time: 22–27 minutes
- Production companies: Terrible Baby Productions; Paulilu; Michael De Luca Productions; Walden Media

Original release
- Network: Netflix
- Release: July 3, 2020 – October 11, 2021

The Baby-Sitters Club is an American comedy-drama television series created by Rachel Shukert, based on the children's novel series of the same name by Ann M. Martin. It was released on Netflix on July 3, 2020. In October 2020, the series was renewed for a second season which was released on October 11, 2021. In March 2022, the series was canceled after two seasons. The series was praised for its faithfulness to its source material and appeal for modern audiences.

== Plot ==
The series follows the friendship and adventures of five middle-schoolers as they start a babysitting business in Stoneybrook, Connecticut.

== Cast and characters ==
=== Main ===
- Sophie Grace as Kristy Thomas, the president of the club, she is a vocal individual, frequently sharing her opinion about feminism as well as other social troubles
- Momona Tamada as Claudia Kishi, the popular vice president of the club who has a passion for any type of art, but she frequently struggles in her studies. She hides candy around her room, which is the meeting place for the club. She is Japanese American, but never learned to speak Japanese.
- Shay Rudolph as Stacey McGill, the treasurer of the club who is from Upper West Side of Manhattan. She does very well in math. She is type one diabetic.
- Malia Baker as Mary Anne Spier, the shy secretary of the club and Kristy's best friend. She is portrayed as biracial in the 2020 series. She is known in season 1 as the "baby" of the club. She lost her mother when she was 18 months old and has a very overprotective father.
- Alicia Silverstone as Elizabeth Thomas-Brewer, (Note: Alicia Silverstone is credited as "Special Guest Star" but is a Series Regular.) Kristy's divorced mother
- Mark Feuerstein as Watson Brewer, (Note: Mark Feuerstein is credited as "Special Guest Star" but is a Series Regular.) Elizabeth's wealthy fiancé and later husband. Kristy dislikes him at first, but later in the show, she grows accustomed to him.
- Xochitl Gomez (season 1) and Kyndra Sanchez (season 2) as Dawn Schafer, Mary Anne's new friend who recently moved to Stoneybrook from Los Angeles and the alternate officer of the club. She is Hispanic-American and her mother used to go to school with Mary Anne's father, Richard Spier.
- Vivian Watson as Mallory Pike (recurring season 1, starring season 2), Jessi's best friend who loves horses, has seven siblings and is the junior officer of the club.
- Anais Lee as Jessi Ramsey (guest season 1, starring season 2), Mallory's best friend who is a very talented ballet dancer and is the other junior officer of the club.

=== Recurring ===
- Takayo Fischer as Mimi Yamamoto, Claudia's grandmother. Claudia and Mimi have a special relationship.
- Aya Furukawa as Janine Kishi, the smart but distant older sister of Claudia who does have a soft side In season 2, she comes out as lesbian.
- Marc Evan Jackson as Richard Spier, Mary Anne's overprotective father who rekindles his high school relationship with Sharon Porter
- Benjamin Goas as David Michael Thomas, Kristy's youngest brother
- Dylan Kingwell as Sam Thomas, Kristy's older brother and Stacey's crush
- Ethan Farrell as Charles Thomas, Kristy's oldest brother
- Sebastian Billingsley-Rodriguez as Andrew Brewer, Watson's son
- Sophia Reid-Gantzert as Karen Brewer, Watson's imaginative, 'strange' daughter
- Rian McCririck as Logan Bruno, Mary Anne's love interest
- Jessica Elaina Eason as Sharon Porter, Dawn's free-spirited mother who develops a relationship with Richard Spier
- Kelcey Mawema as Ashley Wyeth, Janine Kishi's girlfriend whom Claudia admires

== Episodes ==
=== Series overview ===
Season	Episodes	Originally released
1	10	July 3, 2020
2	8	October 11, 2021

=== Season 1 (2020) ===
No. overall	No. in season	Title	Directed by	Written by	Original release date
1	1	"Kristy's Great Idea"	Lucia Aniello	Rachel Shukert	July 3, 2020
Kristy realizes the potential profit in babysitting agencies when her mother Elizabeth is unable to find a sitter, so she decides to form a club including herself, best friend Mary Anne, Claudia and Stacey. Elizabeth announces that she will marry her long-term boyfriend Watson, which causes Kristy to express her unhappiness. When Watson calls the Baby-Sitters Club asking them to look after his children, Mary Anne agrees to do it since Kristy refuses. Stacey says that she cannot do it since she will be in New York with her parents for a last-minute trip. Kristy however, later sees her in town and realizes that Stacey has lied, but keeps it to herself. Watson recommends the club to his friends and they receive a surge of babysitting jobs.
2	2	"Claudia and the Phantom Phone Calls"	Lucia Aniello	Rachel Shukert	July 3, 2020
Claudia gets asked to a school dance by classmate and crush, Trevor. Claudia's parents learn that she is failing in algebra, and her older sister Janine informs them of the dance she wishes to attend. She suggests that Claudia only be allowed to attend if she passes her upcoming algebra exam. When she fails, Stacey suggests she take her passed test and claim that it's hers. Claudia initially goes along with the idea in order to see Trevor at the dance, but she later tells her parents the truth and is not allowed to go. Mary Anne's father is angry when she returns home from babysitting twenty minutes late, and he swaps her smartphone for an older model. Kristy expresses disapproval of his overprotective treatment to Mary Anne, who makes a jab about Kristy's absent father. While at the dance, Stacey learns of a rival agency of older girls that are stealing the club's clients.
3	3	"The Truth About Stacey"	Andrew DeYoung	Joanna Calo	July 3, 2020
The Baby-Sitters Club encounters a rival group, The Baby-Sitters Agency, made up of older teenagers who have no curfews and can drive themselves. Due to these advantages, the BSC slowly begins to lose clients to the Agency. Meanwhile, Stacey is revealed to have type 1 diabetes and has an insulin pump. Due to insecurity, she keeps it a secret from the girls. Soon, the Agency shows their immaturity when Stacey catches one of their assigned kids playing in the street, as his uninterested sitter is with her boyfriend. Stacey, recognizing the danger of such carelessness, calls the child's mother to report the incident. The Baby-Sitters Agency retaliates by sending a video of Stacey (while she was living in New York) having a diabetic seizure, to the BSC's clients. Stacey is forced to admit her condition to the girls, who are sympathetic. They contact all their clients for a sit-down meeting and Stacey explains her situation to them. After being assured that Stacey has her condition properly managed, the parents decide that they prefer the mature and educational technique of the Baby-Sitters Club compared to the laziness of the Baby-Sitters Agency. Thus, their club business is revived once again.
4	4	"Mary Anne Saves the Day"	Lucia Aniello	Lyle Friedman	July 3, 2020
The club gets a call from a client who asks Mary Anne to babysit their child, Bailey. A timid Mary Anne agrees to the job, despite the rule that requests for specific sitters is against club guidelines. Her passive nature makes the club members frustrated with her. Returning home, Mary Anne vents to her father about how the girls supposedly think badly of her. The next day, Mary Anne learns her father called the other girls' parents for allegedly bullying her, and they're all grounded. Shunned by the other BSC members, Mary Anne sits alone at lunch and is approached by new girl Dawn, where they bond. Meanwhile, while babysitting Bailey, Mary Anne learns Bailey is transgender. On a social outing with Dawn and her mother, Mary Anne becomes overwhelmed and runs away and Dawn comforts her. During a second babysitting gig, Bailey becomes sick and Mary Anne takes her to the hospital. At the hospital, Bailey becomes upset when the medical staff misgender her. Mary Anne confronts them about their mistake. Mary Anne's father oversees, realizing her maturity. The club members hear the news, and they reconcile. Mary Anne invites Dawn and her mother for Thanksgiving, where it is revealed that Dawn's mother and Mary Anne's father were high school sweethearts.
5	5	"Dawn and the Impossible Three"	Heather Jack	Rheeqrheeq Chainey	July 3, 2020
Mary Anne brings Dawn to a club meeting, where Kristy reluctantly agrees to make her a member if she can deal with the difficult Barrett family. Richard invites Sharon for dinner, where he allows Mary Anne to make tweaks to her bedroom. However, he's angry to learn they are changing the room completely, since his late wife had originally decorated it. Dawn struggles with the Barrett family when Natalie, a newly divorced mom, begins to take advantage of her services. She asks Kristy for advice, who tells her to be sterner. When one of the kids goes missing while on the job, a panicked Dawn calls Kristy, who runs over as the police are called. The girls learn that the boy's father had picked him up for his routine swimming lesson, and they realize Natalie forgot to inform them. An upset Kristy confides in Dawn that her father left and has not talked to her in over a year. After this, Dawn is made an official BSC member and her mother tells off Natalie for being irresponsible.
6	6	"Claudia and Mean Janine"	Linda Mendoza	Jade Chang	July 3, 2020
Claudia and Stacey redecorate Mary Anne's room. Mary Anne claims she likes it but secretly doesn't. She finally tells them the room does not feel right, and after some thinking, they decide to re-hang a caricature of Mary Anne's mother. While playing a game with Janine and Mimi, Claudia gets into an argument with Janine about her lack of compassion. Stressed from the argument, Mimi leaves the room and suffers a mild stroke. She is taken to the hospital, where she wakes up speaking about her experiences in Manzanar, a detention camp for Japanese-Americans during World War II. Claudia is upset that Janine can communicate with Mimi in Japanese, while she cannot; however, the experience brings the sisters closer. At an art fair, Claudia is told by an industry professional that her art should mean something to her, so she decides to draw Mimi as a young girl in Manzanar. The club receives a call requesting a week-long babysitting gig.
7	7	"Boy-Crazy Stacey"	Linda Mendoza	Dan Robert & Lisha Brooks	July 3, 2020
During spring break, Stacey and Mary Anne go out of town for a week-long babysitting job. While Stacey is babysitting on the beach, she forms a crush on an older lifeguard, leaving Mary Anne to handle the kids herself. Mary Anne warns her that he is too old for her, but she continues to chase after him. Stacey is upset to learn he has a girlfriend, but realizes that she was being delusional. She apologizes to Mary Anne and makes matching t-shirts for the pair of them as an apology. Watson asks Kristy to babysit his children while he is out of town with Elizabeth, to which she agrees. When his car gets damaged during a car wash-gone-wrong, she tries to pay for it to be repaired. Watson learns of the damage, but reassures Kristy that it is fine.
8	8	"Kristy's Big Day"	Kimmy Gatewood	Rachel Shukert	July 3, 2020
The club discuss their plans to attend summer camp together, with the exception of Claudia who will be attending art camp. Claudia later decides to postpone art camp so that she can be with the club over the summer. Kristy is shocked by the lavish lifestyle that Watson is exposing her family to, including buying her brother a new BMW (which her mom reluctantly permits), an expensive wedding and moving the family into a much larger house. Kristy tries on her dress for the wedding, but is uncomfortable with it. Watson reassures Kristy that it can be changed to suit her liking, buying her a new dress. Upon learning the original dress cost $800, Elizabeth accuses Kristy of being spoiled, to which Kristy claims she did not want her mother to get married at all. While at the afterparty, Kristy gets her first period and hides in the bathroom. All of the club members support her as she copes with her life's new changes. Elizabeth and Kristy apologize to each other and reconcile just before she leaves for her honeymoon.
9	9	"Hello, Camp Moosehead! Part 1"	Luke Matheny	Joanna Calo	July 3, 2020
Arriving at Camp Moosehead, the girls are disgruntled to learn they will not be in the same cabin together as requested. Mary Anne befriends Laine, who shares her interest in Broadway shows, and they decide to put on a production at the camp. Stacey later reveals that Laine is her former friend from New York who betrayed her when the online video of her was posted. Stacey is given the lead role in the production as Mary Anne runs into crush Logan, who is Stacey's co-star. Claudia and Dawn realize that some kids at the camp are unable to pay expensive prices to partake in fun art activities, so they run their own unauthorized art class. However, their efforts are cut short by the camp leaders, resulting in Claudia being taken to her cabin as punishment. Kristy is scolded when she repeatedly tries to take charge of the younger camp kids as a counselor, unable to relax when being refused to be taken seriously.
10	10	"Hello, Camp Moosehead! Part 2"	Luke Matheny	Lucia Aniello & Ariel Karlin	July 3, 2020
Stacey gets rashes from poison ivy, as well as Laine. While stuck in the medical room together, the pair reconcile their friendship. Mary Anne fills in for Stacey in the show and eventually, shares a kiss with Logan. Kristy notices that Karen has gone missing, soon finding her at a bus stop trying to go home. Karen confides in Kristy that she feels too weird to make friends, but Kristy reassures her camp will be fun. In order to get justice for kids who cannot afford expensive activities, Dawn and Claudia enlist campers to protest the unfair arrangements. This causes tension between Dawn and Mary Anne, due to the protest causing problems for her hard-worked play, but the girls make up. When the camp leader threatens to send them home, the BSC explains the unnoticed issues with the camp; such as no one but Kristy noticing Karen had gone missing. Finally being listened to, they are made Counselors-in-Training.

=== Season 2 (2021) ===
No. overall	No. in season	Title	Directed by	Written by	Original release date
11	1	"Kristy and the Snobs"	Robert Luketic	Rachel Shukert	October 11, 2021
Kristy tries to adapt to her new neighborhood after the Thomases moved in to Brewers' house following Liz and Watson's wedding. Kristy and Liz are invited to have tea with Amanda Delaney and her mother, and they feel offended by Mrs. Delaney's snobby comment about Liz's job and their wealth. Kristy babysits Amanda and lures her into her house to hang out with David Michael. After Amanda chats with David Michael and finds out the Thomases' family dog, Louie, was put down due to old age, the Delaneys invite the Thomas-Brewer family to an animal adoption event. David Michael adopts a puppy and names her Shannon, after Mrs. Delaney's first name. Meanwhile, Mary Anne has trouble connecting with Logan after their kiss at Camp Moosehead, after failed attempts at astrology and stalking Logan on social media, Kristy ultimately brings Mary Anne and Logan together by inviting Logan to a pool party at her new house.
12	2	"Claudia and the New Girl"	Robert Luketic	Sascha Rothchild	October 11, 2021
During a sleepover, the club takes a personality quiz to find out what role they are in the club, and Mallory is stunned when she learns that she does not fit into anything. Kristy gets sick after the sleepover and is forced to rest in bed. Claudia is excited to fill in as the club president but is surprised to see that Kristy has asked Dawn to be the president for the week. Dawn proposes a few changes to the club, including paying a percentage of their earnings as club fees and donate some of the treasury to charity every month, to which the club members have mixed feelings about. When Claudia is training Mallory, she berates her after Mallory talks to her about the stories she has written and fails to be helpful in any way. After a chat with Mimi and Janine's new friend, Ashley Wyeth, Claudia learns the art of listening and goes to Mallory's house to apologize, they decide to work together to adapt Mallory's stories into children's books. Mallory retakes the quiz and finds out that she is a storyteller. Kristy returns to club meetings and implements Dawn's suggestions for the club with some modifications.
13	3	"Stacey's Emergency"	Kimmy Gatewood	Ryan O'Connell	October 11, 2021
After transitioning to a wireless insulin pump, Stacey becomes more confident with herself and thinks that she has now conquered her diabetes because it is a number's game. Stacey's doctor nominates her to be the next spokesperson at a gala hosted by the JDRF (Juvenile Diabetes Research Foundation), where she will give a speech, put on a fashion show, and get featured on the cover of the magazine. However, Stacey is experiencing high and low blood sugar in the days leading to the gala and grows upset when Claudia and Jessi ask her if she is feeling well. Stacey breaks down during the speech and feels that she is a fraud for her inability to control her blood sugar levels, and her doctor reassures her that it is okay to have bad days when she is facing the challenges of diabetes every day. At the next club meeting, Stacey apologizes to the club and they put on a fashion show of their own. Meanwhile, after a conversation between Sharon and Liz, Dawn reveals to Kristy about Liz's plans to have another baby to bring the Thomas-Brewer family closer together. Kristy is upset that Liz is keeping it a secret, and she wins the silent auction of the baby baskets (with the help from Mallory and Dawn), which she gives to Liz as a surprise. After the gala, Liz tells Kristy that she didn't tell her about having a baby because of her fear of not fulfilling that promise, and Kristy reassures her mom that everything they have right now is already good enough.
14	4	"Jessi and the Superbrat"	Robert Luketic	Rheeqrheeq Chainey	October 11, 2021
Jessi is excited about the winter showcase in her ballet class but is disappointed when she only gets a minor part in the show, which has caused her to have doubts about her interest in ballet. Jessi babysits Derek Masters, a Tiktok superstar famous for his unboxing videos and his own brand "Superbrat", and comes up with an idea about making videos to gain more popularity. When she talks about her plans to make videos and quit ballet with her mother, her mother scolds her when Mary Anne is present. Derek feels bummed after not getting the main role of a TV show, and Jessi cheers him up by dancing and making ice cream together. When Derek's father, Chaz, finds out that Jessi and Derek did not make videos about the fun things they did, he calls Kristy and the two have a chat on setting the boundaries from the perspective of the babysitters. At the ballet performance, Jessi feels the passion for ballet from the other dancers and regains her confidence in pursuing what she loves regardless of fame. The club members come to Jessi's ballet performance with a few of their charges, Derek reveals that he will move to Los Angeles for more acting opportunities, and Jessi's family takes everyone out for ice cream.
15	5	"Mary Anne and the Great Romance"	Kimmy Gatewood	Dan Robert & Lisha Brooks	October 11, 2021
Logan gives Mary Anne a bracelet at school and they agree to be a couple just before Valentine's Day. The club is happy for Mary Anne but also makes her and Logan sit at the couples lounge at lunch and excludes her from Valentine's Day celebration. Mary Anne feels the difficulty to even talk to Logan after they become a couple and grows nervous about her and Logan's date on Valentine's Day at Salvatore's. At the restaurant, Mary Anne insists on having a double date after meeting Richard and Sharon by coincidence, and the evening ends in disaster as Logan leaves as soon as his mother comes to pick him up. At home, Mary Anne feels inspired to go as "no labels" after hearing Richard and Sharon's success in a relationship without marriage. Mary Anne calls Logan and the two agree to be friends again. While working on her family tree project, Karen comes up with a story about "The Crying Lady", and things grow more suspicious when Kristy actually hears the Crying Lady at night. The Crying Lady turns out to be Liz crying in the bathroom, feeling overwhelmed by the pressures she kept to herself. In the end, instead of a big marriage announcement like Mary Anne and Dawn have anticipated, Richard and Sharon announce that Mary Anne and Richard will be moving into Dawn and Sharon's house for a week as their house gets fumigated after a termite infestation.
16	6	"Dawn and the Wicked Stepsister"	Kimmy Gatewood	Ryan O'Connell	October 11, 2021
Mary Anne and Richard temporarily move in with Dawn and Sharon. Dawn welcomes Mary Anne with an open heart, but challenges ensue when Mary Anne gets scared by the secret passage in Dawn's closet and Dawn is frustrated by Mary Anne's paranoia, which cumulates to them confronting each other at a club meeting. The next day, Mary Anne goes into the secret passage to face her fears, Dawn follows her but accidentally locks both of them inside. Dawn explodes at Mary Anne for taking away everything that she owns, and they reconcile when they share their true feelings out loud. Byron trips while running around the house, and the club helps Mallory to plan a birthday party for Claire after the Pike family spent their money on treating Byron's injuries. Mallory feels uncomfortable with the club's help, especially after Stacey announces that the club can skip the charity donations for the month to spend the money on the party. Everyone reassures Mallory that they are helping her because they are friends and not because they feel sympathetic for her.
17	7	"Claudia and the Sad Goodbye"	Robert Luketic	Sascha Rothchild	October 11, 2021
Mimi died in her sleep at night, and the Kishi family decides to have a funeral in the traditional way as Mimi has intended. Distraught by the new reality in her home without Mimi, Claudia moves to Stacey's house and tries her best to suppress her grief with distractions, including having a club meeting at Kristy's house. The night after Mimi's funeral, Claudia comes to Mary Anne's house after learning that Stacey's parents have been arguing a lot since Edward, Stacey's dad, was on a new account at work. Mary Anne urges Claudia to let out her grief and treat it as a process to grow. Back at her house, Claudia finds Janine going through Mimi's jewelry with Ashley. It is revealed that Ashley is Janine's girlfriend, and Mimi wanted to give Ashley something to show her support for their relationship before she died. Claudia invites her friends, her parents, as well as Janine and Ashley, to have tea together, and they share stories about their best memories with Mimi.
18	8	"Kristy and the Baby Parade"	Kimmy Gatewood	Rachel Shukert	October 11, 2021
Stoneybrook decides to bring back its annual Baby Parade for the 80th anniversary, and Kristy and Watson, along with other past winners, will be on a special ride (though Kristy is less than thrilled). The club decides to enter a float, adapting Mallory's idea of "The Old Woman who Lived in a Shoe". Kristy's dad contacts Liz and says he will come to the Baby Parade with his girlfriend and their new baby. Upon hearing the news, the Thomas children, especially Kristy and David Michael, plan for the visit in their own way. On the day of the parade, the club's float collapses on itself, and Kristy's dad cancels his plans at the last minute. Watson rants about how irresponsible Kristy's dad is and expresses his interest in officially adopting Kristy and her brothers, which deeply touches Kristy. The club's float enters the parade after Mallory fixes it with some innovative touches, and the baby costume Mimi designed wins first prize.

== Production ==
=== Development ===
In February 2019, Netflix ordered a 10-episode reboot based on The Baby-Sitters Club with Ann M. Martin as producer, Rachel Shukert as showrunner, and Michael De Luca and Lucia Aniello as executive producers. Aniello also directed. On October 28, 2020, Netflix renewed the series for a second season. Filming for the second season finished on April 28, 2021, after three months of shooting.

=== Casting ===
Alicia Silverstone and Mark Feuerstein joined the cast in August 2019. In March 2020, Sophie Grace, Malia Baker, Momona Tamada, Shay Rudolph and Xochitl Gomez joined the cast of the series. On March 18, 2021, it was reported that Kyndra Sanchez joined the cast as Dawn Schafer, replacing Gomez due to scheduling conflicts with Doctor Strange in the Multiverse of Madness.

=== Design ===
Cynthia Ann Summers is the series' costume designer. She told Vulture, "We definitely wanted to make sure that, whenever we could, we'd give a nod to the style of the '90s and even some of the book covers." One notable piece is Claudia's yellow plaid pantsuit, a reference to Clueless.

Summers told Refinery29, "Most of the characters' [looks] were purchased from places these girls would shop in real life: Zara, H&M, American Eagle, Gap, Urban Outfitters, Aritzia, Topshop, Kate Spade, Alice + Olivia, Anthropologie, Nordstrom . . . Because we shot in Canada, 80 percent of everyone's fashion was purchased at Simons in Vancouver. Also lots and lots of vintage shopping and upcycling."

== Release ==
The series was initially set to premiere in May 2020, but was delayed to July because of dubbing issues with international programming. The ten-episode first season of The Baby-Sitters Club premiered on July 3, 2020. The eight-episode second season was released on October 11, 2021.

=== Cancellation ===
On March 11, 2022, it was reported the series was cancelled by Netflix after two seasons. While the series had received critical acclaim and developed a fan following, it had purportedly "not been able to attract a wide audience; the eight-episode Season 2, released October 11, failed to crack Nielsen's Top 10 weekly streaming rankings and only appeared in the Netflix Top 10 for one week at No. 9."

In an interview with Vulture, showrunner Rachel Shukert said producers had surmised Netflix was not moving forward with a third season since the beginning of February 2022. According to Shukert, viewership for the first season met and even exceeded Netflix's expectations, but the streaming service grew to prioritize shows that viewers binged (completing new seasons quickly) upon release.

Shukert added, "A lot of times, Netflix things come out and for whatever reason, if the algorithm doesn't put it in front of you, no one knows it's on. I heard from so many people who loved season one that they didn't even know season two had come out. How is that possible? How does the algorithm not know that you watched and loved the entire first season and then immediately show season two to you? Why is this not getting in front of people that want to watch it?"

Vulture writer Kathryn VanArendonk opined, "For fans, the end of The Baby-Sitters Club is disappointing because so few series fill its specific niche: stories about preteen girls that don't oversexualize or infantilize them," which Shukert agreed with by saying, "It seems like girls are expected to go straight from Doc McStuffins to Euphoria."

== Reception ==
=== Critical response ===
The series received critical acclaim. For the first season, review aggregator Rotten Tomatoes reported an approval rating of 100% based on 55 reviews, with an average rating of 8.57/10. The website's critical consensus reads, "Sweet, sincere, and full of hope, The Baby-Sitters Club's grounded approach honors its source material while updating the story for a new generation." On Metacritic, it has a weighted average score of 87 out of 100 based on 18 reviews, indicating "universal acclaim".

Critics praised the show for managing to be both current and also true to the book series' spirit. Meghan O'Keefe of Decider praised the fourth episode of the first season for its portrayal of a transgender child and wrote the series is "unabashedly feminist" and "does more than just affirm that transgender children exist and matter and are worthy of respect; the show argues for these children's rights."

Writing for The Guardian, Lucy Mangan said, "What could have been a sugary nostalgia-fest or worse a reboot that indulged the apparently insatiable urge to sex up material from a more innocent time, regardless of the age and/or continued innocence of its audience, is in fact a funny, fresh reimagining. Building on Martin's solid, good-hearted tales, it maintains a contemporary feel without losing the old-fashioned charm at its heart." Writing for the Hollywood Reporter, Robyn Bahr called the show "not only warm and effervescent, [but] downright among the best shows the streaming platform has produced to date."

Rebecca Onion of Slate said, "The new show is indeed adorable—the multiracial group of suburban middle schoolers earnestly booking gigs from their perch in Claudia Kishi's colorful bedroom is just as plucky and kind as ever . . . The new show has gotten plaudits for its diverse cast and plotlines, but in many important ways, the whole idea is a pure fantasy: of suburban community, of gentle coming-of-age, of meaningful work that teaches responsibility and pays just enough for fancy new paintbrushes."

Widespread acclaim was given to the series' young cast. Petrana Radulovic of Polygon said, "Like their book counterparts, all the girls in The Baby-Sitters Club are more in-depth than their one-word trope descriptor (tomboy, goody two-shoes, artsy kid, prep, hippie) implies, thanks in part to the skillful performances from the young actresses. As spunky, outspoken Kristy, Sophie Grace adds nuance to her bossy, bratty attitude, grounding what could be an over-the-top performance with some tender moments. Momona Tamada, of To All the Boys I've Loved Before fame, captures Claudia's quirkiness and energy, but not without pangs of isolation because she feels her family will never understand her."

Kelly Lawler, writing for USA Today, said the show was "optimistic but not deluded, youthful but not juvenile and sweet but not mawkish. Its quintet of young actresses (the original four sitters and one mid-season addition) are talented beyond their years, but the dialogue never makes them sound like 40-year-old Hollywood scriptwriters." Hank Stuever, writing for The Washington Post, noted "the show's remarkably talented cast of young actresses, all of whom either never learned the kidz-show style of overacting ('schmacting,' we sometimes call it), or were never afflicted with it to begin with. They are wholly believable in the roles of these idealized youths, with especially good performances from Tamada and Baker."

Jenny Singer, writing for Glamour, called the show "both unbelievably wholesome and seriously entertaining. The girls buy a landline phone on Etsy, hit up local parents with targeted Instagram ads, and make comments like, 'Art shouldn't be only the province of the privileged!' Their comedy is funny, their trauma is real, their style choices (by costume designer Cynthia Ann Summers) slay."

The second season has a 100% approval rating on Rotten Tomatoes, based on 12 reviews, with an average rating of 8.6/10. The website's critics consensus states, "The Baby-Sitters Club returns with a strong second season that explores new issues with care and gives its charming cast plenty of room to shine."

=== Accolades ===
Year	Award	Category	Nominee	Result	Ref.
2021	Artios Awards	Children's Pilot and Series (Live Action)	Amber Horn, Danielle Aufiero and Tiffany Mak	Won	
2021	Daytime Emmy Awards	Outstanding Preschool, Children's or Family Viewing Program	Rachel Shukert, Lucia Aniello, Lucy Kitada, Naia Cucukov, Michael De Luca, Frank Smith, Benjamin Forrer, Joanna Calo, Lyle Friedman, Ashley Glazier, Meg Schave and Ann M. Martin	Nominated	
2021	Daytime Emmy Awards	Outstanding Limited Performance in a Children's Program	Alicia Silverstone	Nominated	
2021	Daytime Emmy Awards	Outstanding Younger Performer in a Children's Program	Sophie Grace	Won	
2021	Daytime Emmy Awards	Outstanding Directing Team for a Preschool, Children's or Family Viewing Program	Lucia Aniello, Linda Mendoza, Luke Matheny, Andrew DeYoung, Heather Jack and Kimmy Gatewood	Nominated	
2021	Daytime Emmy Awards	Outstanding Writing Team for a Preschool, Children's or Family Viewing Program	Rachel Shukert, Joanna Calo, Lyle Friedman, Rheeqrheeq Chainey, Jade Chang, Dan Robert, Lisa Brooks, Lucia Aniello and Ariel Karlin	Nominated	
2021	Daytime Emmy Awards	Outstanding Cinematography	Adam Silver, Mikey Jechort and Brett Manyluk	Nominated	
2021	Daytime Emmy Awards	Outstanding Costume Design/Styling	Cynthia Summers, Kelsey Chobotar, Sanchia Wong, Anthony Lewis and Daria Magnusson	Won	
2021	GLAAD Media Awards	Outstanding Kids & Family Programming	The Baby-Sitters Club	Nominated	
2021	TCA Awards	Outstanding Achievement in Youth Programming	The Baby-Sitters Club	Won	
2022	Children's and Family Emmy Awards	Outstanding Children's or Family Viewing Series	The Baby-Sitters Club	Won	
2022	Children's and Family Emmy Awards	Outstanding Lead Performance in a Preschool, Children's or Young Teen Program	Mark Feuerstein	Nominated	
2022	Children's and Family Emmy Awards	Outstanding Lead Performance in a Preschool, Children's or Young Teen Program	Alicia Silverstone	Nominated	
2022	Children's and Family Emmy Awards	Outstanding Younger Performer in a Preschool, Children's or Young Teen Program	Malia Baker	Nominated	
2022	Children's and Family Emmy Awards	Outstanding Younger Performer in a Preschool, Children's or Young Teen Program	Momona Tamada	Nominated	
2022	Children's and Family Emmy Awards	Outstanding Directing for a Single Camera Program	Kimmy Gatewood, Robert Luketic	Nominated	
2022	Children's and Family Emmy Awards	Outstanding Writing for a Live Action Preschool or Children's Program	Lisha Brooks, Rheeqrheeq Chainey, Ryan O'Connell, Dan Robert, Sascha Rothchild and Rachel Shukert	Won	
2022	Children's and Family Emmy Awards	Outstanding Makeup and Hairstyling	Florencia Cepeda, Ceilidh Dunn	Nominated	
2022	Kids' Choice Awards	Favorite Kids TV Show	The Baby-Sitters Club	Nominated	
2022	Kids' Choice Awards	Favorite Female TV Star (Kids)	Malia Baker	Nominated	
2022	TCA Awards	Outstanding Achievement in Youth Programming	The Baby-Sitters Club	Won	
2023	Artios Awards	Children's Pilot and Series (Live Action)	Danielle Aufiero, Amber Horn, Tiffany Mak and Leigh Ann Smith	Won	
