= Santiago of the Seas =

American animated television series

- Genre: Action; Adventure; Educational
- Created by: Niki Lopez; Leslie Valdes; Valerie Walsh Valdes
- Voices of: Kevin Chacon; Justice Quiroz; Alyssa Cheatham; Valentino Cortes
- Composers: Alfonso G. Aguilar; Ego Plum (season 1)
- Country of origin: United States
- Original languages: English; Spanish
- No. of seasons: 2
- No. of episodes: 48

Production
- Executive producers: Leslie Valdes (season 1); Valerie Walsh Valdes (season 1); Dave Palmer (season 1); Niki Lopez (season 2); Tony Gama-Lobo (season 2)
- Running time: 11 minutes (regular); 22 minutes (specials)
- Production companies: Walsh Valdés Productions (season 1); Nickelodeon Animation Studio

Original release
- Network: Nickelodeon (2020–23); Nick Jr. (2023)
- Release: October 9, 2020 – July 27, 2023

Santiago of the Seas is an American animated television series created by Niki Lopez, Leslie Valdes, and Valerie Walsh Valdes that aired on Nickelodeon from October 9, 2020, to January 13, 2023, and Nick Jr. from July 3 to July 27, 2023. The series features the voices of Kevin Chacon, Justice Quiroz, Alyssa Cheatham, and Valentino Cortes.

On February 18, 2021, the series was renewed for a second season, which premiered on January 7, 2022.

On March 28, 2024, the series was removed from Paramount+ as part of a "strategic decision to focus on content with mass global appeal".

== Premise ==
The show follows Santiago Montes, an 8-year-old pirate, and his crew as they embark on rescues, uncover hidden treasures and keeps the Caribbean high seas safe. The show is infused with Spanish language and Latino-Caribbean culture and curriculum.

== Characters ==
=== Main ===
- Santiago Montes (voiced by Kevin Chacon in season 1, Valentino Cortes in late season 1 to early season 2 and Dean Scott Vazquez in the rest of season 2) an 8-year old Latino boy who becomes a pirate, and leader of his crew after finding the legendary treasure of Capitán Calavera.
- Tomás (voiced by Justice Quiroz in season 1 to early season 2 and Mason Vazquez in the rest of season 2) Santiago's cousin and sidekick whose guitar makes special sonic sounds.
- Lorelai (voiced by Alyssa Cheatham) Santiago's best friend and other sidekick from Merlandia, who can transform into a mermaid by using her magic pearl bracelet.

=== Villains ===
- Bonnie Bones (voiced by Kyndra Sanchez) a sneaky and nefarious pirate who likes to steal treasure to become Queen of the Pirates.
- Sir Butterscotch (voiced by John Leguizamo in season 1 and Eric Lopez in season 2) a clumsy palm crow who is Bonnie's sidekick.
- Pepito (voiced by Robin de Jesús)

== Release ==
The series premiered on October 9, 2020, on Nickelodeon and on the Nick Jr. Channel internationally. On March 28, 2024, the series was removed from Paramount+ by Paramount Global as part of a "strategic decision to focus on content with mass global appeal."

== Episodes ==
=== Series overview ===
Season	Episodes		Originally released		
Season	Episodes		First released	Last released	Network
1	21		October 9, 2020	November 19, 2021	Nickelodeon
2	37	21	January 7, 2022	January 13, 2023	Nickelodeon
2	37	16	July 3, 2023	July 27, 2023	Nick Jr.

=== Season 1 (2020–21) ===
No. overall	No. in season	Title	Written by	Storyboarded by	Original release date	Prod. code	U.S. viewers (millions)
1	1	"The Legend of Capitán Calavera"	Story by : Niki Lopez, Leslie Valdes & Valerie Walsh Valdes; Teleplay by : Leslie Valdes & Valerie Walsh Valdes	Monica Davila & David Knott (directors); Phil Allora, Lee-Roy Lahey & Brittany McCarthy	October 9, 2020	101	0.66
At the Pirate Fiesta, Abuelo shows Santiago the statue of Capitán Calavera, whose Santiago's inspiration to become a pirate like him. Calavera has always been finding new treasure, but it hasn't been seen in a long time. Santiago starts finding the treasure to return it to Isla Encanto. His cousin, Tomás, made him a hat to make him feel like a pirate, which would later swim away after Tomás gives him a hug. Santiago starts getting powers and has his hat back. Crabs form a X on a spot and Santiago finds Calavera's treasure under the sand. The treasure opens with Calavera's magic compass inside. Bonnie Bones breaks in as she steals the treasure with her crew of cats. The compass gives Santiago Calavera's ship named "El Bravo", as well as Calavera's clothes, meaning that he is now the new pirate captain and protector. Santiago brings his cousin Tomás to the ship to be his first mate. The ship gives Tomás powers with guitar, which give the flags some wind. To move "El Bravo", Santiago gives out commands to work it out, and it works. With Santiago coming with his ship "El Bravo", Bonnie tries to stop him with her "Super Duper Gooey Slime" cannons, which does work. Santiago and Tomás call Lorelai, a mermaid, to help them get out of goo. Lorelai uses a swordfish to cut off the goo, and joins Santiago's crew with turn into her human form. Bonnie goes to Shark's Teeth Reef, a foggy area, in which Santiago's crew would command "El Bravo" to get a speed boost. Santiago breaks in Bonnie's ship to get his treasure back. Santiago uses Calavera's magic sword to stop Bonnie from getting the treasure. However, Bonnie secretly stole his pet frog Kiko from him. Santiago trades everything he had for his pet, and Bonnie gets the treasure back. Taking his ship, Bonnie become the "queen" of the pirate but Santiago still has his sword to control the ship. Santiago saves Bonnie and Tomás saves Kiko, his stuff only works for him as he is brave and has a heart. The cats punish Bonnie by rip a ripping rope and get her stuck again. Everyone cheers for Santiago for finding the treasure, as well as his crewmates. Santiago's mother gives Santiago Calavera's journal to write down future adventures.
2	2	"The Magic Spyglass"	Leslie Valdes	James Lopez (director); Aaron Brewer, Lee-Roy Lahey & Ryan Stapleton	October 16, 2020	104	0.50
2	2	"The Stone of Life"	JP Meier	James Lopez (director); Lee-Roy Lahey	October 16, 2020	104	0.50
3	3	"To the Lighthouse"	Valerie Walsh Valdes	James Lopez (director); Lee-Roy Lahey	October 23, 2020	103	0.35
3	3	"The Golden Giant"	JP Meier	James Lopez (director); Lee-Roy Lahey	October 23, 2020	103	0.35
4	4	"Princess and the Pirate Puppy"	Dana Chan	Monica Davila (director); Megan Ruiz G.	October 30, 2020	105	0.49
4	4	"Caracol Cove"	Maria Escobedo	David Knott (director); Waymond Singleton	October 30, 2020	105	0.49
5	5	"The Night of the Turtles"	Melinda LaRose	Monica Davila (director); Aaron Brewer	November 6, 2020	106	0.38
5	5	"Santiago's Regatta"	Jorge Aguirre	Monica Davila (director); Brittany McCarthy	November 6, 2020	106	0.38
6	6	"A Pirate Christmas"	Dana Chan	David Knott & James Lopez (directors); Lee-Roy Lahey & Waymond Singleton	November 20, 2020	114	0.42
7	7	"The Treasure in the Sky"	Stacey Greenberger	David Knott (director); Cole Harrington	January 8, 2021	108	0.32
7	7	"Sidekick Switcheroo"	Rodney Stringfellow	David Knott (director); Waymond Singleton	January 8, 2021	108	0.32
8	8	"Cecilia and the Magic Rubies"	Leslie Valdes	Monica Davila (director); Brittany McCarthy	January 15, 2021	120	0.55
8	8	"Under the Pirate Moon"	Dana Chan	Monica Davila (director); Brittany McCarthy	January 15, 2021	120	0.55
9	9	"The Treasure of El Bravo"	Dana Chan	Monica Davila & David Knott (directors); Aaron Brewer & Cole Harrington	February 5, 2021	107	0.31
10	10	"Lorelai's Bracelet"	Rodney Stringfellow	David Knott (director); Cole Harrington	February 19, 2021	102	0.38
10	10	"Cecilia And The Ghost Ship"	Dana Chan	David Knott (director); Waymond Singleton	February 19, 2021	102	0.38
11	11	"Shrunken Ships"	Dana Chan	James Lopez (director); Lee-Roy Lahey	March 12, 2021	111	0.36
11	11	"The Pirate Parade"	Rogelio Martinez	Monica Davila (director); Aaron Brewer	March 12, 2021	111	0.36
12	12	"Santiago's Greatest Treasure"	Jorge Aguirre	James Lopez (director); Kelsey Wooley	March 19, 2021	109	0.41
12	12	"The Golden Banana Treasure"	Rodney Stringfellow	James Lopez (director); Kelsey Wooley	March 19, 2021	109	0.41
13	13	"The Silver Lasso"	Jorge Aguirre	David Knott (director); Cole Harrington	April 30, 2021	113	0.35
13	13	"The Sea Dragon's Treasure"	Rogelio Martinez	Monica Davila (director); Megan Ruiz G.	April 30, 2021	113	0.35
14	14	"The Curse of the Gold Falcon"	Rodney Stringfellow	James Lopez (director); Kelsey Wooley	May 14, 2021	115	0.21
14	14	"The Island of Lost Things"	JP Meier	David Knott (director); Waymond Singleton	May 14, 2021	115	0.21
15	15	"The Enchanted Melody"	Melinda LaRose	James Lopez (director); Kelsey Wooley	June 11, 2021	110	0.26
15	15	"Chicken Abuelo"	Jorge Aguirre	David Knott (director); Waymond Singleton	June 11, 2021	110	0.26
16	16	"Tomás's Birthday Surprise"	JP Meier	Monica Davila (director); Aaron Brewer	July 9, 2021	116	0.44
16	16	"Family Treasure Hunt"	Melinda LaRose	Monica Davila (director); Aaron Brewer	July 9, 2021	116	0.44
17	17	"Triton's Trumpet"	Rodney Stringfellow	Monica Davila (director); Megan Ruiz G.	July 16, 2021	118	0.29
17	17	"The Curse of the Pirate Baby"	Dana Chan	James Lopez (director); Kelsey Wooley	July 16, 2021	118	0.29
18	18	"Santiago and Bonnie to the Rescue"	Dana Chan	David Knott (director); Cole Harrington	September 24, 2021	117	0.22
18	18	"The Compass Caper"	Maria Escobedo	James Lopez (director); Lee-Roy Lahey	September 24, 2021	117	0.22
19	19	"The Mysterious Island"	Melinda LaRose	David Knott (director); Cole Harrington	October 21, 2021	119	0.24
19	19	"Mystery of the Vam-Pirates"	Niki Lopez	Monica Davila (director); Aaron Brewer	October 21, 2021	119	0.24
20	20	"Pirate Play Along Adventure"	Michelle Glenn & Danielle Luzzi	Michelle Glenn & Danielle Luzzi (also directors)	November 12, 2021	999	0.24
21	21	"Deep Freeze"	JP Meier	Monica Davila (director); Megan Ruiz G.	November 19, 2021	112	0.22
21	21	"The Trojan Seahorse"	Rodney Stringfellow	James Lopez (director); Kelsey Wooley	November 19, 2021	112	0.22

=== Season 2 (2022–23) ===
No. overall	No. in season	Title	Written by	Storyboarded by	Original release date	Prod. code	U.S. viewers (millions)
Nickelodeon
22	1	"The Stones of Power"	Tony Gama-Lobo	Chris Graham (director); Josh McKenzie & Jam Respicio	January 7, 2022	201	0.32
23	2	"Pirate Treasure Playoff"	Michelle Glenn & Danielle Luzzi	Michelle Glenn & Danielle Luzzi (directors); Way Singleton & April Amezquita	March 11, 2022	TBA	0.24
Santiago hosts the Pirate Treasure Playoff. However, he, along with Tomas and Lorelai, has been captured by the Evil Pirate Trio: Bonnie, Enrique, and Escarlata, and they took over his role as the hosts of the Pirate Treasure Playoff. Now, the audience must participate to solve the riddles, win the pirate treasure, and save Santiago and his Good Pirate Crew before the rope on the cage breaks.
24	3	"The Finceañera"	Talia Rothenberg	Chris Graham (director); Josh McKenzie & Angelica Russell	March 25, 2022	202	0.28
25	4	"A Tale of Two-más"	Niki Lopez	Chris Graham (director); Josh McKenzie, Jam Respicio & Angelica Russell	April 8, 2022	203	0.31
26	5	"The Trials of the Pirate Protector"	JP Meier	Brianne Drouhard & Nico Selma (directors); Renee Faundo, Josh McKenzie, Jam Respicio & Kelsey Wooley	June 24, 2022	204	0.33
27	6	"Whale of a Tale"	Lauren Gauthier	Kathryn Marusik (director); Renee Faundo	July 1, 2022	205A	0.22
28	7	"The Pirate Painter"	Niki Lopez	Brianne Drouhard (director); Kelsey Wooley	July 8, 2022	205B	0.27
29	8	"The Fruit Festival"	Angela Entzminger	Nico Selma (director); Robert Souza	July 15, 2022	206A	0.22
30	9	"Abuelo's Treasure"	Talia Rothenberg	Kathryn Marusik (director); Aaron Batara & Renee Faundo	July 22, 2022	206B	0.28
31	10	"The Time Capsule"	Joshua Horkison	Brianne Drouhard (director); Josh McKenzie	September 19, 2022	210A	0.23
32	11	"Hiccup Soup"	Lauren Gauthier	Nico Selma (director); Jam Respicio	September 20, 2022	210B	0.25
33	12	"Comet Cupcakes"	Lissy Klatchko	Kathryn Marusik (director); Renee Faundo	September 21, 2022	211A	0.22
34	13	"Tina's New Friend"	JP Meier	Brianne Drouhard (director); Kelsey Wooley	September 22, 2022	211B	0.24
35	14	"Peek-A-Boo"	Niki Lopez	Nico Selma (director); Robert Souza	October 19, 2022	212	0.29
35	14	"Night of the Witches"	Cynthia Reynoso	Kathryn Marusik (director); Angela Entzminger	October 19, 2022	212	0.29
36	15	"Bonnie's Mom"	Maria Escobedo	Brianne Drouhard (director); Josh McKenzie	November 14, 2022	207	0.22
36	15	"The Ocelot's Tale"	Tony Gama-Lobo	Nico Selma (director); Jam Respicio	November 14, 2022	207	0.22
37	16	"Kiko's Song"	Jeannette Lara	Kathryn Marusik (director); Renee Faundo	November 15, 2022	208	0.21
37	16	"Return to Merlandia"	Talia Rothenberg	Brianne Drouhard (director); Kelsey Wooley	November 15, 2022	208	0.21
38	17	"Chickcharney Island"	Conor Biddle & Matthew Fichandler	Nico Selma (director); Robert Souza	November 16, 2022	209	0.13
38	17	"The Lost Girl in the Canoe"	Freddie Gutierrez	Kathryn Marusik (director); Angela Entzminger	November 16, 2022	209	0.13
39	18	"The Kitty Cat Caper"	Megan Gonzalez	Kathryn Marusik (director); Renee Faundo	November 17, 2022	214	0.23
39	18	"The Legend of El Ratoncio Pérez"	Ellen Tremiti	Brianne Drouhard (director); Kelsey Wooley	November 17, 2022	214	0.23
40	19	"Three Kings Day"	Megan Gonzalez & Talia Rothenberg	Kathryn Marusik, Nico Selma & Kelsey Wooley (directors); April Amezquita & Robert Souza	November 30, 2022	215	0.24
41	20	"The Pirate Party"	Talia Rothenberg	Brianne Drouhard (director); Josh McKenzie	January 6, 2023	213	0.10
41	20	"Dr. Abuela"	Tom Alvarado	Nico Selma (director); Jam Respicio	January 6, 2023	213	0.10
42	21	"Three is a Magic Number"	Tony Gama-Lobo	Brianne Drouhard (director); Josh McKenzie	January 13, 2023	216	0.11
42	21	"Off the Map"	Emman Sadorra	Nico Selma (director); Jam Respicio	January 13, 2023	216	0.11
Nick Jr.
43	22	"Lorelai's Family Vacation"	Yasmine Campbell & Cynthia Reynoso	Brianne Drouhard & Nico Selma (directors); Josh McKenzie & Jam Respicio	July 3, 2023	222	0.15
44	23	"The Giddy-Up Games"	Megan Gonzalez	Brianne Drouhard (director); Josh McKenzie	July 4, 2023	219	N/A
44	23	"The Golden Guitar"	Cynthia Reynoso	Nico Selma (director); Jam Respicio	July 4, 2023	219	N/A
45	24	"Sky Pirates"	Tony Gama-Lobo & Talia Rothenberg	Nico Selma & Kelsey Wooley (directors); April Amezquita & Robert Souza	July 5, 2023	224	N/A
46	25	"Sky Pirates"	Megan Gonzalez & Michael Molina	Brianne Drouhard & Nico Selma (directors); Josh McKenzie & Jam Respicio	July 6, 2023	225	N/A
47	26	"The Secret Room"	Travis Gunn	Kathryn Marusik & Kelsey Wooley (directors); Renee Faundo	July 10, 2023	217A	0.11
48	27	"Little Shrimp, Big Problems"	Lauren Gauthier	Brianne Drouhard (director); Kelsey Wooley	July 11, 2023	217B	0.07
49	28	"Pig Island"	Conor Biddle & Matthew Fichandler	Nico Selma (director); Sofia Canales & Robert Souza	July 12, 2023	218A	0.13
50	29	"The Lost Treasure of Merlandia"	Talia Rothenberg	Kathryn Marusik & Kelsey Wooley (directors); April Amezquita	July 13, 2023	218B	N/A
51	30	"Nacho Supreme"	Michael Molina	Kelsey Wooley (director); Renee Faundo	July 17, 2023	220A	0.14
52	31	"Sea Cows"	Lissy Klatchko	Brianne Drouhard (director); Daniela Rodriguez de la Peña	July 18, 2023	220B	0.17
53	32	"Mother's Day on the High Seas"	Maria Escobedo	Nico Selma (director); Robert Souza	July 19, 2023	221A	0.15
54	33	"Bonnie's Bones"	Megan Gonzalez	Brianne Drouhard (director); Daniela Rodriguez de la Peña	July 20, 2023	221B	0.11
55	34	"Lost & Flounder"	Michael Molina	Kelsey Wooley (director); Renee Faundo	July 24, 2023	TBA	N/A
56	35	"Rumble in the Jungle"	Talia Rothenberg	Kelsey Wooley (director); April Amezquita	July 25, 2023	TBA	N/A
57	36	"Escarlata's Little Sister" "Big Sister Escarlata"	Kate Jorgensen & Michael Molina	Kelsey Wooley (director); Renee Faundo	July 26, 2023	TBA	N/A
58	37	"Bad News Pirates"	Megan Gonzalez	Brianne Drouhard (director); Josh McKenzie & Daniela Rodriguez de la Peña	July 27, 2023	TBA	N/A

== Reception ==
=== Critical response ===
The series received a positive reception. Emily Ashby of Common Sense Media called the series "exceptional" and praised it for celebrating kindness and courage. She also stated that the series is "visually appealing" and argued that the dedication of the characters to work together and their personalities make for a "feel-good viewing." She further praised the series for exposing preschoolers to the Spanish language through "useful terms that are easily learned" in the context of the series.

=== Awards and nominations ===
Year	Award	Category	Nominee(s)	Result	Refs
2022	Children's and Family Emmy Awards	Outstanding Preschool Animated Series	Santiago of the Seas	Nominated	
