= Xochitl Gomez =

American actress (born 2006)

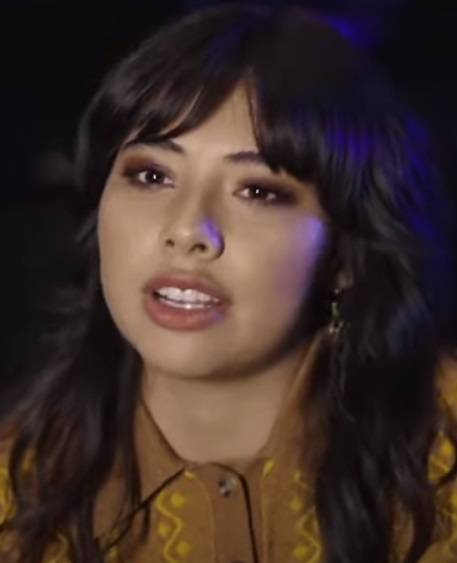
- Gomez in 2022
- Born: Xochitl Gomez-Deines; April 29, 2006 (age 20); Los Angeles, California, U.S.
- Occupation: Actress
- Years active: 2016–present
- Known for: The Baby-Sitters Club Doctor Strange in the Multiverse of Madness Dancing with the Stars

Xochitl Gomez-Deines (/ˈsoʊtʃi/ SOH-chee; born April 29, 2006) is an American actress. She began her career as a child performer in local musical theater productions, student films, and the Disney Channel sitcom Raven's Home (2018). She rose to prominence with her leading role in the Netflix comedy series The Baby-Sitters Club (2020) and her supporting role as America Chavez in the Marvel Cinematic Universe film Doctor Strange in the Multiverse of Madness (2022).

Gomez won the thirty-second season of the ABC competition series Dancing with the Stars with professional dancer Valentin Chmerkovskiy.

== Early life ==
Xochitl Gomez-Deines was born on April 29, 2006, in Los Angeles, California. Both of her parents are of Mexican descent; her mother is a set decorator for feature films, while her father is a construction worker from Morelos. She was raised in Hollywood, and moved to Echo Park at age five. She grew up with "a lot of Mexican influences" since her friends and babysitter were also Mexican, and her parents spoke Spanish at home. Gomez stated that she feels she has "lived in both worlds and that has shaped who [she is] as a person." She has attended public school her entire life.

Gomez took her first musical theater class at age five and began acting in a local production of The Little Mermaid. Gomez continued with musical theater until she was 12 years old, performing in 22 full-length musicals. She also acted in student films. Gomez has cited musical theater as a reason she is passionate about acting. Jennifer Lawrence's performance as Katniss Everdeen in The Hunger Games film series inspired her to pursue a professional acting career. Gomez attended auditions around Los Angeles every day after school for several hours. At times, she would attend four or five daily, an experience she found "crazy." Gomez secured her first parts in commercials at age ten. She found it difficult to book roles because "you would have to be the younger version of an actor or the kid of a famous actor," but she did not resemble any actors. However, Gomez felt her performances in student films helped people notice her talent. She began studying martial arts, including kung fu, at the age of 11 to bolster her acting resume.

== Career ==
Gomez made her onscreen debut in 2018 on the Disney Channel sitcom Raven's Home. She also starred in Shadow Wolves (2019), for which she won a Young Artist Award for Supporting Teen Artist. In March 2020, Gomez joined the cast of The Baby-Sitters Club, an adaptation of Ann M. Martin's novel series of the same name, as Dawn Schafer. Released on Netflix on July 3, 2020, the show garnered critical acclaim. Entertainment Weekly stated: "Gomez delivers Dawn's social-justice-themed dialogue with heartfelt frankness." In March 2021, Netflix recast her role for the show's second season due to scheduling conflicts with Gomez filming Doctor Strange in the Multiverse of Madness (2022).

Gomez starred as America Chavez in Doctor Strange in the Multiverse of Madness. She was 13 when she first auditioned for the role of then-18-year-old America in February 2020. The character was later re-written as a younger teenager. Gomez did martial arts, kickboxing, and stunt training for "every other day for hours," hoping to "blow [the casting directors'] minds" in a potential callback. Six months after her initial audition, Gomez received a callback and did a screen test with Stephen Strange actor Benedict Cumberbatch. She was cast two days later. Aged 16 at the time of Doctor Strange in the Multiverse of Madness's release, Gomez was one of the youngest actors to portray a superhero in the Marvel Cinematic Universe. The film was a commercial success, grossing over $955 million worldwide. Its critical reception was mixed, but Gomez was praised for her role, with Empire writing she "brings impressive warmth and feeling." In August 2022, she was cast in the science fiction thriller film Ursa Major alongside Mary Elizabeth Winstead.

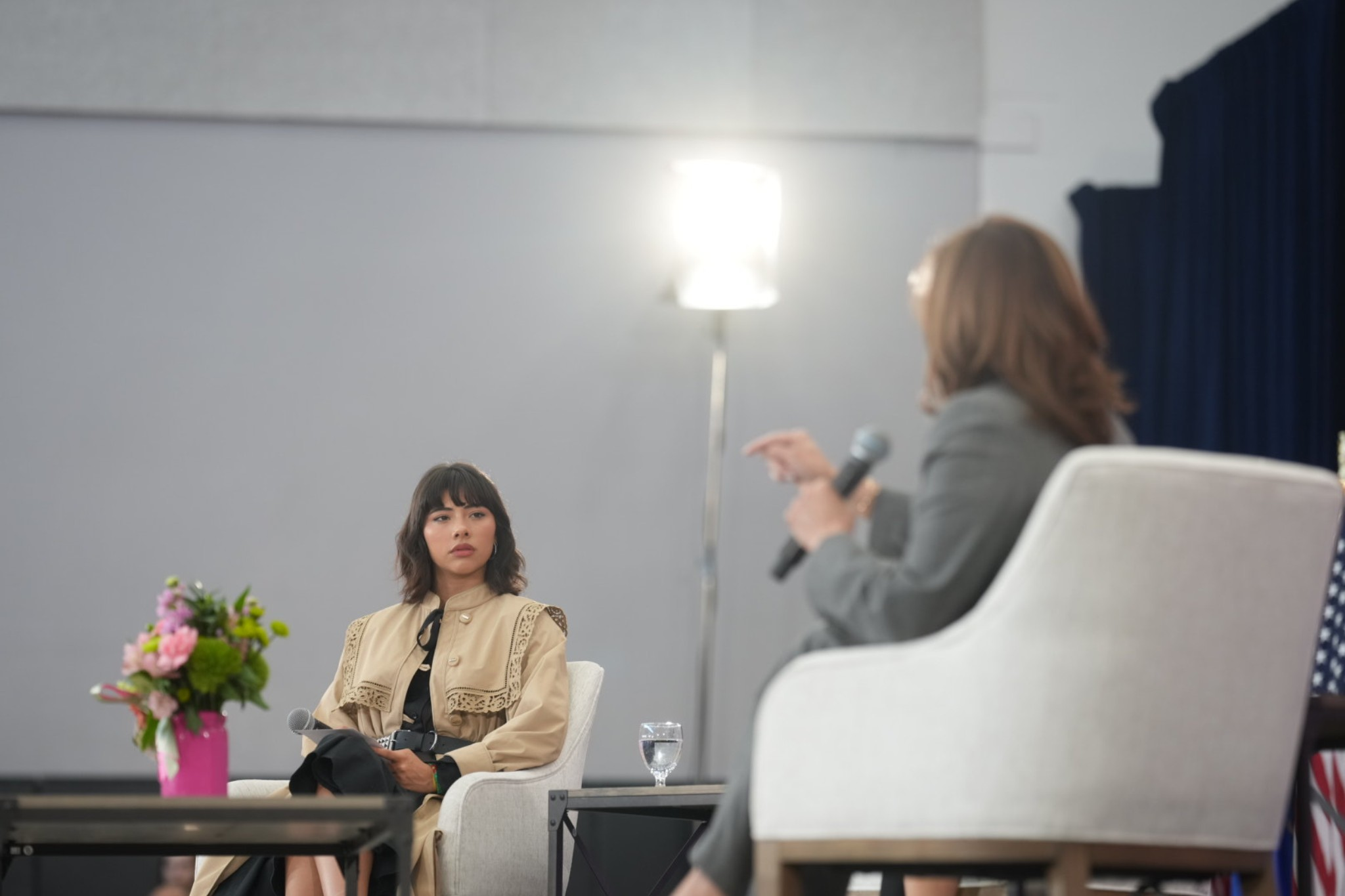
Gomez with Vice President Kamala Harris in April 2024

In 2023, Gomez competed on the thirty-second season of the reality competition series Dancing With the Stars; she was paired with professional dancer Valentin Chmerkovskiy. At 17 years old, she was the youngest celebrity to appear that season. Gomez and Chmerkovskiy won the competition on December 5, 2023, and were awarded the inaugural Len Goodman Mirrorball Trophy. They were the first individual couple of the season to earn a perfect score, and finished at the top of the leaderboard with a perfect score of 120 out of 120 for the final two weeks of the competition. In 2024, Gomez joined on the Dancing with the Stars: Live! tour, and performed with Chmerkovskiy during the finale of season thirty-three. She returned in season thirty-four to compete in a jive relay with conservationist Robert Irwin.

== Personal life ==
Gomez is dyslexic. She marched at the 2017 Women's March and in support of the Black Lives Matter movement. Gomez relocated to Spain on a part-time basis in 2026.

== Filmography ==
Key
Clock	Denotes productions that have not yet been released

=== Film ===
Year	Title	Role	Notes	Ref.
2019	Shadow Wolves	Chucky		
2021	Boob Sweat	Francis	Short; credited as Xochitl Gomez-Deines	
2022	Doctor Strange in the Multiverse of Madness	America Chavez		
2026	Hive	Sasha		
2026	The Cat in the Hat	Gabby (voice role)	Voice role	
2026	Avengers: Doomsday †	America Chavez	Post-production	
TBA	Ursa Major †	Natalie	Post-production	
TBA	Dog Years †	TBA	Post-production	
TBA	Bad Influence †	Kira	Post-production	

=== Television ===
Year	Title	Role	Notes	Ref.
2018	Raven's Home	School Journalist	2 episodes	
2019	You're the Worst	Eclipse Kid	Episode: "The Pillars of Creation"	
2020	Gentefied	Young Ana	Episode: "Brown Love"	
2020	The Baby-Sitters Club	Dawn Schafer	Main role (season 1)	
2023, 2025	Dancing with the Stars	Herself	Season 32 champion; relay partner for Robert Irwin (season 34)	
2025	Cartoonified with Phineas and Ferb	Herself	Voice role; episode: "Xochitl Gomez"	
2025–present	Boston Blue	Penelope 'Penny' Bravo	Recurring role	

=== Music videos ===
Year	Title	Artist	Ref.
2026	"Emilia"	Johnny Orlando	
2026	"KNACK"	Full Circle Boys	

== Accolades ==
Year	Award	Category	Nominated work	Result	Ref.
2020	Young Artist Award	Supporting Teen Artist	Shadow Wolves	Won	
2022	Las Vegas Film Critics Society Awards	Best Female Youth Performance (Under 21)	Doctor Strange in the Multiverse of Madness	Nominated	
2022	Digital Spy Reader Awards	Rising Star	Doctor Strange in the Multiverse of Madness	Nominated	
2022	Forbes 30 Under 30	Hollywood & Entertainment	—N/a	listed	
2024	People's Choice Awards	The Competition Contestant of the Year	Dancing with the Stars	Nominated	
