= Doctor Strange in the Multiverse of Madness =

2022 Marvel Studios film

- Theatrical release poster
- Directed by: Sam Raimi
- Written by: Michael Waldron
- Based on: Marvel Comics
- Produced by: Kevin Feige
- Starring: Benedict Cumberbatch; Elizabeth Olsen; Chiwetel Ejiofor; Benedict Wong; Xochitl Gomez; Michael Stuhlbarg; Rachel McAdams
- Cinematography: John Mathieson
- Edited by: Bob Murawski; Tia Nolan
- Music by: Danny Elfman
- Production company: Marvel Studios
- Distributed by: Walt Disney Studios Motion Pictures
- Release dates: May 2, 2022 (Dolby Theatre); May 6, 2022 (United States)
- Running time: 126 minutes
- Country: United States
- Language: English
- Budget: $414.9 million (gross); $350.6 million (net)
- Box office: $955.8 million

Doctor Strange in the Multiverse of Madness is a 2022 American superhero film based on Marvel Comics featuring the character Doctor Strange. Produced by Marvel Studios and distributed by Walt Disney Studios Motion Pictures, it is the sequel to Doctor Strange (2016) and the 28th film in the Marvel Cinematic Universe (MCU). The film was directed by Sam Raimi, written by Michael Waldron, and stars Benedict Cumberbatch as Stephen Strange, alongside Elizabeth Olsen, Chiwetel Ejiofor, Benedict Wong, Xochitl Gomez, Michael Stuhlbarg, and Rachel McAdams. In the film, Strange must protect America Chavez (Gomez), a teenager capable of traveling the multiverse, from the Scarlet Witch (Olsen).

Doctor Strange director and co-writer Scott Derrickson had plans for a sequel by October 2016. He signed to return as director in December 2018, when Cumberbatch was confirmed to return. The film's title was announced in July 2019 along with Olsen's involvement, while Jade Halley Bartlett was hired to write the film that October. Derrickson stepped down as director in January 2020, citing creative differences. Waldron and Raimi joined the following month and started over, adding elements of the horror genre that Raimi had worked with previously and making Wanda the villain of the film, continuing her story from the Disney+ miniseries WandaVision (2021). Filming began in November 2020 in London but was put on hold in January 2021 due to the COVID-19 pandemic. Production resumed by March 2021 and concluded in mid-April in Somerset. Shooting also occurred in Surrey and Los Angeles. With a production budget of $350.6 million, Doctor Strange in the Multiverse of Madness is one of the most expensive films ever made.

Doctor Strange in the Multiverse of Madness premiered at the Dolby Theatre in Hollywood, Los Angeles, on May 2, 2022, and was released in the United States on May 6, as part of Phase Four of the MCU. The film received generally positive reviews from critics and grossed $955.8 million worldwide, making it the fourth-highest-grossing film of 2022.

== Plot ==
A demon chases America Chavez and a variant of Stephen Strange in the space between universes while searching for the Book of Vishanti. Strange is killed and Chavez accidentally creates a portal that transports herself and Strange's corpse to Earth-616, (Note: The film gives the name Earth-616 to the main reality depicted in the Marvel Cinematic Universe.) where that universe's version of Stephen Strange rescues Chavez from another demon (Note: Identified off-screen as Gargantos) with help from Wong, the Sorcerer Supreme. Chavez explains that the beings are hunting her because she has the power to travel through the multiverse, but is unable to consciously control it.

Recognizing witchcraft runes on the demon, Strange consults Wanda Maximoff but soon realizes that she is responsible for the attacks. After acquiring the Darkhold and becoming the Scarlet Witch, Wanda believes that taking Chavez's powers and traveling through the multiverse will allow her to reunite with Billy and Tommy, the children she created during her time in Westview. (Note: As depicted in the television miniseries WandaVision (2021)) When Strange refuses to surrender Chavez, Wanda attacks Kamar-Taj, kills many sorcerers, and captures Wong. Chavez accidentally transports herself and Strange to Earth-838. Wanda uses the Darkhold to "dreamwalk", taking control of her Earth-838 counterpart who lives a suburban life with her own Billy and Tommy. After a surviving sorceress, Sara, sacrifices herself to destroy the Darkhold and break the dreamwalk, an enraged Wanda forces Wong to lead her to Mount Wundagore, the source of the Darkhold's power, to reestablish the dreamwalk.

While searching for help, Strange and Chavez are apprehended by Earth-838's Sorcerer Supreme, Karl Mordo, and brought before the Illuminati, a group consisting of Mordo, Peggy Carter, Blackagar Boltagon, Maria Rambeau, Reed Richards, and Charles Xavier. They explain that through reckless use of their universe's Darkhold in an attempt to defeat Thanos, Earth-838's Strange triggered a universe-destroying "incursion". After defeating Thanos, the Illuminati executed their Strange to prevent him from causing more harm. Mordo believes that Earth-616's Strange is similarly dangerous, but Wanda reestablishes her dreamwalk at Mount Wundagore and arrives in her Earth-838 counterpart's body before the Illuminati can pass judgment. She brutally kills all the Illuminati except Mordo, whom Strange subdues before fleeing with Chavez. The two escape with help from the Earth-838 version of Strange's ex-fiancé, Christine Palmer, a scientist working with the Illuminati.

Strange, Chavez, and Palmer enter the space between universes to find the Book of Vishanti, which is the antithesis of the Darkhold, but Wanda appears and destroys it. She then takes over Chavez's mind and uses her powers to send Strange and Palmer to an incursion-destroyed universe. Strange defeats the destroyed universe's Strange, who has been corrupted by his Darkhold, and then uses that Darkhold to dreamwalk into the body of his deceased counterpart on Earth-616. With Wong's help, Strange saves Chavez from Wanda and encourages Chavez to use her abilities. Chavez transports Wanda to Earth-838, where she sees Billy and Tommy fearfully recoiling from her while crying for their real mother. Realizing her errors, Wanda relents and uses her powers to bring down Mount Wundagore, simultaneously destroying all copies of the Darkhold throughout the multiverse and sacrificing herself in the process. Chavez returns Strange and Palmer to their respective universes.

Some time later, Kamar-Taj is under repair and the surviving sorcerers, joined by Chavez, continue training. Strange develops a third eye as a result of using the Darkhold and dreamwalking into a corpse. In a mid-credits scene, Strange is approached by a sorceress (Note: Identified off-screen as Clea) who warns that his actions have triggered an incursion that he must help repair. Strange follows her into the Dark Dimension.

== Cast ==
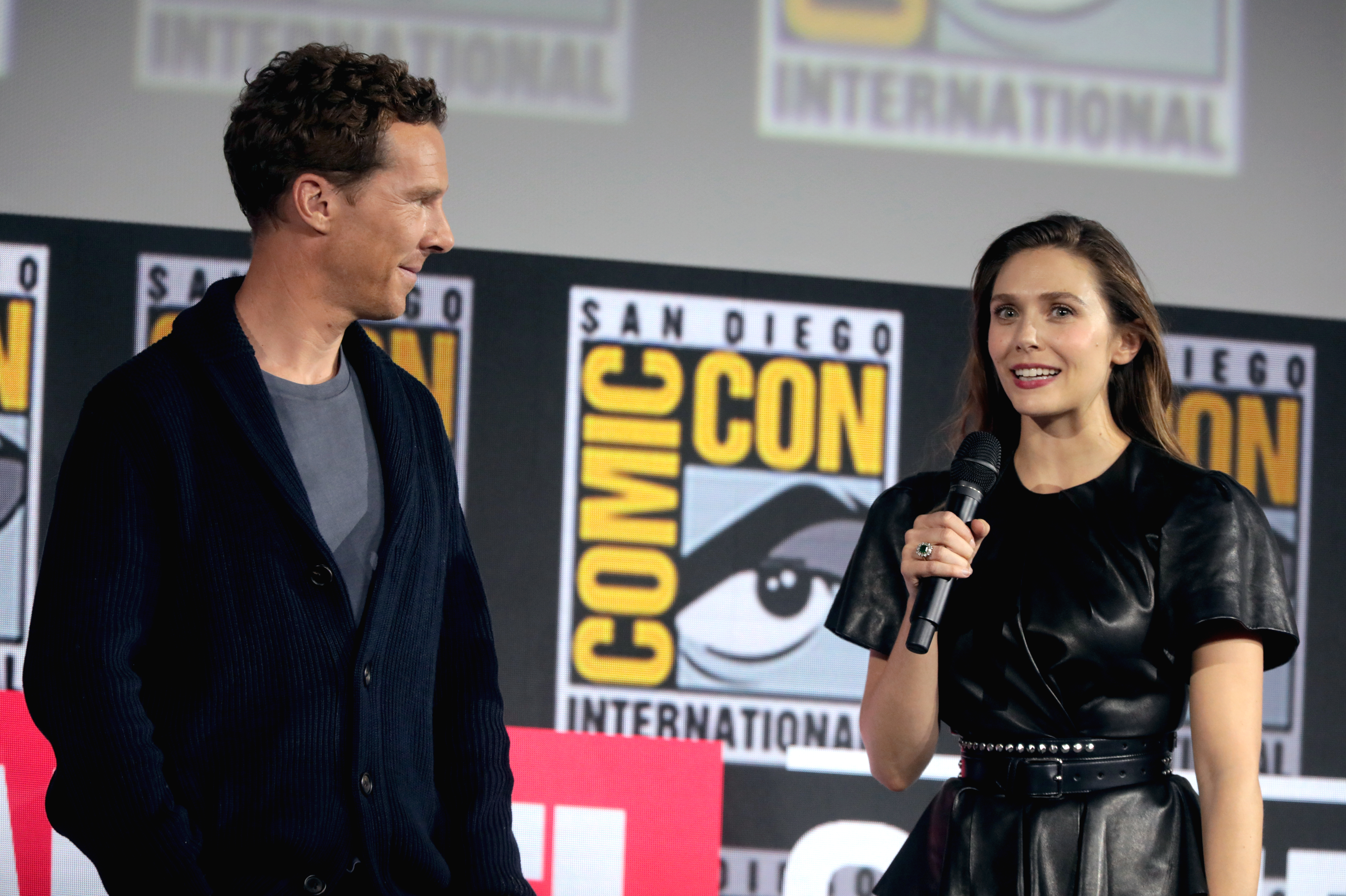
Cumberbatch and Olsen announcing the film at the 2019 San Diego Comic-Con

- Benedict Cumberbatch as Dr. Stephen Strange:
  A neurosurgeon who became a Master of the Mystic Arts following a career-ending car accident. Writer Michael Waldron said Strange was "at the height of his powers" in the film, and compared the character to Indiana Jones as a hero who can "take a punch", but with the intellect of chef Anthony Bourdain. He saw Strange as a "great adventure hero you just like to watch kick ass". Director Sam Raimi explained that Strange begins the film believing that he should be making all decisions, and must learn to "let go a little bit" and trust in others. Cumberbatch also portrays three alternate versions of the character: the Earth-617 version who dies at the beginning of the film and wears a costume inspired by Matt Fraction's 2011 Defenders comic book series; the former Sorcerer Supreme of Earth-838 who founded the Illuminati; and a version who has been corrupted by the Darkhold.
- Elizabeth Olsen as Wanda Maximoff / Scarlet Witch:
  A former Avenger gone rogue who can harness chaos magic, engage in telepathy and telekinesis, and alter reality. The film continues Wanda's "ownership of what makes her unique and the accountability of her life experience" that began in the Disney+ series WandaVision (2021), including using an accent that is more true to her Sokovian heritage after some of the previous MCU projects had seen her use a more Americanized accent. Olsen wanted to ensure Wanda's role in the film honored the events of the series, requesting some adjustments to the film to ensure that it evolved the character rather than repeating moments from WandaVision. She felt the film's portrayal showed a new confidence for the character that was "really empowering", and said it was "okay to play characters that people get frustrated with sometimes". Olsen also portrays the character's Earth-838 counterpart.
- Chiwetel Ejiofor as Karl Mordo:
  The Sorcerer Supreme of Earth-838 and a member of the Illuminati. He is an alternate version from the Mordo seen in the first film, which set him up as a future antagonist. That version does not appear in the sequel because he did not fit into the story, with Waldron explaining that they were focused on the Earth-838 version of the character and felt it was more exciting to leave the Earth-616 version for "another day". An early version of the script included the Earth-616 version of Mordo in an opening sequence in which he would have been killed by Wanda.
- Benedict Wong as Wong:
  The Sorcerer Supreme of Earth-616 and Strange's mentor and friend. The actor was happy to hear that his character would be the Sorcerer Supreme and stand "toe-to-toe with Doctor Strange", serving as the voice of reason for Strange who ultimately faces consequences for ignoring Wong's advice. The actor had more action scenes in this film and prepared by training with former rugby league player Shannon Hegarty.
- Xochitl Gomez as America Chavez:
  A teenager who can travel between dimensions by punching open doorways. She originates from another universe known as the Utopian Parallel. Gomez wanted to remain faithful to the source material despite playing a younger version of the character than is seen in the comics, and said her journey in the film begins with the character having been alone for a long time and "running away from her uniqueness". Chavez has to embrace her abilities and learn to trust others by the film's end. Marvel Studios had been looking for the right film to introduce the character in for a long time before settling on Multiverse of Madness.
- Michael Stuhlbarg as Nicodemus West:
  A surgeon and former colleague of Strange. Stuhlbarg was also planned to portray his Earth-838 counterpart but could only film one scene, as the Earth-616 version, due to scheduling conflicts. The Earth-838 version would have worked for the Illuminati, and the protagonists would have found his head in an elevator after he was killed by Wanda off-screen, similar to the death of Samuel L. Jackson's character Ray Arnold in the film Jurassic Park (1993).
- Rachel McAdams as Christine Palmer:
  An emergency surgeon who was a colleague and lover of Strange. The film explores Strange's decision at the end of the film Doctor Strange (2016) to protect the New York Sanctum and not be with Palmer, despite still having feelings for her and possibly regretting that decision, with Palmer marrying someone else in this film. McAdams also portrays the character's Earth-838 counterpart, who is an employee of the Baxter Foundation and the former lover of that reality's Strange. McAdams described this version of the character as a "Multiversal expert" who allowed her to have more action scenes compared to the first film. She has "a lot more baggage" than the original version of the character due to the Earth-838 version of Strange being corrupted, but her storyline with the Earth-616 Strange helps resolve his love story with his own version of Palmer. Raimi said in 2026 that McAdams was intended to portray another version of the character in a universe added during the film's reshoots that was ultimately cut.

The Illuminati of Earth-838 also includes Patrick Stewart as Professor Charles Xavier, portraying a different version of the character that he previously played in 20th Century Fox's X-Men film series; Hayley Atwell as Peggy Carter / Captain Carter, after voicing another version in the Disney+ animated series What If...? (2021–2024); Lashana Lynch as Maria Rambeau / Captain Marvel, an alternate version of her character from the film Captain Marvel (2019); Anson Mount as Blackagar Boltagon / Black Bolt, an alternate version of his role from Marvel's ABC television series Inhumans (2017); and John Krasinski as Reed Richards, a member of the Fantastic Four.

Julian Hilliard and Jett Klyne portray the Earth-838 versions of Wanda's sons Billy and Tommy, reprising their respective roles from WandaVision, while Topo Wresniwiro reprises his role from the first film as Hamir, a Master of the Mystic Arts. Also appearing in the film are Sheila Atim as Sara, a Master of the Mystic Arts, and Adam Hugill as the voice of Rintrah, a minotaur-like being from R'Vaal who is a student at Kamar-Taj. Ross Marquand voices the Ultron drones that appear on Earth-838. Marquand previously voiced a different version of Ultron in What If...?, replacing James Spader, who portrayed the Earth-616 Ultron in the film Avengers: Age of Ultron (2015). The character Clea is introduced in the mid-credits scene, portrayed by Charlize Theron, and Waldron makes a cameo appearance as a guest at Palmer's wedding. Bruce Campbell, a frequent collaborator with Raimi, briefly appears in both the main film and post-credits scene as the vendor of an Earth-838 food stall called Pizza Poppa. Scott Spiegel, another frequent collaborator with Raimi, voices one of the Souls of the Damned that attack Strange when he possesses a corpse. Co-producer Richie Palmer also voices one of the Souls of the Damned.

== Production ==
=== Development ===
Doctor Strange (2016) co-writer C. Robert Cargill stated in April 2016 that Marvel Studios felt some initial ideas for the film from him and director Scott Derrickson highlighted too much of the "weird stuff" associated with the comic book character Doctor Strange to feature in an origin story, but told the duo to hold onto them for potential future films. Derrickson revealed in October that he had plans for a sequel, expressing his love for the character and the visual possibilities that come with him. Derrickson said the first film was "the tip of an iceberg. There's so much progress that can be made." He wanted to follow the example of the film The Dark Knight (2008) and introduce a villain in the sequel that would allow them to "go deep [and have] a more visceral experience". Star Benedict Cumberbatch had signed on for at least one more Doctor Strange film. Derrickson expressed interest in featuring the villain Nightmare, and further exploring the characters Jonathan Pangborn and Hamir after their small roles in the first film. He explained that he had been "kept in the loop" on how the Avengers films were using Strange due to his close relationships with Joe Russo—the co-director of the Marvel Cinematic Universe (MCU) films Avengers: Infinity War (2018) and Avengers: Endgame (2019)—and Marvel Studios president Kevin Feige. Doctor Strange co-writer Jon Spaihts expressed interest in seeing the character Clea appear in a sequel. In April 2017, Derrickson was reported to be returning for a sequel, beginning work after fulfilling his commitments to the television series Locke & Key (2020–2022).

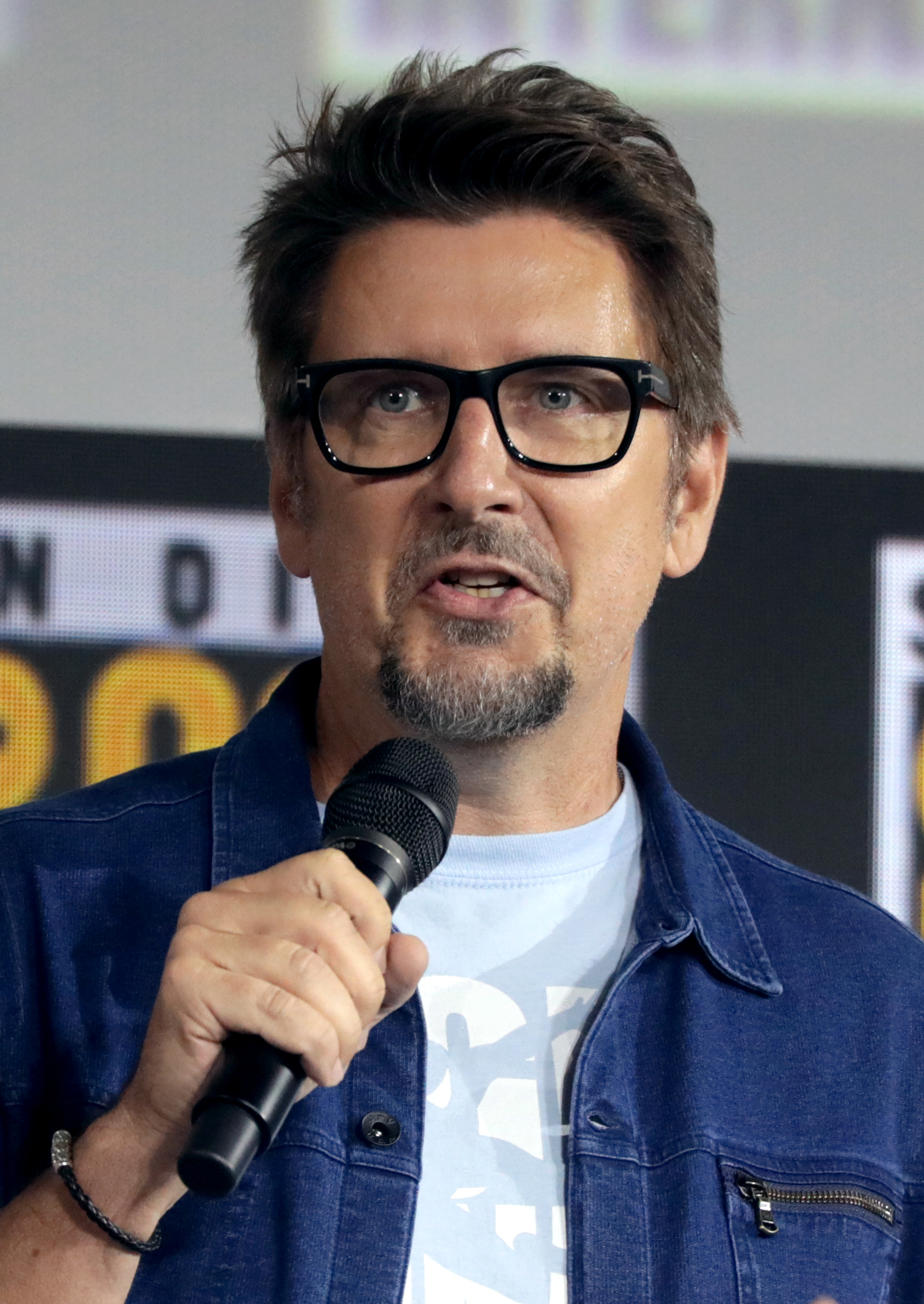
Original director Scott Derrickson announcing the film at the 2019 San Diego Comic-Con

By December 2018, Derrickson had quietly finalized a deal to direct the sequel, with Cumberbatch, Benedict Wong, and Rachel McAdams reprising their respective roles of Dr. Stephen Strange, Wong, and Christine Palmer. Marvel was beginning to search for a writer, with The Hollywood Reporter stating that the script would be written throughout 2019 for a planned filming start in early 2020 and a potential release in May 2021. Feige and Derrickson officially announced the sequel at San Diego Comic-Con in July 2019, revealing the title to be Doctor Strange in the Multiverse of Madness and confirming a release date of May 7, 2021. Derrickson wanted the sequel to be the first scary MCU film and explore more of the gothic and horror elements from the comic books than the first installment did, with co-producer Richie Palmer explaining that the film would use the multiverse to explore "each definition of the word madness" and the idea that "the scariest monsters are the ones that dwell within us". Feige revealed that the Disney+ series WandaVision (2021) would directly set up the film, with Elizabeth Olsen reprising her role of Wanda Maximoff / Scarlet Witch from the series. Additionally, the concept of the multiverse was introduced to the MCU in the first season of Loki (2021), and explored further in the film Spider-Man: No Way Home (2021), which is set before Multiverse of Madness and sees Cumberbatch reprising his role as Strange. After Loki's first-season finale was released, Tom Hiddleston was reported to be reprising his role as Loki in Multiverse of Madness, but ultimately did not appear.

Jade Halley Bartlett, an "up-and-coming screenwriter", was hired to write the sequel's screenplay in October 2019. Barlett said she had developed the film alongside Derrickson, Feige, and other Marvel Studios executives Louis D'Esposito, Eric Hauserman Carroll, and Palmer for around a year, a process she felt was fun and exciting, and called the creative team scholars of the comic books. She was provided with a binder of every Doctor Strange comic book printed for reference to aid her writing. In December, Feige described the multiverse as "the next step in the evolution of the MCU", and said this film would "crack it wide open" in a way that would have repercussions for the Disney+ series and the next films in Marvel Studios' Phase Four slate. Later in the month, he clarified that the sequel would not be a horror film, as some reports had described it following the Comic-Con announcement, but it would be a "big MCU film with scary sequences". Feige compared these sequences to the films Raiders of the Lost Ark (1981), Indiana Jones and the Temple of Doom (1984), Gremlins (1984), and Poltergeist (1982), and said Derrickson was good at being "legitimately scary" due to his background making horror films. Feige also revealed that the film would introduce several surprising new characters to the MCU, including one that Marvel Studios had been looking for a way to use in an MCU film for some time; this was later revealed to be America Chavez, who was included because her powers are related to the multiverse. Chavez's co-creator Joe Casey was not paid for the character's appearance in the film after he rejected a compensation offer from Marvel Comics that he described as a "pittance".

=== Pre-production ===
In January 2020, Marvel Studios and Derrickson announced that he would no longer direct the film due to creative differences. In separate statements, they both said they were thankful for their collaboration so far and Derrickson would remain an executive producer on the film. This was not expected to delay filming, which was set for May 2020. Cargill explained that he and Derrickson conceived a story that went in a different direction from what Marvel wanted, and the pair had not yet written a draft of the screenplay so the final film would not be derivative of their work. Derrickson said leaving the film was a difficult decision, but he did not want to compromise on a film that was different from what he wanted to make. His choice to leave was made easier by the fact that he was able to immediately begin work on The Black Phone (2022), another film he wanted to make. Cumberbatch was not consulted regarding the director change and said he was sad to hear about it, but he respected the decision and how it was handled. Some reports suggested that Derrickson left the film because he wanted to make a "no-holds-barred weird, gnarly, scary movie" similar to A24's films The Witch (2015) or Hereditary (2018), and Marvel Studios did not want to go in that direction, but Feige denied this and said the studio loved that idea. He explained that it was their intention for the film to serve as a guide into a "much creepier side" of the MCU, even after Derrickson's departure, and they wanted to explore the "mind-bending frightening side" of the multiverse.

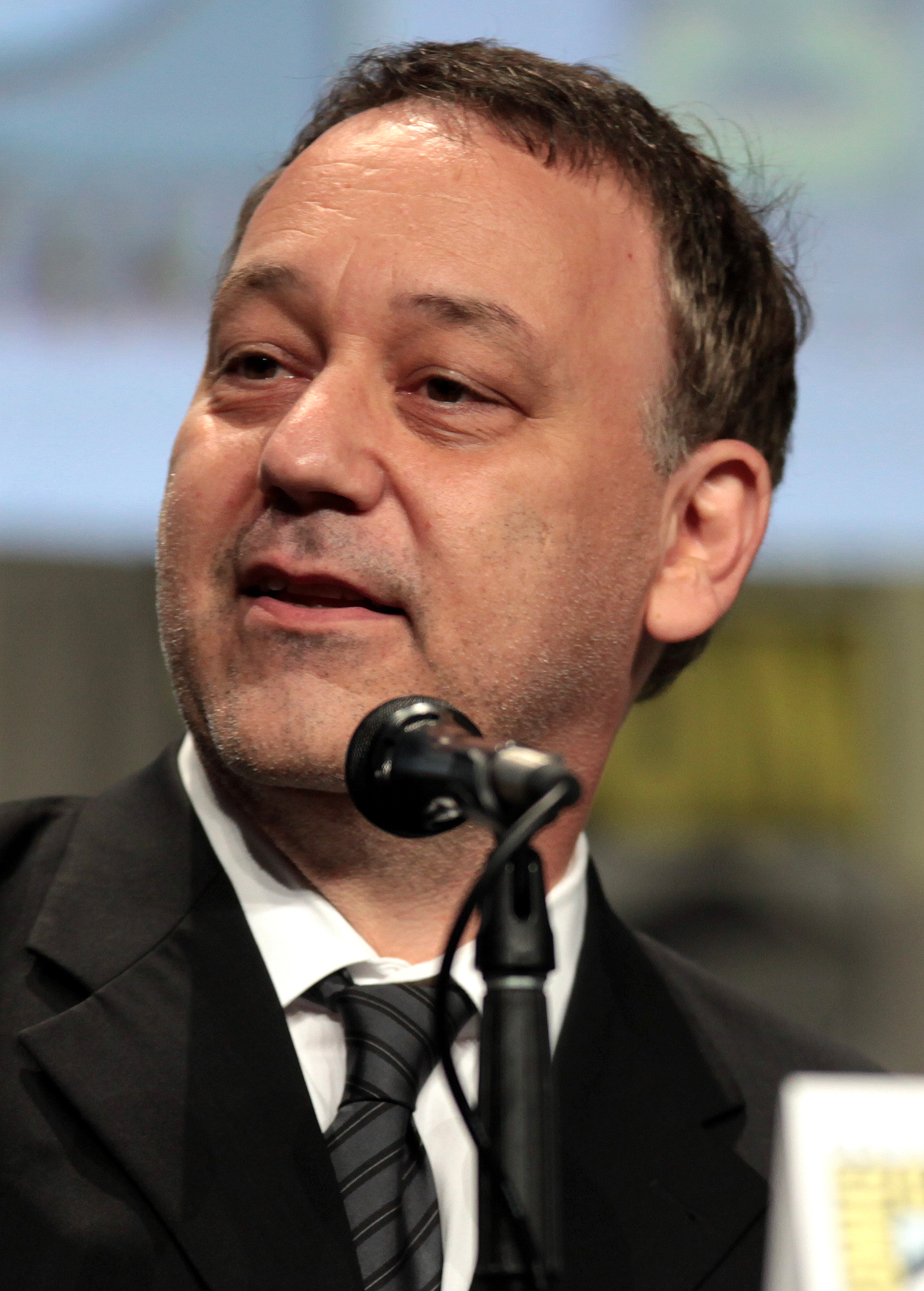
Sam Raimi took over as director during pre-production

Sam Raimi entered negotiations to take over as director by early February. At that time, Chiwetel Ejiofor was expected to reprise his role as Karl Mordo, McAdams was no longer expected to appear, and Michael Waldron was hired to rewrite the film's script after serving as the head writer of Loki's first season. Raimi signed on to direct the film a few weeks later. He had been reluctant to direct another Marvel superhero film after the mixed critical reaction to Spider-Man 3 (2007), feeling that he needed a break from that genre, but he accepted the job because of the challenge of getting the film into production right away and because he was a fan of the Doctor Strange character and Derrickson's work on the first film. Raimi was curious how making big-budgeted films had changed since his prior film, Oz the Great and Powerful (2013), and he also had to familiarize himself with the existing MCU storylines and characters for the film. Waldron had three weeks to write a new script draft based on the work done by Derrickson and Bartlett. He said this was "almost impossible", and Raimi felt "very rushed and panicked" trying to meet the May 2020 production start date. The COVID-19 pandemic began to impact film productions during those first three weeks, and pre-production started taking place remotely. Filming was initially still on track to begin in May 2020, until Disney shifted much of their Phase Four slate of films due to the pandemic, moving Multiverse of Madness's release date to November 5, 2021. Raimi was relieved by this delay, which allowed him and Waldron to start writing the script from scratch in a reasonable time, and make the film their own. Bartlett had written a draft before the COVID-19 pandemic and said that Raimi and Waldron's version was different from the one she developed with Derrickson.

Waldron watched the director's Spider-Man films (2002–2007) so he could identify Raimi's strengths and write toward them. He described Multiverse of Madness as Raimi's return to "big superhero movies", and said it would have every aspect of a Sam Raimi film, including a "slightly scarier direction" which he felt Raimi had a strong track record with. Palmer said Waldron's work introducing the multiverse in Loki allowed Marvel Studios to "jump into telling a good story" without having to re-explain those ideas for the audience, and helped bring "a lot of heart to [the science fiction] concepts". Waldron also used his experience from writing the series Rick and Morty (2013–present), which helped him "introduce these big sci-fi concepts in ways that were digestible, palatable to the audience and without getting them bogged down in the boring details". Rather than just expanding the stakes of the film, Waldron saw the multiverse as the "emotional heart" of the story that could be used in personal ways, such as using "what ifs" and alternate versions of characters to reflect on the film's protagonists, and exploring the characters' right or wrong choices through their alternate versions. Waldron watched Doctor Strange several times, saying he became a "student" of that film, to understand Strange's story in the original. He also looked at how the character had developed through his other MCU appearances, and Raimi praised how Waldron's imagination and knowledge of Marvel history contributed to the script. The creative team saw early production work for the Disney+ animated series What If...? (2021–2024) to learn how Strange was portrayed in that series.

Waldron described Wanda as "the biggest best bullet" that they had, and said she was destined to become a villain in the MCU, as she did in the comics, especially after the end of WandaVision revealed "to her that the family she's built is not real. Then she gets the Darkhold... and learns that there is a real version of her children out there. And if you've got the Book of the Damned whispering in your ear long enough that your kids are out there and you could go get 'em, maybe that can push you to do some terrible things." If she became a villain at the end of the film, he knew another project would get to have the "fun" of using her as a villain. He also wanted to avoid the film getting "overstuffed" by adding a different multiverse-related villain such as Jonathan Majors's Kang the Conqueror, and felt that this would create a "watered-down version of Wanda [who] wouldn't be the protagonist, and she wouldn't really be the antagonist". Olsen was hesitant about playing the villain after believing that she would just be "in an ensemble thing", but she came to feel that the combination of WandaVision and Multiverse of Madness allowed her to create a sympathetic character in the series who the audience would therefore have conflicted feelings about when seeing the film. Waldron worked closely with Olsen and WandaVision head writer Jac Schaeffer to ensure Wanda's story was a satisfying continuation of the series, which Waldron read the scripts for and watched in its entirety while writing the script. He wanted to mirror Wanda's struggles with control following the events of that series with Strange's own need for control following Infinity War and Endgame. Raimi also studied the series despite not fully seeing it, particularly key moments that directly impacted their plans for the film, to make sure the film maintained "a proper through line and character-growth dynamic" for her character. It was important to Olsen that the film not repeat what was done in WandaVision and instead be an evolution of the character, and she requested several adjustments to the script to avoid moments that she found too similar to the series. To justify the many killings that Wanda commits in the film, Olsen focused on the character's perspective of those people being in her way and not listening to her after the loss of her children in the series.

After a planned appearance by Cumberbatch in WandaVision was removed late in the development of the series, rewrites to the Multiverse of Madness script were required which Feige described as a "wonderful combination of very dedicated coordination, and chaos". These changes include how Strange and Wanda meet in the film. The story of Multiverse of Madness is still set up by WandaVision, but the film was developed to also work for viewers who did not watch the series. For consistency with the Darkhold's appearance, the film's props department designed the prop that was used for WandaVision and then reused it for the film. While writing his first draft, Waldron felt the film needed to "get drunk [and] find the madness in the multiverse" by introducing alternate universe versions of known Marvel characters. This led to the introduction of the Illuminati, a secret society from the comics. Waldron had been watching the film Aliens (1986) as inspiration for the script's thriller tone, and enjoyed how the "badass" space marines "just get slaughtered" by the titular aliens to set the latter up as scarier villains for the rest of that film. He wanted to do something similar with Wanda by introducing the Illuminati as a group of characters that fans would be excited to see and then have Wanda kill them all. The idea of Strange taking control of a dead body for the end of the film came from Waldron and Palmer discussing how he would be able to confront Wanda from a different universe, with the corpse of another version of Strange having been already established at the start of the film. Raimi, Feige, and Cumberbatch were all excited about the idea, despite Raimi initially wanting to avoid a zombie sequence to not repeat what he had done previously with zombie films.

The film's release was shifted again at the end of April 2020, this time to March 25, 2022, after Sony Pictures rescheduled No Way Home to the November 2021 date. Until then, Waldron had been writing the script expecting Multiverse of Madness to be released before No Way Home. He was in contact with No Way Home writers Chris McKenna and Erik Sommers throughout the writing process, and after the release date change they adjusted their respective scripts so instead of Multiverse of Madness "blowing the lid on the multiverse" it would pick up after No Way Home with Strange already having multiverse experience. This change had a "knock-down effect" on the rest of the script. There had been early plans to include Strange's new costume from Multiverse of Madness and America Chavez in No Way Home, while a brief cameo of Peter Parker / Spider-Man was planned for Multiverse of Madness, but the pandemic ultimately prevented those plans from coming to fruition. Raimi noted that where No Way Home saw characters from other universes enter the MCU, Multiverse of Madness features characters from the MCU entering the multiverse and exploring different universes. Ejiofor confirmed his involvement in June, and Xochitl Gomez joined the cast in October. Cumberbatch revealed that month that filming would start in London by the beginning of November, with the production not impacted by a national lockdown in England that was set for November 5 to December 2 due to increased COVID-19 cases.

=== Filming ===
Principal photography began in November 2020 in London, under the working title Stellar Vortex. Filming was delayed from an initial May 2020 start date due to the COVID-19 pandemic. Olsen began filming her scenes by November 25, shooting back-to-back with WandaVision, and found it odd to transition from the series back to starring in an MCU film. At the beginning of December, filming was taking place at Longcross Studios in Longcross, Surrey, where several New York City blocks and sets for the Sanctum Sanctorum were built by production designer Charlie Wood. McAdams soon signed on to return as Palmer, shortly before Feige officially confirmed her involvement on December 10 along with that of Ejiofor, Wong, and Gomez. He also revealed that Gomez would portray America Chavez. Cumberbatch had begun filming his scenes by then, after completing his work on No Way Home. He said the film was more collaborative than his previous MCU appearances, for which he felt like he was "just along for the ride".

Many of the actors, including Olsen, Cumberbatch, and Wong, were excited to be working with Raimi. The director said many "dimensionalized visuals" were used during shooting to tell the film's story, as he was able to use his preferred camera techniques such as using the camera and perspective to create a feeling of anxiety for audiences. John Mathieson served as cinematographer, and shot the film with Panavision DXL2 IMAX-certified cameras. Raimi encouraged improvisation, explaining that the cast could adapt their interactions due to their knowledge of their own characters and that the script often changed shortly before filming for those scenes began. The ending of the film was still "up in the air" when filming began, and Cumberbatch said it took some time for the team to decide on one that tied together all of the characters' stories. Waldron explained that they felt the ending was too happy following all the "bad shit" that occurs in the film and wanted to show that Strange would suffer consequences for his actions—including possessing the corpse of a different version of himself—which tied into Mordo's warning from the first film: "The bill comes due." This led to them adding the ending scene where Strange develops a third eye in his forehead, and Waldron felt this was the sort of twist that horror films often end on. Elaborating on that tone, Olsen said they were going for a "horror show vibe", comparing it to Raimi's Evil Dead films with aspects of the horror genre such as "constant fear". She felt it was "more than a glossy Indiana Jones movie" and would be darker than those films, with Raimi trying to make "the scariest Marvel movie" and create "as much tension for the audience" as possible.

Olsen shot for three weeks before pandemic restrictions increased near the end of December due to a surge of COVID-19 cases in the United Kingdom, with another lockdown in England announced from January 6, 2021. The scenes of Scarlet Witch massacring the Illuminati were shot at the British Museum of London, with Marvel using CGI to add a new room with a glass entrance and a few statues for the background. Filming resumed in early 2021, and at some point, Cumberbatch had to temporarily pause filming after being in close contact with a member of the production who had a false positive test. In mid-March, Cumberbatch said they were in the middle of production, and Ejiofor had begun filming his scenes in London by then. Filming occurred at Broomfield Hill Car Park in Richmond Park for the week of March 25. Shooting took place at Freemasons' Hall, London, for a few weeks in April. On April 15, Feige said they were in the final week of filming, with shooting taking place from that day until April 17 at Burrow Hill Cider Farm in Somerset. Jett Klyne and Julian Hilliard, who respectively portrayed Wanda's sons Tommy and Billy in WandaVision, were reportedly on set at the farm, and were confirmed to be in the film in April 2022.

=== Post-production ===
Bob Murawski and Tia Nolan co-edited the film. Some additional photography had been completed by mid-September 2021, with Olsen and Wong completing their work. The film was once again delayed in October, this time to May 6, 2022. Later that month, Cumberbatch said they were in the middle of more additional photography, with further reshoots set for November and December, over at least six weeks in Los Angeles. The Hollywood Reporter said this photography was "significant" and included two weeks dedicated to filming that could not be completed during principal photography because of actor availability issues and COVID-related slowdowns. Cumberbatch confirmed the reshoots were being used to make adjustments to already shot material, while also filming parts that "were just impossible to do [during principal photography] because of logistics, COVID etc". The Hollywood Reporter later reported that the reshoots would allow the film to have "more fun with the multiverse" by adding more cameo appearances and variants of established characters, similar to No Way Home and the first season of Loki. Waldron created a fourth multiverse world for the film to shoot during the reshoots, which ultimately did not appear in the film. The film's teaser trailer was released in late December and confirmed the involvement of Michael Stuhlbarg as Nicodemus West, reprising his role from Doctor Strange. It also revealed that Cumberbatch would portray multiple versions of Strange in the film. The reshoots reportedly wrapped during the week of December 13, but additional filming continued in early January 2022. The latter was completed on January 8. By the end of the month, Raimi had assembled a cut of the film that would be presented to test audiences, and said there was potential for more reshoots to occur if the test screenings found that clarification or improvement were needed; Cumberbatch was working on further reshoots in the United Kingdom by March 13.

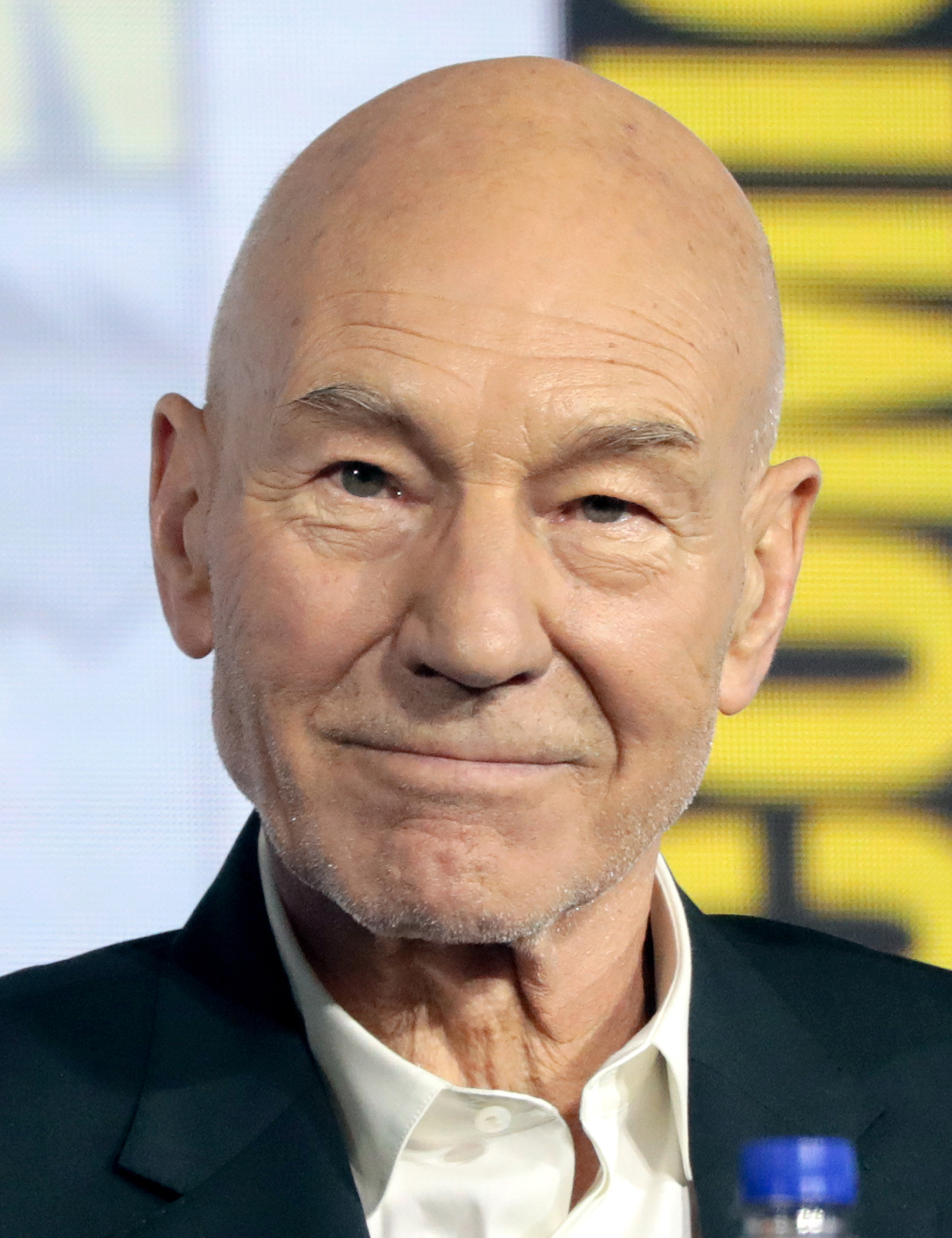
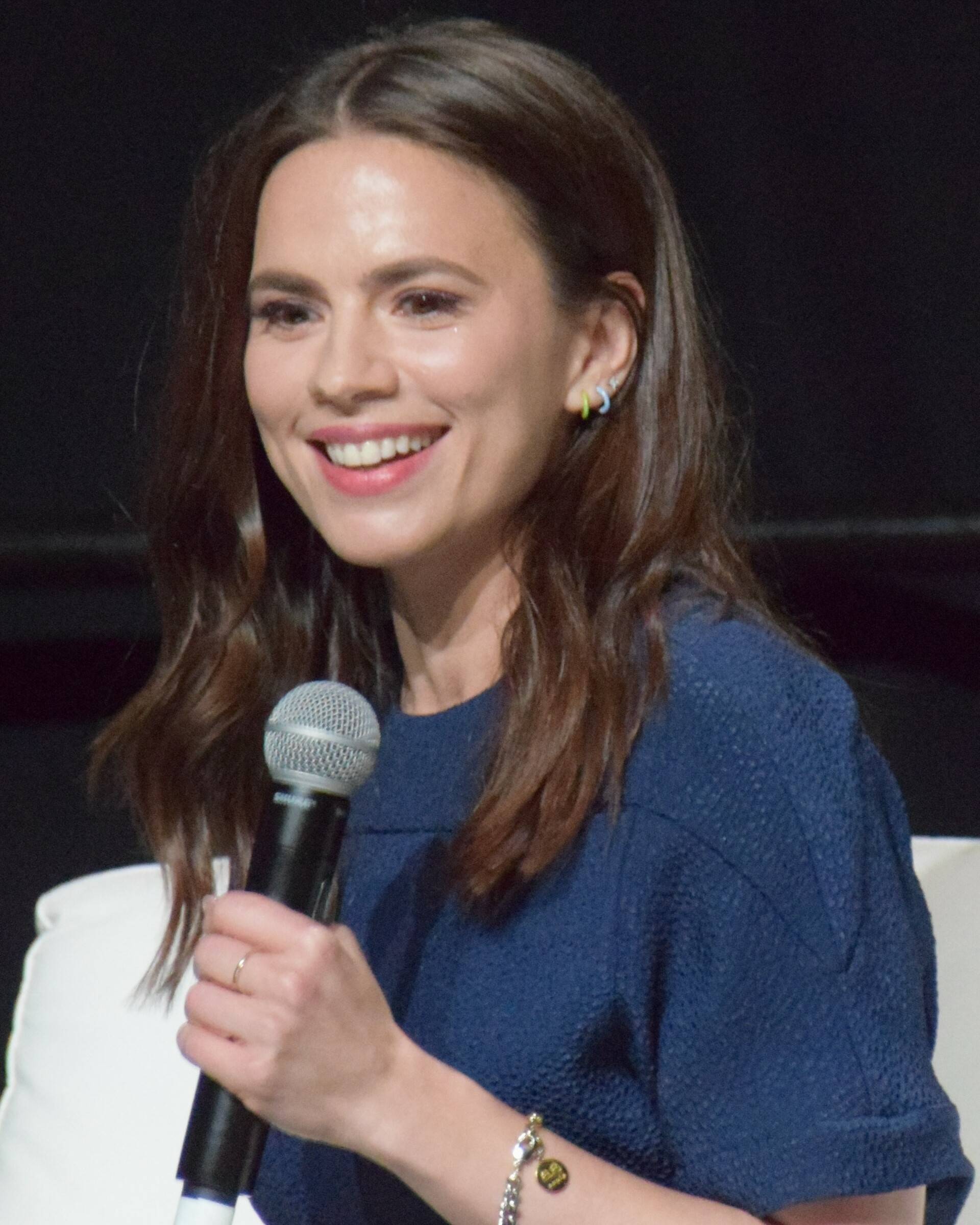
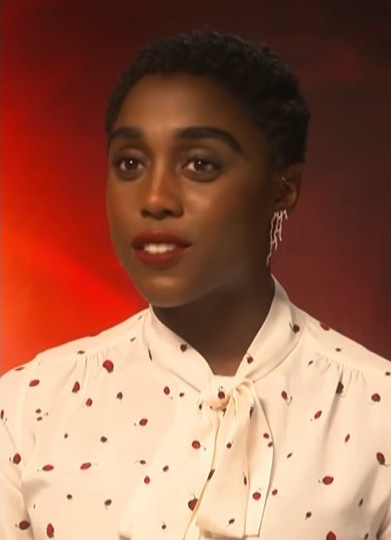
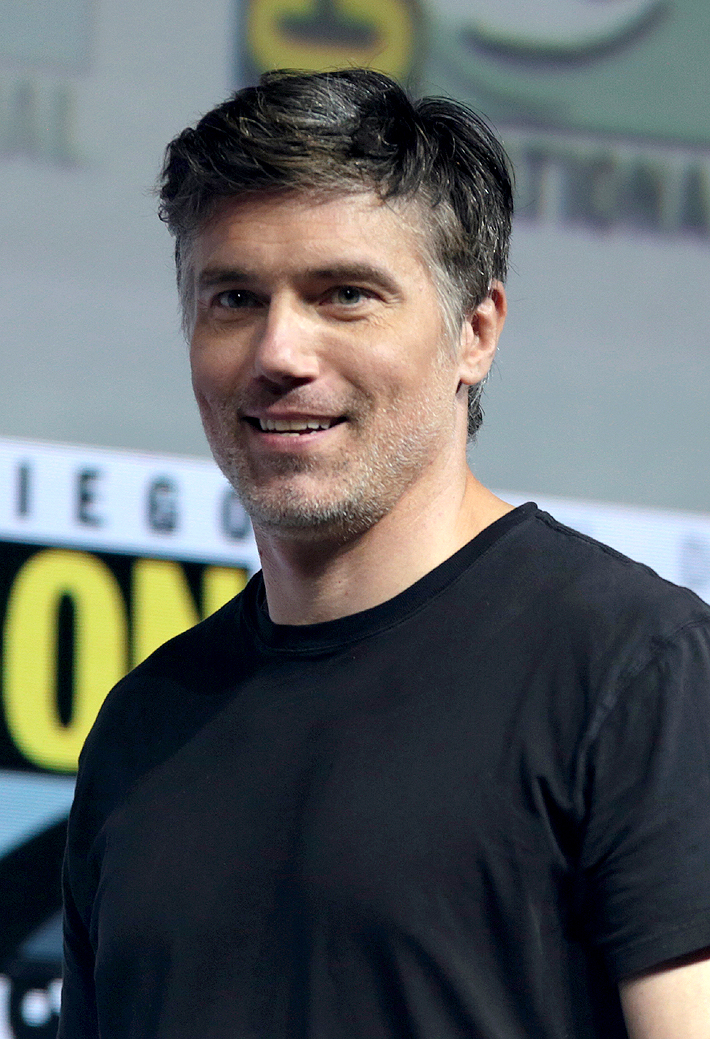
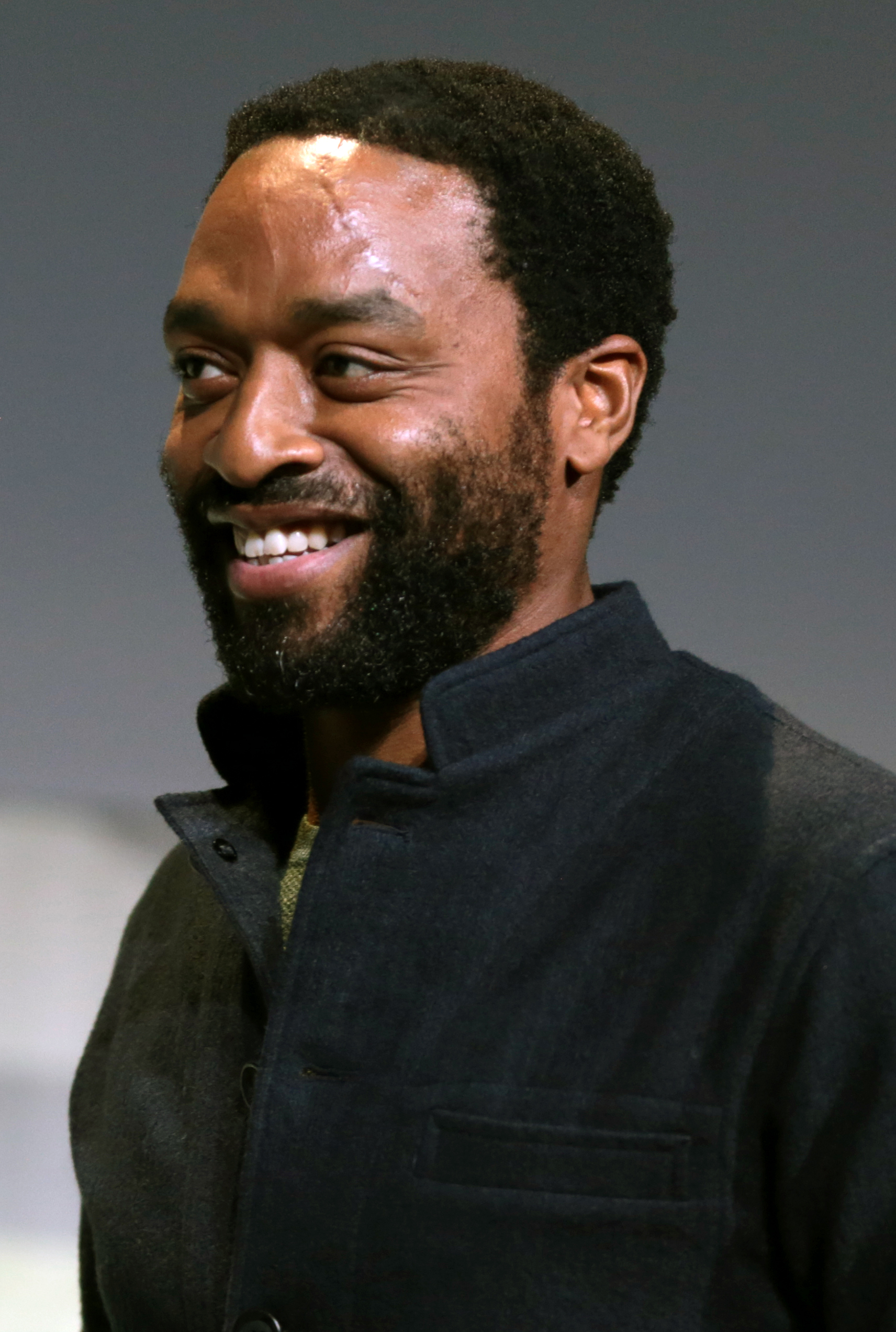
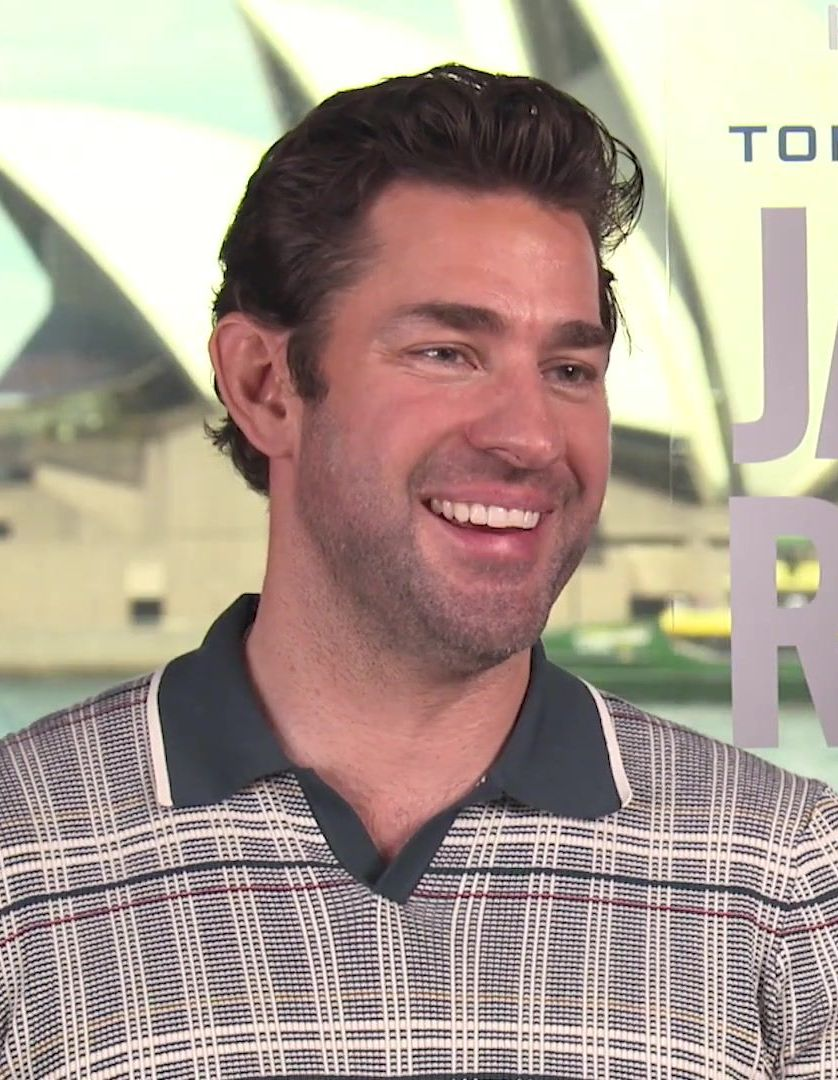
Actors reprising their roles from earlier Marvel media as members of the Illuminati include Patrick Stewart as Charles Xavier, Hayley Atwell as Captain Carter, Lashana Lynch as Maria Rambeau, Anson Mount as Black Bolt, and Chiwetel Ejiofor as Karl Mordo. John Krasinski appears as Reed Richards, after having been a popular suggestion for the role.

Patrick Stewart, who portrayed Charles Xavier / Professor X in 20th Century Fox's X-Men film series, was revealed to be appearing in the film in an undisclosed role with the release of the full trailer in February 2022; Stewart was believed to be reprising the role of Xavier, which had previously been the subject of speculation. A poster for the film, released at the same time, additionally teased the inclusion of Peggy Carter / Captain Carter, a character who was introduced in What If...?. Stewart initially denied that he was in the film, but soon admitted that he was. The trailer also revealed that Topo Wresniwiro would reprise his role of Hamir from Doctor Strange. A creature resembling prominent Doctor Strange villain Shuma-Gorath appears in the film, but it is given the name Gargantos, which comes from a different comic book character, because the rights to the name Shuma-Gorath belong to Heroic Signatures. Gargantos' eye was modeled after that of Olsen's to foreshadow her role as the film's antagonist. The cosmic entity the Living Tribunal also makes a brief appearance. Discussing Stewart's involvement, as well as assumptions based on the trailer that the Illuminati would be appearing in the film, Palmer said returning actors would not necessarily be portraying characters that had been seen before, and if Marvel Studios were to introduce the Illuminati they would do a "more MCU-driven" version of the group.

The Illuminati's appearance was officially confirmed in March; and the team features actors portraying new versions of their characters from previous projects: Stewart plays a new version of Xavier that combines elements from his previous performances, including a line of dialogue from the film X-Men: Days of Future Past (2014), with elements from X-Men: The Animated Series (1992–1997); Ejiofor plays a new version of Mordo; Hayley Atwell portrays Captain Carter after voicing the What If...? version; Lashana Lynch plays a different version of Maria Rambeau / Captain Marvel from the one she portrayed in the MCU film Captain Marvel (2019); and Anson Mount portrays an alternate version of Blackagar Boltagon / Black Bolt from his role in Marvel's ABC television series Inhumans (2017). Also in the group is John Krasinski as Fantastic Four member Reed Richards. Krasinski had been a popular suggestion for the role by fans for some time, especially since the announcement of a new Fantastic Four film set in the MCU. Mount was unexpectedly called by Feige and reached out by Raimi to reprise his role as Black Bolt, which he was grateful and honored to do due to his joy at working with the latter. When Lynch was approached to return, she assumed she would be playing an ancestor of Rambeau and was surprised to learn she would be an alternate version of Captain Marvel. Atwell was disappointed by her role in the film, and felt Carter's death was a "complete disservice" to the character. She had tried to suggest changes while on set which were dismissed. The Illuminati sequence was filmed in pieces, with many of the actors not being on set together. Krasinski's footage was filmed during reshoots to replace a planned cameo appearance by Daniel Craig, who chose not to film the role because he did not believe a single day of filming was worth the risk of catching COVID-19 and spreading it to his family. Craig was reportedly set to portray the character Balder the Brave in the scene. Olsen did not meet Krasinski while shooting the scene in which Scarlet Witch kills Richards, and she instead filmed the scene with a stand-in. Mount filmed his scenes during reshoots while Stewart filmed his scenes as Jean-Luc Picard for the Paramount+ series Star Trek: Picard (2020–2023), without the presence of Ejiofor and before Krasinski's contract was signed, with other actors filling for the roles, substituting their shots and transplanting faces. Due to safety protocols to prevent the spread of COVID-19, Stewart and other leading actors filmed their scenes in isolation without other actors present, which he found to be frustrating and disappointing.

Waldron said the final line-up of the Illuminati was similar to the one in his first draft, but with some other suggestions coming from Feige. Waldron considered including Namor, a member of the Illuminati in the comics, but Marvel Studios did not allow the character to appear in any MCU projects at Ryan Coogler's request before the film Black Panther: Wakanda Forever (2022), in which he was played by Tenoch Huerta Mejía; Waldron's first draft also included an Earth-838 counterpart of Evangeline Lilly's Hope van Dyne / Wasp as a member of the Illuminati, who would have been killed by Wanda clapping her hands to kill her. Storyboards by artist Soren Bendt for the Illuminati massacre scene suggest that, in addition to Balder the Brave, an Earth-838 counterpart of Obadiah Stane / Iron Monger, who was previously portrayed by Jeff Bridges in the first MCU film Iron Man (2008), was also considered for the group's lineup. There were also rumors that Tom Cruise would be portraying an alternate version of Tony Stark / Iron Man known as Superior Iron Man in the film after being in contention for the role back in the 1990s before Robert Downey Jr. was cast as the title character in 2006. Waldron expressed interest in the idea, but Cruise was never approached due to his filming schedule for the films Mission: Impossible – Dead Reckoning Part One (2023) and Mission: Impossible – The Final Reckoning (2025). Other rumors about potential cameos included an appearance of Ryan Reynolds reprising his role as Wade Wilson / Deadpool from the Fox films Deadpool (2016) and Deadpool 2 (2018); Waldron confirmed there had been discussions about bringing Reynolds in to play Deadpool before they decided that the film was not "the right place" to feature him. Another character introduced in the film is Clea, with Charlize Theron cast in the role. Waldron said they wanted to include her in the film but felt they needed to resolve Strange's relationship with Christine Palmer first, so the character's introduction was saved for the mid-credits scene to set her up as a potential new love interest in a future story.

External videos
- Marvel Studios' Doctor Strange in the Multiverse of Madness End Credits Main On End Title Sequence presents the film's main-on-end title sequence, YouTube video from Perception's channel

Industrial Light & Magic (ILM), Digital Domain, Framestore, Luma Pictures, Capital T, Sony Pictures Imageworks, Wētā FX, Trixter, Crafty Apes, and Perception worked on the visual effects of the film, in which an estimated 2,000 VFX shots were created. Framestore worked on the multiverse jumping sequence with Strange and Chavez, while Luma Pictures worked on the Gargantos fight scene. Perception also designed the film's main-on-end title sequence, which employs colorful Rorschach test visuals because Raimi wanted the sequence to "both complement and contrast the film". Animators from Disney worked to create another version of the Walt Disney Productions film Snow White and the Seven Dwarfs (1937), with a different color palette, for a scene in Multiverse of Madness. Graham Churchyard served as costume designer and created most of the costumes for the film, except for those worn by Black Bolt and Richards, both of which could not be completed in time due to travel restrictions caused by the COVID-19 pandemic. They were created through visual effects instead. In late August 2022, Waldron revealed that one of the first drafts of the film's script included a post-credits scene involving a seemingly alive Richards, but the idea was scrapped. Another draft of the script included a scene of Strange meeting a variant of himself named Melvin, who would have been depicted as a street magician with no mystical abilities. Gomez noted that Marvel asked for numerous rewrites of the script from Waldron.

== Music ==
Doctor Strange composer Michael Giacchino was set to return for the sequel by October 2019, when Derrickson was set as director. After Raimi took over, Danny Elfman was hired as composer; Elfman previously worked with Raimi on the films Darkman (1990), A Simple Plan (1998), Spider-Man (2002), Spider-Man 2 (2004), and Oz the Great and Powerful (2013). By February 2021, Elfman had begun working on music to be used during filming, but did not begin work on the actual score for several months. In January 2022, Elfman said he was completing work on the score, including conducting an orchestra at Abbey Road Studios in London. Elfman's frequent collaborator Steve Bartek worked on the score remotely over Zoom. A soundtrack album featuring Elfman's score was released digitally by Hollywood Records and Marvel Music on May 4, with three "spoiler tracks" that were excluded from the initial release being made available on May 20.

Elfman referenced Giacchino's Doctor Strange theme in a similar way to how he used Alan Silvestri's theme from the MCU film The Avengers (2012) when working on its sequel Avengers: Age of Ultron (2015). The score also features the song "WandaVision!" by Kristen Anderson-Lopez and Robert Lopez, from the WandaVision episode "Don't Touch That Dial", when Wanda is first introduced; Silvestri's "Captain America March" theme from the MCU film Captain America: The First Avenger (2011) for Atwell's Captain Carter appearance; and the main theme from the animated series X-Men '97 (2024–present) by the Newton Brothers, which is an updated version of the main theme from X-Men: The Animated Series composed by Ron Wasserman, for the introduction of Xavier. For legal reasons, the latter theme is credited to The Animated Series music executives Haim Saban and Shuki Levy.

== Marketing ==
A teaser trailer for the film was played after the end credits of Spider-Man: No Way Home, before being released online on December 22, 2021. Matt Webb Mitovich of TVLine called it a "rousing, thrilling trailer" and noted the ending that revealed an alternate version of Strange. He believed this was Doctor Strange Supreme, an alternate version of the character introduced in What If...?. Inverse's Alex Welch felt it was a "suitably psychedelic teaser, full of revelations and fun moments that should leave Marvel fans gobsmacked", and suggested the film would tie together "many of the multiversal threads left hanging" from No Way Home, WandaVision, and the first seasons of Loki and What If...?. Writing for Decider, Alex Zalben believed the film was a "direct result" of What If...?, which "instantly mak[es] the animated series far more important than Marvel fans might have originally realized". James Grebey at Syfy Wire said there was "a very ominous aura to the whole trailer". Daniel Chin of The Ringer felt the trailer had "creepy imagery" and that it was "expected to separate itself from other Marvel projects even further by weaving in horror elements", while also noting how the film won't have to introduce the multiverse, and can instead explore it even further, and also how it'll be the "first real attempt to blend existing story lines from its Disney+ series with its big-screen properties", while he thought made it the "first major crossover event in Phase 4". Also in December, merchandise began to be made available with the reveal of Marvel Legends figures based on the film.

A teaser aired during Super Bowl LVI on February 13, 2022, with the full-length trailer debuting online afterward. Justin Carter at Gizmodo highlighted how the trailer continued the first film's "visually trippy" approach to alternate dimensions while adding more horror elements, and was also excited by the brief appearance of America Chavez, while his colleague Germain Lussier felt, compared to the teaser, the trailer "raised the stakes exponentially with all manner of wild revelations and images". Entertainment Weekly's Devan Coggan also felt the trailer was "trippy" and added that it "seems to have more in common with Raimi's iconic horror films". The Verge's Charles Pulliam-Moore said the trailer did a better job conveying the film's plot than the teaser, and he felt the film would be the "culmination of all the big-picture troubles" teased in WandaVision and Loki. Many commentators noted the revelation of Patrick Stewart's involvement in the trailer and the implication he could reprise his X-Men role of Charles Xavier / Professor X, which led to speculation that Multiverse of Madness would introduce the MCU version of the Illuminati. RelishMix reported that the trailer had 93.12 million views in 24 hours across Facebook, Twitter, YouTube, and Instagram, which was the top trailer among those airing during the Super Bowl according to their metrics. Disney reported 143 million online views across Twitter, Facebook, Instagram, YouTube, TikTok, Snapchat, and Google searches, and 55 million broadcast views.

Funko Pops based on the film were revealed in March 2022. In April, Procter & Gamble released a commercial promoting the film and Tide laundry detergent featuring Wong and the Cloak of Levitation. Later that month, Disney showcased the opening sequence of the film at CinemaCon. The film also partnered with G Fuel and Xbox, which created custom cobranded console kits and controllers inspired by the film, while also featuring a Jaeger-Le Coultre watch in the film. It also partnered with Mori Building Company, a Japanese urban landscape developer, which turned its café and menu into an interactive photo op experience to promote the film. Additional partnerships included Cadillac, Maybank, Shell US in the Asia–Pacific (APAC) region, and also Xiaomi and T-Mobile in the Europe, the Middle East and Africa (EMEA) region. Three episodes of the series Marvel Studios: Legends were released on April 29, exploring Doctor Strange, Wong, and Scarlet Witch using footage from their previous MCU appearances. Eight VTubers from Hololive Production promoted the film in a special pre-premiere stream event on YouTube on May 3. Disney spent a total of $150 million promoting the film.

== Release ==
=== Theatrical ===
Doctor Strange in the Multiverse of Madness held its world premiere at the Dolby Theatre in Hollywood, Los Angeles, on May 2, 2022. The film was released in several countries, including Germany, Italy, Sweden, and South Korea on May 4, 2022, in the United Kingdom on May 5, and in the United States on May 6. It was released in 4DX, RealD 3D, IMAX, Dolby Cinema, ScreenX, and Superscreen formats. It was originally set for release on May 7, 2021, but was pushed back to November 5, 2021, due to the COVID-19 pandemic, before it was further shifted to March 25, 2022, after Sony rescheduled Spider-Man: No Way Home to November 2021. In October 2021, it was shifted once again to its final May 2022 date. The film is part of Phase Four of the MCU.

In April 2022, The Hollywood Reporter confirmed that the film would not be released in Saudi Arabia due to the inclusion of America Chavez, a gay character, given the region's censorship of LGBTQ references. Nawaf Alsabhan, Saudi Arabia's general supervisor of cinema classification, said the film had not been banned from the country but revealed that Disney was "not willing" to grant their request of cutting "barely 12 seconds" of a scene in which Chavez refers to her "two moms". The film had been set to release in several Persian Gulf countries on May 5, before advanced tickets were removed from cinema websites in Saudi Arabia, Kuwait, and Qatar. Tickets were still available in the United Arab Emirates, which The Hollywood Reporter stated was an indication that the film could still be released there. IMAX Corporation also confirmed that the film would not be released in Egypt. Cumberbatch was disappointed by the countries' decisions to not release the film, saying: "We've come to know from those repressive regimes that their lack of tolerance is exclusionary to people who deserve to be not only included, but celebrated for who they are and made to feel part of a society and a culture and not punished for their sexuality. It feels truly out of step with everything that we've experienced as a species, let alone where we're at globally more as a culture, but frankly, it's just even more reason why this isn't tokenism to include an LGBTQ+ community member". Deadline Hollywood reported in late April that the film was unlikely to be released in China after a newspaper box for The Epoch Times, a newspaper that opposes the Chinese Communist Party (CCP), was noticed in the film's trailer. It had been submitted for review to Chinese officials by that time. In mid-May, Disney CEO Bob Chapek said the situation was complicated but noted that the film was already commercially successful without a release in China.

=== Home media ===
The film began streaming on Disney+ on June 22, 2022, with the option to view the theatrical version of the film or an IMAX Enhanced version. It was released by Walt Disney Studios Home Entertainment on Ultra HD Blu-ray, Blu-ray, and DVD on July 26. The home media includes audio commentary, deleted scenes, a gag reel, and various behind-the-scenes featurettes. According to Samba TV, Doctor Strange in the Multiverse of Madness was watched by 2.1 million U.S. households within its first five days of being available on Disney+; this was comparable to the viewership of Shang-Chi and the Legend of the Ten Rings (2021) and Eternals (2021). According to the streaming aggregator JustWatch, Doctor Strange in the Multiverse of Madness was the sixth most streamed film in the United States in 2022.

== Reception ==
=== Box office ===
Doctor Strange in the Multiverse of Madness grossed $411.3 million in the United States and Canada and $544.4 million in other territories, for a worldwide total of $955.8 million. It was the fourth-highest-grossing film of 2022. Forbes estimated the film made a profit of $127.3 million. The film grossed $42 million in ticket presales through Fandango, and sold the most tickets on the platform since Spider-Man: No Way Home (2021), while also surpassing ticket presales for The Batman (2022) within 24 hours. Its worldwide opening weekend of $452.4 million was the ninth-largest opening ever, and marked the highest May debut of all-time for IMAX ($33 million).

In the United States and Canada, the film grossed $187.4 million in its opening weekend, surpassing the $151 million opening weekend gross of Spider-Man 3 (2007) to become the highest of Sam Raimi's career. It grossed $90.7 million on its opening day, which included $36 million from Thursday previews. The preview was the second-best preview during the pandemic behind Spider-Man: No Way Home and the overall eighth-largest preview performance, while the opening-day gross was the seventh-highest in industry history. The film's $90.7 million opening day tally is also the largest single-day gross in May of all time. In its second weekend, the film grossed $61 million, becoming one of the MCU's biggest second-weekend box office drops. The 67% decline was attributed by Deadline Hollywood to the "bad word of mouth" on the film and its CinemaScore grade, while EntTelligence saw more than 17% downsize of available seats for the film, resulting in fewer showtimes which also led to the decline. In its third weekend, the film grossed $31.6 million. The film grossed $17 million in its fourth weekend for a running total of $376.1 million, passing The Batman's $369.3 million to become the highest-grossing film of 2022 (later surpassed by Top Gun: Maverick). It ended up being the fourth highest-grossing film of 2022 in this region.

Outside the United States and Canada, Multiverse of Madness grossed $265 million from 49 markets within its opening weekend, landing at number one in numerous markets. The film grossed $27.2 million from 20 markets on its opening day, surpassing the first-day overall results of Doctor Strange (2016) by 153% and The Batman by 210%, but falling behind No Way Home by 4%. The film had the highest opening day gross for a film released during the COVID-19 pandemic in the Philippines and Thailand, with $1.2 million in both markets, and the second-best ditto in France ($3 million), Italy ($2.2 million), and Germany ($1.8 million). In Malaysia, the film grossed $1.6 million on its opening day to become the second highest in the country's history. The film grossed $10.3 million from its previews in Latin America, including from Mexico ($3.5 million) and Brazil ($2.7 million). As of June 12, 2022, the film's largest markets are the United Kingdom ($51.4 million), South Korea ($49.2 million), Mexico ($40.6 million), Brazil ($33.1 million), and France ($27.7 million).

=== Critical response ===
The review aggregator website Rotten Tomatoes reported an approval rating of 73%, with an average score of 6.5/10, based on 464 reviews. The website's critical consensus reads, "Doctor Strange in the Multiverse of Madness labors under the weight of the sprawling MCU, but Sam Raimi's distinctive direction casts an entertaining spell." On Metacritic, the film has a weighted average score of 60 out of 100, based on 65 critics, indicating "mixed or average" reviews. Audiences polled by CinemaScore gave the film an average grade of "B+" on an A+ to F scale, while PostTrak reported 82% of audience members gave it a positive score, with 69% saying they would definitely recommend it.

Critics had varied opinions on the film, though many praised Sam Raimi's direction for its distinctive style. Don Kaye of Den of Geek and Owen Gleiberman of Variety both noted Raimi's touch, with Kaye appreciating the comic book weirdness and Gleiberman acknowledging the excessive CGI but enjoying Raimi's flair. Similarly, Leah Greenblatt of Entertainment Weekly found Raimi's direction "wildly refreshing", and Pete Hammond of Deadline Hollywood likened the film's storytelling to Raimi's earlier horror works, such as The Evil Dead. David Ehrlich of IndieWire felt that Doctor Strange's character had been diluted and offered a mixed view on Raimi's impact, while Brian Tallerico of RogerEbert.com criticized the film's characterization and excessive reliance on CGI, labeling it a "Frankenstein movie". Similarly, Alonso Duralde of TheWrap compared the film unfavorably to Everything Everywhere All at Once (2022), criticizing the writing and lack of character development, though he did appreciate the score and visuals. Overall, while Doctor Strange in the Multiverse of Madness received praise for its unique direction under Raimi and strong performances, particularly from Elizabeth Olsen, the film's heavy reliance on CGI, its plot complexities, and issues with character development left some critics divided.

=== Accolades ===
Accolades received by Doctor Strange in the Multiverse of Madness
Award	Date of ceremony	Category	Recipient(s)	Result	Ref.
Critics' Choice Super Awards	March 16, 2023	Best Superhero Movie	Doctor Strange in the Multiverse of Madness	Nominated	
Critics' Choice Super Awards	March 16, 2023	Best Actor in a Superhero Movie	Benedict Cumberbatch	Nominated	
Critics' Choice Super Awards	March 16, 2023	Best Actress in a Superhero Movie	Elizabeth Olsen	Nominated	
Critics' Choice Super Awards	March 16, 2023	Best Villain in a Movie	Elizabeth Olsen	Nominated	
Dragon Awards	September 4, 2022	Best Science Fiction or Fantasy Movie	Doctor Strange in the Multiverse of Madness	Nominated	
Florida Film Critics Circle Awards	December 22, 2022	Best Visual Effects	Doctor Strange in the Multiverse of Madness	Nominated	
Golden Trailer Awards	October 6, 2022	Best Fantasy Adventure	"Nightmare" (Wild Card)	Nominated	
Golden Trailer Awards	October 6, 2022	Best Summer 2022 Blockbuster Trailer	"Nightmare" (Wild Card)	Nominated	
Golden Trailer Awards	October 6, 2022	Best Summer 2022 Blockbuster TV Spot	"Ready" (Wild Card)	Won	
Golden Trailer Awards	June 29, 2023	Best Digital – Fantasy Adventure	"Open Says Me" (Tiny Hero)	Nominated	
Grammy Awards	February 5, 2023	Best Arrangement, Instrumental or A Cappella	Danny Elfman (for the song "Main Titles")	Nominated	
Hollywood Music in Media Awards	November 16, 2022	Best Original Score in a Sci-Fi/Fantasy Film	Danny Elfman	Won	
Hollywood Music in Media Awards	November 16, 2022	Best Music Supervision – Film	Dave Jordan	Nominated	
Hollywood Professional Association Awards	November 17, 2022	Outstanding Visual Effects – Feature Film	Julian Foddy, Jan Maroske, Koen Hofmeester, Sally Wilson, and John Seru (Industrial Light & Magic)	Won (Note: Tied with Scott Kersavage, Erin V. Ramos, David E. Fluhr, and Paul McGrath for Encanto (2021))	
Hollywood Professional Association Awards	November 17, 2022	Outstanding Visual Effects – Feature Film	Joel Behrens, Alexandre Millet, Kazuki Takahashi, Juan Pablo Allgeier, and Bryan Smeall (Digital Domain)	Nominated	
International Film Music Critics Association Awards	February 23, 2023	Best Original Score for a Fantasy/Science Fiction/Horror Film	Danny Elfman	Nominated	
Lumiere Awards	February 10, 2023	Best 2D to 3D Conversion	Doctor Strange in the Multiverse of Madness	Won	
MTV Movie & TV Awards	May 7, 2023	Best Villain	Elizabeth Olsen	Won	
Nickelodeon Kids' Choice Awards	March 4, 2023	Favorite Movie Actress	Elizabeth Olsen	Nominated	
People's Choice Awards	December 6, 2022	Movie of 2022	Doctor Strange in the Multiverse of Madness	Won	
People's Choice Awards	December 6, 2022	Action Movie of 2022	Doctor Strange in the Multiverse of Madness	Nominated	
People's Choice Awards	December 6, 2022	Female Movie Star of 2022	Elizabeth Olsen	Won	
People's Choice Awards	December 6, 2022	Action Movie Star of 2022	Elizabeth Olsen	Won	
Saturn Awards	October 25, 2022	Best Superhero Film	Doctor Strange in the Multiverse of Madness	Nominated	
Saturn Awards	October 25, 2022	Best Supporting Actor in a Film	Benedict Wong	Nominated	
Saturn Awards	October 25, 2022	Best Film Music	Danny Elfman	Won	
Saturn Awards	October 25, 2022	Best Film Visual / Special Effects	Jorundur Rafn Arnarson, Erik Winquist, and Joe Letteri	Nominated	

== Documentary special ==
In February 2021, the documentary series Marvel Studios: Assembled was announced. The special on this film, "The Making of Doctor Strange in the Multiverse of Madness", was released on Disney+ on July 8, 2022.

== Future ==
In January 2025, Cumberbatch indicated that he would be returning for a third Doctor Strange film. He praised Marvel Studios for their collaborative approach, saying they had discussed who he wanted to write and direct the film as well as what elements from the comic books he was interested in including.
