= Chad Henry =

American dramatist

- Born: October 9, 1946 (age 79); Seattle, Washington
- Education: B.A. University of Washington, 1972; B.F.A., Cornish School of Allied Arts, 1983
- Occupations: Actor, Composer, Lyricist, Playwright
- Partner: Bruce K. Sevy
- Writing career
- Notable works: Angry Housewives; Labor of Love
- Notable awards: Washington State Arts Commission award

Chad Henry (born October 9, 1946) is an American composer, actor, lyricist, playwright, and author. He has written over twenty musical theatre titles that premiere in his home state, Washington. He has long been associated with director/producer Linda Hartzell, artistic director of Seattle Children's Theatre, and with the late John Kauffman, director of many early Empty Space Theatre and Seattle Repertory Theatre works.

== Biography ==
Chad Henry was born on October 9, 1946, in Seattle, Washington to Robert, a drama teacher, and June (nee Condit), a human services coordinator. He served in the United States Army from 1965 to 1968.

He attended University of Washington, where he studied drama and dance, graduating with a B.A. in 1972. He graduated from the Cornish School of Allied Arts with a B.F.A in 1983.

He began writing theatre songs in his early twenties for Empty Space Theatre, for a series of outdoor park shows produced throughout the 1970s and '80s, including titles such as Carlo Goldoni's The Venetian Twins, Voice of the Mountain, Deadwood Dick, Gammer Gurton's Needle, The Sidewalks of New York, and many others. He provided songs and theatre material for productions at most of Seattle's then-extant theatres, including Seattle Repertory Theatre, ACT Theatre, Skid Road Theatre, The Group Theatre, and others.

He co-authored, with A. M. Collins, the long-running rock musical Angry Housewives, which played for seven years in Seattle, breaking all long-run records in that city. Although primarily credited with music and lyrics for that production, Henry contributed in part to the script as well. The show also played for a number of years in several other west coast cities—Portland, Vancouver, B.C., Victoria, B.C., Santa Rosa, California, and elsewhere—each of the above for at least five years each. Angry Housewives played as well in London, Tokyo, Berlin, Sydney, Melbourne, in every major U.S. and Canadian city, had an Off-Broadway run at the Minetta Lane Theatre in New York, was published by Samuel French, and optioned several times for film.

Henry also has written some dozen original musical productions for Seattle Children's Theatre, including Little Lulu, The Magic Mrs. Piggle Wiggle, Nancy and Plum, Doctor Dolittle in the Moon, and The Hoboken Chicken Emergency; and adaptations of Jack and the Beanstalk, Snow White, Pinocchio, Goodnight Moon, Harriet's Halloween Candy, and Sleeping Beauty. His musicals for young audiences have been produced nationally at the leading U.S. children's theatres, including the Children's Theatre Company of Minneapolis, Dallas Children's Theatre, San Diego Junior Theatre, Theatre IV Virginia, the Alabama Shakespeare Festival, and Northwest Children's Theatre in Portland, Oregon.

He adapted Johann Nestroy's Love Affairs and Wedding Bells for the musical theatre with director/librettist Ed Payson Call.

With Katsuhiko Ishizuka of Tokyo's Furusato Caravan, Linda Hartzell of Seattle Children's Theatre, and Norman Langill, U.S. producer of One Reel, Henry created script, music, and lyrics for Labor of Love: A Rice Farmer's Musical, a cooperative musical play, with Japanese and Cajun American actors and musicians. Labor of Love toured throughout Japan, the United States, and played in Barcelona at the Olympics Arts Festival in 1992. Labor was reviewed by Time, Newsweek, the Christian Science Monitor, and NPR, and many arms of the Japanese media. Henry received a Washington State Arts Commission award for his work on Labor of Love.

His novel for young adults, Dogbreath Victorious, was published by Holiday House.

As an actor, Henry has appeared on regional professional stages for the past forty years, playing a variety of roles in theatres such as Denver Center Theatre Company, Seattle Repertory Theatre, ACT Seattle, and elsewhere.

He currently resides in Denver.

== Works ==
=== Stage ===
- The Venetian Twins
- Love Affairs and Wedding Bells
- Voice of the Mountain
- Gammer Gurton's Needle (1975, Seattle), with the Empty Space Uncommon Theatre company
- Deadwood Dick (1979, Seattle), with John Kauffman
- The Sidewalks of New York
- Angry Housewives (1983 Washington, 1986 New York), Composer and Librettist, with A. M. Collins
- Little Lulu (1985, Seattle), adapted from the comic strip by Marjorie Henderson Buell and John Stanley
- Snow White and the Seven Dwarfs (1986, Seattle), with Greg Palmer
- The Hoboken Chicken Emergency (1988, Seattle), adapted from the novel of the same name by Daniel Pinkwater
- Nancy and Plum (1991, Seattle), with Linda Hartzell, based on the books by Betty MacDonald
- Labor of Love: A Rice Farmers Musical (1991, Seattle), with Katsuhiko Ishizuka, Linda Hartzell, and Norman Langill
- Doctor Dolittle in the Moon (1992, Seattle)
- Jack and the Beanstalk (1993, Seattle)
- Pinocchio (1996, Seattle), composer and librettist, with Stevie Kallos
- The Magic Mrs. Piggle Wiggle (2001, San Diego), with Linda Hartzell; based on the books by Betty MacDonald
- Sleeping Beauty (2005, London), with Linda Hartzell and Charles Way
- Harriet's Halloween Candy (2006, Seattle)
- Goodnight Moon (2007, Washington), with Linda Hartzell; based on the book by Margaret Wise Brown and Clement Hurd

=== Books ===
- DogBreath Victorious (Holiday House, 1999)
