= The Magic Mrs. Piggle Wiggle =

The Magic Mrs. Piggle Wiggle is a musical based on the Mrs. Piggle Wiggle books by Betty MacDonald. The book, music and lyrics are by Chad Henry.

The musical was first adapted by Seattle Children's Theatre in 1990, using funds from the National Endowment for the Humanities.

It has since been performed at the Children's Theatre Company in Minneapolis, San Diego Junior Theatre, Studio East and many other regional theatres.
