= The Meanest Man in the World (disambiguation) =

The Meanest Man in the World is a 1943 American comedy film starring Jack Benny, based on the Cohan play.

The Meanest Man in the World may also refer to:

- The Meanest Man in the World, a 1920 American comedy play by George M. Cohan
- The Meanest Man in the World (1923 film), an American silent comedy version of Cohan play

== See also ==
- The Meanest Man in the East, December 1999, chapter 11 of Japanese manga List of One Piece chapters (1–186)
- The Meanest Doll in the World, a 2003 American children's novel
- Meanest Man Alive, a/k/a MMA, a 2015 album by American rapper Jus Allah
