= Missy Piggle-Wiggle =

Book series by Ann M. Martin and Annie Parnell

- Author: Ann M. Martin; Annie Parnell
- Illustrator: Ben Hatke
- Country: United States
- Language: English
- Genre: Children's
- Publisher: Macmillan
- Published: 2016–2018
- Media type: Print
- No. of books: 3
- Preceded by: Mrs. Piggle-Wiggle

Missy Piggle-Wiggle is a series of children's books published between 2016 and 2018, a spinoff from the Mrs. Piggle-Wiggle series first published in 1947. Missy Piggle-Wiggle is the great-niece of the original Mrs. Piggle-Wiggle and she too cures children's bad habits through the use of magic.

The series is written by Ann M. Martin, best known for The Baby-Sitters Club, and Annie Parnell, the great-granddaughter of Mrs. Piggle-Wiggle's author Betty MacDonald. In this series, Mrs. Piggle-Wiggle's husband has gone missing and Mrs. Piggle-Wiggle has set out in search of him, leaving Missy in charge of her house. Missy soon begins helping the children in the neighborhood with her own take on Mrs. Piggle-Wiggle's special magic and cures. The series is set in the modern era, though the nature of the problems and cures remains similar to those in the original works.

The series began with Missy Piggle-Wiggle and the Whatever Cure, published in September 2016, followed by Missy Piggle-Wiggle and the Won't-Walk-the-Dog Cure in September 2017 and Missy Piggle-Wiggle and the Sticky-Fingers Cure in September 2018.

== Stories ==
Chapter Title	Main Character(s)	Problem/Misbehavior	Cure Employed	Other Children Introduced
Missy Piggle-Wiggle and the Whatever Cure
Missy Piggle-Wiggle	--	--	--	--
Juniper Street	--	--	--	Melody Flowers, Tulip Goodenough
The Freeforalls	--	--	--	--
The I-Never-Said-That Cure	Georgie Pepperpot	I-Never-Said-itis (lying about past promises)	Given a magic cookie to eat that forces him to keep his promises	Beaufort Crumpet, Veronica Cupcake
The Greediness Cure	Petulance Freeforall	Greedy and grabby, wanting everything that others have	Magic cookie causes what she covets to shrink to a small speck	Peony LaCarte, Della LaCarte
The Tardiness Cure	Heavenly Earwig	Daydreams and distraction result in constant tardiness	Magic wristwatch causes loud alarm only she can hear when running late; also hears the sounds of other alarms all around her	Cramden Earwig
The Know-It-All Cure	Honoriah Freeforall	Thinks she knows better than everyone how to do things	Magic vapor forces her to give clear and direct lessons whenever anyone asks her what they're doing wrong	Humphrey Baton
The I-Spy Cure	Rusty Goodenough	Constantly peeps and spies on everyone and everything that he can	Magic licorice drops cause anyone he tries to spy upon to be rendered invisible to him	--
The Gum-Smacking Cure	Linden Pettigrew	Constantly smacks and chews gum, making his speech incomprehensible	Given a magic gum ball that constantly changes flavor, but flavors become increasingly nasty	--
The Whatever Cure	Frankfort Freeforall	Hurts and annoys other children; has no empathy and regularly responds to others with "whatever"	Two-step cure; Bubble of Apology traps him in a bubble whenever he won't properly apologize to someone for a wrong and How-Are-You-Doing? pill causes him to ask everyone how they're doing, then truly listen to the answer	--
The Just-One-More-Minute Cure	Samantha Tickle	Will not do things when asked; constantly asks for "just one more minute"	Parents instructed to be firm in giving Samantha a time and telling her there will only be one warning, then let whatever happens happen. Missy Piggle-Wiggle also sends over her talking parrot, Penelope, to babysit.	--
The Freeforalls Again	Mrs. and Mr. Hudson Freeforall	The Freeforall parents are constantly at work, even keeping their cell phones on during mealtimes	The Freeforall children turn Missy's house into a haunted mansion and invite their parents	--
Missy Alone	--	--	--	--
Missy Piggle-Wiggle and the Won't-Walk-the-Dog Cure
The Upside-Down House	--	--	--	--
The Storm	--	--	--	--
The Smarty-Pants Cure	Einstein Treadupon	A smarty-pants who is a genius but always interrupts others, is often rude, and gives long speeches people don't want to hear	Magic blue mist causes Einstein to spout nonsense whenever he tries to talk like a know-it-all, but permits him to speak when talking normally or politely	Fedora Fig, Emmy Fig, Tallulah Treadupon, Marvel Jr Treadupon
The Art of Magic	Melody Flowers	Sad about having to move from her former town of Utopia, believes she has no friends in Little Spring Valley and wishes she could be magic like Missy Piggle-Wiggle to solve her problems	Knowing that not all problems can be cured with magic, Missy Piggle-Wiggle agrees to think on the matter	--
The Won't-Walk-the-Dog Cure	Egmont Dolittle	Continuously forgets to walk, pick up or otherwise care for his pet dog, Sunny	Magic dog biscuit causes the dog to change into a talking dog who is tasked with caring for Egmont, but instead shirking the responsibility, such as watching Dog Whisperer instead of doing his laundry	Caramel Dolittle
The Whiny-Whiners Cure	Austin Forthright, Houston Forthright	Whines about anything and everything, from seeds in jam to being bored	Magic drops make it so that nobody but them can hear themselves whenever they whine, and they can only be heard when they speak normally or politely	--
The Woe-Is-Me Cure	Wareford "Wary" Montpelier	After a string of bad luck, is afraid to so much as even step outside, let alone go on an upcoming vacation	Is sent to stay in Missy's guest-room, which has been turned into a softly padded room and served only soft food	Charlemagne Montpelier
Girls' Day	Melody Flowers	Melody's friends are tired of hearing about how great things were in her former home of Utopia and want her to see she has friends in Little Spring Valley	The group hosts a Girls' Day at Missy Piggle-Wiggle's upside-down house, with Melody as the guest of honor	--
The Silver Key	--	--	--	--
Missy Piggle-Wiggle and the Sticky-Fingers Cure
The Winter Effluvia	--	--	--	--
The Right-Side-Up House	--	--	--	--
The Sticky-Fingers Cure	Louie Grubbermitts	Sticky-fingers - takes other people's stuff without asking	Cinnamon powder sprinkled on breakfast cereal causes anything Louie steals to literally "stick" to him, and the items will not come off until he visits their owners and gives a genuine apology	Rachel Grubbermitts, Elena Grubbermitts, Edwina Nevermore, Zephyr Mason, Stephanie, Ashleigh Dalmatian, Sampson "Sammy" Checkers
The Pants-on-Fire Cure	Almandine Clavicle	Keeps making up stories and tall-tales about achievements and adventures	Peppermint air freshener hung in the Clavicle home causes Almandine's parents to start making up tall tales about themselves, comparing themselves to their new neighbors, as their own unfair comparisons of their daughter to the neighbors' child had prompted her to start making up the tall tales	Putney Cadwallader, Joseph Cadwallader, Benny Cadwallader
The Who's-the-Boss Cure	Veronica Cupcake	Spoiled - is given what she wants and throws a massive tantrum if she doesn't, well past the age when a kid would no longer be expected to have tantrums	Given a chocolate at every meal, which causes Veronica to become dressed up in baby attire anytime she tries to throw a tantrum and do nothing but make crying sounds, until finally she decides on her own to have grown-up conversations instead of throwing tantrums	Isobel Cupcake
The Chatterbox Cure	Gabriel "Gabby" Motormouth	Chatters constantly whenever he has the chance, never allowing anyone else to get a word in edgewise	A magic peppermint causes everyone in his presence to chatter loudly and incessantly until he realizes the value of a proper conversation	Sven Motormouth
The Nitpicker Cure	Tulip Goodenough	Constantly nitpicks and criticizes	A series of magic tablets provide a cure in three stages - in the first stage when Tulip nitpicks something, the issue she pointed out goes away, in the second stage she can make changes to people as well, but in the third stage, she gets a taste of her own medicine when things change after people nitpick her	
The I-Forgot Cure	Roseate "Rosie" Spoonbill	Is extremely forgetful, at one point going missing for two hours because she forgot to go to soccer practice and causing a panic	A peppermint candy causes those around Rosie to forget things instead, forcing her to take charge until she realizes the importance of remembering things	Montrose Sponbill, Poppy Fretwell
Melody Saves the Day		Missy Piggle-Wiggle catches the winter effluvia	Melody Flowers overcomes her fears to take temporary possession of the magic cat, which cures Missy of the flu	
Lester and Dr. Goo				
