= Here Today =

Here Today may refer to:

== Music ==
- Here Today (David Grisman album), 1983
- Here Today (Violent Apathy album), 1983
- "Here Today" (The Beach Boys song), 1966
- "Here Today" (Paul McCartney song), 1982
- Here Today, early name of Vigil (band)

== Other uses ==
- Here Today (novel), a 2004 novel by Ann M. Martin
- Here Today, a 1932 play by George Oppenheimer
- "Here Today" (The West Wing), an episode of The West Wing
- Here Today (film), a 2021 comedy-drama film
