= The Doll People =

2000 children's novel by Ann M. Martin

- Author: Ann M. Martin, Laura Godwin
- Illustrator: Brian Selznick
- Language: English
- Genre: Children's novel
- Publisher: Hyperion Books
- Publication date: August 14, 2000 (1st edition)
- Publication place: United States
- Pages: 272 pp (hardback edition)
- ISBN: 0-7868-0361-4
- OCLC: 38432238
- LC Class: PZ7.M3567585 Do 2000
- Followed by: The Meanest Doll in the World

The Doll People is a children's novel written by Ann M. Martin and Laura Godwin, first released in 2000 by Hyperion Books. It is illustrated by Brian Selznick. It tells a story about the imaginary world of dolls when no one is watching. A doll made from china and her new best friend made of plastic try to find her aunt that long ago went on an adventure and never came back. Others in the series include The Meanest Doll in the World, The Runaway Dolls, The Doll People Set Sail, and The Doll People's Christmas (picture book).

== Plot ==
Annabelle and her family are ceramic dolls that have existed for over a century. They belong to an eight-year-old girl named Kate Palmer, having previously been owned by Kate's great-grandmother Gertrude when she was born in 1898, her grandmother Katherine, and her mother Annie. The dolls can move, talk, and play the miniature piano in their house but always return to the same spot they started from when a human approaches. The consequence of being seen moving is being "frozen" for twenty-four hours, also called Doll State. If a doll does something especially incriminating, the doll is "frozen" forever, called Permanent Doll State. Kate's sister Nora receives a doll house and plastic doll family named the Funcrafts for her fifth birthday. Tiffany, the Funcrafts' daughter, becomes Annabelle's best friend. Together they form a group called the Society for Exploration and Location of Missing Persons (or SELMP for short) when Annabelle finds her Auntie Sarah's journal. Auntie Sarah has been missing for 45 years and has not been seen or heard from in that time. Using the clues from the journal, the SELMP deduces she is stuck somewhere, so they go on a journey and successfully locate her. The doll family is happily reunited once again.
