= Mrs. Piggle-Wiggle =

Book by Betty MacDonald

- First edition of Mrs. Piggle-Wiggle
- Mrs. Piggle-Wiggle; Mrs. Piggle-Wiggle's Magic; Mrs. Piggle-Wiggle's Farm; Hello, Mrs. Piggle-Wiggle; Happy Birthday, Mrs. Piggle-Wiggle
- Author: Betty MacDonald; Anne MacDonald Canham (Happy Birthday, Mrs. Piggle-Wiggle)
- Illustrator: Richard Bennett; Kurt Wiese; Maurice Sendak (Mrs. Piggle-Wiggle's Farm); Hilary Knight; Alexandra Boiger
- Country: United States
- Language: English
- Genre: Children's
- Publisher: HarperCollins
- Published: 1947–1957; 2007
- Media type: Print
- No. of books: 5
- Followed by: Missy Piggle-Wiggle

Mrs. Piggle-Wiggle is a series of children's books written by Betty MacDonald. The first book is Mrs. Piggle-Wiggle, published in 1947; three sequels by MacDonald are Mrs. Piggle-Wiggle's Magic, Mrs. Piggle-Wiggle's Farm, and Hello, Mrs. Piggle-Wiggle (1949 to 1957). Happy Birthday, Mrs. Piggle-Wiggle (2007) was completed by her daughter Anne MacDonald Canham based on "notes for other stories among her mother's possessions".

A 2016 spinoff series by Ann M. Martin and McDonald's great-granddaughter Annie Parnell featured Mrs. Piggle-Wiggle's great-niece, Missy Piggle-Wiggle.

== Synopsis ==
The Mrs. Piggle-Wiggle series is about a small woman who lives in an upside-down house in a lively neighborhood inhabited mainly by children who have bad habits.

Mrs. Piggle-Wiggle has a chest full of magical cures left to her by her deceased husband, Mr. Piggle-Wiggle, who was a pirate. In the first two books of the series, Mrs. Piggle-Wiggle (1947) and Mrs. Piggle-Wiggle's Magic (1949), Mrs. Piggle-Wiggle provides parents with cures for their children's bad habits. Cures range from the mundane (the "Won't-Pick-Up-Toys Cure", allowing a small boy to continue leaving his toys scattered about his room until the room becomes so cluttered that he is unable to escape) to the fantastic (the "Interrupting Cure", a special powder that is blown on the interrupter, which causes the person to become temporarily mute every time they try to interrupt someone).

In the series' third book, Mrs. Piggle-Wiggle's Farm (1954), Mrs. Piggle-Wiggle sells her house in town and buys a farm, where with the assistance of a large assortment of animals she continues to help children overcome their bad habits. In this collection, Mrs. Piggle-Wiggle uses no magic for her cures; the farm itself does the most good. In the fourth book, Hello, Mrs. Piggle-Wiggle (1957) she has apparently returned to her original neighborhood and to her magical cures. No mention of the farm is made for the rest of the series.

The Mrs. Piggle-Wiggle stories were based on bedtime stories MacDonald made up for her daughters, nephews, and nieces (and later grandchildren and grandnephews/-nieces). Some of the 151 children have the same names as members of the original audience (for example, there is a pair of brothers called Darsie and Bard). This explains some of the inconsistencies, such as Mrs. Piggle-Wiggle being either a good witch/fairy or just someone who understands child psychology better than most professors of the subject.

The final book in the series, Happy Birthday, Mrs. Piggle Wiggle (2007), was published sixty years after the original, and is largely written by MacDonald's daughter, Anne MacDonald Canham (the two share a writing credit for this book). The first story in the book is an unpublished MacDonald story, while Anne explains in the book that the remaining stories are based on "notes for other stories among her mother's possessions."

The first editions of Mrs. Piggle-Wiggle and Mrs. Piggle-Wiggle's Magic were illustrated by Richard Bennett and Kurt Wiese respectively. Subsequent editions of Mrs. Piggle-Wiggle, Mrs. Piggle-Wiggle's Magic, and Hello, Mrs. Piggle-Wiggle were illustrated by Hilary Knight. Mrs. Piggle-Wiggle's Farm was illustrated by Maurice Sendak. Happy Birthday, Mrs. Piggle-Wiggle was illustrated by Alexandra Boiger.

== Stories ==
Chapter Title	Main Character(s)	Problem/Misbehavior	Cure Employed	Other Children Introduced
Mrs. Piggle-Wiggle
Mrs. Piggle-Wiggle, Herself	Mary Lou Robertson, Kitty Wheeling	Hates washing dishes (Mary Lou), hates making beds (Kitty)	Makes both tasks a fun game and a race	Bobby Wheeling, Dicky Williams, Max
The Won't-Pick-Up-Toys Cure	Hubert Prentiss	Will not pick up his toys	Left alone with his toys until he is unable to leave his room when Mrs. Piggle-Wiggle leads a parade past his house	Charlie, Billy Peters, Tommy Peters, Ermintrude Bags, Gregory Moohead, Susan Grapple
The Answer-Backer Cure	Molly O'Toole (mostly called Mary in this book, renamed Molly subsequently)	Rudeness	Penelope the parrot is equally rude, giving her a taste of her own medicine	Calliope Ragbag, Chuckie Keystop, Garry Garrison
The Selfishness Cure	Dick Thompson	Refuses to share anything	A "selfishness kit" labels everything as Dick's property, causing him embarrassment when other children ridicule him	Bobby Slater, Kenny Hatch
The Radish Cure	Patsy Waters	Will not take baths	Left unbathed so she is caked with dirt, then radishes are planted on her	Prunella Brown, Paraphernalia Grotto, Cormorant Broomrack
The Never-Want-To-Go-To-Bedders Cure	Bobby Gray, Larry Gray, Susan Gray	Does not want to go to bed	Allowed to stay up late until they are so tired they cannot function during the day, missing activities such as birthday parties	Catherine Grassfeather, Wilfred Grassfeather, Worthington Gardenfield, Guinevere Gardenfield
The Slow-Eater-Tiny-Bite-Taker Cure	Allen	Slow eater	Served meals on progressively smaller dishes until he lacks energy to function	Wetherill Crankminor, Pergola Wingsproggle
The Fighter-Quarrelers Cure	Anne Russell, Joan Russell	Bickering	Parents mimic the fighting of the children, demonstrating how unpleasant it is to those around them	Jasper Quitrick, Myrtle Quitrick
Mrs. Piggle-Wiggle's Magic
Mrs. Piggle-Wiggle's Magic	--	--	--	Marilyn Matson, Johnny Wilfred, Julie Ward, Johnny Green
The Thought-You-Saiders Cure	Darsie Burbank, Alison Burbank, Bard Burbank	Deliberately misinterpreting others as a joke	Small powder makes hearing super-sensitive when sprinkled in the ear (example; makes turning on a light switch sound like a gunshot or a water faucet like Niagara Falls)	Terry Teagle, Theresa Teagle
The Tattletale Cure	Wendy Hamilton, Timmy Hamilton	Tattling	Pills convert tattletales into puffs of smoke with tails	Jimmy Murton, Marty Phillips
The Bad-Table-Manners Cure	Christopher Brown	Bad table manners	Lester the pig demonstrates beautiful table manners	Percy Penzil, Pamela Penzil, Potter Penzil
The Interrupters	Benji Franklin, Sally Franklin, Stevie Franklin	Interrupting	Interrupter Powder takes away the voice of someone who interrupts	--
The Heedless Breaker	Sharon Rogers	Carelessness and clumsiness	Powder slows down bodily movement	--
The Never-Want-To-Go-To-Schooler	Jody Jones	Truancy	Ignorance Tonic induces stupidity, causing him to desire knowledge	Jan Jones, Julie Jones, Linda Jones, Armand Armadillo
The Waddle-I-Doers	Lee Wharton, Mimi Wharton	Boredom	A treasure hunt	--; this story includes most of the children from the first two books
Mrs. Piggle-Wiggle's Farm
The Not Truthful Cure	Fetlock Harroway	Lying	Mrs. Piggle-Wiggle's animals ensure that there is no need to lie in order to impress	Wembley Rustad, Winifred Feathering, Williver Mallett
The Pet Forgetter Cure	Rebecca Rolfe	Forgets to take care of pets	Mrs. Piggle-Wiggle "forgets" to feed her and locks her out of the farmhouse, so she knows how it feels	Cedric Bent-Smith, Eunice Hendricks
The Destructiveness Cure	Jeffie Phillips	Takes things apart and cannot reassemble them	Everything he takes apart brings him more work, prompting him to learn how to fix things	Billy Robinson, Donnie Harpoon, Wickie Rockstall, Electra Rockstall
The Fraidy-Cat Cure	Phoebe Jackstraw	Irrational fear	An emergency helps her overcome her fear and find inner strength	Jeremy Jackstraw, Chuckie Jackstraw, Georgie Jackstraw, Imogene Haversack, Shirley Melancholy, Kathy Melancholy
The Can't Find It Cure	Morton Heatherwick	Easily distracted	Shamed into focusing when his help is needed	Enterprise Beecham
Hello, Mrs. Piggle-Wiggle
The Show-Off Cure	Phillip Carmody	Showing off	Show-off Powder makes him invisible when showing off	Connie Carmody, Bobby Westover, Billy Markle
The Crybaby Cure	Melody Foxglove	Excessive crying	Crybaby Tonic makes her unable to stop her tears when crying	Cornell Foxglove, Harvard Foxglove, Emmy Foxglove, Trent Popsickle, Tansy Popsickle, Betsy Wilt
The Bully	Nicholas Semicolon	Cruelty to younger children and animals	Leadership Pills bring out leadership qualities (Bullybaths, which weaken the bather so they can be pushed around, are rejected in favor of the pills)	Roscoe Eager, Billy MacIntosh, Sylvia Crouch, Jimmy Gopher, Priscilla Wick, the Adams twins
The Whisperer	Evelyn Rover, Mary Crackle, Cornelia Whitehouse	Gossipy whispering	Whisper Stick, a stick of magical candy, takes away the voice	Karen Elroyd, Bobby Crackle, Billy Crackle, Corinthian Bop
The Slowpoke	Harbin Quadrangle	Daydreaming	Special spray makes him extremely alert and focused	Sylvia Quadrangle, Janey Quadrangle, Annabell, Mona, Kathy, Georgie Wilcox
Happy Birthday, Mrs. Piggle-Wiggle
The Just-One-More-TV-Show Cure	Kitten Hanover, Sean Hanover	Television addiction	Aversion technique; forcing them to watch until they resist it	Robin Waxbean, Lark Waxbean, Honor Hatchet, Honesty Hatchet, Henry Fence, Billy Ragweed
The Won't-Brush-Teeth Cure	Betsy Applebee	Brushing her teeth is unimportant	Wag the dog demonstrates proper tooth brushing	Ellen, Rose Thorngate, Jasmine Thorngate, Jervil Thorngate Jr.
The Insult Cure	Blake Branson	Cruelty to others	Insults written on paper glow blindingly in the dark of his bedroom	Percival Goodwin, Prissy Goodwin, Candace Goodwin
The Picky-Eater Cure	Will Pemberton	Picky eating	Crystals transform any food into white noodles; the effect being that he will want to try other things	Ariel Wingstaff, Finch Wingstaff
The Afraid-to-Try Cure	Jonathan Campbell	Overly cautious	Rescuing Lightfoot the cat from a tree helps him overcome his timidity	George O'Connor, Timmy O'Connor, Ricky Timbers, Woody Timbers
The Messy Stuff-and-Cram Cure	Katy McCloud	Messiness	Invisible paint around her room prevents her from moving until every area is neat	Prunella Peasley, Quinton Peasley
The Never-Finish Cure	Janie Beaumont	Inability to complete one task before moving on to another	Powder makes her unable to move to another task until she finishes the current one	Christie Anne McClanahan, Carrie Philpot, Larry Philpot
Mrs. Piggle-Wiggle's Birthday Party	--	--	--	Matt McGregor, Kevin McGregor; this story also includes children from all five books

== In other media ==
- In 1990, a musical based on the books was created, The Magic Mrs. Piggle Wiggle.
- In 1994, the books were made into a TV series created by Shelley Duvall and starring Jean Stapleton.
