= Mary Bard =

American author (1904–1970)

Mary Bard Jensen (1904–1970) was a 20th-century American writer best remembered as the sister of Betty MacDonald (Mrs. Piggle-Wiggle, The Egg and I). Bard was the author of the three-volume Best Friends series for girls, including Best Friends (1955), Best Friends in Summer (1960), and Best Friends at School. She also wrote three autobiographical works: The Doctor Wears Three Faces (1949), Forty Odd (1952), and Just Be Yourself (1956). The 1950 film Mother Didn't Tell Me was based on her first autobiographical book, which covered the courtship with her husband.

Mary Bard was born in Butte, Montana on November 21, 1904, to Darsie Campbell Bard and Elsie Tholimar (née Sanderson) Bard. She had four younger siblings: writer Betty MacDonald, Dorothea Bard, Alison Bard, Sydney Cleveland Bard, and Sylvia Bard, the latter of which died in infancy. With their mining engineer father, the family traveled all over the country, moving so frequently that Bard did not complete one uninterrupted year of school until she was 13. She attended the University of Washington from 1924-26.

After leaving the University of Washington, Bard worked in stints as a stenographer, filing clerk, and switchboard operator, she settled on advertising and wrote radio commercials.

In 1934, Bard married pathologist Clyde Reynolds Jensen, with whom she had three daughters.

Jensen died in December 1970 of a stroke at age 66.

== Works ==
- The Doctor Wears Three Faces (1949)
- Forty Odd (1952)
- Best Friends (1955)
- Just Be Yourself (1956)
- Best Friends in Summer (1960)
- Best Friends at School (1961)
