= Charles Divine =

American poet and playwright

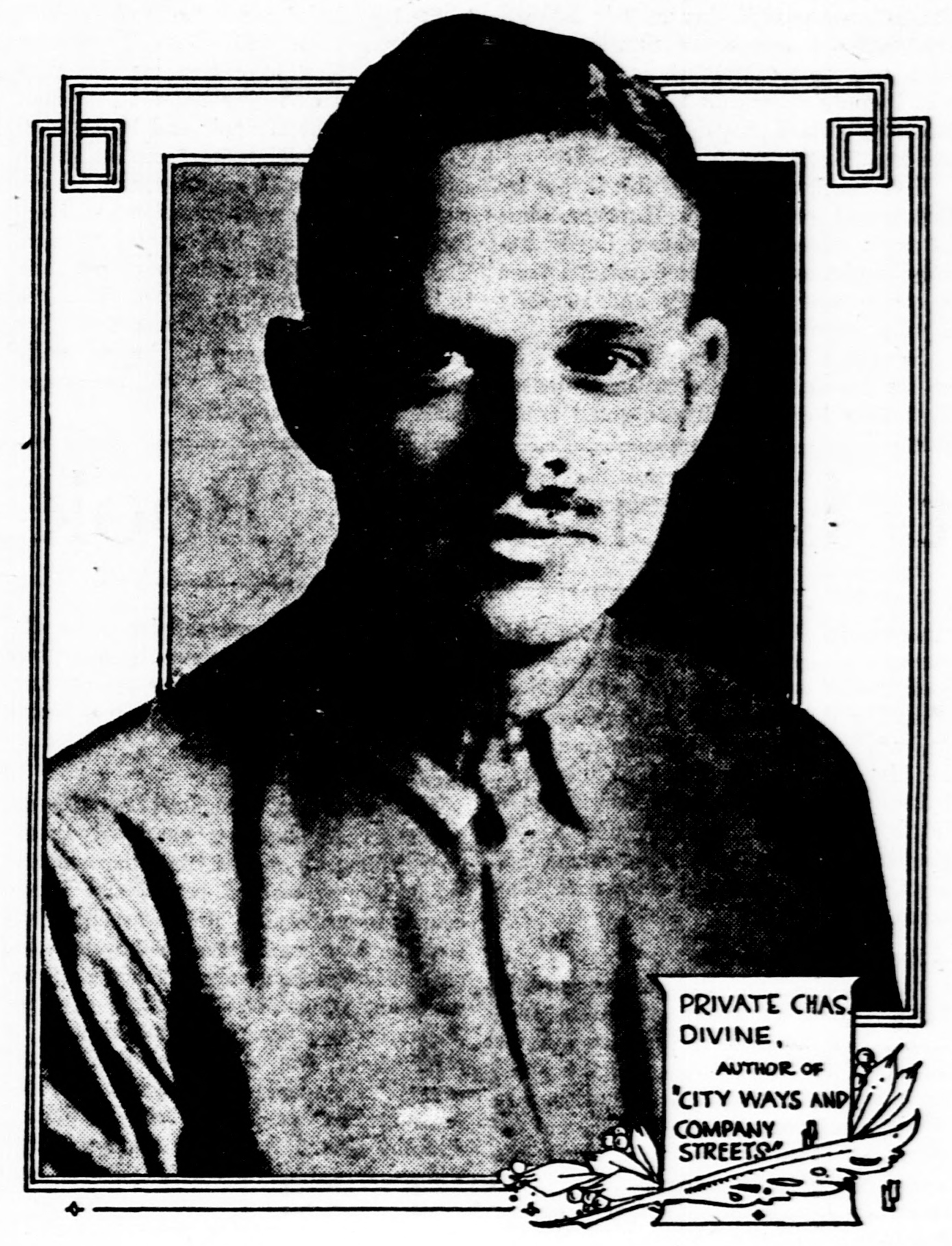
Divine, c. 1918

Charles Harding Divine (January 20, 1889 – May 8, 1950) was an American poet and playwright. He was a soldier in World War I, and his first book of poems in 1918 was praised by reviewers, one of whom said he was one of the most important American poets of the day.

== Early life and education ==
Divine was born in Binghamton, New York on January 20, 1889. He attended Cornell University, where he worked for The Cornell Daily Sun and was a member of the Quill and Dagger society. He graduated from Cornell in 1911.

== Career ==
Divine worked as a reporter for The New York Sun until 1916, when he became a full-time writer. In 1917, after being previously rejected due to being underweight, he enlisted and fought in the 27th Division during World War I, where he served in France. Following the war he published books of poems and plays up to 1936, when he took up farming.

He was a Senior Instructor in English in Triple Cities College, now Binghamton University, in Endicott, New York, until 1948. He adapted two of his short plays for comedy films. His novel Cognac Hill was about love on the Western Front. In addition to his books he published more than 100 short stories. Some of his poems were reprinted in magazines during the World War II and a line from one of them, At the Lavender Lantern, referring to a café in Greenwich Village, inspired the name of a book Onions in the Stew.

== Death ==
Divine died May 8, 1950, in Bay Pines, Florida.

== Publications ==
=== Poetry ===
- City Ways and Company Streets (1918) Moffat, Yard & Co.
- Gypsy Gold (1923) T. Seltzer
- The Road to Town: A Book of Poems (1925) T. Seltzer

=== Plays ===
- Post Mortems: A Comedy of the Bridge Table (1926) D. Appleton & Co.
- Pirtle Drums it in (1926) D. Appleton & Co.
- Love in an Attic: A Play in One Act (1928) S. French Ltd
- Mr. Utley's Etiquette: A Comedy in One Act (1928) S. French Ltd
- Strangers at Home: A Play in Three Acts (1935) S. French Ltd
- Appetite for Adventure: A Comedy in One Act (1936) S. French Ltd

=== Novel ===
- Cognac Hill (1927) Payson & Clarke Ltd

=== Films ===
- Post Mortems (1929)
