= Eleven Kids, One Summer =

1991 novel by Ann M. Martin

- First edition
- Author: Ann M. Martin
- Language: English
- Genre: Children novel
- Publisher: Holiday House
- Publication date: 1991
- Publication place: United States
- Media type: Print (hardback & paperback)
- ISBN: 978-0-8234-0912-9
- OCLC: 23287861

Eleven Kids, One Summer is a children's novel written by Ann M. Martin in 1991. It is the sequel to Ten Kids, No Pets.

== Plot ==
Eleven Kids, One Summer continues the story of the children of the Rosso family as they summer on a beach on Fire Island. The story also reveals that the youngest child, who had yet to be born in the previous book, is a boy named Keegan according to Mrs. Rosso's naming scheme.

Each chapter entails a story featuring a child of the family as they find some sort of adventure during their vacation. The children are: Abigail (Abbie), Bainbridge, Calandra (Candy), Dagwood (Woody), Eberhard (Hardy), Faustine and Gardenia (Dinnie) (the twins), Hannah, Ira, Janthina (Jan) and Keegan.
