= Onions in the Stew =

Book by Betty MacDonald

- 1956 Book Club edition
- Author: Betty MacDonald
- Language: English
- Publication date: 1955

Onions in the Stew is the fourth in a series of humorous autobiographical books by Betty MacDonald about her life in western Washington State with her second husband and daughters during the Second World War years. It was published in 1955 and a second edition in 1956.

== Title ==
The title comes from a quotation by Charles Divine (1889-1950) in his poem "At the Lavender Lantern":

"Some said it was Bohemia, this little haunt we knew
When hearts were high and fortunes low, and onions in the stew" (Note: The poem is about a "snug cafe, half restaurant, half home" remembered by a soldier in the First World War. Bohemia here refers to a happy free place, the haunt of Bohemians rather than the country.)

== Synopsis ==
The book opens just after Pearl Harbor; divorced mother Betty and her two daughters, 12-year-old Anne and 11-year-old Joan, are living in Betty's mother's home and Betty works in a building contractor's office. She meets and marries Donald MacDonald. Their search for a home is made difficult by the wartime influx of population into the greater Seattle area, but they find a property on Vashon Island. Their house was intended as a summer home, so it is cold in winter and their priorities change. "Creosote logs" on the beach are highly prized. Stormy weather brings a "bark tide" of firewood which must be quickly gathered. Various neighbours provide help, hindrance or confusion.

The early part describes the problems of settling into a rural community without urban infrastructure. One issue is commuting from a home without a road. The family has the choice of the beach, if the tide is low, or walking to a neighbor's driveway to catch the school bus. The adults must follow a muddy trail to catch a ferry, usually in a rush. At the same time, there are quite poetic pieces on some of the joys of getting food from the sea and land, and domestic scenes of the girls going through adolescence.

As one reviewer put it: “Betty MacDonald sets down some facts which a prospective islander must face up to before he decides to move from the mainland. She reminds you that guests are often with you for seven days; that any definite appointments act as a signal for the ferry boats to stop running; that finding island property is easy but financing it is difficult; that a telephone call from a relative means you will be keeping someone’s children; that any dinner can be stretched by the addition of noodles to something; and that anyone contemplating island dwelling must be physically strong but it is an added advantage if you aren’t too bright.”

== Reception ==
U.S. Senator Richard L. Neuberger, writing in The New York Times Review of Books, compared her humorous take on life in a regional American setting to the work of Mark Twain, commenting: “Betty’s adventures on the fringe of the Western wilderness have served equally to furnish grain for her literary mill…Betty MacDonald is a shrewd and discerning woman who sees mankind clearly.”

== Television ==
An adaptation was shown on TV in the series Robert Montgomery Presents on NBC on September 17, 1956.
