= The Hoboken Chicken Emergency =

1977 children's book by Daniel and Jill Pinkwater

- First edition
- Author: Daniel and Jill Pinkwater (as "D. Manus Pinkwater")
- Genre: Children's literature
- Publisher: Prentice-Hall
- Publication date: 1977
- ISBN: 0-1339-2514-5
- OCLC: 608326953

The Hoboken Chicken Emergency is a 1977 children's book by Daniel and Jill Pinkwater.

== Plot summary ==
The main character, Arthur Bobowitz, is asked to pick up a reserved turkey for his family's Thanksgiving dinner. However, the meat market has lost their reservation and has no unclaimed turkeys or any other type of bird available for purchase, nor does any other market in the entire city of Hoboken. Arthur eventually finds an eccentric old man, who sells him a live chicken named Henrietta that weighs 266 pounds (121 kg). The Bobowitz family welcomes her with open arms and full hearts, but the neighbors are not so sure. Everyone in town is horrified after Henrietta escapes.

== In other media ==
In 1984, The Hoboken Chicken Emergency was adapted into a television movie starring Peter Billingsley, Dick Van Patten, and Gabe Kaplan. It was adapted into a play by Chad Henry in 1988.
