= Bummer Summer =

1983 novel by Ann M. Martin

- First edition (publ. Holiday House)
- Author: Ann M. Martin
- Language: English
- Genre: Children's literature
- Publisher: Holiday House
- Publication date: 1983
- Publication place: United States
- Media type: Print
- Pages: 152 p.
- ISBN: 9780823404834
- OCLC: 8954576

Bummer Summer is Ann M. Martin's first novel. She started writing it in 1980 and it was published in 1983.

== Plot summary ==
The central character, Kamilla Whitlock, who is known as "Kammy" or "Kams" lives with her father, Robert Whitlock, and a housekeeper named Andrew Croswell, in a sleepy east coast town. Kammy's mother Annie died in a car crash when Kammy was four. Eight years later, her father has remarried. His new wife, Kate, who is nineteen years younger than he is, has a three-year-old daughter named Muffin and an unnamed son called Baby Boy. There are conflicts, and Kammy's father and stepmother offer to send her to summer camp at Camp Arrowhead. Kamilla is reluctant but ends up going anyway. While she is at camp, she meets new friends. One of her best friends is Emily, a girl that has been to the camp a few years. She also unfortunately meets a new archenemy, Susie, who considers herself "Miss Perfect," and tries to outstrip everything that Kammy does. But Susie alone can't ruin Kammy's summer-her summer turns out to not be so bad after all.
