= Yours Turly, Shirley =

Book by Ann M. Martin

- First edition
- Author: Ann M. Martin
- Language: English
- Genre: Children's novel
- Publisher: Holiday House
- Publication date: 1988
- Publication place: United States
- Media type: Print (hardback & paperback)
- ISBN: 0-8234-0719-5
- OCLC: 17649340

Yours Turly, Shirley is a children's novel written by Ann M. Martin, published in 1988 and involving dyslexia as a theme. The title is often mistaken as Yours Truly, Shirley.

== Plot ==
Shirley Basini is in fourth grade. Her scholastic performance is poor because she is dyslexic (which is why the title spells "Truly" as "Turly"). Her disability makes reading difficult for her. She ends up struggling with feelings of inferiority and fears of disappointing her parents, especially since her older brother is intellectually gifted. To hide her inner anxieties, she horses around in class, much to the displeasure of her strict teacher. To add pressure to the situation, if she does not do well in school this year, she will probably be held back.

When Shirley's parents decide to adopt a Vietnamese baby boy as their own, Shirley is mildly happy that her parents' attention will no longer be focused upon her. When a mix up results in the possibility of having a slightly younger sister instead, Shirley becomes excited with the prospect of being able to teach and help someone learn how to speak English and help educate her about the American culture.

Shirley's new younger sister, "Jackie", soon becomes devoted to Shirley. Jackie is eager to learn from her older sister and they become fast friends. When Jackie ends up excelling in school and moves from the regular third grade class to an advanced one, Shirley begins to feel threatened and jealous. She fears that Jackie will no longer need her. For example, during a spelling bee Shirley is angered by the fact that Jackie can spell the required words, while Shirley struggles.

When she stops making an effort at school, an unexpected challenge arises in the two sisters' relationship and forces Shirley to come to terms with her role as Jackie's sister and beginning to understand her own strengths. With extra help from the school resource room, Shirley begins to succeed in school in her own way.
