= A Corner of the Universe =

2002 young adult novel by Ann M. Martin

- First edition
- Author: Ann M. Martin
- Language: English
- Genre: Realistic Fiction
- Publisher: Scholastic
- Publication date: October 1, 2002
- Publication place: United States
- Media type: Hardcover and Softcover
- Pages: 189
- ISBN: 978-0-439-38880-1
- OCLC: 48536634
- LC Class: PZ7.M3567585 Cq 2002

A Corner of the Universe is a 2002 young adult novel by Ann M. Martin. It won a Newbery Honor Award in 2003.

== Plot ==
The summer of 1960 is a season that the novel's narrator and protagonist, 11-almost-12-year-old Hattie Owen, expects to be as comfortably uneventful as all the others had been in her small, tranquil town of Millerton, Pennsylvania. She's looking forward to helping her mother Dorothy run their boarding house with its eccentric adult boarders, painting alongside her father Jonathan, and reading.

Then 21-year-old Uncle Adam, whom Hattie never knew existed, comes to stay with Hattie's grandparents (Nana and Papa), because his "school," an institution for the mentally disabled, has closed down permanently. Intelligent, childlike, and strange owing to his disability, Adam visits Hattie often. Adam quickly becomes smitten with Angel Valentine, the beautiful and most recent lodger to check into the Owen boardinghouse.

Hattie then meets Leila, the daughter of the carnival owners who come to town. However, after Adam suffers a mental breakdown on the Ferris wheel, she moves away with the carnival.

Throughout the summer, other people come to stay at Hattie's boarding house, such as a woman, Mrs. Strowsky, with a son Sam and daughter Catherine. She recently suffered the death of her husband and moved away, but needed a place to stay while job hunting.

As various other events mark Hattie's "uneventful" summer, she comes to better understand Adam. However, when Adam unintentionally walks in on Angel with her boyfriend Henry, he is upset and runs off. His body is later found, revealing he had died by suicide. Hattie is devastated. Before Adam's funeral, Hattie asks her mother if she loved her brother. She snapped at Hattie, and said it was hard to love him. Hattie speaks at the funeral about Adam, and afterward, she discovers his treasure box, where he kept all the letters and objects Hattie's mom sent him. She realized her mother did actually love Adam.

Two months later, Angel moves out with Henry. Hattie's family cleans out Adam's room. Mrs. Strowsky found a job, and they move out. The book ends with Hattie turning off a film of Adam, and she realizes he revealed a corner of her Universe.

== Characters ==
Hattie Owen: An 11-almost-12-year-old girl; protagonist who lives in and runs a boarding house.

Adam Mercer: Hattie's mentally ill uncle who turns Hattie's life around, 21 years old. He is a huge fan of I Love Lucy.

Jonathan Owen: Hattie's father and an artist who helps run the family boarding house.

Dorothy Owen: Hattie's mother and Adam's older sister.

Harriet "Nana" Mercer: Hattie's strict and wealthy grandmother.

Hayden "Papa" Mercer: Hattie's grandfather and a Millerton lawyer.

Miss Hagerty: A boarder living in the Owen boardinghouse. She serves as a grandmother-figure to Hattie.

Angel Valentine: The beautiful new boarder living in the Owen boarding house. Adam develops feelings for her but dies by suicide after seeing her with her new boyfriend.

Leila: The daughter of Fred Carmel of Fred Carmel's Funtime Carnival, becomes a close friend of Hattie.

Mr. Penny: A clockmaker and boarder of the Owen's boardinghouse.

== Reception ==
Kirkus highly commended the author stating: "Martin’s voice for Hattie is likable, clear, and consistent; her prose doesn’t falter. A solid, affecting read." While Publishers Weekly wrote in a starred review: "[h]earts will go out to both Hattie and Adam as they step outside the confines of their familiar world to meet some painful challenges."
