= A Dog's Life: The Autobiography of a Stray =

2005 novel by Ann M. Martin

- First edition cover
- Author: Ann M. Martin
- Illustrator: Scholastic Inc.
- Language: English
- Genre: Realistic Fiction
- Publisher: Scholastic Inc.
- Publication date: October 1, 2005
- Media type: Print (paperback)
- Pages: 192 pp
- ISBN: 0-439-71559-8
- OCLC: 58043465

A Dog's Life: The Autobiography of a Stray is a children's novel written in 2005 by Ann M. Martin and is published by Scholastic Books. The target audience for this book is grades 4–7. It is written from the first-person perspective of a female stray dog named Squirrel. Ann M. Martin bases her books on personal experiences and contemporary problems or events.

Martin is a children's author from Princeton, New Jersey. All of the characters in her books are fictional, although some are based on real people. Martin has written many popular children's titles including The Baby-sitters Club series and the California Diaries series. Her book A Corner of the Universe, received a Newbery Honor Award. She had since written a sequel called “Everything For A Dog” that was published in 2011.

== Plot ==
=== Part 1 ===
Squirrel is a mixed-breed dog who lives in a shed behind the summer home of a wealthy family, there, she lives with her mother, Stream, and brother, Bone. Squirrel and Bone were the only two puppies to survive out of a litter of five. While living in the shed, Their mother teaches Squirrel and Bone how to hunt and find food, as well as to avoid being seen by humans. When Stream leaves after Mine the fox was killed, Squirrel and Bone set out on their own. Bone is very adventurous and Squirrel follows him through the woods and from town to town in search of food and shelter. The puppies are eventually picked up by highway travelers named Marcy and George who consider adopting them. They take them home for the night before George decides not to keep the dogs and throws them out of a car window in a mall parking lot. Squirrel and Bone are injured and Bone is taken away by other shoppers immediately after being tossed from the car, leaving Squirrel alone. Squirrel and Bone never see each other again.

=== Part 2 ===
Alone and hungry, Squirrel meets another female stray, Moon, by the road. The two dogs became fast friends together for warmth and searching for food in garbage cans and trash in the woods.

=== Part 3 ===
One day, Squirrel and Moon, starving, attempt to catch two chipmunks on a fallen log. So intent are they in their hunting, they fail to hear an approaching truck; and the truck hits and kills Moon but Squirrel suffers only a damaged shoulder. Squirrel and Moon are taken to the vet by the family who hit them. There, the gentle Dr. Roth pronounces Moon dead, but applies himself to meeting Squirrel's needs. Squirrel is alone, again. Spayed and treated, she is renamed Daisy and is adopted by the family for the summer. Squirrel lives in the garage and plays with the family's children every day. She is also fed twice a day, until one day in autumn when the family leaves their summer home and Squirrel is abandoned. She wanders for years until she finds herself back at the mall parking lot where she and Bone were separated. Squirrel follows a scent that reminds her of Bone through the woods, but she does not find him.

=== Part 4 ===
Squirrel, now an old dog with bloody paws, takes cover from the weather in a shed in the back yard of an old woman named Susan. Squirrel observes Susan, accepting water and food, but not ready to trust another human person. Susan proves her good intentions by leaving food and water out and not forcing Squirrel to do anything she doesn't want to do. Susan talks incessantly, clearly needing someone to talk to. Susan tries to coax Squirrel inside when the weather turns bitterly cold. Susan had a dog named Maxie in the past, so she knew how to take care of dogs. When she finally gets Squirrel inside, Susan decides to keep her and renames her "Addie." Susan and Squirrel spend their days running errands in town and cuddling up on the couch. The two spend the rest of their lives together.

== Character list ==
=== Squirrel/Daisy/Addie ===
Squirrel is the protagonist of the book, and it is written from her point of view. She is a female stray puppy who is one of two surviving puppies in a litter of five. Squirrel enjoys hunting, a skill which she learned from her mother. After her mother goes missing, Squirrel moves from place to place following her brother Bone, and then later with her new friend Moon, before she ventures by herself in her adult life, wandering and observing the world through her solitary canine understanding for several years. She smells every situation and place, along with visual and auditory clues. Her driving force is for water, food, safety and warmth. Squirrel has many tragic events happen in her life, but in the end, against all odds, she finds a comforting purpose in companionship with a human.

=== Bone ===
Bone is the brother of Squirrel. He is a male stray puppy who is one of two surviving puppies in a litter of five. After his mother disappears, Bone leads Squirrel from place to place. He was separated from his sister Squirrel when George threw both of them out of the car window. He has a pretty rough attitude and is very protective of his sister.

=== Stream ===
Stream is the mother of Squirrel and Bone. She cares for her puppies in a wheel burrow in an old shed until they are strong enough to adventure themselves. She teaches them to be aware of humans and how to hunt. She leaves the shed one morning and does not return.

=== Mine ===
Mine is a fox who lived underneath the Merrion's new garden shed and had four kits. The fox was the enemy of the animals living on the property because she was dangerous. She is killed when the Merrion patriarch shoots her.

=== Matthias Merrion ===
The youngest son of the family who owned the shed that Stream, Bone and Squirrel lived in. Matthias discovered Squirrel and Bone but kept the dogs a secret from his family. Matthias brought the dogs scraps of food and toys to play with. Matthias was the dogs' first human interaction.

=== Yellow Man ===
A cat who lived in the shed with the dogs. The cats lived in nesting boxes in the opposite corner of the shed from the dogs. Yellow Man greeted the dogs every morning and was curious of them.

=== Marcy ===
The wife of George. She and George find Squirrel and Bone on the side of the highway and take them home. Marcy wants to keep the dogs, and George doesn't allow her to. Marcy feeds them and cleans up their messes, hoping that they will become tame pets.

=== George ===
The husband of Marcy. He and Marcy find Squirrel and Bone on the side of the highway and take them home. George doesn't think that the dogs are worth the trouble. When Marcy leaves for work, George throws them out the car window at the mall and injures them both.

=== Moon ===
A female stray that Squirrel makes friends with after Bone disappears. Moon was a small dog, who resembled Bone. Moon and Squirrel took turns caring for each other when they were hurt. Moon is described as being brave, adventurous, and loving. Moon and Squirrel travel together from town to town for years, sneaking garbage at night and fighting other dogs when necessary. Moon's best friend was Squirrel. When Moon is killed by the Becker's pickup truck when crossing the road, Squirrel is very sad.

=== Dr. Roth ===
A veterinarian who looks after Moon and Squirrel when they are brought into the vet clinic by the Becker family. Squirrel remembers Dr. Roth as having gentle hands and speaking quietly. Dr. Roth donates her time to fix Squirrel's broken Arm, spay her, and give her shots. She also gives Squirrel a clean bill of health before she is taken in by her new family.

=== Rachael ===
An employee at the vet clinic that Moon and Squirrel are brought to. Rachael helped nurse Squirrel back to health by taking her for walks and caring for her. She was sorry to be separated from Squirrel, after she was well enough to leave with the Becker family.

=== Becker family ===
Margery and Donald, and their mother and father, whose blue truck caused the injuries on the logging road. They spoke of several dogs they had owned, not seeming to be very emotionally attached to any of their 'summer dogs.' Squirrel found out how it feels to be lonely.

=== Susan McGrath ===
Mrs. Susan McGrath is old and lonely, but she understands dogs, and she is kind and talkative. She puts food and water out for Squirrel, who though starving and injured and cold, is still wary of human contact. By her understanding conversations and meeting of practical needs, Susan coaxes Squirrel into her home to warm up. Susan adopts Squirrel, teaches her how to be house-broken, gets her checked by the vet, and they become close companions. Susan and Squirrel do everything together from then on, shopping at the Pet Store, driving around town on errands, and live happily together in Susan's home until the end of the book. They become 'two old ladies' together. Susan renamed Squirrel “Addie”. Susan is an aging but competent, busy and intelligent woman. She knows the local vet by his first name. She resents people who try to make her into an invalid and belittle her solitary life.

=== The Stray Dogs ===
The stray dogs are dogs who find Moon and Squirrel in the streets and badly injure them.

=== Miss Oliver ===
She was trying to convince Susan McGrath to sell her house and get rid of Squirrel/Daisy/Addy.

== Reception ==
A Kirkus Reviews review says, "Heart-wrenching as well as heart-warming". A Publishers Weekly review says, "Though Martin is sometimes inconsistent about what Squirrel does and does not know, listeners will be too hooked on the emotional notes and occasional dramatic moments here to mind." This book won the Young Readers Choice Award in 2008. Nancy Tunis believes that the chapter titles for the last two chapters have been switched. Next-to-last should be "Home". Last chapter should be "Two Old Ladies". She says: "This book was recommended to me by my Grand-daughter. I think that by raising several dogs of her own, she has an inkling of what the thoughts of a dog might be, and she has found this book worthy."
