= Mother Didn't Tell Me =

1950 film by Claude Binyon

- Theatrical release poster
- Directed by: Claude Binyon
- Screenplay by: Claude Binyon
- Based on: The Doctor Wears Three Faces by Mary Bard
- Produced by: Fred Kohlmar
- Starring: Dorothy McGuire; William Lundigan; June Havoc; Gary Merrill; Jessie Royce Landis; Joyce MacKenzie; Leif Erickson
- Cinematography: Joseph LaShelle
- Edited by: Harmon Jones
- Music by: Cyril J. Mockridge
- Production company: Twentieth Century-Fox
- Distributed by: Twentieth Century-Fox
- Release date: March 3, 1950 (New York)
- Running time: 88 minutes
- Country: United States
- Language: English

Mother Didn't Tell Me is a 1950 American comedy film written and directed by Claude Binyon. It is based on the 1949 book The Doctor Wears Three Faces by Mary Bard. The film stars Dorothy McGuire, William Lundigan, June Havoc, Gary Merrill, Jessie Royce Landis and Joyce MacKenzie. It was released on March 3, 1950 by Twentieth Century-Fox.

== Plot ==
Advertising jingle writer Jane Morgan is treated for a cold by Dr. Bill Wright, and soon they date and fall in love. Jane is warned by Bill's mother and by another doctor's wife, Maggie, about the complications of being married to a doctor whose work often takes priority over his personal life.

Jane gives birth to twins, but her gradual frustration over Bill's absence is further irritated by his collaboration with Dr. Helen Porter, who is very attractive and makes Jane jealous. When she pretends to be ill in order to coax Bill into coming home, Jane is annoyed when Helen arrives to treat her instead.

Just as Jane is packed and preparing to leave her husband, their children are accidentally poisoned, but Bill is able to save them. Jane learns that Mrs. Wright, her mother-in-law, has persuaded Helen to take a job in another city.

== Cast ==
- Dorothy McGuire as Jane Morgan
- William Lundigan as Doctor William Wright
- June Havoc as Maggie Roberts
- Gary Merrill as Doctor Peter Roberts
- Jessie Royce Landis as Mrs. Wright
- Joyce MacKenzie as Helen Porter
- Leif Erickson as Dr. Bruce Gordon
- Archie Twitchell as Dr. Tod Morgan

== Reception ==
In a contemporary review for The New York Times, critic Bosley Crowther wrote: "Although the light-headed young lady whom Dorothy McGuire plays in 'Mother Didn't Tell Me' is not named Claudia, she bears a most striking resemblance to that persistently popular dame. She is frankly and winsomely designing. She has a stubbornly jealous streak. Her innocence is overwhelming. And she is blissfully irrational. Too darned irrational, if you ask us! The lady's just short of being a dope. And that is the irretrievable weakness of this new comedy ... Miss McGuire is compelled to play a lady whose perversities of wits are so absurd that the charms of her innocent nature are swamped in the backwash of her guff."
