= Main Street (novel series) =

Children's novel series by Ann M. Martin

- Author: Ann M. Martin
- Cover artist: Dan Andreason
- Language: English
- Genre: Fiction
- Publisher: Scholastic
- No. of books: 10 (List of books)
- Website: www.scholastic.com/mainstreet/

Main Street is a children's novel series by Ann M. Martin aiming at age group 8–12. It was published between 2007 and 2011. The story revolves around two sisters, Ruby and Flora Northrop, who move to the small town Camden Falls to live with their grandmother after the sudden death of their parents. There, they make new friends like Olivia and Nikki. Olivia's grandmother owns a store with Ruby's and Flora's grandmother.

After completing The Baby-Sitters Club series, Ann M. Martin began the Main Street series. She has stated in one of her interviews that she loves small towns and based Camden Falls on Woodstock, New York. The author's love of sewing inspired the grandmother's sewing shop. The books have at one point or another talked about almost everyone and all shops in the town. According to Martin, she had to create a whole new imaginary town which was very enjoyable. Each book has a detailed map of the town labeling each house and its owners.

== Novels ==
- Welcome to Camden Falls (2007): Ruby and Flora go to live with their maternal grandmother, Mindy Read, after their parents die in a car crash. On the way to get pizza on a frosty January evening, the family car collides with a truck. Ruby and Flora are taken to hospital where they learn their parents died. In Camden Falls they met Olivia Walter, an overachiever, and Nikki Sherman, an unlucky poor girl. Ruby and Flora do not like Camden Falls at first but eventually they come to appreciate their new home.
- Needle and Thread (2007): Flora is worried that Halloween, Thanksgiving, and Christmas are right around the corner and it will be the first time they are celebrating without their parents. Ruby is fitting right in at Camden Falls, getting a part in the children's chorus and the principal part in the play. Nikki's father creates even more trouble for her and does not allow her and Mae to go trick-or-treating with the others, who are dressed as characters from The Wizard of Oz. Flora, Ruby and Nikki also plan Olivia's dream 10th birthday party for her. Mrs. Mandel announces that she will be leaving at the end of Thanksgiving, and the students are devastated. Flora also discovers that Mary Woolsey is not that scary and that while digging through the past can be fun, it can also be hurtful.
- 'Tis the Season (2007): Flora and Ruby's first Christmas without their parents finally arrives. Nikki Sherman adopts a stray dog called Paw-Paw and finds a wonderful animal shelter, Sheltering Arms, which looks after stray dogs. Bill Willet dresses up as Santa Claus for the Shermans.
- Best Friends (2008): Flora Northrop is excited about the 350th anniversary of Camden Falls. Even better, Annika, her best friend from her old neighborhood, is coming to visit for the first time. However, her new best friend, Olivia, is worried that Flora will like Annika better than her, and that Flora will regret coming to Camden Falls. Flora writes a book about the history of the town and she is awarded a prize.
- The Secret Book Club (2008): It is summer time in Camden Falls, and Flora, Ruby, Olivia and Nikki are wondering what to do. An element of mystery is instantly added when they find books inexplicably left on their doorstep. Each comes with a mysterious message, asking them to read the book and do something new. Before they know it, the four friends have a secret girls-only book club. There are some very interesting ties between the books they are reading and the things they are facing over the summer. The girls find it annoying that their parents and Min know who the mystery book sender is but will not tell them. Still, they have a great time reading some pleasingly wonderful books like Roll of Thunder, Hear My Cry. To celebrate after reading the books, Min, the girls, and the book sender travel to Sands Point.
- September Surprises (2008); Camden Falls Middle merges with Camden Falls High. Flora, Nikki and Olivia enter the school, but Olivia worries about being the youngest kid. Bill and Mary Willet move into a nursing home due to Mary's worsening Alzheimer's.
- Keeping Secrets (2009): Flora and Ruby are sad that the Willets have moved out of the row houses. A new girl named Willow Hamilton moves into the Willets' former home. Willow does not seem to be interested in the new neighbourhood due to her mother acting extremely erratic. A few days later, Mrs. Hamilton has a major meltdown over a new rule involving doors and is sent to the hospital due to mental illness.
- Special Delivery (2009): Flora and Ruby's Aunt Allie has always wanted to have a baby, and now she is about to adopt one. A quiet neighborhood Thanksgiving becomes suddenly exciting as Flora and Ruby look forward to meeting their first ever cousin.
- Coming Apart (2010): Not long after Flora and Ruby moved into Camden Falls, Nikki Sherman's abusive father left her family. When that happened, she thought the screaming and fighting would be over, but Mr. Sherman is coming back one last time to get his things. Also, Rudy Pennington's dog Jacques dies of old age, and Ruby accidentally breaks a glass owl that used to belong to her mother.
- Staying Together (2011): Despite their very different personalities, Flora and Ruby have always gotten along before, but now they are fighting all the time and their friends are worried. Margaret shares her story of how she has always regretted arguing with her sister.

== Characters ==
=== Main characters ===
- Ruby Jane Northrop: The loud sister, aged 8 at the beginning at the series. Ruby wants to one day become an actress, and starred in a school play. Ruby loves to sing and dance. She takes tap, hip-hop and ballet. Ruby makes friends with almost everybody, and she is described as stubborn, adorable and annoying. Ruby often gets bad marks in school due to her habit of dreaming about auditions. She is a bit of a loudmouth, and is known to blabber. Ruby mostly hangs out with her sister's friends.
- Flora Marie Northrop: Flora is ten at the beginning of the book, and she is more emotionally affected by the accident than Ruby. She and her sister owns a tuxedo cat named King Comma, although it is seen that she spends more time with the cat. Flora loves to sew and, as remarked by Mary Woolsey, "has a way with words". This leads her to write a book which wins a prize in the 350th festivities. Flora is often described as smart, shy and sensitive. The author has said she regards Flora as the main "main character", although she has more fun writing about Ruby.
- Nicolette "Nikki" Sherman: An unlucky, poor girl who lives on the wrong side of town, a bit far from the row houses. Her father is an abusive alcoholic and her mother is almost never home. She and her siblings Mae and Tobias hate their father and are extremely afraid of him. Their house is described as small and rundown although not without signs of care. After Ruby and Flora move into Camden Falls, Nikki's father walks out on the family.
- Olivia Walter: An African American girl who lives next to Flora and Ruby, Olivia is the youngest in her grade. She is very smart and talented. Her hobbies include science and math. She is Flora's best friend. Her father loses his job, and then her parents start a family business called 'Sincerely Yours’, which is a basket shop. Her siblings include Henry and Jack, who are younger than her. Olivia's grandmother Evelyn ('Gigi'), co-owns Needle and Thread.

=== Row House residents ===
- Mindy Read: Flora and Ruby's practical grandmother. Called Min for short because when the sisters were younger whenever they asked for something, she always said "In a minute". She owns a sewing shop called Needle and Thread. Min has a Golden Retriever named Daisy Dear.
- The Morrises: An African American family and one of the most normal families. There are four children; Matthias and Lacey, who are twins, Travis and Alyssa.
- William "Bill" Willet: An old man dealing with his wife Mary's increasingly senile behavior with Alzheimer's. Eventually they move into the local nursing home and are replaced by a family with mental illness. The Willets were based on the author's parents.
- The Malones: A dentist who lives with his daughters Margaret and Lydia. Their mother died of a cerebral hemorrhage several years before Ruby and Flora went to live with their grandmother. Margaret is a nice college bound teenager while Lydia is a nasty girl in the wrong crowd.
- The Walters: Olivia's family consisting of herself, her younger brothers, parents and grandmother, Gigi. Later, Mr. Walter loses his job, and he and his wife begin their own business: Sincerely Yours, a basket shop.
- Rudy Pennington: A retired teacher who loses his beloved dog, Jacques, to old age later in the books. In the last novel, he is given a brown mutt named Variety.
- Robert "Robby" Edwards: The eldest child in the row houses. He has Down syndrome.
- The Fongs: A Chinese American couple who later have a baby daughter named Grace.

=== Other characters ===
- Evelyn "Gigi" Walter: Olivia's grandmother who works at Needle and Thread with Min.
- Mary Woolsey: Mary works at Needle and Thread doing the mending. There are wild rumors about her and Flora is scared of her at first. Later in the series Mary and Flora become good friends.
- The Hamiltons: A pair of shy siblings whose mother has a mental illness. They move from New Hampshire to the Willet's former house in the seventh book, Keeping Secrets. Every year, Mrs. Hamilton sets up strange rules, some of which are unnecessary, like tapping a vase multiple times. Eventually, she is institutionalized shortly after moving in. Several months later, she returns.
- Mae Sherman: Tobias and Nikki's younger sister who dislikes her father like her older siblings.
- Tobias Sherman: Nikki and Mae's much older brother who works part-time to make ends meet. Halfway through the books, he goes to college, the first Sherman to do so.
- Allie Read: Flora and Ruby's aunt who moves to Camden Falls and adopts a baby girl during the series.
