= Belle Teal =

2001 novel by Ann M. Martin

- First edition
- Author: Ann M. Martin
- Language: English
- Genre: Children novel
- Publisher: Scholastic
- Publication date: 2001
- Publication place: United States
- Media type: Print (hardback & paperback)
- OCLC: 50871913

Belle Teal is a novel written by Ann M. Martin in 2001.

== Plot summary ==
The novel tells the story of Belle Teal Harper, her mother Adele, her grandmother Belle Teal Rhodes, and their friends and community. It details Bell Teal's fifth grade year, including her friendship with a new Black classmate, whom she introduces to her best friend, who is also white.

The book deals with many difficult aspects of growing up; Belle Teal encounters racism, death, abuse, bullying, and other harsh realities of adulthood. She also begins to learn that not all adults are saints and that one cannot always depend on them, regardless of how desperate or alone you are. However, Belle Teal proves to be a strong, powerful young woman, with a deep sense of right and wrong and the strength to fight for what she believes in. Her story is woven with the love and support of friends and family; it illustrates the bonds between us and encourages us to be courageous and heartfelt and earnest and true—and to make the best of what we are given. She is taught to stand up for herself and others.
