= Missing Since Monday =

1986 novel by Ann M. Martin

- First edition
- Author: Ann M. Martin
- Cover artist: S. Mancusi
- Language: English
- Genre: Mystery fiction
- Set in: Princeton, New Jersey
- Publisher: Holiday House
- Publication date: January 1, 1986
- Publication place: United States
- Media type: Print
- Pages: 167
- ISBN: 978-0-8234-0626-5
- OCLC: 13524486
- Dewey Decimal: 813.54

Missing Since Monday is a book written by Ann M. Martin in 1986. The story focuses on fifteen-year-old Maggie Ellis, the disappearance of her four-year-old sister Courtenay, and the subsequent effort to find the young girl.

== Characters ==
- Maggie Ellis: Maggie is the sister of Courtenay and Michael Ellis and is the child of separated parents Owen and Jessica Ellis. She has long, straight red hair and looks a lot like her mother. She lives with her father and she has been lied to that her mother just cannot stay in one place for long. It was Maggie's turn to get Courtenay from her bus the day Courtenay is kidnapped.
- Courtenay Ellis: Courtenay is four years old and attends kindergarten. She looks like her father, (Owen) and her mother Leigh, having straight brown hair and Brown eyes. She is kidnapped when her siblings Maggie and Michael are taking care of her. Is the kidnapper going to come for Maggie too?

== Reception ==
Kirkus Reviews calls it "A fast-moving cautionary tale about kidnapping" and concludes "...enough suspense to hold readers." Publishers Weekly described the book as "tense, gripping fare right up to the finale".
