= Ann M. Martin =

American writer of children's literature

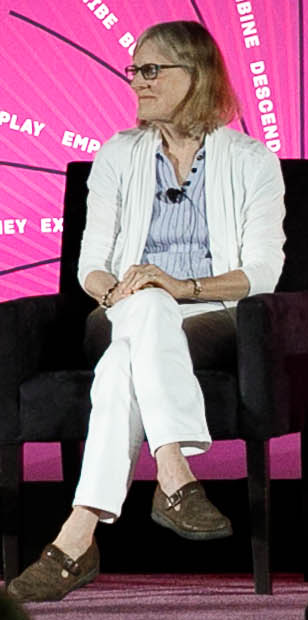
- Ann M. Martin at the 2019 National Book Awards
- Born: Ann Matthews Martin; August 12, 1955 (age 71); Princeton, New Jersey, U.S.
- Education: Smith College
- Occupation: Writer
- Writing career
- Language: English
- Genres: Children's books and young adult fiction
- Subject: English
- Notable work: The Baby-Sitters Club series (1986–2000, 2010, 2026)
- Notable awards: Newbery Honor (a Newbery Medal runner-up) Josette Frank Award (winner)
- Website: scholastic.com/annmartin/

Signature
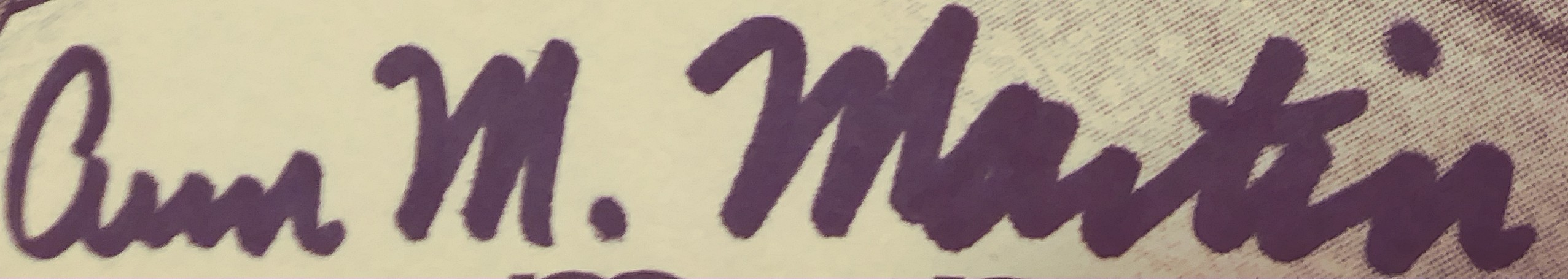

Ann Matthews Martin (born August 12, 1955) is an American writer of children's and young adult fiction, known best for The Baby-Sitters Club series which was first published in 1986. A graduate of Smith College, Martin's works have sold millions of copies worldwide; today, Martin continues involvement with The Baby-Sitters Club series and spin-offs alongside writing other novels.

== Early life ==
Ann Matthews Martin grew up in Princeton, New Jersey. Her mother, Eden Martin, was a preschool teacher and her father, Henry Martin, was a cartoonist for The New Yorker and other publications. Her mother's ancestry can be traced back to the pilgrims who traveled on the Mayflower in 1620. She has a younger sister, Jane.

Martin developed an interest in writing from an early age. Before she was old enough to write, she would dictate stories to her mother to write down for her. Some of her favorite authors at that time were Lewis Carroll, P. L. Travers, Hugh Lofting, Astrid Lindgren, and Roald Dahl. Martin loved creative writing in elementary school and discovered her passion for writing in second grade. She began writing short stories, and her fourth-grade teacher wrote on her student folder that she would make a wonderful writer because she spent so much of her free time writing in notebooks. Her favorite subjects in middle school and high school were English and French, and her least favorite was math.

As a teen, Martin loved working with children and decided to become a teacher. She wanted to help children with disabilities, so she worked during the summer at the Eden Institute, a school for autistic children in her hometown.

After graduating from Princeton High School in 1973, Martin attended Smith College from 1973 to 1977. She studied early-childhood education and child psychology. Her senior thesis was on the use of children's literature in the classroom. She lived in Gardiner House and wrote for Smith College newspaper, The Sophian. Describing her Smith education, Martin said “it was an environment of strong, independent women, both the students and the professors.” Her time at Smith influenced her identity as a feminist and inspired her to portray female characters who were like the women she knew in her own life.

== Career ==
After graduating from Smith College, Martin taught in a split fourth and fifth-grade classroom at Plumfield School in Noroton, Connecticut. Her students, ages 8–13, struggled with learning disabilities including dyslexia and autism. Martin has said that her work with special needs children influenced her writing.

After teaching for a year, Martin decided to pursue publishing. She worked her way up from an editorial assistant to a senior editor, and she worked for several well-known children's book publishers, including Pocket Books and Scholastic. She is now a full-time writer.

In 1983, Martin published her first book, Bummer Summer, which earned the Children's Choice Award in 1985. She began writing The Baby-Sitters Club series in 1985 while working for Scholastic as a children's book editor. After Martin wrote the first 35 novels in The Baby-Sitters Club series, Scholastic hired ghostwriters to continue the series. In 2010, Martin published a prequel to The Baby-Sitters Club series titled The Summer Before.

She now concentrates on writing single novels, many of which are set in the 1960s. One of those novels, A Corner of the Universe, won a Newbery Honor in 2003. In 2015, Martin won the Josette Frank Award from the Children's Book Committee of Bank Street College of Education for Rain Reign (she shared the award with I'll Give You the Sun by Jandy Nelson). The committee listed the book as a Best Children's Book of the Year with Outstanding Merit; additional books by Martin that have appeared on this list include A Corner of the Universe, Here Today, Friends, A Dog's Life, Ten Good and Bad Things About My Life (So Far), and Better to Wish.

Martin draws her ideas from various sources, with some books inspired by personal experiences or childhood memories, and some about contemporary problems and struggles. Though her characters are all fictional, some are based on real people or named after people Martin knows.

In 1990, Martin and her colleagues founded "The Lisa Libraries" to honor and memorialize their friend Lisa Novak. This non-profit organization distributes new books to children and establishes libraries in under-served areas. In the same year, Martin also founded the Ann M. Martin Foundation, which provides financial support for art, education, and literacy programs in addition to programs for abused and stray animals.

Martin served as a producer for the 2020 Netflix adaptation of The Baby-Sitters Club.

== Personal life ==
Martin maintains a quiet public profile. She lived in New York City for many years before moving upstate to the Hudson Valley where she enjoys nature, sewing, and fostering kittens. She posts updates on social media, including on her public Facebook page. Martin continues to make author appearances and oversee adaptations of her works, including graphic novels and network series adaptions of The Baby-Sitters Club.

In 2016, Martin disclosed that she had previously been in a relationship with Laura Godwin, with whom she wrote the four books in The Doll People series.

== Works ==
Standalone novels

- Bummer Summer (1983)
- Inside Out (1984)
- Missing Since Monday (1986)
- With and Without You (1986)
- Just a Summer Romance (1987)
- Slam Book (1987)
- Yours Turly, Shirley (1988)
- Ma and Pa Dracula (1989)
- Belle Teal (2001)
- A Corner of the Universe (2002)
- On Christmas Eve (2006)
- Rain Reign (2014)

Novels and sequels

- Stage Fright (1984)
- Me and Katie (The Pest) (1985)
- Ten Kids, No Pets (1988)
- Eleven Kids, One Summer (1991)
- P.S. Longer Letter Later (1998), by Martin and Paula Danziger
- Snail Mail No More (1999), Martin and Danziger
- A Dog's Life: The Autobiography of a Stray (2005)
- Everything for a Dog (2009)
- Ten Rules for Living with My Sister (2011)
- Ten Good and Bad Things About My Life (So Far) (2012)

Picture books

- Rachel Parker, Kindergarten Showoff (1992) with illustrations by Nancy Poydar
- Leo The Magnificat (1996) with illustrations by Emily Arnold McCully

Short stories

- 8 x 2 = Sweet Sixteen, a short story featuring Karen Brewer included in the children's anthology It's Great to Be Eight (2000)
- The Lost Art of Letter Writing, a short story included in the young adult anthology What You Wish For (2011)

Other works

- Because of Shoe and Other Dog Stories (edited) (2012)

Series

- The Baby-Sitters Club (1986–1990, 2010, and 2026) 35 volumes to 1990, continued by other writers with Martin, 2026 novel written in collaboration with other authors
- The Baby-Sitters Little Sister (1988 to 2000)
- The Kids in Ms. Colman's Class (1995 to 1998) 12 volumes
- California Diaries (1997 to 2000) 15 volumes
- Main Street (2007 to 2011)
  1. Welcome to Camden Falls (2007)
  2. Needle and Thread (2007)
  3. 'Tis the Season (2007)
  4. Best Friends (2008)
  5. The Secret Book Club (2008)
  6. September Surprises (2008)
  7. Keeping Secrets (2009)
  8. Special Delivery (2009)
  9. Coming Apart (2010)
  10. Staying Together (2011)
- The Doll People (2000 to 2014) – by Martin and Laura Godwin, illustrated by Brian Selznick
  1. The Doll People (2000)
  2. The Meanest Doll in the World (2003)
  3. The Runaway Dolls (2008)
  4. The Doll People Set Sail (2014)
- Family Tree (2013-2014)
  1. Better to Wish (2013)
  2. The Long Way Home (2013)
  3. Best Kept Secret (2014)
  4. Home Is the Place (2014)
- Missy Piggle-Wiggle (2016 to 2018) – by Martin and Annie Parnell, great-granddaughter of Betty MacDonald, who created Mrs. Piggle-Wiggle in 1947; illustrated by Ben Hatke.
  1. Missy Piggle-Wiggle and the Whatever Cure (2016)
  2. Missy Piggle-Wiggle and the Won't-Walk-the-Dog Cure (2017)
  3. Missy Piggle-Wiggle and the Sticky-Fingers Cure (2018)
