= Here Today (novel) =

2004 novel by Ann M. Martin

- First edition
- Author: Ann M. Martin
- Language: English
- Genre: Children novel
- Publisher: Scholastic
- Publication date: 2004
- Publication place: United States
- Media type: Print (Hardback & Paperback)
- ISBN: 978-0-439-57944-5
- OCLC: 54500737

Here Today is a children's novel by Ann M. Martin. It was first published in 2004 and takes place in the 1960s. The story is about Ellie, an 11-year-old whose mother is irresponsible and whose siblings are argumentative. She, along with her best friend Holly, gets bullied and treated like she does not exist.

== Plot summary ==
Eleanor Roosevelt Dingman (Ellie) is an 11-year-old girl who lives on Witch Tree Lane, in Spectacle, New York. Along with the other people who live on the street, she is hated by the other children in school. Holly and Ellie have been given a hard time by the popular girls in their school (the Sparrows), but since the recent death of the late president John F. Kennedy, it has temporarily stopped. Ellie's life is turned upside down when her mother, the self-proclaimed "Doris Day" Dingman, decides to go into show business. Overcome with grief for the newly widowed mother, Jackie Kennedy, Doris realizes that life is short; she goes to New York to "become established" and leaves her children and husband to fend for themselves.

Ellie discovers she has more power than she thinks and can change her life no matter what the situation. Doris's move to New York forces Ellie to take care of her family and deal with the absence of her already distant mother and a father who, though hard working and loving, is often absent. When Doris decides to move to Hollywood, Ellie has finally had enough. Ellie's father finds a better job with more pay and better hours, allowing him to spend more time with Ellie and her siblings.
