= The Meanest Doll in the World =

Book by Ann M. Martin

- Author: Ann M. Martin, Laura Godwin
- Illustrator: Brian Selznick
- Language: English
- Genre: Children's novel
- Publisher: Hyperion Paperbooks for Children
- Publication date: 1 September 2003
- Publication place: United States
- Media type: Print (Hardcover)
- Pages: 288
- ISBN: 0-7868-0878-0
- OCLC: 51879074
- Preceded by: The Doll People
- Followed by: The Runaway Dolls

The Meanest Doll in the World is a children's novel written by Ann M. Martin and Laura Godwin and illustrated by Brian Selznick. It was first published in 2003 as the second entry in The Doll People series. This book is intended for children from ages 8–12.

== Plot summary ==
The novel revisits The Doll People protagonists Annabelle Doll and Tiffany Funcraft as they get into trouble trying to hide from their owner, Kate Palmer. They hide in her backpack and get taken to school. There, they explore and eventually get into a backpack they think is Kate's. It turns out it is really the backpack of a different child, named BJ. The dolls are taken to BJ's house where they meet Waterfall, Melody, Yvonne, Penny, and Beth, the toys of BJ's sister. The dolls there are being terrorized by a doll named Princess Mimi (called by the toys Mean Mimi). Mean Mimi tries to boss them around too, but Annabelle and Tiffany escape back into BJ's backpack. They plan to return to school and get back into Kate's backpack and then home to their worried families. They are unaware that Mean Mimi has followed them.

At the Palmers' house, Mimi pretends to cry and tricks the Dolls and the Funcrafts into letting her stay with them. What they do not know is that Mimi is trying to torture them, too. Mimi tries to wake up Kate so she will know about the mess she made and blame the Annabelle and Tiffany. Nora, Kate's little sister, sees Mean Mimi jump off Kate's bookshelf in a stunt to expose the life of the other dolls. Due to this, Mimi goes into Permanent Doll State, which causes dolls to be unable to return to life due to their risk to all dollkind. The story concludes with Mean Mimi, still in Permanent Doll State, being taken back to Kate's school where she ends up in the lost and found.
