= Sidewalks of New York =

Sidewalks of New York may refer to:

- Sidewalks of New York (1923 film), a 1923 silent film directed by Lester Park
- Sidewalks of New York (1931 film), a 1931 film starring Buster Keaton
- Sidewalks of New York (2001 film), a 2001 film written and directed by Edward Burns
- "The Sidewalks of New York", an 1894 popular song about life in New York City
- The Sidewalks of New York (cartoon), two short cartoons using the song, one released in 1925 and a re-release in 1929
