= Betty MacDonald =

American writer

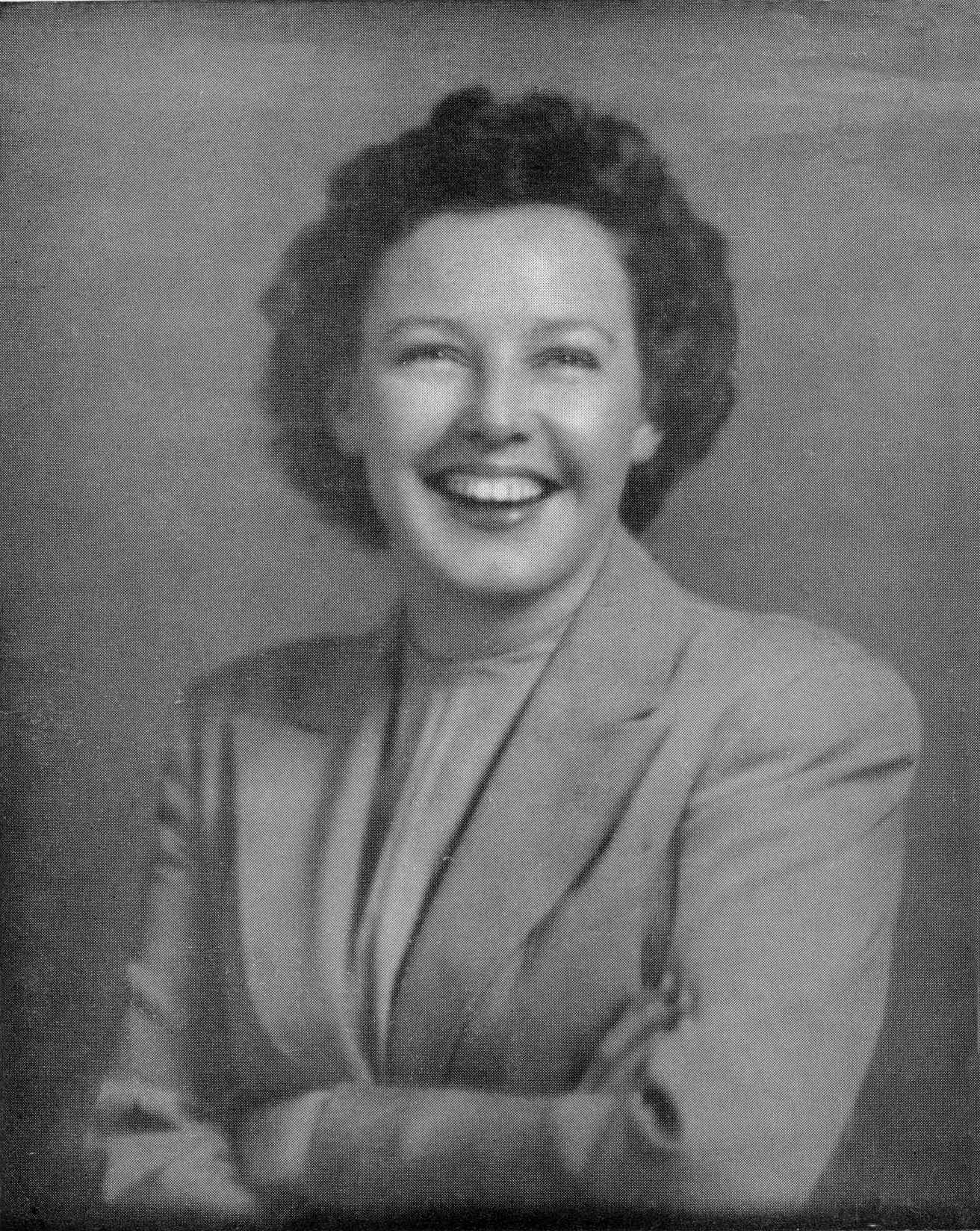
- MacDonald in 1945
- Born: Anne Elizabeth Campbell Bard; March 26, 1907; Boulder, Colorado, U.S.
- Died: February 7, 1958 (aged 50); Seattle, Washington, U.S.
- Occupation: Writer
- Spouses: Robert Eugene Heskett (m. 1927; div. 1931) Donald C. MacDonald (m. 1942)
- Children: 2
- Relatives: Mary Bard (sister)
- Writing career
- Genres: Autobiography, Children's literature
- Notable works: The Egg and I; Mrs. Piggle-Wiggle series

Betty MacDonald (born Anne Elizabeth Campbell Bard; March 26, 1907 – February 7, 1958) was an American author who specialized in humorous autobiographical tales, and is best known for her book The Egg and I. She also wrote the Mrs. Piggle-Wiggle series of children's books. She is associated with the Pacific Northwest, especially Washington.

Betty MacDonald in the Roosevelt High School Seattle yearbook, 1924

== Life and work ==
MacDonald was born in Boulder, Colorado. Her official birth date is given as March 26, 1908, although federal census returns seem to indicate 1907. Her parents were Harvard-educated mining engineer Darsie Bard and his wife Elsie Sanderson, called Sydney. Betty had three sisters: Mary Bard, Dorothea Bard, and Alison Bard; and one brother, Sydney Cleveland Bard. In adulthood, MacDonald's sister Mary Bard (Jensen) was also a published author. (Another sister, Sylvia, died in infancy.) Betty Bard spent her childhood in Mexico, Montana, and Idaho.

Her family moved to the north slope of Seattle's Capitol Hill neighborhood in 1918, moving to the Laurelhurst neighborhood a year later and finally settling in the Roosevelt neighborhood in 1922, where she graduated from Roosevelt High School in 1924.

MacDonald attended the University of Washington for one year before she married Robert Eugene Heskett (1895–1951) at age 20 in July 1927; they lived on a chicken farm in the Olympic Peninsula's Chimacum Valley, near Center and a few miles south of Port Townsend. She left Heskett in 1931 and filed for divorce. Upon returning to Seattle, she worked at a variety of jobs to support their daughters Anne and Joan. After the divorce the ex-spouses had virtually no contact. Heskett died in 1951 after being “stabbed in a fight.” She spent nine months at Firland Sanatorium near Seattle in 1937–1938 for treatment of tuberculosis. On April 24, 1942, she married Donald C. MacDonald (1910–1975) and moved to Vashon Island, where she wrote most of her books.

MacDonald rose to fame when her first book, The Egg and I, was published in 1945. It first appeared as a serialized abridgement in the June through August 1945, issues of The Atlantic. The book, published on October 3, 1945, was number one on The New York Times non-fiction bestseller list for 43 weeks International Pictures bought the movie rights for $100,000 in 1946. NBC broadcast a television adaptation of the book in 1951-1952.

In the film of The Egg and I, made in 1947, MacDonald was played by Claudette Colbert. Her husband (simply called "Bob" in the book) was called "Bob MacDonald" in the film, as studio executives were keen not to raise the matter of MacDonald's divorce in the public consciousness. He was played by Fred MacMurray. The books introduced the characters Ma and Pa Kettle, who also were featured in the movie version of The Egg and I. The characters become so popular a series of nine more films were made featuring them.

MacDonald also published three other semi-autobiographical books:

- The Plague and I (1948), describing her nine-month stay at the Firlands tuberculosis sanitarium; the character of Kimi is the writer Monica Sone. MacDonald helped launch Sone’s writing career and appears as “Chris” in Sone’s book Nisei Daughter. Plague was said to be MacDonald’s favorite of her own books. The New York Times reviewer said of Plague: “Betty MacDonald…apparently can extract more amusement out of a nasty experience than most people can corral out from a trip to the circus…the artistry of her style, the infectious gaiety of her perspective, and the sensitive understanding she extends to any person she comes in contact with…assures a good deal of pleasure and vital knowledge even though as a subject the plague’s the thing.” In 1984 a different New York Times writer called it “undeservedly forgotten.”
- Anybody Can Do Anything (1950), recounting her life in the Depression trying to find work, in the years after she left her husband and moved back in with her mother and sister; this book is notable as “an explicit appreciation of a western place” (Seattle in the 1930s.) Betty, who can’t type or do shorthand, “hires out as a secretary and a stenographer…and hunts in the poverty-stricken thirties for other jobs, some of which she applies [for] and some of which she tries: Tinting photos, clerking for florist, dentist, gangster, credit bureau, and a dime-card chain scheme.”
- Onions in the Stew (1955), about her life in a log cabin by the ferry landing on Vashon Island with her second husband and teenage daughters during the war years. The farm, which has a “breathtaking view of Puget Sound, lush fruit trees and bald eagles nesting just outside the windows,” is now a bed and breakfast with a small museum dedicated to MacDonald.

She also wrote the Mrs. Piggle-Wiggle series of children's books and another children's book, Nancy and Plum, which was described upon publication as being “steeped in the essence of old fairy tales.”

The MacDonalds moved to California's Carmel Valley in 1956. MacDonald returned to Seattle in September 1957 for cancer treatment and died there of uterine cancer on February 7, 1958.

A posthumous collection of her writings, entitled Who, Me?: The Autobiography of Betty MacDonald, was later released.

All the Bard siblings are deceased. MacDonald's younger daughter, Joan MacDonald Keil, died in July 2005.

== Legacy ==
MacDonald has been described as “one of the most accomplished and popular humorists of the era.”

In 2007, MacDonald's daughter, Anne MacDonald Canham, published Happy Birthday, Mrs. Piggle-Wiggle, based on stories and characters created by her mother. The book is attributed to both mother and daughter.

On March 13, 2008, BBC Radio 4 broadcast a tribute program, commemorating the 100th anniversary of McDonald's birth. In 2009, BBC Radio 4 also broadcast a reading of MacDonald's book, Anybody Can Do Anything.

In September 2016, Annie Parnell, MacDonald's great-granddaughter, published a follow-up to the series, Missy Piggle-Wiggle and the Whatever Cure in conjunction with Ann M. Martin, with illustrations by Ben Hatke.

The Egg & I and the Mrs. Piggle-Wiggle books are still in print from Harper & Row; her other three memoir books have been republished multiple times, most recently by University of Washington Press. Nancy and Plum was reprinted by MacDonald’s daughter Joan and son-in-law in 1998. A new edition with illustrations by Mary GrandPré has since been issued by Yearling.

First have a big mortgage, then lots of coffee.

— Betty MacDonald’s advice to aspiring writers

== Published works ==
Mrs. Piggle-Wiggle

- 1947 Mrs. Piggle-Wiggle (first edition illustrated by Richard Bennett, subsequent editions by Hilary Knight)
- 1949 Mrs. Piggle-Wiggle's Magic (illustrated by Hilary Knight)
- 1954 Mrs. Piggle-Wiggle's Farm (illustrated by Maurice Sendak)
- 1957 Hello, Mrs. Piggle-Wiggle (illustrated by Hilary Knight)
- 2007 Happy Birthday, Mrs. Piggle-Wiggle (a final Piggle-Wiggle collection finished by her daughter Anne and published posthumously)

Other

- 1945 The Egg and I
- 1948 The Plague and I
- 1950 Anybody Can Do Anything
- 1952 Nancy and Plum
- 1955 Onions in the Stew
- 1959 Who, Me? The Autobiography of Betty MacDonald (a collection of selected chapters from her four adult books, credited posthumously as Betty Bard MacDonald)
