= Stranger with My Face =

1981 American young adult horror novel by Lois Duncan

- First edition cover
- Author: Lois Duncan
- Cover artist: Gary Watson
- Language: English
- Genre: Horror, young adult literature
- Publisher: Little, Brown
- Publication date: October 1981
- Publication place: United States
- Media type: Print (hardcover & paperback)
- Pages: 250 (first edition)
- ISBN: 0-316-19551-0 (first edition)
- OCLC: 7577236
- LC Class: PZ7.D9117 St

Stranger with My Face is a young adult horror novel by Lois Duncan, first published in 1981. The novel is about the Native American Laurie Stratton, who is seen by others in places which she knows she could not be. She discovers that she has an identical twin sister named Lia who has been visiting her town using astral projection, which involves sending her soul outside her body. Laurie learns astral projection and uses it to look for her sister. During this time, Lia's spirit takes control of Laurie's body. The story describes Laurie's struggle to take back control of her body. The novel explores themes of appearance versus true self and the idea of a double, someone similar but not quite the same as someone else. Duncan got the idea for the book after hearing about the concept of astral projection, which she thought would make a great plot for a novel. In 2011, the novel was updated with text to modernize the content.

Stranger with My Face received several awards and honours, being named a New York Times Notable Book of the Year and American Library Association Best Book for Young Adults in 1981. It was adapted into the television film of the same name starring Alexz Johnson, Catherine Hicks, Andrew Francis, and Emily Hirst. The film aired in 2009 on the Lifetime Movie Network. The Stranger with My Face International Film Festival in Hobart, Australia, is named after the novel.

== Plot ==
Seventeen-year-old Laurie Stratton, a Native American adopted by the Strattons when she was very young, is seen by friends and family members in places where she knows she was not. After her adoptive sister Megan sees a spirit who looks like Laurie, Megan calls the spirit Laurie's "ghosty". The spirit contacts Laurie and identifies herself as Lia, her twin sister. Helen Tuttle, Laurie's friend, suggests that Lia was using astral projection, which involves sending the soul outside the body to travel elsewhere in the universe. Helen, however, has suspicions that Lia is not benevolent, and while returning home one day is seriously injured while chasing Lia's spirit. Helen's father brings Laurie a Christmas present that Helen had prepared before the injury: a necklace with a lavender eagle hanging off of it that is said to protect the wearer from evil spirits.

On Christmas Eve, Laurie's friend Jeff Rankin plans to bring over books regarding astral projection that Helen had bought for her. On the rocks in front of Laurie's house, Jeff sees someone who looks like Laurie waving him towards her. As he approaches her, Jeff falls into a cavern below, breaking his leg. Laurie notices the books on the rocks the next day and also falls into the cavern while searching for Jeff. Having practiced projecting but not accomplishing it, Laurie successfully uses astral projection to lift her spirit up to the rocks in front of her house. Neal, Laurie's adoptive brother, sees her spirit disappear while on top of the rocks. Assuming that Laurie fell, he notifies their father, who finds Laurie and Jeff in the cavern. During Jeff's hospital stay afterwards, the necklace was found caught in the zipper of his parka. Jeff sees that the clasp of the necklace is broken, and decides to fix the clasp before giving it back to Laurie.

Laurie becomes more skillful with projecting, and decides to search out her sister. She projects herself to Lia's location, where she finds Lia's sleeping body. Looking around, she finds herself in a mental hospital and hears nurses talking about unusual circumstances involving Lia and her previous adoptive family. Somehow, without ever touching her, Lia had forced her adoptive sister Katherine Abbott off a cliff while they were riding horses, which caused Katherine to fall to her death. Disheartened at this revelation, Laurie's spirit returns to her house, but is unable to re-enter her body. While trying to push back into it, her body's eyes open, and she learns that Lia, who she thought was sleeping, has taken control of her body. While everyone else seems to be fooled by Lia, Megan becomes suspicious that Laurie is not in control of her body after she displays uncharacteristic behaviors such as eating white meat, making rude comments about others, and ignoring her old friends Jeff and Helen for new ones. Laurie can only watch helplessly as Lia does all of this.

Lia taunts Laurie, saying she can feel her there and that she can feel Laurie's body pulling Laurie's spirit back in. She then tells her that their biological mother was an adept astral projector, but one day projected herself outward and never came back. Lia and Laurie were taken and separated. While Laurie stayed with one family, the Strattons, Lia was shuffled from family to family due to strange occurrences with the families and their biological children. For instance, she had killed Katherine Abbott to take her place in their will so that Lia would be their only heir.

Megan tells Jeff about her suspicions that Laurie is not in control of her body. When Megan and Jeff meet with Lia, Jeff quickly determines that someone else is in control of Laurie's body, so he tries to give Lia the necklace he fixed because he heard it protects against evil spirits. Lia forces the necklace out of his hand, but Megan retrieves the necklace and throws it at Laurie's body, catching her across the throat. Lia's spirit is ejected from Laurie's body, putting Laurie back in control. With Lia's spirit having been gone for so long from her body at the hospital, she was declared dead and cremated. To prevent Lia from regaining control, Laurie never projects herself again, as she still feels Lia's presence.

== Background and publication history ==
Stranger with My Face was first published in October 1981 by Little, Brown, and Company in hardcover. Duncan was intrigued by the idea of astral projection after hearing of it, and she felt it would make a great plot for a novel. Duncan talked with people who said they experienced astral projection and did library research on the topic, which helped her write some of the descriptions of astral projection in the novel. The novel takes place on a fictional island off the coast of New England. Duncan had been on Nantucket Island one summer and was interested in the seasonal changes of such an island. A cousin living in Rhode Island provided this information to Duncan, who incorporated some of these details in the book.

The characters of Megan and Neal were based on Duncan's children Kaitlyn and Don Junior. The author also incorporated details from her own life in Stranger with My Face. An actress that Laurie's adoptive mother mentions in the first edition of the novel is Kerry Arquette, the name of one of Duncan's daughters. (Note: In the 2011 revised edition of the novel, Duncan changed the name being mentioned to Brittany Mahrer.) In the book, Helen is transferred to Duke University Hospital, where Duncan had taken her oldest daughter for an operation.

In 2011, Little, Brown reissued the novel with changes to modernize the content. Stranger with My Face, along with Down a Dark Hall and Summer of Fear, were the second group of 10 novels by Duncan to be updated. Duncan introduced cell phones in the revised edition, which posed a problem because she says that a "strong element of many of my plots is having the protagonist be in a dangerous situation and not being able to reach the outside world". Since characters could use a cell phone to call for help, she had to find a way to prevent characters from using their cell phones to contact one another.

An audiobook version of the novel was released by Listening Library in 1986, and another, narrated by Alyssa Bresnahan, was released by Recorded Books in 1998. The Stranger with My Face International Film Festival, based in Hobart, Australia, takes its name from the novel. The film festival showcases work from female directors and explores women's perspectives regarding genre film, focusing on horror in particular.

== Major themes ==
Megan Abbott, a writer of crime novels, states that the book explores the idea of a double, a people similar but not quite the same as someone else. She adds that the novel features a female protagonist who has to confront a second woman who does "some of the things the heroine would be afraid to do." Abbott says that Laurie starts to make positive changes in her life, such as splitting up with her "spoiled boyfriend and his mean clique", after she meets her double. Lizzie Skurnick writes in Shelf Discovery that Stranger with My Face explores the theme of appearance versus true self. She points to a scene in which Laurie has projected herself to the mental hospital Lia is staying in, where Laurie notices slight differences in appearance between the two. Deborah Wilson Overstreet says in The ALAN Review that the novel expresses the idea that women in distress are interesting. In the book, Laurie splits up with her boyfriend and dates a boy who had half of his face burned off in an explosion after meeting Lia.

== Reception ==
Stranger with My Face has won several awards and honors. In 1981, it was named the American Library Association Best Book for Young Adults and a New York Times Notable Book of the Year. Staff at the University of Iowa selected the novel in the following year's Books for Young Adults list based on the reading interests of the Iowa high school students surveyed. The staff stated that readers were captivated by the idea of astral projection, they "loved the story's fast pace", and they saw bigger themes in Stranger in My Face. The story won four state awards: the Massachusetts Children's Book Award, the California Young Reader Medal in the Young Adult category, the South Carolina Young Adult Book Award, and the Young Hoosier Book Award in the grade 6–8 category.

Lois Duncan stated in 2009 that Stranger with My Face, along with Locked in Time, were the favorite young adult fiction novels she wrote. A reviewer from Kirkus Reviews called it "professionally orchestrated suspense for the willingly susceptible." Jean Fritz, writing for The New York Times, thought the "story is both spine-chilling and perfectly reasonable as Lois Duncan tells it." Common Sense Media's Norah Caroline Piehl rated the novel three stars out of five, stating that "Duncan makes out-of-body travel seem so commonplace that even the most literal-minded readers might lose some of their skepticism." She felt that though Laurie tells the story when she is seventeen, 'her voice often sounds more middle-age than teenage—she repeatedly refers to her younger siblings as "the children," for example.' Barbara Baskin and Karen Harris write in the book More Notes from a Different Drummer that '[s]uch standard occult ingredients as twins separated at birth and supernatural practices of "exotic" cultures combine with a lightweight teen romance to produce this facile work.'

== Adaptation ==
Filming for a television film adaptation of the same name began on February 6, 2009, in Victoria, British Columbia, Canada. The film aired on August 29, 2009, on the Lifetime Movie Network. It starred Alexz Johnson as Laurie and Lia, Catherine Hicks as Laurie's adoptive mother Shelley Stratton, Andrew Francis as Jeff, and Emily Hirst as Laurie's adoptive sister Alexis, and was directed by Jeff Renfroe. Sloan Freer from Radio Times rated the film two stars out of five, stating that "director Jeff Renfroe relies excessively on the soundtrack and shadowy visuals to pepper the early scenes with fake jolts, and manufacture an overall atmosphere of unease." He felt the only realism from the movie "comes from Johnson's emotionally subtle double performance, which holds the feature together, even in the weak final act."
