= A Gift of Magic =

1971 young adult supernatural novel by Lois Duncan

- First edition cover
- Author: Lois Duncan
- Illustrator: Arvis Stewart
- Language: English
- Genre: Supernatural fiction, young adult literature
- Publisher: Little, Brown
- Publication date: September 23, 1971
- Publication place: United States
- Media type: Print (hardcover & paperback)
- Pages: 183 (first edition)
- ISBN: 0-316-19545-6 (first edition)
- OCLC: 214877
- LC Class: PZ7.D9117 Gh

A Gift of Magic is a 1971 novel by Lois Duncan about a grandmother who gives her grandchildren distinct gifts. Brendon is given the gift of music, Kirby is given the gift of dance, and Nancy is given the gift of magic. Nancy's gift gives her extrasensory perception (ESP), which allows her to sense events that are happening in places she is not physically present and to read other people's minds. The novel explores some of the benefits, problems and responsibilities Nancy's gift gives her.

Duncan based the ESP elements of the story on experiments that were conducted on her by J. B. Rhine, who investigated ESP. The characters of Brendon, Kirby, and Nancy were based on the three children she had when first writing the book. In 2012, an updated version of the novel was published with changes to modernize the content, as well as changes to the name and ages to some of the characters. Critical reception for the book was positive, with reviewers particularly liking how Duncan integrated Nancy's gift of magic into the story.

== Plot ==
Before she dies, a woman gives her grandchildren three separate gifts: Brendon is given the gift of music, Kirby is given the gift of dance, and Nancy is given the gift of magic. Nancy can use that gift to sense events that are happening in places she is not physically present and to tell what others are thinking. Many years later, the children are staying with their mother Elizabeth at their Florida home. Elizabeth tells them that she is getting divorced from their father. Nancy is upset by this and is unhappy to see her mother getting closer to Tom Duncan, Elizabeth's first boyfriend and the counsellor at the high school Nancy and Kirby attend.

In her social studies class, Nancy is given a pop quiz. The teacher Ms. Green reads the questions out loud, and Nancy answers questions that Ms. Green has not yet asked. Ms. Green accuses her of getting the questions from her sister, who took the pop quiz before lunch that day. Ms. Green arranges for both of them to meet her in the counsellor's office after school. While there, Kirby tells Mr. Duncan that she had been thinking of the questions on the quiz while they were sitting together during lunch and implies that Nancy read her mind. Mr. Duncan believes that Nancy might have extrasensory perception (ESP) to explain her ability to read people's minds.

He tells Dr. Russo, a psychiatrist who has done experiments regarding ESP, about this. Dr. Russo gives her a test where she has to identify cards with their back facing her, and she intentionally guesses the cards incorrectly because she does not want people finding out about her gift. She guesses the cards with the red suit as black and cards with the black suit as red, which further confirms Mr. Duncan's suspicions due to the very low likelihood of doing this by chance alone.

Kirby takes dance lessons at a local studio and aspires to be a professional dancer. Her dancing career is threatened when she breaks her leg while falling down a stairway and is unable to move the toes in that leg due to a damaged nerve. Several weeks later, Kirby goes with her mother to the doctor to run some tests on her leg. Simultaneously Brendon and his friend Greg are on a self-made boat to look for treasure said to be buried in a sandbar. They paddle their boat to a sandbar, and as they are searching for the treasure, the sea current pushes the boat further into sea. Greg, who is in the boat, tries to paddle the boat back to the sandbar, but the current is too strong and Brendon is left stranded.

Nancy senses that her brother is in trouble and that he is stranded in water. She calls Mr. Duncan and explains the situation, and they agree to meet at the dock in front of Mr. Duncan's house. They use his motorboat to look for Brendon and hear him yelling Nancy's name shortly afterward. Mr. Duncan spots him in the water and pulls him into the motorboat. They later hear that the boat Greg was in reached ground and that Greg was safe. Nancy also receives a call from Kirby telling her that the nerve in her leg has started to repair itself. Nancy becomes more accepting of the relationship between her mother and Mr. Duncan after the events of that day. Mr. Duncan and Elizabeth eventually marry and have a child named Lois, who is born with the gift of storytelling.

== Background and publication history ==
A Gift of Magic was originally published on September 23, 1971, by Little, Brown and Company in hardcover. While Duncan was studying at Duke University, she took part in ESP experiments conducted by J. B. Rhine as a way of getting extra credit. (Note: Duncan did not pass his tests and was not selected to take part in further experiments.) Duncan remembered these experiments when looking for a topic for the novel and based the ESP elements of A Gift of Magic upon Rhine's experiments and her feelings about them at the time. The novel was rejected by seven publishers before Little, Brown agreed to publish it. Other publishers felt that young readers would not be interested in the topic of ESP.

The characters of Kirby, Nancy, and Brendon were based on the three children she had when writing the book. Kirby's character was based on one of Duncan's daughters who wanted to be a ballerina, but who had to abandon that goal after she realized that "she was not going to have the build of a ballerina." The character of Brendon was based on her only son at the time, Brett. Brett played instruments by ear and did not read sheet music, much like Brendon in the story. When Duncan was writing the epilogue, she decided to include a character named after her, explaining that she loved the book and wanted to be in the story as well. She decided that Elizabeth would have a fourth child in the story named Lois Duncan, which meant going back and changing Tom's last name to Duncan. Since Duncan did not have a computer back then, she had to retype her manuscript to make the change.

On June 19, 2012, the novel was reissued with changes to modernize the content, and changes to the name and ages of some of the characters. A Gift of Magic, along with The Third Eye, was the last of ten novels by Duncan to be updated. One of the changes made was increasing the age of Kirby and Nancy to fourteen. Nancy was given an age of twelve in the first edition because Duncan originally wrote the book for eight- to twelve-year-olds. For the updated edition, the publisher wanted to target the book for an older audience so that it was more in line with her other young adult novels. To do this, Little, Brown wanted to increase their ages because "teenagers don't really want to read about twelve-year-olds". The publisher originally suggested making Nancy fourteen and Kirby sixteen, but that presented a problem because Duncan could not identify any professional ballerina that began considerable formal training at that age. They compromised and made both of them fourteen in the updated edition.

The name of one of the other ballerina's at the dance studio Kirby attended was changed from Arlene White to Arlene Wright. Duncan explained that she did not want two characters whose last name was a color, so she changed Arlene's last name. Duncan also updated some of the slang in the updated edition. She contacted her teenage grandchildren and her young editors to help keep the slang more up-to-date. A 2012 audiobook based on the updated text was published by Hachette Audio and narrated by Casey Holloway. Amanda Raklovits from the School Library Journal thought that she "delivers an adequate performance of Duncan's paranormal tale" and that her "youthful voice is appropriate for the main characters' ages, though she has a tendency to over-enunciate at times."

== Major themes ==
A Gift of Magic is Duncan's first novel in which a character has a supernatural trait. This is a theme that has appeared several times in the books she has since written. In the novel, Nancy has to deal with the problems, advantages, and responsibilities her ESP abilities give her. She experiences a problem at school by using the gift to answer questions that the social studies teacher had not yet asked, then getting caught by the teacher. At the end of the book, Mr. Duncan convinces Nancy of a responsibility to not use her gift to try to manage others around her. Mari Ness from Tor.com states that unlike Duncan's other supernatural works, the focus of the novel is acceptance rather than mystery or suspense. In the book, Kirby feels she does not have a dancer's build and has to accept her body, while Nancy has to accept change. Lizzie Skurnick writes in Shelf Discovery that A Gift of Magic is about power. She explains that since Nancy's mother went through a divorce, Nancy learned more about herself and what she could accomplish than if her mother had stayed in "an unhappy marriage."

== Reception ==
In a 1971 review of the novel, Peggy Sullivan from the School Library Journal viewed the book positively, stating that the "[b]ackground on extrasensory perception is well woven into the story". E. Carey Kenney writes in the journal Best Sellers that Nancy's gift of magic "gives pace to the story and leads to an exciting conclusion where she uses her gift to help her brother". Kenney did not like the illustrations by Arvis Stewart in the first edition of the novel, feeling that they are "extremely sophisticated and do not seem to relate well to the simple realism of the story." Tor.com's Mari Ness said in a 2014 review that the updated novel was a stronger work, stating that A Gift of Magic "has a fascinating portrait of someone with immense talent who just doesn't care about it, and several strong family moments".
