= Charlie Gorman =

Charlie Gorman may refer to:

- Charlie Gorman (speed skater), see Canada at the 1924 Winter Olympics
- Charlie Gorman, character in I've Been Waiting for You (film)
- Charlie Gorman, character in Gallows Hill (novel)

== See also ==
- Charles Gorman (disambiguation)
