= Down a Dark Hall =

1974 book by Lois Duncan

- First edition cover
- Author: Lois Duncan
- Language: English
- Genre: Young adult fiction, gothic fiction, thriller
- Publisher: Little, Brown
- Publication date: September 26, 1974
- Publication place: United States
- Media type: Print (hardcover & paperback)
- Pages: 181 (first edition, hardcover)
- ISBN: 0-316-19547-2 (first edition, hardcover)
- OCLC: 866553
- LC Class: PZ7.D9117 Do

Down a Dark Hall is a 1974 young adult gothic novel by Lois Duncan. The book follows Kit Gordy, who is sent to a boarding school where only four students are admitted including herself. The students suddenly develop new talents, with Kit waking up one night playing a musical piece she has never heard. After they are told that they have been channeling the spirits of talented historical figures, Kit tries to escape the school before the bond between the spirits and the students becomes permanent.

Duncan began working on the novel based on the suggestion of an editor who had never seen a gothic novel written for young adults. One version of the novel that she submitted to the publisher was returned to her for revision because all the victims in the story were female whereas all the spirits they were channeling were male. The publisher was worried that feminists would not like this idea, so after Duncan made one of the spirits a woman the book was accepted for publication.

A revised edition of the novel was released in 2011 with updates to modernize the novel. Critical reception to the book was mostly positive, with staff at the University of Iowa adding the novel to their Books for Young Adults list. A film adaptation of the book starring AnnaSophia Robb and Uma Thurman was released in 2018.

== Plot ==
Kit Gordy is forced to go to a boarding school in Upstate New York named the Blackwood School for Girls. She arrives at her home for the school year with her new stepfather and her mother, who are ready to go on their honeymoon. Madame Duret is in charge of the school, having previously run schools in France and England before moving to the United States to open Blackwood.

The girls at the school begin to discover new talents, which manifest most prominently as they sleep. Lynda, who exhibited no artistic ability before attending the school, begins to paint landscapes on a professional level, signing them "T.C." Ruth finds herself able to practice high-level math and science. Sandy, Kit's closest friend at Blackwood, writes sonnets she says were dictated to her by a woman named Ellis. One night, Kit wakes up at the school's piano playing a piece she has never heard as Jules, Madame Duret's son and Blackwood's music teacher, records her. Kit demands to know what is happening at the school and why the students suddenly possess these new skills. A conference with all the students and teachers is quickly arranged so that Kit and the other students can hear the answers to these questions.

Madame Duret explains that she is using the girls to channel the spirits of talented individuals from the past so that they can carry out the work they could not finish before their death. She confirms Ruth's suspicion that Emily Brontë under her pen name Ellis Bell has been contacting Sandy. Kit also realizes that Lynda must be channeling Thomas Cole, whose painting she saw in Madame Duret's office. Several days later, the girls discover that many of their letters to their friends and family have been withheld from them. Kit and Sandy also determine that if they do not leave Blackwood before Christmas vacation, the psychic bonds will become permanent and they will never be free from the harassment of the dead. In an effort to escape the school, Kit slips a letter to Blackwood's former cook and tells her to get it to Tracy Rosenblum, Kit's best friend.

The lights go out during a thunderstorm one night, so Kit sneaks off to Madame Duret's office to call for help. However, the phone line is dead and Jules quickly finds her in the office after Madame Duret sends him out to search for her. Kit convinces him to access Madam Duret's files so they can see what happened to her previous students. Jules looks through the files and discovers that out of the twenty girls at her previous schools, four died and the rest were sent to mental institutions. He finally agrees to help the girls escape. Jules and Kit confront Madame Duret with their findings as Sandy and Ruth look on. Sandy and Ruth throw work they completed into the lit fireplace, angering the spirits and causing the fire to quickly spread across the house. Once they make it safely outside, they realize that they left Lynda in her bedroom. Kit goes back to save her, while Ruth and Sandy throw rocks at her window to get Lynda's attention. Kit convinces Lynda to jump to safety from outside her locked door, but soon realizes that she is trapped in the burning house. An apparition of Kit's father, who died in a car accident when she was little, leads her out of the house. Tracy's family is waiting outside to take her home, having received a phone call from the ex chef that she was being held against her will.

== Background and publication history ==
Down a Dark Hall was originally published on September 26, 1974 by Little, Brown and Company in hardcover. Duncan began writing the book after an editor, who had never seen a gothic novel aimed at young adults, suggested she try coming up with one. Down a Dark Hall is the only gothic novel that Duncan ever wrote. A challenge that she had while writing the book was creating new descriptions for Blackwood's upstairs hallway each time Kit used it to walk to and from her room. She dealt with this problem by describing Kit's journey across the hall at various times in the day. Duncan modeled Kit after her daughter Kerry.

One version of the novel she submitted to the publisher was returned to her for revision because all of the victims in the story were female while all the spirits the students were channeling were male. The publisher was concerned that feminists would have a problem with this idea, so Duncan changed the spirit of the dead poet from Alan Seeger to Emily Brontë, after which the book was accepted for publication. For a scene in the novel which discussed how Madame Duret aged a painting, Duncan consulted her artist friend Betty Sabo, who explained how the process works and reviewed her manuscript to make sure she described it correctly. Down a Dark Hall is dedicated to Betty Sabo and her husband Dan Sabo.

On April 19, 2011, a revised version of the novel was released with changes to modernize the content. Down a Dark Hall, along with Stranger with My Face and Summer of Fear, was the second group of 10 novels by Duncan to be updated. Duncan introduced cell phones in the revised edition, which presented a challenge because it meant that characters could just call for help. To explain away the cell phone, Duncan writes in the story that the school had no cell phone service. Duncan also changed the last name of Kit's mother and stepfather from Rheardon to Rolland because she felt that she had overused the surname Rheardon while updating some of her young adult novels. An audiobook version of the novel was released by Listening Library in 1985, and another, narrated by Emma Galvin, was released by Hachette Audio in 2011. A reviewer from AudioFile liked Galvin's narration, stating that she "eerily portrays the sinister school, staff, and faculty, as well as the terror of the students as events become more and more mysterious."

== Major themes ==
Cosette Kies states in Presenting Lois Duncan that Down a Dark Hall is about loss of personal identity and possession. Deborah Wilson Overstreet, writing in The ALAN Review, says that the book explores the importance of taking responsibility for one's own self. In the novel, Kit demonstrates responsibility by actively being involved in her escape from Blackwood and helping the other students escape.

== Reception ==
Staff at the University of Iowa included the book in their 1975 Books for Young Adults list, which represents the popular reading choices of the junior and senior high school students they surveyed in Iowa. Gloria Levitas from The New York Times thought that Duncan's "off hand treatment" towards Kit's romantic feelings let her focus on the character's intelligence and rationality. She felt that the "result is highly original; a gothic novel that is more a commentary on the dangers of education than on the perils of unrequited love." A reviewer from Kirkus Reviews stated that Duncan is able to portray frightening ghosts in the story without focusing too much on their distinguishing features. In a review of the 2011 revised edition, Tor.com's Mari Ness thought that updating the novel to the 21st century created problems with the book. She felt that it did not make sense that a school that states it provides advanced science lessons has no Internet access and said Kit's mother could have researched the school and its teachers online before sending her daughter there.

== Film adaptation ==
Stephenie Meyer optioned Down a Dark Hall for film in April 2012. Principal photography began in October 2016 in Barcelona and ended in December 2016. Filming took place over four weeks in Barcelona and two weeks in the Canary Islands. It was released on August 17, 2018 with a limited release in theaters and a digital release through video-on-demand. The film grossed $2.71 million during its theatrical run.

The film was directed by Rodrigo Cortés and the screenplay was written by Chris Sparling and Michael Goldbach. It stars AnnaSophia Robb as Kit Gordy and Uma Thurman as Madame Duret. On review aggregator Rotten Tomatoes, the film has an approval rating of 50% based on 26 reviews, with the site's critics consensus reading: "Down a Dark Hall is more stylish than scary, although its foreboding atmosphere may raise a few goosebumps among younger viewers."
