= Killing Mr. Griffin =

Book by Lois Duncan

- First edition cover
- Author: Lois Duncan
- Language: English
- Genre: Suspense
- Publisher: Little, Brown
- Publication date: April 1978
- Media type: Print (hardcover & paperback)
- Pages: 243 (first edition, hardcover)
- ISBN: 0-316-19549-9 (first edition, hardcover)
- OCLC: 453758
- LC Class: PZ7.D9117 Ki

Killing Mr. Griffin is a 1978 suspense novel by Lois Duncan about a group of teenaged students at a New Mexico high school, who plan to kidnap their strict English teacher, Mr. Griffin. Duncan developed the story from the character of Mark, one of the kidnapping conspirators who is based on the first boyfriend of Duncan's oldest daughter. Mr. Griffin was based on the personality of a teacher one of Duncan's daughters had in high school. In 2010, the novel was reissued with changes to modernize the content, making it more age appropriate and appealing to readers.

The book won several awards and honors, including the 1982 Massachusetts Children's Book Award and the 1982–1983 Alabama Camellia Children's Choice Book Award. Killing Mr. Griffin was adapted into a television film of the same name that aired on NBC on April 7, 1997. The film starred Jay Thomas, Amy Jo Johnson, Mario Lopez, and Scott Bairstow, and was first released on DVD and VHS on March 7, 2000.

== Plot ==
Brian Griffin is a strict high-school English teacher at Del Norte High School in Albuquerque, New Mexico, who never accepts late homework and is demanding of his students. When Mark Kinney, one of the students in his class, plagiarizes a paper, Mr. Griffin makes him beg to be allowed back into the class. Instead of allowing him back in, though, Mr. Griffin decides to make him repeat the class next semester. Fellow students in the class he is repeating include David Ruggles, Jeff Garrett, and Betsy Cline. Susan McConell is an A+ student on average, but is constantly receiving below-average B's in his class. Mark suggests kidnapping Mr. Griffin, and convinces David, Jeff, and Betsy to join in on the plan as a way of scaring him and getting revenge because they feel he has treated them poorly.

The group decides to use Susan, who is least willing to participate in the plot, to distract Mr. Griffin by requesting a conference with him after school. Since Susan is one of his better-performing students with a serious approach to her studies, Mr. Griffin willingly does so, allowing her to walk him to his car afterwards. Jeff, David, and Mark forcibly place a bag over Mr. Griffin's head and tie him up, replacing the bag with a blindfold as they take him to a remote spot in the mountains. Betsy, due to a speeding ticket, arrives in the parking lot after the boys have left with Mr. Griffin. Susan is supposed to ride with Betsy, but does not want any further part in the scheme, and Betsy leaves without her. Mark tells Mr. Griffin to beg, but he refuses, so the students decide to leave him alone there until midnight.

Susan and David defy the group and go check on Mr. Griffin. The two find him dead as a result of cardiac arrest after being unable to take his medication for angina. Mark convinces the rest of the group to cover up the death. He instructs Susan, who was the last one known to the police to see Mr. Griffin, to tell them Mr. Griffin kept looking at his watch during the conference and left with a pretty woman. Jeff, Mark, and David bury the body in the mountains. Betsy and David also drive Mr. Griffin's car to the airport, but the officer who gave Betsy a ticket sees her there. Worried that the officer might later identify the car as Mr. Griffin's, Jeff and Betsy move the car into Jeff's garage, so he can repaint it before they hide it elsewhere.

Mark's ex-girlfriend, Lana Turnboldt, has a picnic with her fiancé at the secluded place in the mountains, where they discover Mr. Griffin's medicine bottle. The police investigate, and find Mr. Griffin's body buried nearby. However, police do not find the ring Mr. Griffin was wearing when he died, as David had taken it. Irma Ruggles, David's paternal grandmother who lives with him, discovers the ring and refuses to give it back to him, believing the ring to be that of David's father, who has left him. David tells Susan he took the ring and his grandmother found it, but they are unsuccessful at retrieving it from her, so Susan tells Mark about the situation because she feels he would know what to do. Irma Ruggles is later murdered, and a neighbor refers to the suspect as a boy in a brown sweater. Susan makes the connection, knowing that Mark has a brown sweater he wears all the time, and that Mark would stop at nothing to get what he needed – in this case, the ring.

Susan plans to tell the police all that the group has done. Before she can inform the police, Mark, Jeff, and Betsy tie Susan up, and Jeff and Betsy leave to hide Mr. Griffin's car. Mark sets her curtains on fire, but Susan is saved by Kathy Griffin, (Note: In the first edition of the novel, her name is spelled Kathy, which is the spelling used here. The 2010 revised edition of the novel (ISBN 0-316-09900-7) spells her name Cathy.) Mr. Griffin's wife, who came over to her house with a detective for an interview. The detective catches Mark as he attempts to leave the house through a window. Several days later, Susan's mother tells her that all of those involved will face varying criminal charges, with her lawyer attempting to get Susan off with no charges in exchange for testimony. Mark will face three trials, one each for the deaths of Mr. Griffin and David's grandmother, and one for the attempted murder of Susan. Mrs. Griffin leaves Susan a note that her husband had written before his death, praising Susan for her work and recognizing her potential.

== Characters ==
- Mr. Griffin – A former assistant professor of the University of Albuquerque, he obtained his master's degree in English from Stanford University. He became a high-school English teacher because he felt high schools were lacking good teachers. He is married to Kathy Griffin, who is expecting their first child.
- Susan "Sue" McConnell – A junior, she was a straight-A student before taking Mr. Griffin's class, where she is earning Bs. She has an obsession with David.
- Mark Kinney – A mentally unstable teen, he exhibits many of the signs of psychopathy. He was adopted by his aunt and uncle after his father was killed in a fire.
- Jeff Garrett – A basketball player at Del Norte High School, he is dating Betsy.
- Betsy Cline – The head cheerleader, she is Jeff's girlfriend, and the only child of the county commissioner, Harold Cline and his wife Liz. She is in love with Mark, yet he is uninterested in her.
- David "Davy" Ruggles – The senior class president, he lives with his mother and grandmother. Many readers have asked Duncan whether he is Mr. Griffin's son, which is not stated in the book, and Duncan confirmed this is not true.

== Background ==
The story developed from the character of Mark, who is based on the first boyfriend of Duncan's oldest daughter. Duncan says he "was a very sick young man, and he was the most charming young man you could ever meet", but that it "wasn't until things got very bad that we discovered he was the kind of guy who would swerve in the road to run over a dog." She began to wonder what might happen if a charismatic teenaged psychopath were placed in a high-school setting and the young people he would attract as followers. 'Then I thought "What could he make them do?" The book moved from there.' Mr. Griffin was based on the personality of a drama teacher one of Duncan's daughters had in high school, who "was very strict and demanded that her students do the best work they were capable of doing", but for whom Duncan's daughter was later grateful. Duncan wanted the character to be symbolic of a teacher who is not appreciated at the time, but later is.

Killing Mr. Griffin was first published in April 1978 by Little, Brown and Company in hardcover. In October 2010, Little, Brown reissued the novel in paperback with updates to modernize some of the content. Killing Mr. Griffin, along with I Know What You Did Last Summer and Don't Look Behind You, were the first group of 10 different titles that were updated and reissued with these changes. An audiobook was released by Listening Library in 1986, and another, read by Ed Sala, was released by Recorded Books in 1998. A reviewer from AudioFile felt that Sala's narration was effective, although occasionally, he "seems to lose concentration and expression." A 2010 audiobook, narrated by Dennis Holland, was published by Hachette Audio, and features the modernized text.

== Major themes ==
In the letter Mr. Griffin wrote for Susan, he comments, "It is indeed the little deaths, the small daily rejections of our well-meant offerings that render the soul lifeless." Duncan refers to this as one of the main themes in the novel, adding that the students "were killing [Mr. Griffin]'s soul before they killed him physically." Killing Mr. Griffin also explores the downsides of peer pressure. Due to Susan's desire for peer acceptance, she becomes involved in the plan to kidnap Mr. Griffin. The group has to deal with a result they did not anticipate for the kidnapping – Mr. Griffin's death. They have to cover up the crime, while preventing Susan from revealing to the police what they have done.

== Reception ==
Killing Mr. Griffin has received several honors and awards. In 1978, it was selected as an American Library Association (ALA) Best Book for Young Adults. It was nominated for the 1981 California Young Reader Medal in the Young Adult category and in 1982, it won the Massachusetts Children's Book Award. It was also given the 1982–1983 Alabama Camellia Children's Choice Book Award in the grade 7–9 category. However, some people have objected to including Killing Mr. Griffin in schools and libraries; the novel was 64th in ALA's list of most frequently challenged books from 1990–1999, and 25th in its list of most challenged/banned books from 2000–2009. According to the ALA, Killing Mr. Griffin was the fourth most challenged book of 2000 for "violence and sexual content".

Drew Stevenson, writing for School Library Journal, stated, "skillful plotting builds layers of tension that draws readers into the eye of the conflict" and the ending "is nicely handled in a manner which provides relief without removing any of the chilling implications." Zena Sutherland from Bulletin of the Center for Children's Books commented that the "end is logical, the construction of the plot and the relationships among the well-drawn characters is solid, and the story has pace and suspense." The New York Times's Richard Peck felt that the book's value "lies in the twisted logic of the teenagers and how easily they can justify anything", but that "the plot descends into unadulterated melodrama." He stated, "Killing Mr. Griffin 'becomes "an easy read when it shouldn't'," although "there's veracity unto the end: the parents are the last to lose their innocence."

== Adaptation ==
The book was adapted into a television film of the same title, which first aired April 7, 1997, on NBC. It received a Nielsen rating of 10.7 and was viewed in 10.4 million households. The film starred Scott Bairstow as Mark Kinney, Amy Jo Johnson as Susan McConnell, Mario Lopez as David Ruggles, and Jay Thomas as Mr. Griffin, and was directed by Jack Bender. Maitland McDonagh from TV Guide gave the film two stars out of four, stating, "this tale wraps serious issues — peer pressure and the desire for social acceptance — in an entertaining crime-thriller tale that never seems entirely outlandish." She thought the story's rhythm was "disrupted by commercial-television pacing", but felt the cast, especially Johnson, delivered a strong performance. Killing Mr. Griffin was first released on VHS and DVD on March 7, 2000.

== See also ==
- Teaching Mrs. Tingle – a film with a similar plot released in 1999
