= Middle Sister =

Middle Sister can refer to:

- The Middle Sister of the Three Sisters, a group of volcanic mountain peaks in Oregon
- Middle Sister (California), a peak in the Sweetwater Mountains of California
- Middle Sister Island, a Canadian island in Lake Erie
- The Middle Sister, a 1960 novel by Lois Duncan
