= Massachusetts Children's Book Award =

American literary award

The Massachusetts Children's Book Award is an annual literary award recognizing one book selected by vote of Massachusetts schoolchildren from a list prepared by committee. It was established in 1975 by Dr. Helen Constant, associate professor of education at Salem State College, and it continues to be sponsored by the School of Education at Salem State University. The purpose is to help maintain interest in reading among children in the "intermediate grades".

Students in grades 4 to 6 (almost all 9 to 12 years old) are eligible to vote for one favorite book if they have read at least five on the list, which now comprises 25 books that are no more than five years old. Participation is coordinated through schools, often by the school library, but public librarians may facilitate the program for home-schooled children and those whose schools do not participate in the program. The book with the greatest number of votes wins the Award—the writer gets a commemorative plaque—and a number of runners-up, commonly four, are named honor books.

Currently "teachers, librarians, and interested publishers" nominate books and all of those selected must be available in paperback editions. Other criteria include "literary quality, variety of genres, representation of diverse cultural groups, and reader appeal." For the 2014 award, the Master List comprised 25 books published from 2009 to 2013, almost half in 2011. A "Grade Level Guide" placed five of the books in each of five levels from "low fourth" (low fourth grade) to "advanced sixth".

== History ==
The Mass. Children's Book Award program was inaugurated during the 1975–76 school year and the first winner was How to Eat Fried Worms by Thomas Rockwell, which was then three years old. The "First Annual Massachusetts Book Award Conference" was scheduled to run for seven hours from 8:30 at Salem State College Library on July 1. It was one of the "Specials", distinct from "Bicentennial" events, listed by The Boston Globe that morning. One year later Tales of a Fourth Grade Nothing by Judy Blume won the second poll, in which 5000 students in 400 classes voted on 25 books "nominated by teachers, librarians, and youngsters". Second to fifth-place finishers were also identified at the mid-year conference. Late that year the Globe reported that "children in grades 4 through 9 will vote for their favorite books in the third annual contest". For six years then, to 1983, there were a pair of MCBA determined by votes of children in grades 4–6 and in grades 7–9 (generally, ages 9–12 and 12–15). The grades 7–9 winner in 1979, The Cat Ate My Gymsuit by Paula Danziger, had been the runner-up in 1977, voted by grades 4–6 only.

Tales of a Fourth Grade Nothing won the grades 4–6 award again in 1983, the only book to win two MCBA. Four books published during the 1950s and 1960s were winners, as late as 1987 (see table). After 1995, however, the Master List was limited to books published during the five-year span ending that year (that is, 1992 to 1996 for the 1997 award). The winning books since then have ranged from one to five years old.

== Nominees ==
2024-2025 MCBA Nominees

Author	Title	Publication year
David Aguilar, Ferran Aguilar	Piece by Piece: How I Built My Life (No Instructions Required)	2022
John David Anderson	Stowaway	2021
Andrea Beatriz Arango	Something Like Home	2023
Marie Arnold	The Year I Flew Away	2022
Annie Barrows	The Best of Iggy	2020
Kalynn Bayron	The Vanquishers	2022
Angela Cervantes	Lety Out Loud	2019
Johnnie Christmas	Swim Team	2022
Sophie Cleverly	A Case of Grave Danger	2021
Leslie Connor	Anybody Here Seen Frenchie?	2022
Reem Faruqi	Unsettled	2021
K. A. Holt	BenBee and the Teacher Griefer	2020
Ira Marcks	Shark Summer	2021
Pedro Martín	Mexikid: A Graphic Memoir	2023
Maulik Pancholy	Nikhil Out Loud	2022
Linda Sue Park	The One Thing You'd Save	2021
Lynne Rae Perkins	Violet & Jobie in the Wild	2022
Shawn Peters	The Unforgettable Logan Foster	2022
Liz Prince	Science Comics: Frogs: Awesome Amphibians	2023
A. J. Sass	Ellen Outside the Lines	2022
Phil Stamper	Small Town Pride	2022
Jane de Suza	When Impossible Happens	2021
Matt Tavares	Hoops	2023
Jasmine Warga	A Rover's Story	2022
Renée Watson	Ways to Make Sunshine	2020

== Winners ==
Massachusetts Children's Book Award winners
	Title	Author	Publ.	Note
2024	Frizzy	Claribel A. Ortega	2022	ill. Rose Bousrama
2023	Alone	Megan E. Freeman	2022	
2022	The Wild Robot	Peter Brown	2016	
2021	Front Desk	Kelly Yang	2018	
2020	The Crossover	Kwame Alexander	2014	
2019	A Night Divided	Jennifer A. Nielsen	2015	
2018	The War that Saved My Life	Kimberley Brubaker Bradley	2015	
2017	El Deafo	Cece Bell	2014	
2016	The One and Only Ivan	Katherine Applegate	2012	
2015	The Lions of Little Rock	Kristin Levine	2012	
2014	Out of My Mind	Sharon Draper	2010	
2013	Because of Mr. Terupt	Rob Buyea	2010	
2012	When You Reach Me	Rebecca Stead	2009	
2011	11 Birthdays	Wendy Mass	2009	
2010	Found	Margaret Peterson Haddix	2008	
2009	The Mysterious Benedict Society	Trenton Lee Stewart	2007	ill. Carson Ellis
2008	The Lightning Thief	Rick Riordan	2005	ill. John Rocco
2007	The Tale of Despereaux	Kate DiCamillo	2006	ill. Timothy B. Ering
2006	Molly Moon's Incredible Book of Hypnotism	Georgia Byng	2002	
2005	The Thief Lord	Cornelia Funke	2002	illustrated by Funke; orig. German, 2000
2004	Jackie & Me	Dan Gutman	1999	photo illustrations
2003	Artemis Fowl	Eoin Colfer	2001	
2002	Because of Winn-Dixie	Kate DiCamillo	2000	
2001	Holes	Louis Sachar	1998	
2000	Harry Potter and the Philosopher's Stone	J. K. Rowling	1997	ill. Mary GrandPré, 1998 (US)
1999	Frindle	Andrew Clements	1996	ill. Brian Selznick
1998	Crash	Jerry Spinelli	1996	
1997	Wayside School Gets A Little Stranger	Louis Sachar	1995	
1996	The True Confessions of Charlotte Doyle	Avi	1990	
1995	Hatchet	Gary Paulsen	1987	
1994	Shiloh	Phyllis Reynolds Naylor	1991	
1993	Maniac Magee	Jerry Spinelli	1990	
1992	Matilda	Roald Dahl	1988	ill. Quentin Blake
1991	There's a Boy in the Girls' Bathroom	Louis Sachar	1987	
1990	(no award program)			
1989	The Chocolate Touch	Patrick Skene Catling	1952	ill. Margot Apple, 1979
1988	The Indian in the Cupboard	Lynne Reid Banks	1980	ill. Brock Cole
1987	Where the Red Fern Grows	Wilson Rawls	1961	
1986	Dear Mr. Henshaw	Beverly Cleary	1983	ill. Paul O. Zelinsky
1985	Nothing's Fair in the Fifth Grade	Barthe DeClements	1981	
1984	Charlotte's Web	E. B. White	1952	ill. Garth Williams
1983	Tales of a Fourth Grade Nothing	Judy Blume	1972	ill. Roy Doty
1983	Stranger with My Face	Lois Duncan	1981	grades 7–9
1982	James and the Giant Peach	Roald Dahl	1961	various illustrators, none recent in 1982
1982	Killing Mr. Griffin	Lois Duncan	1978	grades 7–9
1981	The Great Gilly Hopkins	Katherine Paterson	1978	
1981	A Summer to Die	Lois Lowry	1977	grades 7–9 ill. Jenni Oliver
1980	Chocolate Fever	Robert Kimmel Smith	1972	ill. Gena Fiammenghi
1980	Summer of My German Soldier	Bette Greene	1973	grades 7–9
1979	The Cricket in Times Square	George Selden	1960	ill. Garth Williams
1979	The Cat Ate My Gymsuit	Paula Danziger	1974	grades 7–9
1978	Mrs. Frisby and the Rats of NIMH	Robert C. O'Brien	1971	ill. Zena Bernstein
1978	That Was Then, This Is Now	S. E. Hinton	1971	grades 7–9
1977	Tales of a Fourth Grade Nothing	Judy Blume	1972	ill. Roy Doty
1976	How to Eat Fried Worms	Thomas Rockwell	1973	

== Multiple awards ==
Louis Sachar has written three MCBA-winning books, published from 1987 to 1998: There's a Boy in the Girls' Bathroom, Wayside School Gets A Little Stranger, and Holes. Several people have written two winning books and Tales of a Fourth Grade Nothing (Dutton, 1972) by Judy Blume won both the 1977 and 1983 awards.
