= Skurnick =

Skurnick is a surname. Notable people with the surname include:

- Jack Skurnick (1910–1952), American record producer and writer
- Lizzie Skurnick, American writer, critic and editor
