= A Promise for Joyce =

1959 novel by Lois Duncan

- Author: Lois Duncan
- Language: English
- Genre: Novel
- Published: September 25, 1959
- Publisher: Funk & Wagnalls
- Pages: 214
- Preceded by: Love Song for Joyce

A Promise for Joyce is a 1959 novel by Lois Duncan, under the pen name Lois Kerry. It is a sequel to her debut novel, Love Song for Joyce (1958).

== Plot ==
After a tumultuous first year away from home at Denton College, Joyce enrolls for her sophomore year of classes and finds herself troubled by her boyfriend's strenuous pre-med studies.

== See also ==
- Love Song for Joyce
