= Point of Violence =

1966 novel by Lois Duncan

- First edition
- Author: Lois Duncan
- Language: English
- Genre: Thriller; realism
- Publisher: Doubleday

Point of Violence is a 1966 thriller novel by Lois Duncan. It is one of Duncan's few novels written primarily for adults. It follows a young widow who finds herself being stalked while hiding at a remote beach house after the murder of her husband.

== Plot ==
Julia Culler, a recent widow after her husband, Mark, died in a water skiing accident, relocates with her two children to a house on Heron Key, suspicious of a man whom she believes is responsible for her husband's death. At her remote beach home, she finds herself being stalked by an unseen assailant.
