= Hotel for Dogs =

1971 book by Lois Duncan

- First edition
- Author: Lois Duncan
- Illustrator: Leonard Shortall
- Language: English
- Genre: Young adult fiction
- Published: June 1, 1971
- Publisher: Houghton Mifflin
- Pages: 178
- ISBN: 978-0-395-12364-5

Hotel for Dogs (1971) is a children's novel by Lois Duncan. It was adapted into a film of the same name by Nickelodeon Movies for DreamWorks Pictures, released on January 16, 2009. When the book was originally released in 1971, Andi's name was Liz, and Friday's name was Sadie. To promote the film adaptation, the book was re-released on December 1, 2008 with various changes and modernization, such as Mrs. Walker, Andi's mother, revised to being a schoolteacher instead of a housewife.

Two sequels were released: News for Dogs in 2009 and Movie for Dogs in 2010.

== Plot ==
Andrea "Andi" Walker is a girl who was forced to temporarily move to her animal-allergic great-aunt Alice's house, leaving her dog Bebe in the care of another family. Shortly after the move, she finds a stranded dog and wishes to keep her. Andi's mother vetoes this idea. Along with her older brother Bruce, she keeps the dog, who she names Friday, and her pups in an abandoned house across the street.

After a while, Andi and Bruce allow in many more dogs, including Red Rover, an Irish Setter that ran away from his abusive owner, Jerry Gordon, Aunt Alice's neighbor who hides his abusive behavior. In the end, their expenses overwhelm them, and they are discovered by their father, mother, and aunt. Jerry's wickedness is revealed to his ignorant father, prompting him to sell Red Rover.

After all the dogs leave the hotel, Red Rover, Friday, and Bebe return home with the Walkers when they move out of Aunt Alice's house, while all the other dogs are adopted.

== Characters ==
=== Humans ===
- Andrea "Andi" Walker – The main character, known for her love of dogs.
- Bruce Walker – Andi's brother, he helps her take in the abandoned dogs.
- Jerry Gordon – Andi and Bruce's enemy, he abuses his dog Red Rover.
- Aunt Alice – Andi and Bruce's aunt, she has a dog allergy.
- Tim – A boy originally from Jerry Gordon's gang, he comes to help Andi and Bruce with the dog hotel.
- Mr Walker – Andi and Bruce's Dad
- Mrs Walker – Andi and Bruce's Mom
- Debbie – Andi's friend, she helps her with the hotel
- Tiffany – Andi's friend, she helps her with the hotel. She, as owner of the Bulldales, is the one to get them.

=== Dog characters ===
- MacTavish – An abandoned dog that Andi takes to the hotel
- Red Rover – An Irish Setter that belongs to Jerry Gordon and was mistreated by him
- Bebe – Andi's first dog that she has to leave behind
- Friday – A little dog that Andi finds and takes to the hotel, she also has puppies
- Preston – A big, tough hound
- The Bulldales – Five puppies owned by Tiffany
