= Gallows Hill (novel) =

1997 novel by Lois Duncan

- First edition
- Author: Lois Duncan
- Cover artist: Cynthia Torp
- Language: English
- Subject: Salem Witch Trials
- Genre: Supernatural thriller
- Publisher: Delacorte Books for Young Readers
- Publication date: May 1, 1997
- Publication place: USA
- Media type: Paperback
- Pages: 227

Gallows Hill is a 1997 supernatural thriller novel for young adults by Lois Duncan. It was her first and only young adult novel written after the death of her daughter. It was written eight years after her previous young adult novel, Don't Look Behind You. It is about a girl who moves to a small town with a secret.

== Plot ==
Sarah Zoltanne is an extraordinary girl. Her widowed mother, Rosemary, decides to move to Pinecrest because of Ted Thompson. When Sarah starts school as the new pupil, she makes no friends. Role-playing takes on a terrifying cast when 17-year-old Sarah, who is posing as a fortune-teller for a school fair, begins to see actual visions that can predict the future. Frightened, the other students brand her a witch, setting off a chain of events that mirror the centuries-old Salem witch trials in more ways than one.

== Reception ==
Gallows Hill has received several honors and awards. In 1997, Gallows Hill was designated a Junior Library Guild Selection. A year later, the novel was listed as an American Library Association (ALA) Quick Pick for Reluctant Young Adult Readers, and the New York Public Library listed it as a Book for the Teen Age. In 2000, Gallows Hill won the Nevada Young Readers' Award in the Young Adult category. One year later, it was given the 2000–2001 Tennessee Volunteer State Book Award for Young Adults.

== Film adaptation ==
A TV film called I've Been Waiting For You (1998), loosely based on the novel, was made. It was an NBC Movie of the Week and starred Sarah Chalke, Markie Post, Ben Foster, and Soleil Moon Frye.

== See also ==
- Salem Witch Trials
- Gallows Hill (disambiguation)
- Witchcraft
