= Daughters of Eve (novel) =

Book by Lois Duncan

- First edition
- Author: Lois Duncan
- Language: English
- Genre: Horror; young adult
- Published: 1979
- Publisher: Little Brown & Company
- Pages: 239
- ISBN: 978-0-316-19550-8

Daughters of Eve is a 1979 novel by Lois Duncan. Incorporating feminist themes, the novel follows a group of young women who become convinced by a charismatic teacher to punish their fathers.

== Plot ==
The girls at Modesta High School in a small town in rural Michigan feel like they are stuck in an anti-feminist time warp-they are faced with sexism at every turn, and they have had enough. Sponsored by their new art teacher, Ms. Irene Stark, they band together to form the Daughters of Eve, a secret society.

Stark preaches women's liberation, which convinces each of the girls to stand up against the men who oppress them in their day-to-day lives. At first, it seems that they are successfully changing the way guys at school treat them. But Ms. Stark urges them to take ever more vindictive action and brutal revenge.

== Adaptation ==
In May 1998, it was reported that Warner Bros. had acquired an option on Lois Duncan's novel Daughters of Eve for producer Joel Silver with Carla Lane set to adapt the novel.

== Controversy ==
Due to its thematic concerns with rape, abortion, domestic violence, feminism and antifeminism, the novel was banned from libraries in several states upon its 1997 republication, namely from Jackson County School libraries in West Virginia in 1997, as well as school libraries in Virginia, Indiana, and New Mexico from 2000 to 2005.
