= Stranger in Our House =

1978 American television horror film directed by Wes Craven

- Belgian theatrical poster
- Also known as: Summer of Fear
- Genre: Horror; thriller
- Based on: Summer of Fear by Lois Duncan
- Screenplay by: Glenn M. Benest; Max A. Keller
- Directed by: Wes Craven
- Starring: Linda Blair; Lee Purcell
- Composers: John D'Andrea; Michael Lloyd
- Country of origin: United States

Production
- Executive producers: Max A. Keller; Micheline H. Keller
- Producers: Bill Finnegan; Pat Finnegan
- Production locations: 5950 Spring Valley Road, Hidden Hills, California
- Cinematography: William K. Jurgensen
- Editor: Howard A. Smith
- Running time: 99 minutes (Note: In the book Television Fright Films of the 1970s, the running time for the film is listed at 99 minutes, which matches the running time featured on the 2003 Artisan Entertainment DVD release.)
- Production companies: Finnegan Associates; Inter Planetary Pictures Inc.

Original release
- Network: NBC
- Release: October 31, 1978

Stranger in Our House, also known as Summer of Fear, is a 1978 American supernatural horror film directed by Wes Craven and starring Linda Blair, Lee Purcell, Carol Lawrence, Jeremy Slate, Jeff McCracken, and Jeff East. Based on the 1976 novel Summer of Fear by Lois Duncan, it follows a teenage girl who suspects her orphaned cousin who has come to live with her family is a witch. This film is also notable for having Fran Drescher in an early supporting role.

In the United States, the film was released on television, premiering on NBC on October 31, 1978, though it subsequently received theatrical releases in Europe under the title Summer of Fear.

== Plot ==
Teenager Julia is orphaned after her parents and housekeeper die in a car accident on the east coast. She is taken in by her Aunt Leslie and Uncle Tom at their ranch in California, along with their teenage children Rachel and Peter and adolescent son, Bobby. Rachel is initially thrilled at the thought of having a girl her age around the house and even offers to split her bedroom with her cousin, but Julia seems painfully shy. The family takes note of her strange accent, which is uncharacteristic of someone from the east coast. Trying to open up, Julia gets a makeover and develops a more sophisticated façade.

One day, Rachel's horse Sundance attacks Julia and tries to trample her. Julia recovers and begins ingratiating herself into the family. Odd things continue to happen—after having earlier found a human tooth among Julia's belongings, Rachel discovers a photo of herself missing, and shortly after finds in Julia's dresser drawers burned hair from her fallen horse. Soon Rachel's face breaks out in hives, preventing her from attending a dance. Julia accompanies Rachel's boyfriend Mike instead, borrowing a dress that Rachel had made for herself. Soon after Julia begins dating Mike, while forging a close friendship with Carolyn, Rachel's best friend. The day after the dance, Rachel enters into a competition with Sundance, where the horse is spooked, breaking its leg in the process and forcing a vet to euthanize it.

Rachel speaks to her neighbor, Professor Jarvis, who tells her it may indeed be the work of someone who practices black magic. She looks in Julia's drawer to find evidence to show Jarvis and discovers a missing photo covered in red paint spots. Before she can show him the evidence however, the professor collapses and is rushed to the hospital. A letter that Julia receives from a friend gets the best of Rachel's curiosity. Rachel phones the friend in Boston and discovers that Julia supposedly sings in her school's glee club. Knowing that the person living in her house doesn't have any interest in music, Rachel further suspects something is not right. Immersing herself in books on the occult, Rachel starts to believe Julia is a witch. During a visit to the professor at the hospital, he tells her that true witches cannot appear in photographs. The next day, Rachel encourages her mother to take pictures of a reluctant Julia. Tensions reach a boiling point when Leslie plans a road trip and Rachel finds a map with burn marks on it. Rachel believes Julia is planning on causing her mother to have an accident, and subsequently witnesses Julia making overt sexual advances to her father.

Too late to stop Leslie from leaving on the trip, Rachel develops the roll of film herself and clearly sees that her suspicions have been correct all along—Julia is nowhere to be found in the photos. Suddenly, Julia comes into the darkroom, burning the pictures and revealing that she is Sarah Brown, the housekeeper, not Rachel's cousin Julia. The two have a fierce struggle, before Rachel manages to break away, locking the door to the developing room. She then evades her father, apparently under the housekeeper's spell. Sarah breaks out of the room, her eyes a ghastly white and red. Rachel rushes to Mike and tells him to get in his car so they can find her mother. Sarah takes off after them, hitting Mike's car and driving them off the road. On foot, Rachel and Mike catch sight of Rachel's mother, whose car causes Sarah to drive off a cliff to a fiery explosion below. The Bryant family tries to return to normal, adopting a new horse. Meanwhile, another family welcomes Julia into their home, posing as a nanny.

== Cast ==
- Linda Blair as Rachel Bryant
- Lee Purcell as Sarah Brown / Julia Grant / Susan Peterson
- Jeremy Slate as Tom Bryant
- Jeff McCracken as Mike Gallagher
- Jeff East as Peter Bryant
- Carol Lawrence as Leslie Bryant
- Macdonald Carey as Professor Jarvis
- James Jarnigan as Bobby Bryant
- Fran Drescher as Carolyn Baker

== Production ==
=== Development ===
Stranger in Our House marked Craven's first film project upon his relocation from New York City to Los Angeles. "I had come out to California to do some minor stuff and got invited in to do that," Craven recalled. "I think that was the first time working with a Hollywood star of sorts, Linda Blair. First time working in thirty-five millimeter, first time using a crane, a dolly, so it was a great education for me. And it was a good shoot."

=== Casting ===
The film marked actress Linda Blair's third leading role in a horror film, following her Oscar-nominated performance in The Exorcist (1973) and its sequel Exorcist II: The Heretic (1977). In his DVD commentary, director Wes Craven recalled that Blair had recently "gotten into some trouble" prior to filming; also that he was plainly inspired by Roman Polanski's work, and tried to carefully build a sense of paranoia and suspense in the film's narrative. In the role of Rachel's mother, stage actress Carol Lawrence was cast. Lee Purcell was cast as Julia, the cousin Rachel suspects of being a witch. Purcell sought out the role as she had wanted to do a thriller film. Fran Drescher was cast in a supporting role as Carolyn, Rachel's close friend. The cast was announced in July 1978.

=== Filming ===
While the source novel by Lois Duncan features Rachel losing a pet dog, Blair suggested to Craven that it be a horse, as Blair, an equestrian at the time, had a close bond to the animal. Filming took place in Hidden Hills, California. Craven earned his Director's Guild card working on the project, and it marked his first time shooting in a "non-documentary" format, utilizing professional filming equipment including cranes, dollies, and 35 mm film.

== Release ==
Stranger in Our House first aired on television in the United States on NBC-TV on October 31, 1978. It was released in European markets theatrically, bearing the title Summer of Fear.

=== Home media ===
The film was released in the United States on VHS and DVD on February 18, 2003, through Artisan Entertainment. On June 1, 2017, it was announced that the film would be receiving a Blu-ray and special edition DVD release through Doppelgänger Releasing.

== Reception ==
From contemporary reviews, the Monthly Film Bulletin "takes a long time to convince that something really devlish is lurking in California's green and pleasant pastures" The review noted that Ms. Purcell "deserves to survive this farrago rather more than the satanic Beverly hillbilly she plays." Kevin Thomas of the Los Angeles Times deemed the film "a sappy thriller" but praised Craven's direction as "relaxed" and "graceful."

AllMovie called the film "a modestly entertaining horror item." In a retrospective review for ScreenAnarchy, Peter Martin praised the film as "a slow-boiling, atmospheric" horror film.

While the film hasn not garnered enough reviews to receive a rating on movie review aggregator website Rotten Tomatoes, all four listed reviews are negative.

== Sources ==
- Darowski, John; Berns, Fernando Gabriel Pagnoni, eds. (2023). A Critical Companion to Wes Craven. Lanham, Maryland: Lexington Books. ISBN 978-1-666-91907-3.
- Deal, David (2015). Television Fright Films of the 1970s. Jefferson, North Carolina: McFarland & Company. ISBN 978-0-786-45514-0.
- Hutson, Thommy (2016). Never Sleep Again: The Elm Street Legacy: The Making of Wes Craven's A Nightmare on Elm Street. New York City, New York: Simon & Schuster. ISBN 978-1-618-68640-4.
- Jones, Alan (2020). Skelton, Shannon Blake (ed.). Wes Craven: Interviews. Jackson, Mississippi: University Press of Mississippi. ISBN 978-1-496-82610-7.
- Muir, John Kenneth (2004). Wes Craven: The Art of Horror. Jefferson, North Carolina: McFarland & Company. ISBN 0786419237.
- Terrace, Vincent (2024). Experimental Television, Test Films, Pilots and Trial Series, 1925 through 1995: Seven Decades of Small Screen Almosts. Jefferson, North Carolina: McFarland & Company. ISBN 978-1-476-63223-0.
- Waller, Gregory Albert, ed. (1987). American Horrors: Essays on the Modern American Horror Film. University of Illinois Press. ISBN 978-0-252-01448-2.
