= Season of the Two-Heart =

1964 novel by Lois Duncan

- First edition cover art
- Author: Lois Duncan
- Language: English
- Genre: Novel; young adult
- Published: August 10, 1964
- Publisher: Dodd, Mead and Company
- Pages: 213

Season of the Two-Heart is a 1964 novel by Lois Duncan. The plot follows a teenager from a Pueblo reservation who moves to Albuquerque to care for two young children.

== Plot ==
Natachu Weekoty is a Native Puebloan who leaves the Pueblo reservation to care for two children in Albuquerque, New Mexico in exchange for being able to attend high school with their older sister, Laurie. Natachu faces numerous changes and adjustments to life outside the reservation and her native culture in the process, including her attractions to a male classmate and her own prejudices toward a Navajo student.

== Critical reception ==
Kirkus Reviews published a review of the novel, in which it was noted that Duncan's "lovely [writing] voice is likely to continue to serve Natachu as a bridge between her two worlds."
