= Down a Dark Hall (film) =

2018 supernatural horror film

- Theatrical release poster
- Directed by: Rodrigo Cortés
- Screenplay by: Mike Goldbach; Chris Sparling
- Based on: Down a Dark Hall by Lois Duncan
- Produced by: Stephenie Meyer; Wyck Godfrey; Marty Bowen; Meghan Hibbett; Adrian Guerra
- Starring: AnnaSophia Robb; Isabelle Fuhrman; Victoria Moroles; Noah Silver; Taylor Russell; Rosie Day; Uma Thurman
- Cinematography: Jarin Blaschke
- Edited by: Rodrigo Cortés
- Music by: Víctor Reyes
- Production companies: Summit Entertainment; Temple Hill Entertainment; Fickle Fish Films; Nostromo Pictures
- Distributed by: Lionsgate (United States); Entertainment One (Spain)
- Release dates: August 1, 2018 (Italy); August 3, 2018 (Spain); August 17, 2018 (United States)
- Running time: 96 minutes
- Countries: United States; Spain
- Language: English
- Budget: $4 million
- Box office: $2.7 million

Down a Dark Hall is a 2018 supernatural horror film directed by Rodrigo Cortés and written by Chris Sparling and Michael Goldbach. It is based on the 1974 novel of the same name by Lois Duncan. Summit Entertainment released it in select theaters and through video-on-demand in the United States on August 17, 2018.

== Plot ==
Kit Gordy, a difficult young girl, is sent to the mysterious Blackwood Boarding School after her delinquent behavior becomes too much for her school to handle. When she arrives at Blackwood, Kit meets eccentric headmistress Madame Duret and the school's only other students, four teenage girls with similar behavioral problems (Veronica, Ashley, Sierra, and Izzy). Technology is rarely used, and the girls can only phone their families in the domineering presence of the headmistress. The girls attend a variety of creative and intellectual classes, which begins to draw out unknown talents in them.

Sierra is the first to show a troubling obsession with her work, losing sleep, refusing to eat, and going into odd trances while creating amazing works of art. Ashley writes beautiful poetry and stories that deeply disturb her. Kit and Izzy slowly begin to experience the same bad side effects, saying it was like someone else was using their bodies. Only the belligerent Veronica shows no progress, much to Madame Duret's annoyance. During art class Kit notices that all of Sierra's paintings are signed "TC" and searches the school's library for answers. She realizes that Sierra is recreating paintings by the deceased artist Thomas Cole, and that the others are producing work from other dead geniuses.

Kit convinces Veronica to search the restricted areas of the school, where they come across old student records and more information on the people possessing the girls. When Madame Duret discovers Veronica alone she chains her up in an unused part of the school, explaining that the students are not merely vessels for the dead, but donors, unknowingly sacrificing themselves to be used to continue the careers of famous minds, whom she is able to commune with and channel into the girls' bodies. Kit calls the police and confronts the headmistress about everything. By now Sierra has already died from overwork, and Ashley jumps to her death to stop the possession taking over completely.

While struggling to free Veronica, Kit knocks over some candles, and fire quickly spreads throughout the old building. Izzy succumbs to the beauty of the flames, leaving only Kit and Veronica to escape. Madame Duret is eventually possessed by her former pupils and consumed by the fire. Kit passes out and meets her deceased father, who convinces her to stay and live. She wakes up in the back of an ambulance with her mother by her side.

== Cast ==
- AnnaSophia Robb as Katherine "Kit" Gordy
  - Julia Stressen-Reuter as Young Kit
- Uma Thurman as Madame Duret
- Victoria Moroles as Veronica
- Noah Silver as Jules Duret
- Isabelle Fuhrman as Izzy
- Taylor Russell as Ashley
- Rosie Day as Sierra
- Rebecca Front as Miss Olonsky
- Jodhi May as Heather Sinclair
- Pip Torrens as Professor Farley
- Kirsty Mitchell as Ginny
- Jim Sturgeon as Dave
- David Elliot as Robert Gordon
- Brian Bovell as Dr. MacMillan
- Ramiro Blas as Disfigured Man
- Josep Linuesa as Wilhelm Kestler

== Production ==
Stephenie Meyer optioned the Lois Duncan novel in April 2012. In July 2014, Lionsgate acquired the film. Rodrigo Cortés was announced as the director the same day, and screenwriter Chris Sparling was set to work using a previous draft by Michael Goldbach. In early October 2016, AnnaSophia Robb was announced to play the main role, and Taylor Russell joined the cast three days later. On October 24, Victoria Moroles joined the cast as Veronica.

To promote the pending release, Summit Entertainment released a trailer online for the film on May 22, 2018.

=== Filming ===
Principal photography began in October 2016 in Barcelona. with Jarin Blaschke as the director of photography. After four weeks of shooting in Barcelona and two weeks in the Canary Islands, filming ended in December 2016.

== Release ==
Down a Dark Hall was released in Italy on August 1, 2018, and in Spain on August 3, 2018. In the United States, the film was released on August 17, 2018, by Summit Entertainment simultaneously in select theaters and via video-on-demand. The film was released on Blu-ray combo pack and DVD on October 16, 2018, by Lionsgate Home Entertainment.

== Reception ==
On Rotten Tomatoes the film holds an approval rating of 46% based on 26 reviews and has an average rating of 5.3/10. The site's critics consensus reads: "Down a Dark Hall is more stylish than scary, although its foreboding atmosphere may raise a few goosebumps among younger viewers." On Metacritic, the film has a weighted average score of 56 out of 100, based on 8 critics, indicating "mixed or average" reviews.
