= They Never Came Home =

1968 novel by Lois Duncan

- First edition cover art
- Author: Lois Duncan
- Language: English
- Genre: Thriller; young adult
- Publisher: Doubleday

They Never Came Home is a 1968 mystery-thriller novel by Lois Duncan. The novel was nominated for an Edgar Allan Poe Award.

== Plot ==
Teenage friends Larry and Dan go missing after embarking on a hiking trip. Upon investigation, a stranger claims that one of the boys owed him $2,000, prompting Joan, a sister of one of the boys, to begin her own search for them.

A second edition was published in 2012, updating the story to modern times. Changes included references to cell phones and the Internet, as well as adjusting the money owed to $50,000.

== Accolades ==
- Nominated - Edgar Award, 1969
