= Locked in Time =

Book by Lois Duncan

- First edition cover
- Author: Lois Duncan
- Cover artist: Derek James
- Language: English
- Genre: Suspense, young adult literature
- Publisher: Little, Brown
- Publication date: April 1985
- Publication place: United States
- Media type: Print (hardcover & paperback)
- Pages: 210 (first edition)
- ISBN: 0-316-19555-3 (first edition)
- OCLC: 11623085
- LC Class: PZ7.D9117 Lo 1985

Locked in Time is a 1985 suspense novel by Lois Duncan. The story centers around Nore, a seventeen-year-old girl who moves into a new home with her father and her new stepfamily. Soon after she meets her stepmother, stepbrother, and stepsister for the first time, Nore begins to suspect something is not quite right about her stepfamily. The author states that the novel explores some of the issues surrounding having eternal life. Duncan says she developed the idea for the novel when one of her daughters was thirteen years old and was having issues with her body image. Duncan mentions that her daughter was "taking everything out" on her, and she began to wonder what it would be like if her daughter never outgrew her adolescence.

The novel won several awards and honors including the 1988 South Carolina Young Adult Book Award, the 1989 Nevada Young Readers' Award, and the 1989–1990 Tennessee Volunteer State Book Award. In 2011, Locked in Time was reissued with updates to modernize the content. An audiobook based on the modernized text was released the same year.

== Plot ==
Seventeen-year-old Nore Robbins is staying with her father Chuck, stepmother Lisette Bergé, stepbrother Gabe, and stepsister Josie at their Louisiana plantation during the summer. Nore's father recently remarried after her mother died less than a year ago, and this was her first time meeting her stepmother, stepbrother, and stepsister. During her time there, she notices unusual behavior from her new family. During dinner her first evening, Josie mentions she was in Hartford when the Ringling Circus tent caught fire. Nore finds this odd considering Josie is a teenager and the event occurred in the 1940s. A woman at the supermarket, Elaine Shannon, thought she recognized Lisette from twenty years ago, but Lisette says that she must be thinking of her mother, who Lisette stated had the same name. Nore is puzzled by this statement because Bergé is not her maiden name, but a name she obtained from a previous marriage.

One day, Lisette tells Nore that Gabe invited her to go on one of his fishing trips. While out in the river, Gabe crashes the boat into a floating log and Nore falls into the water. Nore, who cannot swim, manages to grab onto a floating log and make her way back to land. Nore tries to tell her father that Gabe drove the boat into the log on purpose and left her there, but her father attributes it to an accident. While Nore is looking for evidence that might convince her father something is not right about the new family, she finds a very old picture of Lisette, Josie, and Gabe who look the same as they do now apart from their clothing and hairstyle.

Nore recalls having a conversation with Dave Parlange, who worked on the roof for her summer home, in which he tells her he knew someone named Charlie Lacouture who used to work there during the 1930s. Dave drives her to Charlie's house so she can learn more about the Bergé family. He tells them a family passed the house down to their daughter as a wedding gift when she married Henri Bergé. He says Henri and his wife died in the 1920s and their granddaughter moved back with her children during the Great Depression, after which he was hired there. He mentions that the woman valued her privacy and kept papers and private materials in a padlocked cabin. To account for her new family's unusual behavior and the information she has gathered, Nore suspects that her stepfamily does not age and that the padlocked cabin could hold important clues. Nore and Dave agree to meet the next day to discuss their next steps.

During the night, Nore sneaks into Lisette's room and grabs her keys to get into the cabin. There, she finds marriage certificates detailing Lisette's six previous marriages, and a journal entry in which Lisette discusses confronting a woman Henri Bergé was having an affair with. The woman offers Lisette eternal youth in exchange for her husband's company, and Lisette agrees on the condition her children join her as she does not want to outlive them. Nore takes the marriage certificates and journal back to her room, but not before Gabe sees her. Later that day, Nore's father is preparing for a business trip to New York. While she has left her room to try to convince her father of some of her discoveries, Gabe takes the evidence she has gathered. After Nore is unable to produce the evidence, Lisette drives Nore's father to the airport.

Before Dave and Nore are to meet, Nore runs up to the gate to the house and notices that it is padlocked. She develops a plan to climb a dovecote and jump off the fence, but decides to gather evidence of some of her discoveries from the cabin first. However, Gabe is inside the cabin waiting for her and prevents Nore from leaving. He explains to her Lisette's plan to kill both her and her father so that she could receive all of his inheritance, since both Nore and Lisette are included in his will. Lisette has killed several of her previous husbands instead of waiting for them to die a natural death, because she did not want them to notice that they never age. Dave, who has gotten over the gate by jumping off his car, barges in while Gabe is talking. Dave forces Gabe to go out and ask his mother for the key to the padlocked gate, but Lisette is outside the cabin waiting with a gun. Dave and Nore are locked in the cabin, and the cabin is set on fire. They are saved by Josie, who was given the keys to the cabin by Gabe. Gabe told Josie he and their mother were driving out to get the fire department, and he gave Josie the keys to let Dave and Nore out of the cabin after he has left with his mother. However, Gabe missed a curve on the road and crashed the car into a tree, killing him and his mother instantly. After the ordeal, the plantation was sold to the state of Louisiana to be converted into a historical museum. Josie moves in with Nore and Chuck at their New York home.

== Background ==
Locked in Time was first published in April 1985 by Little, Brown and Company in hardcover. Duncan came up with the idea for the plot when one of her daughters was thirteen years old and was having issues with her body image. She says her daughter was "taking everything out" on her, and although Duncan told herself that her daughter would grow out of this stage of her life, Duncan began to wonder what would happen if her daughter never outgrew her adolescence. Duncan's working title for the book was Clock with No Hands, although her editor suggested using Frozen in Time instead. Duncan did not like this title because the story is set in southern United States during the summer where anything frozen would melt, so they came up with a compromise and named the book Locked in Time.

In October 2011, the novel was reissued by Little, Brown in paperback with changes to modernize the content. Duncan stated the novel was easier to update than some of the other novels that were given the same treatment because much of the story was based on historical information, which does not change. She also says the story's setting, an isolated house "where people were not being exposed to the everyday life that teenagers know now" meant she did not have to make as many updates to the story. One change made in the updated edition was giving her characters cell phones, which presented a problem because it would mean characters could just call for help. To explain away the cell phone, Duncan wrote in the story that Nore's cell phone died when Gabe tried to drown Nore in the river. A 2011 audiobook, narrated by Jaselyn Blanchard, was published by Hachette Audio with the modernized text. Charli Osborne from the School Library Journal thought that the narrator "does a fine job with the soft Louisiana accents, giving each character a unique voice."

== Major themes ==
Duncan stated that the story examines the idea of having eternal life and some of the issues surrounding remaining the same physical age. Another theme mentioned by reviewers is a parent who does not believe what his or her child is trying to say when the child is in danger. This is a theme that appears several times in her books. In the novel, Nore tries to convince her father of some of her discoveries but he does not believe her. Cosette Kies wrote in her book Presenting Lois Duncan that Locked in Time combines the "horror of the occult" with threats of murder.

== Reception ==
Locked in Time was nominated for an Edgar Award for the Best Juvenile work in 1986. The same year, the International Reading Association and Children's Book Council included the novel in their Children's Choices list, which is based on books children vote as their favorite. Staff at the University of Iowa added Locked in Time to their 1986 Books for Young Adults list, which represents the popular reading choices among the grade 10–12 students surveyed in Iowa. In 1988, it won the South Carolina Young Adult Book Award, and the year after it won the Nevada Young Readers' Award in the Young Adult category. It also won the 1989–1990 Tennessee Volunteer State Book Award in the grade 10–12 category. In 1999, a paperback edition of Locked in Time published by Laurel-Leaf was selected as a Popular Paperback for Young Adults by the American Library Association.

Lois Duncan stated in 2009 that Locked in Time, along with Stranger with My Face, was the favorite young adult fiction novel she wrote. Betsy Hearne and Zena Sutherland of the Bulletin of the Center for Children's Books commented that the novel's "writing style is smooth," and the characters are strongly developed. They stated the plot skillfully blends fantasy and realism, and has "excellent pace and momentum". Sarah Hayes from The Times Literary Supplement did not feel the novel was "particularly stylish or complex: just readable, compelling, and very frightening." School Library Journal's Carolyn Gabbard Fugate thought that the story's setting at an old Louisiana mansion generates a mood of suspense and mystery. Leila Roy wrote in Kirkus Reviews that Nore's narration, which she stated was overdramatic and written more from the perspective of a senior citizen than a teenager, did not stop the novel from being entertaining. Mari Ness from Tor.com thought that the novel had a "surprisingly leisurely ending" for a Duncan novel, "where we actually know what happens to everyone." However, she felt "the setup has too many holes to be ultimately convincing," stating that the "practical issues of legal identification/money/property taxes are all vaguely acknowledged, but mostly handwaved."

== See also ==
- Tuck Everlasting – A book in which several characters also experience eternal life
