= Killing Mr. Griffin (film) =

- Promotional poster
- Genre: Thriller; Drama
- Based on: Killing Mr. Griffin by Lois Duncan
- Written by: Michael Angeli; Kathleen Rowell
- Directed by: Jack Bender
- Starring: Scott Bairstow; Amy Jo Johnson; Mario Lopez; Maitland Ward; Jay Thomas
- Music by: Christophe Beck
- Country of origin: United States
- Original language: English

Production
- Executive producers: Willard Carroll; Bonnie Raskin; Thomas L. Wilhite
- Producer: Suzy Beugen
- Cinematography: David Geddes
- Editor: Mark Melnick
- Running time: 89 minutes
- Production companies: Hyperion Pictures; Bonnie Raskin Productions; NBC Studios

Original release
- Network: NBC
- Release: April 7, 1997

Killing Mr. Griffin is a 1997 American television film directed by Jack Bender and starring Jay Thomas, Scott Bairstow, Mario Lopez, and Amy Jo Johnson. The film is based on a 1978 novel by Lois Duncan.

== Synopsis ==
Mr. Griffin is a stern high school English teacher with a reputation for having high standards and being tough on his students. When popular athlete Mark Kinney arrives to class late, Mr. Griffin berates him and threatens to expel him from class unless he begs to be allowed back. Mark pitches the idea of kidnapping and humiliating Mr. Griffin to his friends: Dave, Jeff, Tori, and Bree. They decide that to kidnap Mr. Griffin, they will need a decoy. Mark chooses Susan McConnell, a dedicated student who longs to be part of the popular crowd. Dave, whom Susan has a crush on, invites her to hang out with the group. They inform her of their plan, which Mark minimizes as a harmless senior prank, but Susan refuses to help. She eventually agrees after being humiliated by Mr. Griffin during class.

On Mark’s orders, Susan meets with Mr. Griffin after school. Once everyone has left, Susan walks him to his car in the empty parking lot, where he acknowledges he has been tough on her and recognizes her potential. Mark, Dave, and Jeff attack him and subdue him with chloroform. Susan runs away and refuses to participate any further. The group blindfolds and binds Mr. Griffin and takes him to the woods. Using a voice changer, they taunt him, while Tori and Bree video tape the incident, but Mark accidentally reveals his real voice, which alerts Mr. Griffin to his identity. He reveals that he has a heart condition and requires his medication, but they are unable to find it, believing it was lost during the struggle. Mark tells Mr. Griffin he will let him go if he agrees to stop being strict, but he angrily refuses. Mark finds Mr. Griffin’s medication on the ground but secretly places it in his pocket when Mr. Griffin continuously refuses. He convinces the group to leave Mr. Griffin in the woods until later that night. When they return, they discover that Mr. Griffin has died. Susan insists they all go to the police, but Mark refuses, arguing his death was an accident and that they will all go to jail. He convinces everyone to bury his body and cover up the crime.

Mr. Griffin is reported missing by his wife, and the police question Susan, as she was the last person to see him before his disappearance. Susan tells them she saw Mr. Griffin leave with his wife after their meeting; however, Mrs. Griffin points out that Susan is lying. Susan becomes consumed with guilt and pleads with Mark to tell the truth about what really happened. He tells Susan to meet at his house, so they can discuss what to do. While at his house, Tori arrives, and Susan hides in his room, where she discovers the video tape. She watches it and sees Mark placing Mr. Griffin’s medication in his pocket. Realizing that his death was not accidental, she takes the tape, but Mark follows her. Tori alerts the rest of the group, and they confront Mark. They go to the police, and Susan expresses her regret over what happened, citing her desperation for acceptance and belonging as her reason for going along.

== Cast ==
- Scott Bairstow as Mark Kinney
- Amy Jo Johnson as Susan McConnell
- Chris Young as Jeff Garrett
- Mario Lopez as Dave Ruggles
- Michelle Williams as Maya
- Jay Thomas as John Griffin
- Maitland Ward as Candice Lee
- Denise Dowse as Detective Pruitt
- Joey Zimmerman as Nicholas McConnell
- Paul Linke as The Coach
- Jennifer Hammon as Bree Gunderson
