= When the Bough Breaks (Duncan novel) =

1973 novel by Lois Duncan

- Author: Lois Duncan
- Language: English
- Published: 1973
- Publisher: Doubleday
- Pages: 182
- Dewey Decimal: 813/.5/4

When the Bough Breaks is a 1973 novel by Lois Duncan. In addition to Point of Violence (1966), it is one of two adult novels she composed, with the majority of her publications being young adult fiction.
