= Game of Danger =

Novel by Lois Duncan

- First edition cover art
- Author: Lois Duncan
- Language: English
- Genre: Thriller; young adult
- Publisher: Dodd, Mead, and Co.

Game of Danger is a 1962 thriller novel by Lois Duncan.

== Plot ==
Teenager Annie and her young brother Rob receive a phone call from their mother instructing them to leave their home in the middle of the night with an important letter. The two arrive at the bus terminal at 2 AM and leave for the home of a family friend at their mother's urging; meanwhile, newspaper headlines regarding Annie and Rob's father and his alleged communist ties begin to circulate. The children's embarking leads them on an odyssey to uncover the truth.

== Reception ==
A review published by Kirkus Reviews noted that: "The pieces of the puzzle take awhile to together [sic], but the is well worth the reader's time... This is melodrama that involves the reader all the way through."
