= The Twisted Window =

Novel by Lois Duncan

- First edition
- Author: Lois Duncan
- Language: English
- Genre: Suspense, young adult literature
- Publisher: Delacorte
- Publication date: 1987
- Publication place: United States
- Media type: Print (hardcover & paperback)
- Pages: 183 (first edition)
- ISBN: 0-385-29566-9 (first edition)
- OCLC: 412103713
- LC Class: PZ7.D9117 Tw 1987

The Twisted Window is a 1987 suspense novel by Lois Duncan. It is about Tracy, a high school student who agrees to help someone find his missing half-sister, who he says was kidnapped by his stepfather.

== Reception ==
The Twisted Window was nominated for an Edgar Award for the Best Juvenile work in 1988. The staff of the Books for Young Adults Program at the University of Iowa included the book in their 1988 Books for Young Adults list, which selects books based on their initial appeal and enjoyment to the grade 10–12 students surveyed. Zena Sutherland, writing for the Bulletin of the Center for Children's Books, stated that the "plot and characterization have substance and nuance, and the author deftly builds tension and leads the reader to an expectation (amply fulfilled) of an ending that at first seems surprising--until the reader sees that Duncan has carefully led to its dramatic twist." In a starred review, Kirkus Reviews felt that "though her writing is undistinguished, it never cheats or disappoints, allowing the reader to believe even this most melodramatic of stories."
