= Chapters: My Growth as a Writer =

1982 autobiography by Lois Duncan

- First edition
- Author: Lois Duncan
- Language: English
- Genre: Non-fiction
- Publisher: Little, Brown
- Publication date: March 1982
- Publication place: United States
- Media type: Print (hardcover)
- Pages: 263
- ISBN: 0-316-19552-9
- OCLC: 7977698
- LC Class: PS3554.U464 Z463

Chapters: My Growth as a Writer is a 1982 autobiography by Lois Duncan.

== Contents ==
In Chapters: My Growth as a Writer, Duncan describes how she included real life experiences in her short stories. Her stories include "The Fairy in the Woods", which she wrote when she was 10 and was rejected by all of the magazines she submitted the story to, and "The Reason", which she wrote at age 13 and was accepted for publication. Duncan also recounts her transition from writing short stories and poems for magazines to writing her first books.

== Reception ==
In 1982, the novel was selected as an American Library Association Best Book for Young Adults. Terry Lawhead from the School Library Journal thought the autobiography "reads easily, like one of her novels" and that "she has a good hold on her adolescence". Zena Sutherland, writing for the Bulletin of the Center for Children's Books stated that Duncan "writes with candor and discernment, in an easy, flowing style." Iris McClellan Tiedt wrote in the English Journal that the book "is good reading for anyone, but it offers an especially wonderful model for aspiring young authors." She stated she has 'often recommended it to individual students of promise for its realism, its account of persistence (Duncan submitted consistently for three years before she received that first acceptance), its wisdom ("Every experience you have is stored away inside you, to draw upon as you need it for your writing"), its authentic voice, its record of growth over time.'
