= Charles Gorman =

Charles Gorman may refer to:

- Charles Gorman (actor) (1865–1928), American actor
- Charles Gorman (speed skater) (1897–1940), Canadian speed skater
- Buddy Gorman (Charles J. Gorman, 1921–2010), American actor

== See also ==
- Charlie Gorman (disambiguation)
