= Joseph Janney Steinmetz =

American commercial photographer (1905–1985)

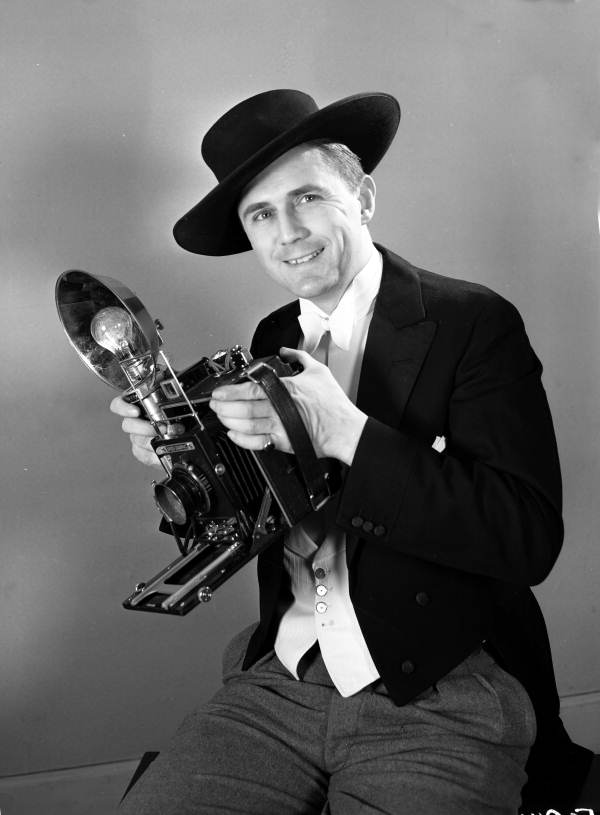
Joseph Janney Steinmetz photographed for Life magazine's "pictures" column in Philadelphia, December 6, 1940

Joseph Janney Steinmetz (October 7, 1905 – September 6, 1985) was an American commercial photographer whose images appeared in publications including the Saturday Evening Post, Life, Look, Time, Holiday, Collier's, and Town & Country. He documented scenes of American life including the wealthy and middle-class Americans, including Floridians.

== Biography and career ==
In the Sarasota area his photographic subjects included Emmett Kelly, Elden Rowland, Eric Hodgins, and the Hilton Leech House and Amagansett Art School. Other photographs include pictures of artist Ben Stahl, Ringling Circus choreographer George Balanchine, filming on the set of On an Island with You on Anna Maria Island, president of Coca-Cola Robert Winship Woodruff, Naval Photography School (NAS) in Pensacola, baseball legend Ted Williams, novelist MacKinlay Kantor, the set of Wind Across the Everglades, Karl Wallenda, Emmett Kelly, Lou Jacobs, Billy Bowlegs III, Arthur M. Young flying his model helicopter, and Ringling Circus clowns.

Steinmetz was born in Philadelphia. He became interested in photography when he received his first camera as a gift from his parents on Christmas in 1912. His first professional camera was a Leica model B. Steinmetz moved from Philadelphia to Sarasota in 1941. He married Lois Foley. Lois Duncan was their daughter. Steinmetz died in Sarasota at age 79.

== Gallery ==
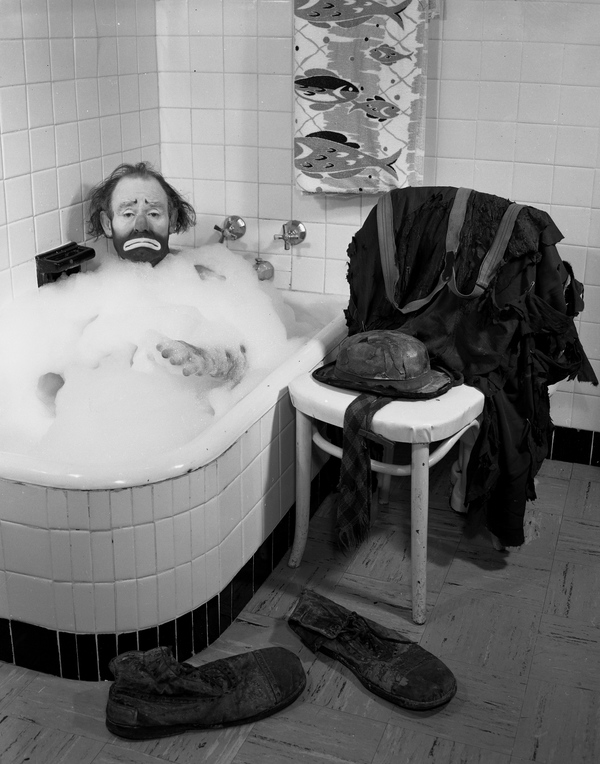
Circus clown Emmett Kelly in a bubble bath

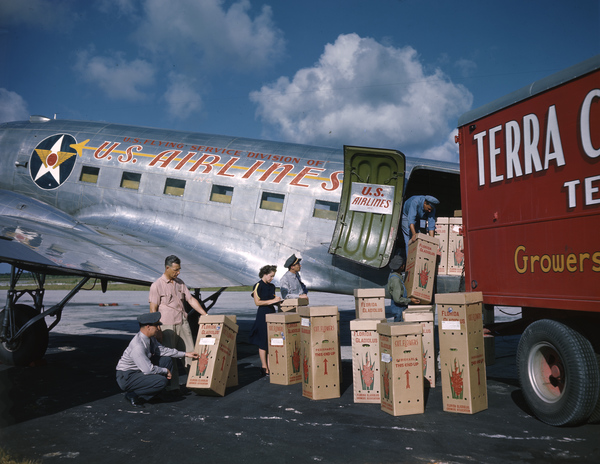
Terra Ceia Island Farms gladiolus being loaded onto a U. S. Airlines plane at the Sarasota Airport, May 8, 1947

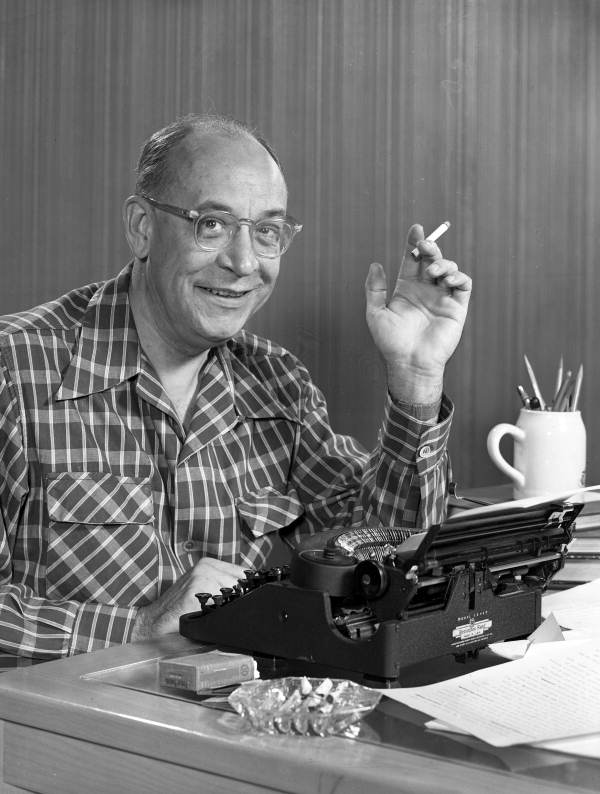
Portrait of author Eric Hodgins
