= Hotel for Dogs (film) =

2009 film by Thor Freudenthal

- Theatrical release poster
- Directed by: Thor Freudenthal
- Screenplay by: Jeff Lowell; Bob Schooley; Mark McCorkle
- Based on: Hotel for Dogs by Lois Duncan
- Produced by: Lauren Shuler Donner; Jonathan Gordon; Ewan Leslie; Jason Clark
- Starring: Emma Roberts; Jake T. Austin; Kyla Pratt; Lisa Kudrow; Kevin Dillon; Don Cheadle
- Cinematography: Michael Grady
- Edited by: Sheldon Kahn
- Music by: John Debney
- Production companies: Nickelodeon Movies; The Donners' Company; The Montecito Picture Company
- Distributed by: DreamWorks Pictures (through Paramount Pictures)
- Release date: January 16, 2009
- Running time: 100 minutes
- Country: United States
- Language: English
- Budget: $35 million
- Box office: $117.3 million

Hotel for Dogs is a 2009 American family comedy film based on the 1971 novel by Lois Duncan. It was directed by Thor Freudenthal and written by Jeff Lowell, Bob Schooley, and Mark McCorkle. It stars Emma Roberts, Jake T. Austin, Kyla Pratt, Lisa Kudrow, Kevin Dillon, and Don Cheadle. The film tells the story of two orphaned siblings living in foster care who secretly take in stray dogs along with their family dog at a vacant hotel.

Shooting began in November 2007 and took place in the cities of Los Angeles and Universal City, California. The dogs in the film were trained for several months before shooting began. Nearly eighty boys auditioned for the role of Bruce before Austin was ultimately selected. John Debney composed the score for the film.

Hotel for Dogs was released in the United States by DreamWorks Pictures (through Paramount Pictures) on January 16, 2009. It received mixed reviews from critics and was a box-office success, grossing $117.3 million on a $35 million budget.

== Plot ==
Orphaned siblings Andi and Bruce swindle a pawn shop owner in order to buy food for their dog, Friday. However, they are quickly caught and brought to the police station where they get picked up by their social worker, Bernie Wilkins who takes them back to their foster parents, Lois and Carl Scudder, who do not appear to care for either Andi, Bruce, or even Friday. Despite his sympathy for the siblings, Bernie warns them against deliberately getting into trouble in order to escape their foster parents.

The next morning, Friday leaves to look for food, only to get caught by animal control. Andi and Bruce go into a local pet store to see if anybody has seen him, and meet Dave and Heather, who advise them to check the pound. They learn that Friday is there but cannot be claimed without their parents present, so they bribe one of the guards to get Friday back. While walking home, they flee from a crime scene and find Friday taking shelter in an abandoned hotel, where they find a tiny Boston Terrier and an English Mastiff. They name them Georgia and Lenny and leave Friday at the hotel for the night.

Bruce stays at the hotel to keep the dogs quiet, while Andi gets some food for the dogs, where she runs into Dave and Heather again. Andi lies to them that their parents often rescue dogs, causing Dave to ask her to take in three more dogs that nobody seems to want to adopt, which she reluctantly agrees. With six dogs to look after, the friends think about getting the hotel into a decent state to accommodate the dogs' needs, with help from a local boy named Mark, and rescue more stray dogs to occupy the hotel.

Eventually, Dave invites Andi to a party, which she accepts. Meanwhile, Bruce ends up interrogated by Carl and Lois, having been caught stealing a hairdryer. The party is ruined for Andi when she bumps into Jason, an old acquaintance who reveals to everyone that she and Bruce are orphans. Bruce manages to escape his house, only to find out the hotel is in chaos; Lois and Carl follow him there. The dogs (including Friday) are found and sent to the pound, while Bruce and Andi are taken away by the police. When Lois and Carl refuse to take Andi and Bruce back, Bernie is forced by state law to send them to separate foster homes.

The dogs are all scheduled to be put down the next day, but Friday manages to escape. He rushes over to find Dave, Heather, and Mark, who in turn, find Andi and Bruce. Meanwhile, Bernie explores the hotel where he finds a dog named Harley, who had managed to avoid getting caught by animal control the previous night. Bernie then realizes why the kids loved doing what they did. Andi and Bruce manage to break into the pound and release the dogs in an attempt to get them across the county line, where they will be safe. However, the dogs instead make their way back towards the hotel, believing it to be their real home. The strange event attracts the attention of citizens, reporters, and the police, who follow the dogs to the hotel. Before the animal control officers attempt to capture the dogs again, Bernie appears and tells everyone about how Bruce and Andi managed to create a family of dogs. He introduces all the dogs who live at the hotel and tells the heartfelt stories of their past owners from a registration book he found and written out by Bruce, which wins over the crowd and the police allow the children to keep the dogs together.

As people explore the hotel, Bernie reveals to an overjoyed Andi and Bruce that he and his wife have decided to adopt them. Sometime later, thanks to the entire city's generosity, the hotel re-opens as a grand "Hotel For Dogs", where people can either adopt strays or board their dogs, while Andi, Bruce, and Friday happily settle into their new family.

== Cast ==
- Emma Roberts as Andi, Bruce's older sister who later becomes Dave's girlfriend. Roberts was cast in late 2007 and "knew as soon as she started reading the script for Hotel for Dogs she wanted to be part of the movie".
- Jake T. Austin as Bruce, a preteen orphan who, along with his older sister, Andi, has lived with a number of foster parents following the death of their biological parents before ending up with Lois and Carl Scudder. He has a knack for mechanics. His inventions help keep the stray dogs living at the hotel fed and entertained while he and his sister are away. Nearly 80 boys tried out for the part before Austin was cast as Bruce.
- Johnny Simmons as Dave, the young manager of a local pet store who helps Andi and Bruce rescue stray dogs and care for them at the hotel. Later, he becomes Andi's boyfriend and the new manager at the Hotel for Dogs.
- Kyla Pratt as Heather, an employee at the pet store who also wants to help rescue stray dogs, and later becomes the new guide at the Hotel For Dogs, as well as becoming Mark's girlfriend. Pratt joined the film after she learned that Don Cheadle was also working on the project. She said in an interview that "they were telling me about all the different people who were gonna be in it, and I saw Don Cheadle's name, and I'm like, oh, absolutely". She also said of her co-star Emma Roberts that "Emma is so much fun to be around and she's hilarious. Emma's great because I wasn't sure how everything was going to be, because I was older than the other actors in the movie".
- Troy Gentile as Mark, a 14-year-old kid who lives near Andi and Bruce and is eager to help with the dogs at the hotel. Later, he becomes Heather's boyfriend.
- Don Cheadle as Bernie Wilkins, a sympathetic social worker who tries his best to find a home for Andi and Bruce and to prevent them from being placed with separate foster families. Later, he becomes Andi and Bruce's adoptive father at the end. Cheadle joined the cast in September 2007. He described the film as "an opportunity to do a film that my kids can see" and praised both Emma Roberts and Jake T. Austin as being "really professional. They showed up to do the work and were serious and took it seriously and had acting coaches and everything".
- Robinne Lee as Carol Wilkins, Bernie's wife who initially tells her husband not to get too emotionally involved with the children he works with despite showing deep sympathy and care for them as well. Later, she becomes Andi and Bruce's adoptive mother.
- Lisa Kudrow as Lois Scudder, Andi and Bruce's controlling, wannabe rock star former foster mother. Kudrow signed up for the film in October 2007. It was her first time working with dogs in a film. She said that her co-star Emma Roberts "was one of the draws for me to do this".
- Kevin Dillon as Carl Scudder, Andi and Bruce's former foster father and an aging rocker who refuses to give up on his dreams of becoming a star. Dillon was cast in November 2007. Dillon said in an interview that singing and playing guitar during the band practice scenes was "one of the things that was the most fun" while filming.
- Eric Edelstein as ACO Max; a cruel, cold hearted animal pound worker, who along with his partner Jake, does everything in his power to lock up every stray dog in the city, even Andi and Bruce's own dog, Friday.
- Ajay Naidu as ACO Jake; a cruel, cold hearted animal pound worker, like his partner Max, who does everything in his power to lock up and put down every stray dog they find and capture in the city.
- Yvette Nicole Brown as Ms. Camwell; was seen as either Mark's mom or boss.
- Gregory Sporleder as ACO Herb Dooley; the chief and boss of the animal pound workers, who stops at nothing to capture stray dogs, put them in cages, and then, have them put to sleep.
- Maximiliano Hernández as Officer Mike; a strict, yet caring, police officer, who along with his partner Jeff, has been keeping an eye on Andi and Bruce since the time they ripped a pawn shop owner off. At the end, he allows Andi and Bruce to keep the dogs.
- Andre Ware as Officer Jeff; Officer Mike's similar partner who has been keeping an eye on Andi and Bruce since the time they ripped a pawn shop owner off. At the end, he allows Andi and Bruce to keep the dogs as well.
- Jonathan Klein as Evan; a pawn shop owner whom Andi ripped off by selling him a rock in a phone box for twenty-seven dollars at the beginning.
- Kenny Vibert as Jason; an old acquaintance of Andi and Bruce, who accidentally notifies everyone that Andi is an orphan living with the Scudders in the same building his grandmother lives in at the party.
- Cosmo the Dog as Friday, Andi and Bruce's pet dog. He is a Jack Russell Terrier.
- Susie and Buster as Cooper, a bull dog who likes to chew on anything.

== Production ==
=== Development ===
It draws an interesting parallel between the kids and the dogs. Although I was aware that it was a risk to jump into directing my first feature working with both kids and animals, I recognized the importance and relevance of the story and thought it was worth it.
—Thor Freudenthal

The film rights to Lois Duncan's novel were acquired by DreamWorks in June 2005. According to Thor Freudenthal, DreamWorks first approached him about working on the film after a short film which he had worked on played at the Sundance Film Festival. Freudenthal said that DreamWorks "really embraced and responded to" the film and sent him an early version of the script. Nickelodeon Movies would also join in to produce the film with DreamWorks. He was initially hesitant to sign onto the project, balking at the seemingly shallow title. However, he stated that after reading the script that he "realized you don't think much about the logistics involved" and saw deeper messages and more complex aspects of the film. Freudenthal was attracted to the "urban fairytale aspect" of the film, noting in an interview:

It's basically these unwanted children, these unwanted animals coming together and making their own place in their own home. That's what I liked. It wasn't the fact that it was Fox Terriers and things like that. So that sort of made me sign on and be ready for it.

A producer of the film, Lauren Shuler Donner, is also an activist and dog lover, and was convinced that the book's message about the importance of family "made the novel an ideal property to bring to the big screen". Shuler Donner insisted that the movie "stand out from other family movies visually" and it was Freudenthal's background in animation that gave him an edge over other directors. According to her, "It was the way he framed shots, the way he moved the camera, the use of color, the use of light. He's very visually savvy and very specific." Much of the screenplay was handled by Bob Schooley and Mark McCorkle, creators of Kim Possible for Disney Channel.

=== Casting ===
Emma Roberts was cast in August 2007 to play teenage older sister Andi. Freudenthal began his search for a young actress "who could carry a whole movie" and settled on then-16 year old Roberts. Ewan Leslie, a producer of the film, said in an interview of Roberts that she "is one of those young actors whose face just lights up the screen and she has the ability to play a wide range of emotions without any dialogue."

Filmmakers conducted a nationwide search for an actor to play Bruce, Andi's whimsical and inventive younger brother. Jake T. Austin auditioned late, after nearly 80 other boys had tried out for the part. Jason Clark, another producer of the film, stated that Austin "was amazing on every level. He played the emotional beats very well, felt the role and also understood timing."

The rest of the roles were cast in the following months. Don Cheadle, who plays Andi and Bruce's protective social worker, joined the film in September 2007. Lisa Kudrow was cast as the siblings' foster mother in October, and Johnny Simmons was cast that same month as Dave. Kyla Pratt was chosen to play Heather soon after.

The dogs were carefully cast as well. Filmmakers wanted a variety of breeds with different colors and facial structures "so that their look suggested their personality." Freudenthal said that he deliberately chose both very small and very large dogs to create a contrast similar to the characters of Lenny and George in the John Steinbeck novella Of Mice and Men. The majority of the dogs cast were rescues. The lead dog, who plays Friday, was rescued about six months before shooting began. Crew members also helped to find adoptive homes for the abandoned dogs and several adopted dogs themselves.

=== Filming ===
A Hollywood animal trainer, Mark Forbes, was hired to prepare the dogs before shooting began. Forbes and his team began working with the dogs about four months before shooting. Those dogs with no prior training were first taught basic commands, such as "sit" and "roll over." They were then trained to respond to more complex commands and learned to retrieve objects and to wave.

The dogs sit in replicas of cars surrounded by fans that simulate driving on a highway with the wind blowing.

The next phase of training involved using the dogs' body language to express emotions: sadness, for example, was conveyed when a dog tucked its tail between its legs. Finally, the dogs were taken to public places to review the commands that they had learned. The purpose of this was to ensure that the dogs would perform in any location. According to Forbes, "You want the dogs to sense that everything is fine and they'll still get their treat regardless of the location. The set becomes just another place for them to go." The trainers worked with the human actors as well to "familiarize them with how the dogs behave and create a comfort level between the human and the dog actors." The dogs were also trained to interact with the various gadgets in the film with early prototypes built by the special effects team.

Special effects supervisor Michael Lantieri enlisted to create the various contraptions invented by Bruce throughout the film to keep the dogs fed. One such gadget is a device which can be operated by the dogs to throw a ball to be fetched.

The first was a simple spring-loaded device that throws a ball and spoon down hallways, while the second device was a bit more sophisticated. 'This fetching machine uses a bicycle and a hand from a mannequin. It is timed so that the wheels turn, and the ball is magnetic so it sticks in the hand, which comes round and launches the object so the dog can chase it,' explains Lantieri. 'Things can seem simple when you read them, but making it work on screen has to do with timing, the weight of the ball and how the ball stays in the hand until you want it to move.'

Other devices built for the film include a feeding machine that drops food into each of the dogs' bowls on a timed schedule, a vending machine filled with shoes and other chew toys, a room filled with doors whose doorbells go off on their own, and another containing a replica of a car surrounded by fans which simulates for the dogs the experience of placing their heads through an open car window while driving.

All of the contraptions were created using objects that might actually be found in an abandoned hotel, and in such a way that they looked like they had been created by a gifted 13-year-old boy.

== Release ==
=== Box office ===
Hotel for Dogs was released in Puerto Rico on January 15, 2009, and in the United States on January 16, 2009, to 3,271 theaters. It earned $17,012,212 in its opening weekend, the 5th-highest-grossing film of that weekend behind Paul Blart: Mall Cop, Gran Torino, and others. It remained in release for 19 weeks and earned a total of $116,983,275 worldwide. It is estimated to have earned $22,500,000 total over the four-day weekend.

Moviefone called the opening, "pretty good for a fairly anonymous little family film opening against a higher-profile family film." As of August 2011, the film has a reported box office gross of $73 million for the United States and $44 million internationally, for a total of $117 million.

=== Critical reception ===
On Rotten Tomatoes, the film has an approval rating of 46% based on reviews from 123 critics, with an average rating of 5.30/10. The site's consensus stated: "Hotel for Dogs may appeal to children and dog lovers, but it's ultimately contrived, predictable and simplistic". On Metacritic, the film received a score of 51 out of 100, based on 25 reviews, indicating "mixed or average" reviews. Audiences surveyed by CinemaScore gave the film a grade "A−" on scale of A to F.

Roger Ebert gave the film 2.5 out of 4 stars and described it as "a sweet, innocent family movie about stray dogs that seem as well-trained as Olympic champions". Kent Turner, writing for School Library Journal, stated that while the book is "utterly realistic", the film is "fantastic" and thus fundamentally different. Stephen Holden, writing for The New York Times, wrote that the film "is loaded with enough stupid pet and human tricks to satisfy David Letterman for years to come".

=== Accolades ===
The movie tied with Up for Best Feature Film at the 24th Genesis Awards.

=== Video game ===
A video game based on the film was released on January 6, 2009, for Microsoft Windows, Wii, and Nintendo DS and published by 505 Games.

=== Home media ===
The film was released on DVD and Blu-ray on April 28, 2009. It sold 773,000 units in the first week, bringing in $13,584,527 in revenue. As per the latest figures, 1,778,736 DVD units have been sold, translating to more than $30 million in revenue. This does not include Blu-ray sales. The film was re-released on DVD on January 24, 2017.

== Soundtrack ==
The score to Hotel for Dogs was composed by John Debney, who recorded his score at the Eastwood Scoring Stage at Warner Brothers.
