= Peggy (novel) =

1970 novel by Lois Duncan

- First edition cover art
- Author: Lois Duncan
- Language: English
- Subject: Peggy Shippen
- Genre: Historical novel
- Published: June 1970
- Publisher: Little, Brown and Company
- Pages: 249
- ISBN: 978-0-316-19544-7

Peggy is a 1970 historical novel by Lois Duncan. It is a semi-fictionalized account of the life of Peggy Shippen, the second wife of General Benedict Arnold, a prominent figure in Philadelphia after the American Revolutionary War.

== See also ==
- Peggy Shippen
