= Ransom (Duncan novel) =

1966 novel by Lois Duncan

- First edition cover art
- Author: Lois Duncan
- Language: English
- Genre: Thriller; young adult
- Publisher: Doubleday
- Pages: 172
- OCLC: 1286149
- LC Class: 66013196

Ransom (reprinted under the title Five Were Missing) is a 1966 thriller novel by Lois Duncan. Its plot follows a group of children who are kidnapped and held hostage on a school bus. It marked Duncan's first foray into the suspense and thriller genre, and was nominated for an Edgar Allan Poe Award.

== Plot ==
Marianne Paget, Bruce Kirtland, Glenn Kirtland, Jesse French, and Dexter Barton, students in Albuquerque, New Mexico, are abducted on their school bus by a gang of kidnappers. The criminals demand $15,000 ransoms for each child, which their respective parents scramble to produce. Meanwhile, the five high schoolers attempt to find a way to escape the situation themselves. The high schoolers are forced to work together to escape, and while doing so, some relationships are created, while others are destroyed.

== Adaptations ==
Held for Ransom was written and directed by Lee Stanley and Nickolas Perry. Production began in 1999 and was filmed over a period of 3 weeks, releasing November 14, 2000.

== Accolades ==
- Nominated – Edgar Award (1967)
