= Debutante Hill =

1958 novel by Lois Duncan

- 1958 p/b edition (publ. Pyramid Books)
- Author: Lois Duncan
- Language: English
- Genre: Young adult
- Published: 1958
- Publisher: Dodd, Mead and Company
- ISBN: 978-1-939-60100-1
- Dewey Decimal: 813.54

Debutante Hill is a 1958 novel by Lois Duncan, originally published by Dodd, Mead and Company. Unlike her later novels which mainly focused on the supernatural and suspense, it tells the story of an upper-class young woman whose social life undergoes rapid change when her father forbids her to become a debutante in their insular town.
