= Love Song for Joyce =

1958 novel by Lois Duncan

- First edition cover art
- Author: Lois Duncan
- Language: English
- Genre: Novel
- Published: September 2, 1958
- Publisher: Funk & Wagnalls
- Pages: 244

Love Song for Joyce is a 1958 début novel by Lois Duncan, under the pen name Lois Kerry. The plot follows a young woman's struggle transitioning from adolescence to adulthood after moving from her hometown in Florida to attend a North Carolina college. The plot appears to be semi-autobiographical, bearing similarities to Duncan's own life. (Note: Duncan, like the novel's protagonist, Joyce, was a native of Florida who relocated to North Carolina to attend college (Duncan enrolled at Duke University; the fictional college in the novel is named Denton College).)

== Plot ==
Joyce Arnold is a young woman in Florida who relocates from her hometown to North Carolina to attend Deton College. Her close friend Margo, and boyfriend, Frank, have both chosen to enroll in universities in Florida. Upon her relocation to North Carolina, Joyce is forced into an entirely new environment, and must learn to navigate adulthood and her own newfound independence.
