= The Third Eye (novel) =

1984 novel by Lois Duncan

- First edition
- Author: Lois Duncan
- Language: English
- Genre: Young adult fiction
- Publisher: Dell Books
- Publication date: January 1984
- Publication place: California
- Media type: Print (Hardcover)
- Pages: 220
- ISBN: 0-316-19553-7
- OCLC: 10277836
- LC Class: PZ7.D9117 Tj 1984

The Third Eye is a 1984 novel for young adults by Lois Duncan. It is a supernatural/suspense novel which tells the story of a girl with a psychic gift.

== Plot summary ==
The protagonist of The Third Eye is eighteen-year-old Karen Connors. While in high school, she began dating Tim, a popular classmate. For the first time, Karen begins to feel as though she is finally fitting in. Her mother is pleased that she is dating Tim, as she has always pushed Karen to fit in and be popular.

Karen gets a job as a babysitter for the Zenner family, watching Stephanie and her older brother, Bobby. Bobby leaves to go and play with his friends, but doesn’t show up at lunchtime. Karen asks nearby families if they had seen him, and when they all reply they haven’t, she contacts the police.

Officer Ronald Wilson arrived to question Karen, and the first thing she notices about him is that he has vivid blue eyes and seems much too young to be a police officer. Wilson does not seem too concerned about the disappearance, saying that Bobby was probably at a friend's house. Karen starts having visions of where Bobby is, seeing he is unconscious and stuck in a box. When Bobby's parents arrive home, Bobby is still missing. The policeman returns to the Zenner home. Karen realizes that the box she saw in her vision is the trunk of a car, and that the car is headed her way. She also realizes that the car she envisions belongs to her boyfriend, Tim. When he arrives to take her home, she confronts Tim, and they find Bobby in the trunk, unconscious, but alive.

Afterward, Karen is asked by Officer Wilson if she would be willing to help locate a missing girl named Carla Sanchez. Going against her parents' wishes, Karen agrees to help. Officer Wilson drives Karen to Ms. Sanchez’s house that afternoon. Alone in Carla's bedroom, Karen picks up various items of clothing and toys in an attempt to receive a vision of Carla. After this approach fails, Karen and Officer Wilson leave the Sanchez residence. While in the car with Officer Wilson, Karen receives psychic messages, leading them to a riverbank. They find a pair of sandals and a bicycle that belong to Carla. Karen feels weak and nauseated. Karen then has a vision of the events that led up to Carla's death. Police later find her body in the river.

Among the following events, Tim breaks up with Karen and graduates high school. That summer, Karen is hired at a daycare center. She enjoys her job, and particularly bonds with an outgoing toddler named Matthew, who has unusually vivid blue eyes. Karen remarks on his eyes to Matthew's mother when she comes to pick him up, and the mother tells her that the unusual color comes from her husband's side of the family, and they seem to be a dominant genetic trait, as she herself has brown eyes.

On her way to work one day, a lady pulls over and asks for directions to the daycare center. The woman offers Karen a ride, and Karen agrees. The lady driving the car says she is named Betty Smith. When Betty calls Karen by name, Karen becomes suspicious as she had not introduced herself. Believing Betty has other intentions, Karen tries to escape from the car. The doors are locked. Betty drives her to an apartment where a guy named Joe ties her down and hits her head on a stove, knocking her out. After Jed and Betty leave, Karen is visited by a vision of a little girl that she feels compelled to protect. She cannot save her while she is unconscious, so she forces herself out of her slumber to find that she is bound and gagged in the apartment with nobody to save her. She has almost lost all hope when she sees the little girl again, who points to the smoke alarm. (The little girl still has yet to speak or show her face. She keeps her back turned to Karen, so she can only see her blonde hair.) Karen then uses her feet to start a fire, which triggers the fire alarm, getting the attention of the apartment manager.

She then learns that Betty and Jed stole most of the babies at the daycare center. One of these babies was the blue eyed Matthew, who is revealed to be Officer Ron Wilson's nephew. Karen's mother wants her to leave on a vacation to San Francisco, but Karen decides to help Ron locate the missing babies instead.

Karen and Ron visit psychic Anne Summers, who had been shot because she was closing in on the kidnappings. Luckily, she held up a bag with a broken meat cleaver in it to slow down the shot, which would have hit her in the heart. Karen knows she is the only one who can help locate the children now.

Karen then decides to help Ron, and envisions the children on the way to Colorado. Karen and Ron camp out at the state park, where she discovers she is falling in love with Ron. The next morning, they arrive at the house in which the babies are being held. They find out that Betty and Jed stole the babies to illegally sell them.

Ron goes up to the house to try to get a look at the babies when Karen has a vision of a dog guarding the house. Ron was terrified of dogs, so Karen had to go warn him. As she gets to him, the dog attacks, Ron shoots him, and Karen screams. Jed then comes out and shoots Ron in the shoulder. They were taken inside, and Karen tries to keep Ron from losing much blood. Soon, the police come and rescue them both, returning all of the missing babies. Karen’s mother was the one who alerted the police, after receiving a vision.

Karen's mother then tells her how she has always been psychic too, but does not want to be thought of as a freak, so she tried to hide it. She also reveals that she had never been popular and that her first date was with Karen’s father. She wants Karen to hide it as well and try to find someone to fall in love with her. She also explains that she had seen Karen in visions before she was born, and these visions saved her life twice. Karen then tells her mother that she will find someone who loves and accepts her just as she is, and that she intends to use this gift for the good. Later, Karen again sees a vision of the little blond girl, who she now realizes is her own future daughter. She reaches out to her with her mind, asking her who her daddy will be. The girl in the vision then turns around to face Karen for the first time, revealing vivid blue eyes exactly like Matthew's and Officer Ron Wilson's.
