= Who Killed My Daughter? =

Book by Lois Duncan

- Author: Lois Duncan
- Language: English
- Genre: Nonfiction
- Published: 1992
- Publisher: Delacorte
- Pages: 304
- ISBN: 978-0-385-30781-9
- Dewey Decimal: 364.1/523/0978961

Who Killed My Daughter? is a 1992 non-fiction book by Lois Duncan detailing Duncan's search for answers in the then-unsolved murder of her eighteen-year-old daughter, Kaitlyn Arquette, in July 1989.

== Summary ==
On July 16, 1989, Arquette was shot to death while coming home from a friend's house in Albuquerque, New Mexico. Duncan conducted her own investigations, which included talking to her daughter's friends, and visiting a psychic. While the police believed the shooting to be random, Duncan believed the killing was by a Vietnamese gang running an insurance fraud and drug operation in which Arquette's boyfriend was involved. However, in 2021, fifty-five-year-old Paul Apodaca admitted to, and was later convicted of, the murder of Arquette along with two other women.
