= The Middle Sister =

1960 novel by Lois Duncan

- First edition cover art
- Author: Lois Duncan
- Language: English
- Genre: Novel; young adult
- Published: July 18, 1960
- Publisher: Dodd, Mead and Company
- ISBN: 978-1-939-60140-7

The Middle Sister is a 1960 novel by Lois Duncan.

== Plot ==
Teenage Ruth Porter, the middle child of two sisters, struggles with her tall and thin stature in contrast to her siblings, especially the older Janet. Ruth begins to imitate Janet, who aims for a career as a theatre actress.

== Critical reception ==
Kirkus Reviews published a review of the novel, calling it "Well handled, this story of the ugly duckling should have a direct appeal to teen-age girls who will easily identify with the plight of struggling Ruth."
