= Lois Duncan =

American novelist, journalist (1934–2016)

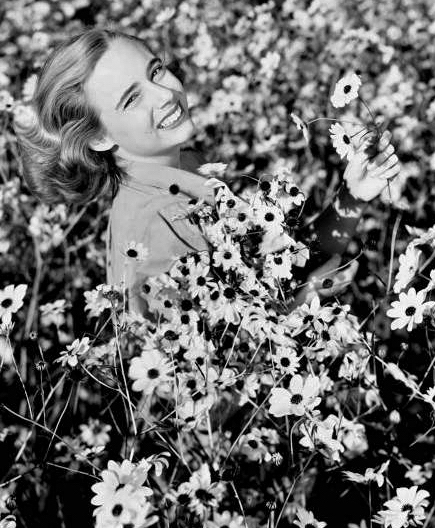
- Duncan in 1950
- Born: Lois Duncan Steinmetz; April 28, 1934; Philadelphia, Pennsylvania, U.S.
- Died: June 15, 2016 (aged 82); Bradenton, Florida, U.S.
- Education: University of New Mexico
- Occupations: Writer; journalist
- Spouses: Joseph Cardozo (m. 1953; div. 1962) Donald Arquette (m. 1965)
- Children: 5
- Relatives: Joseph Janney Steinmetz (father)
- Writing career
- Pen name: Lois Kerry
- Period: 1947–2016
- Genres: Young-adult; mystery fiction; supernatural fiction; children's; poetry; picture books
- Notable awards: 1992 Margaret A. Edwards Award; 2015 Grand Master Award from the Mystery Writers of America
- Website: loisduncan.arquettes.com (defunct)

Lois Duncan Steinmetz (April 28, 1934 – June 15, 2016), known as Lois Duncan, was an American writer, novelist, poet, and journalist. She is best known for her young-adult novels, and has been credited by historians as a pioneering figure in the development of young-adult fiction, particularly in the genres of horror, thriller, and suspense.

The daughter of professional photographers Lois and Joseph Janney Steinmetz, Duncan began writing at a young age, publishing two early novels under the pen name Lois Kerry. Several of her novels, including Hotel for Dogs (1971), I Know What You Did Last Summer (1973), Summer of Fear (1976), and the controversial Killing Mr. Griffin (1978), have been adapted into films.

In addition to her novels and children's books, Duncan published several collections of poetry and nonfiction, including Who Killed My Daughter? (1992), which detailed the 1989 unsolved murder of Duncan's teenaged daughter, Kaitlyn; the murderer was apprehended in 2021, five years after Duncan died. She received the 1992 Margaret Edwards Award from the American Library Association for her contribution to writing for teens. After her daughter's murder, Duncan distanced herself from the thriller and horror genres, shifting her focus to picture books and novels aimed for young children. Her last published work, a sequel to Who Killed My Daughter? titled One to the Wolves, was published in 2013.

== Early life ==
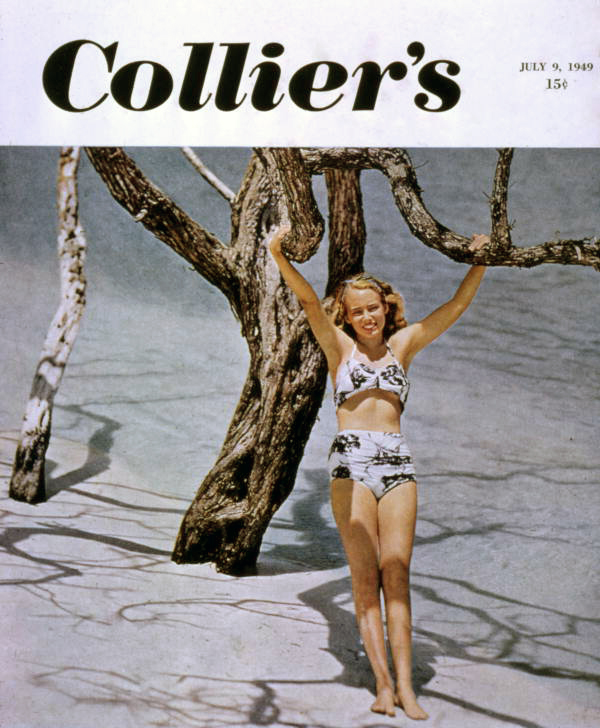
Duncan on the cover of a 1949 issue of Collier's, photographed by her father

Lois Duncan Steinmetz was born on April 28, 1934, in Philadelphia, Pennsylvania, the first child of Lois Duncan (née Foley) and Joseph Janney Steinmetz. Duncan had one younger brother, William Janney "Billy" Steinmetz. Both of Duncan's parents were professional magazine photographers, who took photos for the Ringling Bros. and Barnum & Bailey Circus.

She spent her early life in Pennsylvania, relocating in her late childhood to Sarasota, Florida, where her parents resumed their employment as circus photographers. In Florida, she spent her youth among circus performers, including The Doll Family. Her experience growing up in this environment eventually served as the basis of her picture books The Circus Comes Home (1993) and Song of the Circus (2002).

Duncan described herself as a "shy, fat little girl," a "bookworm and dreamer", who spent her childhood playing in the woods. Duncan cited The Princess and the Goblin, The Wizard of Oz and Mary Poppins series among her favorite novels as a child. She started writing and submitting manuscripts to magazines at age 10, and sold her first story at the age of 13. At age 15, Duncan was photographed by her father posed at Siesta Key, and the photo appeared on the cover of the July 9, 1949, issue of Collier's magazine.

She graduated from Sarasota High School in 1952. The following autumn, she enrolled at Duke University, but dropped out in 1953 to start a family with Joseph Cardozo, a fellow student she had met at the university.

== Career ==
=== Early publications ===
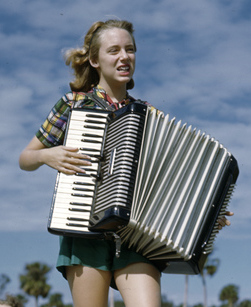
Duncan in Sarasota, Florida, 1947

After dropping out of college, Duncan continued to write and publish magazine articles; she wrote over 300 articles published in magazines such as Ladies' Home Journal, Redbook, McCall's, Good Housekeeping, and Reader's Digest. She published her first novel, Love Song for Joyce, in 1958 under the pen name Lois Kerry, followed by Debutante Hill in 1959; the latter was initially rejected for a literary prize because it featured an adolescent character drinking a beer.

In 1962, Duncan moved to Albuquerque, New Mexico, with her children after divorcing her first husband, Joseph Cardozo, and supported herself writing greeting cards and fictional confessionals for pulp magazines. In 1966, she published the novel Ransom, detailing a group of students held captive on a school bus, which earned her an Edgar Allan Poe Award nomination, as well as marking her shift from romance to more suspense-oriented works.

In the early 1970s, Duncan was hired to teach journalism at the University of New Mexico. "I was hired on a fluke," Duncan recalled in a 2011 interview: Her friend, who was the chair of the journalism department, hired her as a replacement based on her experience writing for magazines, despite the fact that she did not have a degree. While teaching, Duncan enrolled in classes at the university, earning her Bachelor of Arts in English in 1977.

In 1970, she published the historical novel Peggy, chronicling the life of Peggy Shippen, followed by the 1971 children's book Hotel for Dogs, which was later adapted as a 2009 film of the same name starring Emma Roberts.

=== Suspense and horror novels ===
Influenced by her own interest in the supernatural and speculative fiction, Duncan wrote various suspense and horror novels aimed for teenagers. Some of her works have been adapted for the screen, the most infamous example being the 1997 film I Know What You Did Last Summer, adapted from her 1973 novel of the same title, an adaptation she was not fond of due to her daughter's murder the prior decade. After the publication of I Know What You Did Last Summer, Duncan wrote Down a Dark Hall (1974), a Gothic novel following four students at an isolated and mysterious boarding school. In 1976, she published the supernatural horror novel Summer of Fear, which was also adapted into a 1978 film by director Wes Craven.

In 1978, Duncan published the controversial Killing Mr. Griffin, a novel that details three high-school students' murder of their English teacher. Critic Margery Fisher noted Duncan's "unreserved" approach to writing the novel, in language she described as both "harsh and literal." Richard Peck of The New York Times also praised the novel, writing: "Duncan breaks some new ground in a novel without sex, drugs, or black leather jackets, but the taboo she tampers with is far more potent and pervasive: the unleashed fury of the permissively reared against any assault on their egos and authority ... The value of the book lies in the twisted logic of the teenagers and how easily they can justify anything." Killing Mr. Griffin was one of Duncan's major critical successes, and was selected as an American Library Association Best Book for Young Adults that year.

In the 1980s, Duncan would publish several more horror novels with supernatural themes, including Stranger with My Face (1981), about a teenage girl's experiences with astral projection, and The Third Eye (1984), also with psychic themes. In 1985, she wrote another suspense novel, Locked in Time.

=== Later works ===
In 1988 and 1989, Duncan published the thriller novels The Twisted Window and Don't Look Behind You, respectively. From 1987 to 1989, Duncan wrote several picture books for young children, some paired with audio CDs of songs for children, including Songs from Dreamland, Dream Songs from Yesterday, Our Beautiful Day, and The Story of Christmas.

After the murder of her youngest daughter, Kaitlyn, in 1989, she only wrote one more horror novel, a supernatural thriller titled Gallows Hill (1997). The murder of Duncan's daughter marked a shift in her writing, and she spent the remainder of her career writing thematically lighter material, mainly children's chapter and picture books. In 1992, she published Who Killed My Daughter?, a nonfiction account of her daughter's unsolved murder.

In the 2000s, Duncan wrote two sequels to Hotel for Dogs—News for Dogs (2009) and Movie for Dogs (2010), both children's novels. She also published her second collection of poetry in 2007, titled Seasons of the Heart. Her final book, a nonfiction sequel to Who Killed My Daughter? titled One to the Wolves, was published in 2013 with a foreword by Ann Rule.

Beginning in 2010, ten of Duncan's most successful teen novels were updated for a new generation and re-released in paperback with modern cover designs. For the new editions, Duncan gave characters updated wardrobes, more contemporary dialogue, and access to technologies such as cell phones.

== Personal life ==
Duncan had three children with her first husband, Joseph Cardozo: daughters Robin and Kerry, and son Brett. Her first marriage ended in divorce in 1962. In 1965, she married Donald Arquette, an electrical engineer; they had two children: son Donald, Jr., and daughter Kaitlyn. Her three oldest children all took her second husband's name.

In 1989, the youngest of Duncan's children, Kaitlyn Arquette, was murdered in Albuquerque, New Mexico. She was only 18. Lois Duncan released 'Who Killed My Daughter? about her investigation into her daughter's death. Duncan had said that her "dream is to write a sequel to 'Who Killed My Daughter? to give our family's true-life horror story closure. Of course, Kait's case must be solved." Duncan also founded a research center to help investigate cold cases, which later became the nonprofit Resource Center for Victims of Violent Deaths. After her daughter's death, Duncan began writing children's picture books, saying that she could no longer write about young women in life-threatening situations.

On August 23, 2021, Albuquerque Police Chief Harold Medina announced that a suspect was picked up in July on unrelated charges. Paul Apodaca had confessed to Arquette's murder, as well as two other murders around the same time, one of which was the murder by stabbing of Althea Oakley, a University of New Mexico student. On February 21, 2022, Apodaca was indicted in the murder of Arquette. He was convicted in January 2024 and sentenced to 45 years in prison.

== Death ==
On June 15, 2016, at the age of 82, Duncan died at her home in Bradenton, Florida, of undisclosed causes. Her husband, Donald Arquette Sr., noted that Duncan had suffered a series of strokes in the years prior.

== Honors and legacy ==
Duncan is credited by many critics and journalists as a pioneering figure of young-adult fiction, particularly the teen suspense and horror genres, and has been dubbed the "queen of teen thrillers." As noted by Emily Langer of The Washington Post, Duncan often "plucked her characters from normalcy and placed them in extraordinary, often dark circumstances," in contrast to her contemporaries such as Beverly Cleary, Judy Blume, and Robert Cormier.

The ALA Margaret A. Edwards Award recognizes one writer and a particular body of work for "significant and lasting contribution to young adult literature". Duncan won the annual award in 1992 and the Young Adult Librarians now name six books published from 1966 to 1987, the autobiographical Chapters and five novels: Ransom, I Know What You Did Last Summer, Summer of Fear, Killing Mr. Griffin, and The Twisted Window. The citation observes, "Whether accepting responsibility for the death of an English teacher or admitting to their responsibility for a hit-and-run accident, Duncan's characters face a universal truth—your actions are important and you are responsible for them."

In 2014, Duncan was awarded the Grand Master award from the Mystery Writers of America alongside James Ellroy in New York City.

== Works ==
=== Anthologies edited ===
- Night Terrors (1996)
- Trapped! (1998)
- On the Edge (2000)

=== Audiobooks ===
- Dream Songs from Yesterday (1987), Silver Moon Prod.
- Songs from Dreamland (1988), Random House; ill. Kay Chorao
- Our Beautiful Day (1988), Silver Moon Prod.
- The Story of Christmas (1989), Silver Moon Prod.
- Psychics in Action (1993), Silver Moon Prod.

=== Novels ===
- Love Song for Joyce (1958), Funk & Wagnalls †
- Debutante Hill (1958), Dodd, Mead and Co.
- A Promise for Joyce (1959), Funk & Wagnalls †
- The Middle Sister (1960), Dodd, Mead and Co.
- Game of Danger (1962), Dodd, Mead and Co.
- Season of the Two-Heart (1965), Dodd, Mead and Co.
- Point of Violence (1966), Doubleday
- Ransom (1966), Doubleday ‡
- They Never Came Home (1968), Doubleday
- Major Andre, Brave Enemy (1968), G. P. Putnam's Sons; ill. Tran Mawicke
- Peggy (1970), Little, Brown and Co.
- Hotel for Dogs (1971), Houghton Mifflin; ill. Leonard Shortall ‡
- A Gift of Magic (1971), Little, Brown and Co.; ill. Arvis Stewart
- I Know What You Did Last Summer (1973), Little, Brown and Co. ‡
- When the Bough Breaks (1973), Doubleday
- Down a Dark Hall (1974), Little, Brown and Co. ‡
- Summer of Fear (1976), Little, Brown and Co. ‡
- Killing Mr. Griffin (1978), Little, Brown and Co. ‡
- Daughters of Eve (1979), Little, Brown and Co.
- Stranger with My Face (1981), Random House ‡
- The Third Eye (1984), Little, Brown and Co.
- Locked in Time (1985), Little, Brown and Co.
- The Twisted Window (1987), Delacorte
- Don't Look Behind You (1989), Delacorte
- Gallows Hill (1997), Delacorte ‡
- News for Dogs (2009), Scholastic
- Movie for Dogs (2010), Scholastic

† As Lois Kerry
‡ Works that have been adapted into films

=== Nonfiction ===
- How to Write and Sell Your Personal Experiences (1979), Writer's Digest Books
- Chapters: My Growth as a Writer (1982), Little, Brown and Co.
- Who Killed My Daughter? (1992), Delacorte
- Psychic Connections (1995), Duncan and William Roll
- One to the Wolves (2013) sequel to Who Killed My Daughter

=== Picture and chapter books ===
- The Littlest One in the Family (1959), illustrated by Suzanne K. Larsen
- Silly Mother (1962), The Dial Press, ill. Larsen
- Giving Away Suzanne (1962), Dodd, Mead & Co.; ill. Leonard Weisgard
- The Terrible Tales of Happy Days School (1983), Little, Brown and Co.; ill. Friso Henstra
- Horses of Dreamland (1985), Little, Brown and Co.; ill. Donna Diamond
- Wonder Kid Meets the Evil Lunch Snatcher (1988), Little, Brown and Co.; ill. Margaret Sanfilippo
- The Birthday Moon (1989), Viking; ill. Susan Davis
- The Circus Comes Home (1993), Doubleday; photos by Duncan's father Joseph Steinmetz
- The Magic of Spider Woman (1996), Scholastic; ill. Shonto Begay
- The Longest Hair in the World (1999), Dragonfly; ill. Jon Macintosh
- I Walk at Night (2000), Viking; ill. Steve Johnson and Lou Fancher
- Song of the Circus (2002), Philomel; ill. Meg Cundiff

=== Poetry collections ===
- From Spring to Spring (1983), Westminster John Knox Pr.
- Seasons of the Heart (2007)

== Film adaptations ==
=== Theatrical ===
| Year | Title | Notes |
|---|---|---|
| 1997 | I Know What You Did Last Summer | |
| 2009 | Hotel for Dogs | |
| 2018 | Down a Dark Hall | Limited release |

=== TV ===
| Year | Title | Notes |
|---|---|---|
| 1978 | Summer of Fear | |
| 1997 | Killing Mr. Griffin | |
| 1998 | I've Been Waiting for You | Based on Gallows Hill |
| 1999 | Don't Look Behind You | |
| 2000 | Held for Ransom | |
| 2009 | Stranger with My Face | |
| 2021 | I Know What You Did Last Summer | |
