= Don't Look Behind You =

1989 novel by Lois Duncan

- First edition
- Author: Lois Duncan
- Language: English
- Genre: Thriller
- Publisher: Delacorte Press
- Publication date: 1989
- Publication place: United States
- Pages: 215
- ISBN: 978-0-440-20729-0

Don't Look Behind You is a 1989 young adult thriller novel by Lois Duncan. It won a number of regional awards and was adapted into a television film in 1999.

== Plot ==
This story starts out in Norwood, Virginia. April Corrigan is a 17-year-old girl who is an amazing tennis player with long blonde hair and is referred to as "Princess April." She's generally a smart and nice girl, and very content with her life.

As the story begins, April is a junior in high school, a hotshot player on her school's tennis team and is dating senior Steve Chandler. Her younger brother Bram is about 9 or 10. One day, April is signed out of school early by her maternal grandmother Lorelei. Her father, who works for the FBI, has been testifying against his boss in a drug smuggling case involving an airline; someone shot at him in the courtroom that day. Her FBI agent uncle thinks it would be safer if they were out of their house for the remainder of the trial. He relocates them to a hotel and assigns them a bodyguard.

As the trial goes on, the Corrigans become bored. April is resentful at being away from Steve. When her requests to call him are denied by their bodyguard, she surreptitiously writes and sends him a letter. A few days later, hitman Mike Vamp attempts to break into their hotel room. They are saved, but their bodyguard is killed.

April's uncle arranges for the Corrigans to go into the Witness Protection Program. They are given new names as aliases and relocated to a small Florida town, in which they are advised to remain as anonymous as possible. On the plane trip to Florida, April is seated next to a girl about 13 years old, who is traveling to spend the summer with her father and his new wife. While talking with the young girl, April gives her actual first name instead of Valerie, the new name she was assigned, reasoning she will never see the girl again so it's not important.

The family lands in Florida and make their way to their new home, a run down house in an isolated part of town. Bored and lonely, April takes a walk to the local school, where she sees a boy and a girl her own age, cousins Larry and Kim, playing tennis. She's pleased when they invite her to join them, and remembers to introduce herself as Valerie. After a few sets with Larry, he is impressed and invites April/Valerie to meet him every morning to play. April agrees, although she finds Larry a bit too full of himself for her tastes. They meet for daily tennis and it becomes clear that Larry has romantic feelings for April, which she does not reciprocate. Still, she is glad for the company and agrees to join Larry, Kim, and Kim's stepsister for a movie one evening. Much to her horror, when the three arrive to pick her up, Kim's stepsister turns out to be the girl April met on the plane, who immediately questions why she is calling herself Valerie, since her name is April. April covers up by pretending she doesn't know what the other girl is talking about, and that she must be mistaking her for someone else. The younger girl is suspicious and tries to trip April up by mentioning things that April told her on the plane, such as the fact that she was from Virginia (the family now claims to be from North Carolina.)

As the summer progresses, Larry begins aggressively pursuing April despite her repeated rebuffs. At a party, she has too much to drink and Larry starts kissing and touching her inappropriately. She doesn't fully realize what he is doing at first, but abruptly pulls away as she regains her senses. Still a bit drunk, she angrily tells Larry that she has a boyfriend in Virginia. Larry realizes that Kim's stepsister also claimed that April was from Virginia, and he too becomes suspicious and wants to know why April is lying. April tries to excuse this by saying she misspoke because she was drunk, and leaves the party without Larry. They stop speaking and no longer play tennis together.

Lonelier than ever, and hurting from the discovery that Steve and her former best friend are dating, makes April even more determined to return to her old life. She sets out to do so by flying back to Norwood with the intention of living with her maternal grandmother until she starts college. Upon arriving, she discovers that her grandmother has been the target of threats and attacks from Mike Vamp, a hitman trying to locate the Corrigans. Her grandmother insists that Vamp will never believe that April doesn't know where her father is. April realizes that her grandmother is right, and that she may have put her family in grave danger with her actions. She agrees to immediately return to Florida, and her grandmother decides that she will go with her and join the family in hiding.

April and her grandmother set out for Florida by car. On the way back, they suspect they are being followed. They arrive and find the house empty. April's parents, upon discovering her ruse, have left to look for her. Before they can return, Vamp shows up. He reveals to April that he tracked them to the hotel they were staying at before due to her letter to Steve. This helps her realize how much trouble her self-centeredness has caused her and her family. Vamp also tells her that he obtained the family's current address by calling Larry, claiming to be from the FBI and looking for April's father, who is wanted for federal crimes and has taken his family into hiding. Larry willingly gave Vamp the information he was looking for.

Vamp locks April and her grandmother in a closet. April manages to escape from the house, but is caught by Vamp. She hits him over the head with a tennis racket. The blow kills him. Later on, she, her family and grandmother are reunited, and they prepare to assume new identities and go into hiding again in a new location. April's father suggests that instead the FBI can fake his death, and the rest of the family can resume their own lives. However, the family members all agree that the most important thing is to stay together. In an epilogue, it is revealed that April now has yet another new identity in a different city, along with a new boyfriend.

== Places ==
Multiple real places are a key part to the novel. The rural areas in the novel are the outskirts of eastern Virginia and to the south of Washington D.C. The cities in the novel are Richmond, Petersburg and Williamsburg in Virginia; Pittsburgh, Pennsylvania; Durham, North Carolina and Grove City and St. Augustine in Florida. Other places in the novel are the Sarasota-Bradenton International Airport and Disneyworld.

== Awards ==
The novel won the Tennessee Volunteer State Book Award in 1991 and 1993, the Iowa High School Book Master List in 1992, the Virginia Young Readers Program Award in 1992, the Indiana Young Hoosier Award in 1992, and the Texas Lone Star Reading List in 1991. The novel was nominated for the Washington Evergreen Young Adult Book Award in 1992, the Colorado Blue Spruce Young Adult Book Award in 1991 and 1992, and the Illinois Rebecca Caudill Young Readers Award in 1995.

== Reception ==
In an interview with Lois Duncan, the interviewer said that the book was challenged for its immorality, graphic references, and sexual references. Lois Duncan thinks that it may have been a mix-up because there is only one part of the novel where it gets close to a sex scene.

== Television film ==
The book was adapted into a 1999 television film of the same name. The film was directed by David Winning and stars Patrick Duffy, Pam Dawber and Dominic Raake. The film first aired on Fox Family on July 25, 1999.

== Differences between the novel and the film ==
- In the novel, April is the central character; she narrates the story from her own POV. In the film, April's dad is the main character.
- In the novel, April's dad is named George Bramwell Corrigan, Senior. In the film, his name is Jeff Corrigan.
- In the novel, April's sweetheart is named Steve. In the movie, his name is Stef.
- In the novel, April and Steve part ways and she meets a young gentleman whose name is not given, being only referred to as "The Boy." In the movie, April and Stef are reunited
- In the novel, April's mom is an author of books for children and teens. In the movie, she works for a company.
- None of the FBI Agents from the novel - Max Barber, Tom Geist, Jim Peterson - are mentioned in the film.
- In the novel, the hitman is named Mike Vamp. This name was changed for the film.

== Connection with daughter Kaitlyn ==
The book is based on Lois Duncan's daughter Kaitlyn Arquette's personality. Arquette was shot to death shortly after the book was published while riding home from her friend's house. Duncan believes that Don't Look Behind You was a premonition of her daughter's death. Like the main character of the novel, Kaitlyn was chased by a hired gunman that resembled the killer that was on the cover of a paperback version.

Duncan investigated her daughter's death herself (after being unsatisfied with the police investigation), and wrote the non-fiction book Who Killed My Daughter? about the experience.
