= I've Been Waiting for You (film) =

- DVD cover
- Genre: Horror
- Based on: Gallows Hill by Lois Duncan
- Screenplay by: Duane Poole
- Directed by: Christopher Leitch
- Starring: Sarah Chalke; Soleil Moon Frye; Ben Foster; Christian Campbell; Maggie Lawson; Chad Cox; Tom Dugan; Julie Patzwald; Markie Post
- Composer: Jeff Eden Fair
- Country of origin: United States

Production
- Executive producers: Bonnie Raskin; Joel S. Rice
- Producer: Gerald T. Olson
- Cinematography: Jon Joffin
- Editor: John Duffy
- Running time: 90 minutes
- Production company: Artisan

Original release
- Network: NBC
- Release: March 22, 1998

I've Been Waiting for You is a 1998 television film teen-horror film directed by Christopher Leitch. The film is based on the 1997 novel Gallows Hill written by Lois Duncan.

== Plot ==
Sarah Zoltanne (Sarah Chalke) is a teenager who recently moved from Los Angeles to Pinecrest, New England with her mother, Rosemary (Markie Post). Always having been an outsider, she is not very welcomed by her classmates at school. Especially the popular group (who call themselves the 'Descendants Club,' as they are the children of the town's oldest families), including Kyra Thompson (Soleil Moon Frye), Eric Garrett (Christian Campbell), Debbie Murdock (Maggie Lawson), Kevin Lane (Chad Cox), and Misty (Julie Patzwald) are rude to her, criticizing her unusual clothes and attitude. She also meets Charlie Gorman (Ben Foster), who is considered the school geek because he also doesn't quite fit in and works in a family owned occult bookstore. Sarah and Charlie get along fairly well. Sarah is soon bothered with phone calls from a mysterious person, saying "I've been waiting for you." Being a supporter of wicca, she isn't very worried.

Later on, Kyra and Eric, who are a couple, break into her house and tell her the house was inhabited by Sarah Lancaster (Laura Mennell) in 1698, a young woman who was in love with a man who was already engaged to another woman. According to Kyra, Sarah later lost her mind and was put into a mental hospital. Not much later, the man she was in love with died, along with his fiancée. The townspeople thought that Sarah was responsible, and burned her at the stake following the accusation of witchcraft. Before dying, Sarah Lancaster casts a curse that has been passed down through the town's history, which indicates she may return for revenge:

"5 descendants in a row,

Generations yet to know.

Powers cast their fiery glow,

secrets only witches know."

Kyra and Eric then persuade her to participate in a prank, pretending to be a psychic at a party, which she agrees to. At the party, Sarah is given a microphone, so Kyra can secretly provide her all the secrets of her customers, however, after Kyra leaves the microphone unattended, an unknown person gives Sarah disturbing information about Debbie (that she has been sleeping with Eric, who is Kyra's boyfriend) and Misty, revealing the abusive relationship of her parents. Misty freaks out and leaves the party in anger. While driving home, she is attacked and scared to death by a masked killer using a glove in which long, spiked protrusions have been attached. Before she dies, she hears the killer whisper "I've been waiting for you." The next day, upon hearing the news, the popular group immediately suspect Sarah for the murder, thinking that she might be the reincarnation of Sarah Lancaster, coming back for revenge on the descendants of the people responsible for burning her. Sarah insists that the information was given to her by Kyra, but Kyra states that she set the microphone down and has proof that she was elsewhere (with Eric).

Soon, other people of the Descendants Club are targeted by the masked killer, each hearing the same phrase whispered before or during the attack; "I've been waiting for you." Kevin is attacked while in the school locker room and is killed, but both Eric and Debbie are able to escape their attacks, Debbie sustaining a beauty-marring injury to her face. Charlie is also targeted, barely escaping a fire set by the masked killer in his bookstore, and when Sarah questions why he would be (since the attacker seems only to be targeting the descendants), he reveals to her that he is actually also a descendant, but that the others are unaware of this. Although they had been working together to unravel the mystery of the killer, Charlie feels that he must back off from his friendship with Sarah, unsure about whether she is or is not behind the attacks. Meanwhile, the popular group are certain that Sarah is responsible, and to save their own lives, they decide that they must burn her. Eric, pretending to be interested in taking Sarah on a date, lures her to his SUV, only to tie her up with help of Debbie and Kyra. They take her to a clearing with wooden poles and tie her to one with the intention of burning her at the stake for witchcraft.

Trying to distract them long enough to escape or talk sense into them, she begins to tell them all the information she has been gathering about the descendants and their families, informing them that there is actually a 6th descendant that they are unaware of (Charlie). She also reveals that Debbie has slept with Eric, which makes Kyra angry enough to turn on Debbie. While they are accusing each other, with Sarah insisting it isn't either of them, they are attacked by the masked killer. Sarah is able to get free and, after a struggle, they are able to overpower the killer. When they unmask him, it turns out that Charlie is the killer, having made the glove in shop, during school. Before he is arrested, he reveals that his mother was a descendant, as well, but she was driven out of town by the other families when she turned up pregnant, but was unmarried. His attacks were actually a revenge for the townspeople driving his mother away, and had nothing to do with the legend of Sarah Lancaster.

Later, when Sarah returns home, Ted Rankin (Tom Dugan), their history teacher who has been dating Sarah's mother, Rosemary, is revealed to also be involved in the murders; it is implied that Charlie may have been his illegitimate son, but this is never confirmed because, after attacking Sarah's mother and overpowering Sarah, he leaves town and cannot be located.

A month later, Sarah is settling into the town and her place at school. She is dating Eric and seems to be adjusting, normally. As she waits for Eric to meet her, Sarah visits the grave of Sarah Lancaster, and while clearing it free of leaves and debris, her voiceover states that Sarah Lancaster had indeed returned, but that some methods were better than others for dealing with revenge and that the townspeople had been relaying the curse incorrectly all these years; she repeats it while kneeling over Sarah Lancaster's grave:

"6 descendants in a row,

Generations yet to know.

Powers cast their fiery glow,

secrets only witches know."

And then states, quietly, with a mysterious smile. "Two down... 4 to go."

Eric arrives and, while hugging him, she whispers in his ear, "I've been waiting for you...."

== Cast ==
- Sarah Chalke as Sarah Zoltanne
- Soleil Moon Frye as Kyra Thompson
- Ben Foster as Charlie Gorman
- Christian Campbell as Eric Garrett
- Maggie Lawson as Debbie Murdock
- Chad Cox as Kevin Lane
- Tom Dugan as Ted Rankin
- Julie Patzwald as Misty
- Markie Post as Rosemary Zoltanne

== Reception ==
The film was released in a time where teen horror films were very successful. However, reception was largely negative, with reviewers particularly criticizing its similarity to other teen slashers, including Scream (1996), The Craft (1996), and I Know What You Did Last Summer (1997).
