= Lizzie Skurnick =

American writer, critic and editor

Lizzie Skurnick is a writer, critic and editor. In 2007, she started Jezebel's Fine Lines column, "the feature in which we give a wrinkled look at the books we loved as youth," which she wrote until 2009. Shelf Discovery, her book on young adult fiction of her youth, appeared from HarperCollins in 2009.

Her YA publishing imprint, Lizzie Skurnick Books, was founded in 2013. The press's classic YA reprints have been praised by The Boston Globe, The New York Times many other publications and organizations. The press's first original book, Isabel's War, published in 2014, received praise from The Wall Street Journal and other critical outlets and the Association of Jewish Libraries named it a Sydney Taylor Honor Book (second to the first prize winner).

Skurnick's "That Should Be a Word" column appeared weekly in The New York Times Magazine's One Page Magazine from 2011 to 2014. Her coinages have been praised and/or used by Bust Magazine, Salon, and ABC affiliates, among others. The Mets' Ron Darling suggested his own addition to the series. Skurnick's That Should Be a Word: A Language Lover’s Guide to Choregasms, Povertunity, Brattling, and 250 Other Much-Needed Terms for the Modern World, inspired by and expanding upon the column, was published by Workman in April 2015.

Skurnick first became known as the founder of a litblog.

== Personal life ==
Skurnick identifies as black and Jewish. She has written that her parents' union was illegal in most of the United States when they married. She has also written about her reasons for giving birth to her son through a sperm donor. She was born in the Bronx and grew up in New Jersey. She lives in Jersey City. On May 20, 2023, she married Matthew Lenaghan, a resident of Ossining.
