= More Sideways Arithmetic from Wayside School =

1994 book by Louis Sachar

More Sideways Arithmetic From Wayside School
- First edition
- Author: Louis Sachar
- Language: English
- Series: Sideways Stories From Wayside School
- Subject: Cryptarithms, Logic puzzles
- Genre: Fiction
- Publisher: Scholastic Press
- Publication date: 1994
- Publication place: United States
- Media type: Print (Paperback)
- Pages: 94 pp
- ISBN: 0-590-47762-5
- OCLC: 31090790
- Preceded by: Sideways Arithmetic From Wayside School
- Followed by: Wayside School Gets a Little Stranger

More Sideways Arithmetic From Wayside School is a 1994 children's novel by Louis Sachar in the Wayside School series. Like Sideways Arithmetic From Wayside School before it, the book contains no overarching plot, and is instead primarily a puzzle book. According to the book's introduction, it was created as a response to complaints the author received from students and teachers regarding the inclusion of logic puzzles in Sideways Arithmetic.

Like its predecessor, More Sideways Arithmetic is organized into 15 chapters, each of which features a number of mathematical and logical puzzles, with 58 puzzles in the book. In addition to the hints and answers provided, More Sideways Arithmetic also includes "clues" (not present in Sideways Arithmetic), which aid the reader in solving the various logical puzzles.

== Plot ==
In the first chapter, Allison invites Jason, Stephen and all the girls in class to her birthday party. She says when two or more boys are together, they start acting silly. This causes some debate, which is settled when Mrs. Jewls writes the situation as an arithmetic problem (BOYS + BOYS = SILLY). The girls are excited about their victory, until they're told the same thing goes for girls (GIRLS + GIRLS = SILLY).

Similar verbal arithmetic problems are presented regarding Sue's dog, Fangs (GOOD + DOG = FANGS), and the students' complaints about the classroom air conditioning (TOO + TOO + TOO... + TOO = HOT). Another teacher, Miss Worm (who acts as the straight man audience surrogate, similar to the character of Sue in the previous book), complains about the excitement verbal arithmetic is causing in her class.

Later chapters branch out into other types of logic puzzles, such as a variation of the unexpected hanging paradox in which the students try to predict the date of their pop quiz, and "strange facts" puzzles that require deductive reasoning to reach conclusions from sets of given facts.
