= Sideways Arithmetic from Wayside School =

1989 novel by Louis Sachar

Sideways Arithmetic From Wayside School
- First edition
- Author: Louis Sachar
- Language: English
- Series: Wayside School
- Genre: Fiction
- Publisher: Scholastic Press
- Publication date: 1989
- Publication place: United States
- Media type: Print
- Pages: 89 pp
- ISBN: 0-590-45726-8 (paperback)
- OCLC: 33599145
- Preceded by: Wayside School is Falling Down (1989)
- Followed by: More Sideways Arithmetic from Wayside School (1994)

Sideways Arithmetic From Wayside School is a children's novel by Louis Sachar in the Wayside School series. The book contains mathematical and logic puzzles for the reader to solve, presented as what The New Yorker called "absurdist math problems." The problems are interspersed with characteristically quirky stories about the students at Wayside School.

== Plot ==
Sideways Arithmetic from Wayside School begins with a foreword from Sachar in character as Louis the yard teacher, explaining the "sideways" nature of the problems within. He says that when he showed the students at Wayside School a regular math textbook, they laughed, thinking it was a book of jokes.

The first chapter introduces Sue, a new student in Mrs. Jewls's class. She is bewildered to discover that the arithmetic lessons involve adding words instead of numbers using verbal arithmetic, e.g., "elf + elf = fool." The book presents an explanation for children of how these problems are solved, and then gives them several to do on their own. In chapter 2, Sue protests that math isn't supposed to be done that way, and gives the class a few traditional math problems like "seven + four = eleven." These are also presented as verbal arithmetic puzzles that are, as Mrs. Jewls states, impossible; the reader is tasked with figuring out why. In the next chapter, Mrs. Jewls tells Sue that if she doesn't understand how to do math in her class, she should switch schools. But when Sue inadvertently gets a question correct, Mrs. Jewls lets her stay. Chapter 4 contains more verbal arithmetic problems, this time with multiplication.

Beginning with chapter 5, the book switches to logic and optimization problems. In this chapter, students have to determine what happened at recess through logical elimination. In Chapter 6, Mrs. Jewls is having trouble filling out report cards because she lost the correct answers to a series of quizzes; the reader must logically deduce those answers based on the scores each student got. Chapter 7 presents an algebraic optimization problem: lunch lady Miss Mush's meals become more and more disgusting the more of them she prepares, and the reader must determine, among other things, how many meals she should cook so that the most students are willing to eat. Chapter 8 involves "false logic" puzzles, with statements presented as questions on true-or-false quizzes. In the final chapter, Sue finally makes a new friend, Joy, who has stayed after school trying to solve her impossible true-or-false test involving the liar's paradox. They go home together.

== Critical reception ==
Charles Ashbacher, writing in the Journal of Recreational Mathematics, called Sideways Arithmetic an "excellent supplementary book for elementary school mathematics," and suggested that the verbal arithmetic problems would be particularly useful in teaching. The Guardian praised the book and its sequel, writing: "Sachar never wastes a moment, a word or a clue."
