= Wayside School Beneath the Cloud of Doom =

2020 children's novel by Louis Sachar

- First edition
- Author: Louis Sachar
- Illustrator: Tim Heitz
- Language: English
- Series: Wayside School
- Genre: Children's literature
- Publisher: HarperCollins Children's Books
- Publication date: March 3, 2020
- Publication place: United States
- Media type: Print (in Hardcover)
- Pages: 192
- ISBN: 978-0-06-296538-7
- Preceded by: Wayside School Gets A Little Stranger (1995)

Wayside School Beneath the Cloud of Doom is a 2020 children's short story cycle novel by American author Louis Sachar. It is the fourth book in the main Wayside School series, and the sixth book overall.

The book is set in the titular Wayside School, an elementary school that was accidentally built sideways, being thirty stories tall with one classroom on each floor, but without a nineteenth story. The book focuses on the school as the Cloud of Doom, a large gloomy storm cloud, settles above the school, inciting bouts of anxiety and depression in the students. In an interview with The Washington Post, Louis Sachar explains that the story was inspired by various factors in the modern world that have been causing him stress, including global warming, his mother's battle with Alzheimer's disease, and the election of Donald Trump.

== Chapters ==
1. The Bells of Wayside
This chapter introduces Wayside School's elaborate bell system, while Todd tries to rush to class in the morning. He shows up late, and the day goes poorly for him, as his name is written on the discipline list, Mrs. Jewls assigns numerous homework assignments, and a warning is written on the blackboard about the upcoming Ultimate Test. At the end of the chapter, the Erase-the-Blackboard Bell rings, forcing Mrs. Jewls to erase the blackboard, cancelling the homework assignments, delaying the Ultimate Test, and removing Todd's name from the discipline list.

2. A Million
Mrs. Jewls is teaching the class a lesson on how large a million is, and decides the best way to show it is by collecting a million of something. Terrence, who had been kicking things for the entire morning, is not paying attention due to his big toe hurting, and decides to relieve his pain by clipping his toenail. Mrs. Jewls, seeing this, decides that the class will collect a million nail clippings.

3. Up and Down
D.J. has a bad case of the hiccups, which Kathy is arguing with. Mrs. Jewls has D.J. see Dr. Pickell to cure his hiccups, and has Kathy come with him. Dr. Pickell takes note of Kathy's argumentative behavior as he takes D.J. into his office to scare the hiccups out of him. When finished, Dr. Pickell decides to take Kathy into his office as well, while D.J. waits in the hallway. When she returns, she is acting much nicer, something that catches D.J. off-guard.

4. Consider the Paper Clip
Dana, having finished her book report, needs a paper clip to hold it together, but is unable to find one. She asks Mrs. Jewls for a new one, and Mrs. Jewls is very upset, having given Dana a paper clip at the start of the year that she was supposed to hold on to. After it turns out numerous other students have lost their paper clips as well, Mrs. Jewls is ashamed, and explains to the class the laborious process by which paper clips are made. She hands Dana a new paper clip, and Dana promises not to lose it.

5. Eric, Eric, and What's-His-Name?
Of the three Erics in Mrs. Jewls's class, Eric Ovens is shown to be the one that gets the least attention from his classmates. Eric Ovens hopes to remedy this by bringing in more nail clippings than any other student, but is disheartened when he is overshadowed by Eric Bacon bringing in 349. Kathy, however, encourages Eric Ovens to still show his collection to Mrs. Jewls, and cheers him on due to bringing the second-most ever, something the rest of the class joins in on.

6. Oppositosis
A flashback to "Up and Down," where Kathy is seen in Dr. Pickell's office. Dr. Pickell has Kathy say the first word that comes to her mind based on the words he says, and diagnoses her with oppositosis, a condition that makes her say the opposite of whatever she intends to. He hypnotizes her, and has her imagine stepping through a mirror, and imagine what is on the other side. He then has her wake up, still on the other side of the mirror. Back in Mrs. Jewls's class, Mrs. Jewls notices that while Kathy has been acting nicer lately, all of her work is being written backwards.

7. The Closet That Wasn't There
When Mac returns to class from lunch, he notices a large, heavily locked cabinet outside of Mrs. Jewls's class. The other students also start to notice the closet, and start questioning what is inside. They attempt opening it, but Mrs. Jewls shows up, frantically warning all the students to stay away from her closet, telling them to treat it as if it is not there. Mac, however, is left more curious than ever.

8. Science
The students of Mrs. Jewls's class go onto the school's roof to study the various clouds in the sky. Bebe draws pictures of the clouds in her notebook, imagining them as other things. Benjamin notices a dark cloud off in the distance, and asks what it is, but Mrs. Jewls has all the students run back inside as fast as they can. The chapter ends with Mrs. Jewls explaining that it is a Cloud of Doom.

9. The Gonnnnng
Louis is working on the playground, when the Cloud of Doom casts its shadow over the school. Louis ends up over-inflating a ball, causing it to explode, and begins to collect the scattered pieces, but remembers he has to prepare the gong that Mr. Kidswatter rings at the end of the day. After Kidswatter rings the gong, he notices the kids complimenting Louis, but not himself, and asks Louis why. Louis tells Mr. Kidswatter that he should do something nice for the students, like letting one of them ring the gong instead. Mr. Kidswatter is initially hesitant, but considers it after hearing that Louis may write a nice chapter about him later in the book.

10. Stuck
Dana is shown to be skilled at making funny faces, but Mrs. Jewls warns her that her face could get stuck. Dana does not worry, since her face usually bounces back, but after making a funny face when John teases her, it actually does get stuck. The students ask Louis for help, and he just blows his whistle, which attracts the attention of other students, as well as Mr. Kidswatter. Mr. Kidswatter gets into a staring contest with Dana, and eventually walks away. Dana's face gets unstuck, but now Mr. Kidswatter's face is stuck in the same expression.

11. What's the Point?
Mrs. Jewls is having students suggest words for her weekly spelling lesson, when Myron asks her what the point of spelling is when the Cloud of Doom is hanging above them. The other students agree with his pessimistic outlook, but Mrs. Jewls asks what the point of quitting is, and gives an inspirational speech, explaining that the world will be a happier place when the Cloud of Doom is gone. She continues with her lesson, with Jenny suggesting the word "hope."

12. Mrs. Surlaw
This chapter introduces Mrs. Surlaw, the school librarian, who organizes all the books in the library by their number of pages, and not any other factor. Allison is picking out a long novel to read, and Jason picks one that is one page longer. Allison repeatedly picks longer novels than Jason, and Jason always tries to pick one that is longer, but eventually Allison dashes around a corner, and checks out a book that Jason is not aware of. Jason wants to pick one longer than Allison still, but worries constantly that she picked a book longer than whatever he considers. He ends up picking the last book in the library, which is 999 pages long.

13. Umbrella
Sharie is stomping in puddles in the rain, carrying her favorite umbrella, when she hears the school's morning bell ring. She starts rushing for the school, hoping not to be late, but briefly pauses when she looks up and notices that the Cloud of Doom has been keeping all the other clouds away, including the rain clouds. Suddenly, a gust of wind tears her umbrella away, and she reaches for it, getting carried alongside it. She starts wondering when to let go, realizing that she will be sucked into the Cloud of Doom if she does not. She ends up leaping through a window into her class, and makes it to class just on time, at the sacrifice of her favorite umbrella.

14. Mr. K and Dr. P
This chapter is about Mr. Kidswatter and Dr. Pickell, though both their names are obscured for the purpose of confidentiality. Mr. Kidswatter walks into Dr. Pickell's office to get help with his stuck face, while Dr. Pickell looks for a solution. Dr. Pickell settles on hypnotizing him, having him imagine his grandmother baking a pie, and having him imagine the smell and taste. However, before he can take a bite, the pie is smashed in his face, surprising him so much that his expression becomes undone. Mr. Kidswatter thanks Dr. Pickell for the help, and Dr. Pickell is happy to have helped someone so important, except that he now has the face himself.

15. The Unbreakables
This chapter introduces the Unbreakables, a four-way friend group consisting of Deedee, Ron, Maurecia, and Joy. The Cloud of Doom is shown to put pressure on friendships, including the Unbreakables, where the other three start to tease Deedee over her enjoyment of Miss Mush's spaghetti and feetballs, which leads to her messing up her homework and having to start over. Deedee finishes her homework while the other three enjoy recess, and dumps her tray in the trash after she finishes. Deedee, however, realizes that her homework was on the tray, and has to search through the dumpsters to find it. The other three end up joining her, and the chapter notes that while even the Cloud of Doom could not break their friendship, the ultimate test of friendship is still to come.

16. A Short Chapter About a Long Book
Jason is regretting picking the longest book in the library, as Mrs. Jewls repeatedly asks him if his book report is ready. Jason is shown to be stalling reading the book, but as he reads further, slowly gets invested in it. Eventually he starts reading so much, that he cannot stop. Allison and Rondi try to tease him, but he asks them to quiet down, as he is trying to read.

17. The Best Principal Ever!!!
Mrs. Jewls is handing out homework assignments, when Mr. Kidswatter barges into the class, asking for someone to ring the gong on Friday. All the students want to be chosen, but he ends up selecting Stephen, a choice that confuses everyone, including himself. However, he moves forwards with it, telling Stephen to show up at the bottom of the stairs on Friday. The other students tell Stephen how lucky he is, but he can not hear them, only hearing the gong.

18. The Mirror
Dr. Pickell is looking at his face in the mirror, trying to figure out how to get it unstuck. He tries putting himself to sleep, but it does not work, as he cannot tell himself what to do. He wakes up much later, noticing his face in the mirror is still stuck, but he begins to notice his own face is not, and that he transferred the face to his reflection. He realizes his discovery, and briefly considers sharing it to become famous, but worries about the face getting transferred to someone else, and shatters the mirror instead. This affects Kathy, who notices her handwriting is backwards. D.J. says that it is cool, but Kathy says it is warm.

19. Push-Downs
Stephen is on the playground doing push-downs, preparing to ring the gong. Kathy remarks that they should be called push-ups, not because she is trying to be opposite, as she discovered she likes having friends, but because she is pretty sure that is what they are called. Stephen asks if someone else can do it, but Louis assures Mr. Kidswatter must have picked him for a good reason. There is a flashback to "The Best Principal Ever!!!" where it is revealed Kidswatter meant to pick Joy, but ended up noticing Dana instead. He prepared to point accusingly at her, but she bent down to scratch a mosquito bite, and Stephen sits behind her. Back on the playground, Louis explains that if Stephen does not do it, then he will be disappointed whenever he hears a gong again. Stephen gives it one last shot, raising himself an inch above the ground.

20. Inside the Closet
Jason finishes his book, and turns in a ten page long book report to Mrs. Jewls. Mrs. Jewls asks where the paper clip is, and he reveals that he bent it in the process, into a thin, crooked line. Mrs. Jewls takes him to the closet, and starts the elaborate process of unlocking it. When she opens it, the closet appears to be empty, and Jason worries he will be locked inside, but Mrs. Jewls has him look closer. There is a small box of paper clips in the closet, and Mrs. Jewls hands one to Jason, having him promise to never tell anyone else where he got it.

21. Breathe
Stephen is still worried about ringing the gong, but his classmates try to calm him down, asking him to breathe. He continuously thinks of the various things that could go wrong, but his classmates continue to calm him down. Mrs. Jewls prepares for music class, but the instruments are being cleaned, so they must simply make music by whatever means they can. Time passes quickly, and suddenly Stephen realizes he may be late to ring the gong. The class has him breathe one more time as he leaves the room.

22. The Moment
Stephen heads down the stairs, still worrying about what could go wrong, when he notices Jenny's skateboard between two stairs. He steps over it, and realizing how easy it was, all his fears fade away. He runs down to the first floor, where it turns out he is right on time, and is handed the heavy iron mallet to ring the gong. He swings, and misses, but brings himself around in a circle, hitting it on the second go. On the thirtieth story, the children cheer, and the chapter ends by noting that whenever Stephen is upset, he thinks about that moment, and smiles.

23. Blame It on the Cloud
Mrs. Jewls notices that many students in her class have been misbehaving, but they all claim that the Cloud of Doom is making them do it. While initially forgiving, she becomes increasingly frustrated as more students continue to use the cloud as a scapegoat, and eventually has enough. She makes all the students write their name under the discipline list, except for Todd, who she says has been behaving, and she decides that the Ultimate Test will start tomorrow. The other students ask why Mrs. Jewls is being so mean, and she blames it on the Cloud of Doom.

24. The Ultimate Test, Day One
As the first major event in the Ultimate Test, Mrs. Jewls holds a spelling bee in her room. The competition narrows down to Ron and Maurecia, who end up narrowing down all the words in the dictionary, forcing Mrs. Jewls to resort to non-dictionary words. Ron eventually messes up the spelling of "whummph," causing Maurecia to win, though he thinks it is unfair, as he cannot know how a made-up word is spelled. While Maurecia celebrates, Ron is not smiling.

25. Jump Rope Arithmetic
The major event of the second day of the Ultimate Test is Jump Rope Arithmetic, which involves solving math problems while jumping rope. Joy turns out to be an expert at this, quickly accumulating points to set a new school record, something that makes her feel very proud. She starts daydreaming of the success she will have from her record, but notices Maurecia is still jumping. Joy waits for Maurecia to slip up, but Maurecia keeps going, eventually getting a score over twice as large as Joy's. However, Joy does not see her fall, having stopped watching long beforehand.

26. The Ultimate, Ultimate Test
The final major event of the Ultimate Test is the Stairway Quiz, where students must run up the stairs of Wayside while solving trivia problems. If they miss a problem, they will be sent back to the previous checkpoint, which shows up every five floors. Deedee excels at this, answering most problems right, and quickly rushing up the stairs, but she gets stuck briefly trying to recite the alphabet backwards on the school's missing nineteenth story, giving Maurecia time to catch up with her. The two rush up the stairs together, while Deedee starts to get ahead, but she ends up missing the final problem, letting Maurecia get the victory. At the end of the day, Joy, Ron, and Deedee meet by the flagpole, with Maurecia showing up much later due to being interviewed for her excellent performance on the Ultimate Test. The Unbreakables eventually reconcile, and the chapter notes that while helping a friend that is down is a true test of friendship, staying by a friend that is up is the ultimate test of friendship.

27. Kachooga Boop
It is revealed that no one failed the Ultimate Test, as Mrs. Jewls designed it so each student's talent would shine. Myron begins to bring in his nail clippings for the day, bringing the total to 999,999, but is interrupted by a loud bell he has never heard before. Mrs. Jewls searches to find out what that bell means, and it turns out to be a request for immediate evacuation, as the Cloud of Doom is about to destroy everything. The students hurry out of the room, and down the stairs holding hands so they will not get lost in the darkness, but Joe slips on a skateboard, bringing everyone else down with him. The students worry about what they should do, but they notice one classroom is still open.

28. The Teacher with the Long Fingernail
The students rush into the one active classroom, which turns out to be Miss Zarves's class on the school's missing nineteenth story, allowing Calvin to finally turn in the note he was supposed to deliver in Sideways Stories from Wayside School. The class is doing their history lesson, where they are supposed to study every person who has ever lived, something that stumps all the students in Mrs. Jewls's class. Myron is handed a Chinese dictionary so he can study the people that were born in China, when he gets the idea to trim Miss Zarves's fingernail, which has grown excessively large. After clipping it, the students find themselves scattered on the staircase, with Myron holding up the millionth nail clipping.

29. After the Storm
The students return to class after the storm, which has shuffled everything inside the school to a random other floor. In Mrs. Jewls's class, Myron places the millionth nail clipping in the bucket, though the rest are gone. As the teachers stay inside to clean the mess, the students are sent outside, where it is shown that the Cloud of Doom dropped a lot of snow over the school. The kids play a game, while they try to crash into the clumps of snow Louis is tossing off the roof, but he eventually notices Sharie's umbrella caught in the snow. He yanks it out, but ends up sliding backwards off the roof, holding the wrong end of the umbrella to use it as a parachute. He tries to grab the flagpole and misses, but the hooked end of the umbrella latches on, spinning him around in circles as he slides down. Sharie grabs back her umbrella, thanking Louis, but informing he should have used the stairs.

30. Rainbow
Miss Mush is preparing to make the best meal ever after the Cloud of Doom is gone, and eventually settles on making rainbow stew. She gets help from her assistant, Mr. Pepperadder, to collect various colorful ingredients to use, but by the time she is serving it, she notices that it is now a grayish-brown mush. She apologizes to the students as she serves it, and the students are initially hesitant, but as they eat it, they taste the colors, and declare it the best lunch ever. Mr. Pepperadder asks what the recipe is, but Miss Mush explains there is no recipe, as no two rainbows are the same.

== Reception ==
Wayside School Beneath the Cloud of Doom has been met with largely positive reception from critics. Carrie Kingsley of Common Sense Media gave the book 5 out of 5 stars, claiming that "Beneath the teachers' comically odd takes on math, spelling bees, and P.E., there's a feeling of warmth among the students as they learn to be more forgiving and to stick together. The oddball interactions between the faculty and students always comes from a place of kindness: The terrifying Ultimate Test gives every student a chance to shine, and even the dreaded lunch lady gets it right sometimes." Kirkus Reviews additionally published a positive review of the book, stating that even after a 25-year gap from the previous book in the series, the new entry retains an entertaining sense of humor. A review from Publishers Weekly assesses the book positively as well, stating that "Sachar’s snappy comedic stride doesn’t miss a beat in his series’ fourth installment—the first since 1995's Wayside School Gets a Little Stranger—as the curiosities of Mrs. Jewls's 30th-floor classroom multiply more quickly than ever."
