= Wayside: The Movie =

- Developed by: John Derevlany
- Written by: John Derevlany; Lin Oliver
- Directed by: Riccardo Durante
- Voices of: Michael Cera as Todd; Martin Villafana as Myron; Lisa Ng as Dana; Denise Oliver as Maurecia; Kathy Najimy as Mrs. Jewls; Kedar Brown as Principal Kidswatter; Sergio Di Zio as Louis; Jayne Eastwood as Miss Mush
- Composer: Scott Bucsis
- Country of origin: Canada
- Original language: English

Production
- Executive producers: Scott Dyer; Doug Murphy; Lin Oliver
- Producer: Lin Oliver
- Running time: 48 minutes
- Production company: Nelvana

Original release
- Network: Teletoon
- Release: November 19, 2005

Wayside: The Movie is a 2005 Canadian animated television film developed by John Derevlany and produced by Nelvana, based on the Wayside School books by Louis Sachar. The film follows Todd, a transfer student, who attends Wayside, a 30-story-tall grammar school that has a reputation for the ridiculous. After a mix up with the contractor, the school was built sideways with the rooms stacked on top of each other instead of side-to-side, resulting in an Escher-esque design revolved around a fantasy environment and kid knowledge.

Wayside was conceived to be a series in 2004 by Derevlany and the movie was a pitch for Teletoon. The series was approved for 26 episodes spread across two seasons in 2007 to 2008.

== Plot ==
The movie starts with Todd transferring to Wayside school and enters Mrs. Jewls's class. After failing to adjust to Mrs. Jewls's style of teaching, he gets his name written on the discipline list and receives a check mark next to it. Todd is then warned that another disruption would cause his name to get circled and as punishment he would get sent home early on the kindergarten bus. While Todd tries to maintain good behavior, he interrupts the class once it appears that the walls of the class are closing in during Mr. Kidswatter's, the principal, announcement on the PA. Mrs. Jewls then sends Todd home early. He meets Wetnose.

The next day, when Todd arrives at school, he meets Miss Mush, Wayside's lunch lady. After avoiding her corrosive Mushroom Surprise, Todd rushes to class but misses the classroom election. Due to a tie, there was going to be a re-vote the next day. Once Mr. Kidswatter comes on the PA, the walls again begin to close in on the classroom. Todd cries out in warning, but Mrs. Jewls sees this as a disruption and sends Todd home early again. He meets Wetnose again.

The next day everyone attempts to run for classroom president, including Mr. Kidswatter and Miss Mush. The out of control election results in a game of dodge ball to decide who would be president. The game ends with Dana becoming president. Todd is then sent home again after the walls of the room begin to close in on the classroom. He instead sneaks back into school once he finds out that Mrs. Jewls's class is actually a trash compactor. With help from Louis, Todd attempts to rescue the class during a long winded announcement over the PA. Todd uses Miss Mush's corrosive Mushroom Surprise to melt through Mrs. Jewls's locked door and rescues the class. Todd is then given a new desk as he is welcomed to the class which he throws out the window.

== Characters ==
Todd (voiced by Michael Cera), a transfer student to Mrs. Jewls' class on the 30th floor of Wayside School. The movie follows his misadventure to adapt and to Wayside's offbeat academic structure and his attempt to rescue his new class. He is supported by Maurecia (Denise Oliver), a tomboy who always wears roller-skates and has a crush on Todd, Myron (Martin Villafana), a vain and self-centered student who tries to be reappointed as class president, and Dana (Lisa Ng), a Type A enthusiastic character that acts as Myron's campaign manager. The school faculty include Mrs. Jewls (Kathy Najimy), the quirky, energetic teacher of the 30th floor; Principal Kidswatter (Kedar Brown), the selfish principal of Wayside; Louis (Sergio Di Zio), the caretaker of the school; Miss Mush (Jayne Eastwood), the school's cafeteria lady who doesn't know how to cook. Besides Todd, Louis appears to be the most "normal" character in the movie.

== Differences from the books ==
There are several differences between Wayside and Sideways Stories from Wayside School. The first being that the character of Todd in the book is not a transfer student and he is also not the focus of the story. Maurecia was also originally a girl who loves ice cream who never was said to roller skate. The character of Mrs. Gorf is also omitted. Mrs. Gorf was Mrs. Jewls's predecessor who was transformed into an apple and eaten by Louis, however she does appear in a later episode of the show titled "Mrs. Gorf" but as a substitute. In the book, Mrs. Jewls has 27 students as opposed to the 16 that appear in the movie.

== Critical reviews ==
DVD Verdict stated "The most satisfying part of Wayside is how the show feels perfectly balanced—it has enough wacky antics and bizarre events to satisfy young audiences, enough logical fallacies and defiant attitudes to amuse middle-aged kids, and enough clever and sardonic wit to please adults fortunate enough to find themselves in front of a television set while the show is playing," concluding that Wayside was "the perfect cartoon adventure for families of all ages."
