= John Derevlany =

Canadian writer, director, and performer

John A. Derevlany (born October 3, 1964) is an American-Canadian writer, director, and performer known for co-creating the TV series Legends of Chima for LEGO. He also wrote every episode of the series and the Legends of Chima 4D movie playing at Legoland theme parks and Legoland Discovery Centers. Derevlany is also known for playing "Crackers the Corporate Crime Fighting Chicken" in Michael Moore's TV Nation. In addition, he created the preschool dance and movement show Animal Jam for The Jim Henson Company and the Discovery Channel, wrote many episodes of cartoon The Angry Beavers, and co-founded the heavy-metal ukulele band Uke Til U Puke.

Derevlany developed and executive produced the cartoon Squish, which premiered on HBO Max in January 2021. He wrote and developed 26 episodes of Gerald McBoing Boing based on the 1951 cartoon by Dr. Seuss. He wrote and story-edited the series Wayside, and has also written for the 2009 Doki special. Derevlany is the creator of the life sized board game CulverLand, which is a temporary artwork located in Culver City, California.

Endangered Species, developed and story edited by Derevlany, was nominated in 2016 for three awards at the 4th Canadian Screen Awards, including Best Animated Program or Series, Best Directing in an Animated Program or Series, and Best Writing in an Animated Program or Series.

Derevlany started his career as a journalist, working for newspapers and magazines, including The Village Voice, National Lampoon, and Seventeen. While working at the Hoboken Reporter Newspaper in Hoboken, New Jersey, he published his first book at the age of 23. Yuppies Invade My House at Dinnertime was hailed by The New York Times Book Review as "a vivid picture of a community in transition... It is that rare thing: a light book about a big issue."

== Screenwriting credits ==
=== Television ===
- series head writer denoted in bold
- The Angry Beavers (1997–1999)
- Brats of the Lost Nebula (1998)
- The Wild Thornberrys (1999)
- **Animal Jam** (2003)
- Johnny Test (2005–2006, 2011)
- **Gerald McBoing-Boing** (2005–2007)
- **Wayside** (2007–2008)
- **Monster Buster Club** (2007–2009)
- League of Super Evil (2009)
- Kung Fu Dino Posse (2009–2010)
- Kick Buttowski: Suburban Daredevil (2010)
- Almost Naked Animals (2011)
- Wild Grinders (2012)
- Doki (2013)
- **Legends of Chima** (2013–2014)
- The Skinner Boys: Guardians of the Lost Secrets (2014)
- **Endangered Species** (2015)
- Winston Steinburger and Sir Dudley Ding Dong (2016)
- Supernoobs (2016)
- Nexo Knights (2016–2017)
- **D.N. Ace** (2019–2020)
- **Squish** (2019–2020)
- Muscleteers (2020)
- **AKEDO: Ultimate Arcade Warriors** (2021)

=== Film ===
- Zolar (2004)
- Wayside: The Movie (2005)
