= Wayside School =

Children's book series by Louis Sachar

- Sideways Stories from Wayside School; Wayside School Is Falling Down; Wayside School Gets a Little Stranger; Wayside School Beneath the Cloud of Doom; Sideways Arithmetic from Wayside School; More Sideways Arithmetic from Wayside School
- Author: Louis Sachar
- Illustrator: Dennis Hockerman (first edition of Sideways Stories); Julie Brinckloe (second edition of Sideways Stories); Joel Schick (first editions of Falling Down and Gets a Little Stranger); Adam McCauley (third edition of Sideways Stories, second editions of Falling Down and Gets a Little Stranger); Tim Heitz (fourth edition of Sideways Stories, third editions of Falling Down and Gets a Little Stranger, first edition of Beneath the Cloud of Doom)
- Country: United States
- Language: English
- Genre: Children's literature
- Publisher: HarperCollins (US); Bloomsbury Publishing (UK)
- Published: January 1, 1978 – March 3, 2020

Wayside School is a series of short story cycle children's books written by Louis Sachar. Titles in the series include Sideways Stories from Wayside School (1978), Wayside School Is Falling Down (1989), Wayside School Gets a Little Stranger (1995), and Wayside School Beneath the Cloud of Doom (2020). The books tell of a school where the contractor misread the blueprints and mistakenly built it sideways. As such the school was constructed as a 30-story skyscraper. The 19th floor was omitted from the plans.

Sachar released two spinoff books of mathematics and puzzles interspersed with stories: Sideways Arithmetic from Wayside School (1989) and More Sideways Arithmetic from Wayside School (1994). Wayside: The Movie is a television special loosely based on the books that aired in 2005, and was followed-up by the Wayside animated series that originally ran from 2007 to 2008.

== Background ==
While a student at University of California, Berkeley, author Louis Sachar began working at an elementary school to earn college credit. Sachar later recalled,

I thought it over and decided it was a pretty good deal. College credits, no homework, no term papers, no tests, all I had to do was help out in a second/third-grade class at Hillside Elementary School in Berkeley, California. Besides helping out in a classroom, I also became the Noontime Supervisor, or "Louis the Yard Teacher" as I was known to the kids. It became my favorite college class, and a life-changing experience.

Sachar graduated from UC Berkeley in 1976 with a degree in Economics, and began working on Sideways Stories from Wayside School, a children's book set at an elementary school with supernatural elements. Although the book's students were named after children from Hillside and there is a presumably autobiographical character named "Louis the Yard Teacher," Sachar has said that he draws very little from personal experience, explaining that "....my personal experiences are kind of boring. I have to make up what I put in my books."

== Characters ==
The Wayside School books take place on the thirtieth story of Wayside School, which is taught by Mrs. Jewls, a nice teacher with occasionally impractical teaching methods. She is the replacement for the old teacher, Mrs. Gorf, who was an evil teacher who could wiggle her ears and stick out her tongue to turn the students into apples. Her ghost reappeared in a later chapter, albeit now repentant to show students the importance of differences. The third book introduces her son, Mr. Gorf, who could steal voices through a third nostril, alongside Mrs. Drazil, Louis's old teacher who remembers students that forgot homework assignments from decades ago, and Ms. Wendy Nogard, who could read thoughts with a third ear on the top of her head.

The thirtieth story has had thirty students taught throughout the course of the books (in order of first mention):

- Joe, a boy with curly hair who cannot count right (but always comes up with the correct answer anyhow)
- John, who could only read upside-down until his brain got flipped (at which point everything became upside-down for him)
- Todd, who is often sent home early on the kindergarten bus due to minor infractions, despite his good intentions
- Stephen, a boy who frequently shows up to class in silly outfits
- Kathy, who dislikes everybody she knows (and does not know)
- Paul, an inattentive boy who loves pulling pigtails
- Mac, a boy who once was named Nancy and very shy from being ashamed of his name, but after trading names with a girl whose name was once Mac, he is now very excitable and tells long stories in class
- Terrence, a school bully who rarely shares and usually kicks the balls over the fence
- Maurecia, a sweet and sensitive girl who loves ice cream, can beat up any kid in the school, and has a crush on Todd
- The three Erics: Eric Fry, the most athletic kid in the class who is often called "Butterfingers" since the other Erics are not athletic; Eric Bacon, the skinniest kid in the class who is often called "Fatso" since the other Erics are fat; and Eric Ovens, the nicest kid in the class who is usually called "Crabapple" since the other Erics are typically mean
- Jenny, a girl who is often late to school and has to get there on a motorcycle
- Calvin, a slow-paced student who is Bebe's art assistant
- Allison, a girl who typically tries to assert dominance, even over her friends, and is the most rationally-minded student in the class
- Jason, a boy with a big mouth who always gets in bad situations
- Joy, a tomboyish kleptomaniac who usually targets Todd or Dameon
- Sharie, a very small girl who wears a large coat and frequently falls asleep in class, but is respected since Mrs. Jewls believes she learns best that way
- Leslie, a girl with long pigtails that are often pulled by Paul
- Dameon, a boy with a crush on Mrs. Jewls who often is sent running up and down the thirty flights of stairs at Wayside
- Bebe Gunn, a girl who can produce art very quickly, but is shown to be a bit troublesome in class
- Myron, an attentive student who was class president for one day
- Dana, a girl with glasses who has a tendency to be overemotional
- Deedee, an athletic, competitive student with a knack for solving problems
- Ron, a boy with weak feet who loves to play kickball
- D.J., a boy who usually smiles, even without reason
- Rondi, a girl who is often recognized for the front teeth she does not have until she gets them in the second book, and is always seeking the approval of her classmates
- Benjamin Nushmutt, introduced in the second book, a boy who everyone believed was named Mark Miller up until the twenty-ninth chapter of the book

In addition to the permanent twenty-eight students, there have been two one-off students:

- Sammy, an incredibly rude new student, who was revealed to be a dead rat bundled in raincoats by the end of his introductory chapter, and never seen again
- Sue, who only appeared in the spin-off books, a normal girl who transferred to Wayside, only to be confused by the school's bizarre teaching methods

Other members of the school staff include Louis, a character based on Louis Sachar himself, being the school's yard teacher with a mustache of many colors who is friends with all the kids; Miss Mush, the school's cafeteria lady known for her poor cooking; and her assistant, Mr. Pepperadder, who is often pranked by Miss Mush because he is shorter than her. Mr. Kidswatter is the school principal, who hates all the kids and often overreacts when things do not go his way. Dr. Pickell was originally a psychiatrist in the third book, but was fired due to him including unusual side effects in his sessions. He is now the school counselor, and uses hypnosis on the students to cure their ailments but also adds strange side effects. Mrs. Surlaw is the librarian on the seventh floor, who owns a large stuffed walrus that students can hug after they have checked out a book, and orders books on shelves by number of pages. Miss Zarves is the teacher of the nineteenth story, which does not exist; her class includes five students named Ray, Virginia, Nick, Hayden, and Mark. She and her students supposedly do not exist either. There is also Miss Worm, the teacher of the honors class story who is annoyed by Mrs. Jewls's teaching methods. A few one-off characters include Mrs. Waloosh, the eccentric dance teacher at the school; Mrs. Franklin, a substitute from the second book that believed all the students were named Benjamin; Mrs. Day, the school secretary; and David, Mr. Kidswatter's chauffeur.

A few more characters include Hobo Bob, a hobo who hates socks brought in by Sharie for show-and-tell; Xavier Dalton, a man who made Ms. Nogard bitter and hateful after being disgusted by her third ear; Mr. Finch, a man who saved up his life savings to start an ice cream company; and the numerous cows, one of which ended up on the nineteenth story, that came to the school leading to it being shut down for 243 days.

== Story conventions ==
- In Sideways Arithmetic from Wayside School, it is revealed the characters add, subtract, and multiply words. The children at Wayside School have no concept of adding numbers until Mrs. Jewls teaches the kids 4+7=11, in numbers, not words.
- If a student does something wrong once, Mrs. Jewls will write that student's name under the word DISCIPLINE. If a student does something wrong a second time, Mrs. Jewls will put a check next to that student's name. If a student does something wrong a third time, Mrs. Jewls will circle their name and send them home at noon on the kindergarten bus. Despite only needing three strikes, Mrs. Jewls resorts to also adding a triangle when Sammy was disruptive. Despite being a good student, Todd is sent home every day on the kindergarten bus as a result of him always unfairly getting in trouble each day. Paul is also sent home on the kindergarten bus, but only once, after pulling Leslie's pigtails during class. Another time, when it looks like Joy was going to be sent home early, Todd thinks he is going to have company, but Joy ends up making up for her crime by kissing Jason on the nose so that he would come unstuck from the gum she put on his seat. Mrs. Jewls even sends herself home early for temporarily turning evil.
- Goozack was another word for doors in the book Wayside School Gets a Little Stranger. After Principal Kidswatter ran into his office door which was closed and spilled coffee over his clothes, he banned the word "door" and regarded it as a bad word. So he introduced the word "goozack" to replace the word door, requiring everyone to call doors "goozacks". Anyone who said "door" would get in trouble. Todd was the first student to break the new rule, only because he was late for school at the time and didn't hear the announcement. Later, when Mrs. Drazil said "door" and the students pointed out that she was to call it "goozack," she immediately said "Mr. Kidswatter is a 'goozack'" in retaliation.
- The last sentence of each book always rhymes. In the first book, it says "everybody booed," after Louis tells them a bad story about a regular school. The second book ends in "everybody mooed," after Louis asks the cows in the building to leave. The third book ends in "everybody oooohed," after Louis kisses Miss Nogard. The fourth book ends in "everybody chewed," as the students chew Miss Mush's rainbow stew to taste the colors.
- Throughout the books, there are numerous jokes relating to the 19th floor. Supposedly, the builder of Wayside forgot to build a 19th floor, and therefore many students joke about how it is nonexistent. This is first introduced in Chapter 19 of the original book, where the chapter is simply called 'Miss Zarves" after the nineteenth story teacher. It then proceeds to tell the reader that Miss Zarves teaches on the 19th floor, but as there is no nineteenth floor, there is no Miss Zarves, and as there is no Miss Zarves, there is no 19th chapter. However, it is shown to exist, "somewhere between the 18th and 20th floors". All of the students, including Mrs. Jewls, end up there, as well as a cow and presumably a basketball as well, when it disappeared after being thrown where the 19th floor would've presumably been. Also, characters who have been in the 19th floor are apparently invisible to others. The students of the nineteenth floor (Mark Miller, Virginia, Nick, and Ray Gunn) are mainly characters who are made-up. For example, 'Ray Gunn' is Bebe's made-up brother. Mark Miller is also the name given to Benjamin Nushmutt by Mrs. Jewls.

== Other media ==
The first attempt to adapt the Wayside series was in 1987, when the American Broadcasting Company made it into a 23-minute live-action special. In 2005, Nelvana produced an hour-long television special loosely based on the books called Wayside: The Movie. The special was later spun off into a series titled Wayside, which aired on Nickelodeon (U.S.) and Teletoon (Canada) from 2007 to 2008.
