= Sergio Di Zio =

Canadian actor

- Occupation: Actor
- Years active: 1995–present
- Height: 5 ft 11 in (180 cm)

Sergio Di Zio is a Canadian actor. He starred in the television series Flashpoint as Michelangelo "Spike" Scarlatti until the show concluded on December 13, 2012. His other works include The Lookout, Cinderella Man, Senior Trip; the television series This is Wonderland, Northern Town; as a voice actor for the animated series Stoked and Babar and the Adventures of Badou. He also appeared in the stage debut of Léo written by Rosa Labordé for which he received a Dora Award nomination in 2006. Di Zio was recently part of an animated show called Grojband, until the show concluded in May 2015. He more recently has transitioned to short films, however he continues to take on various projects.

== Career ==
Di Zio is best known for playing Michelangelo Scarlatti, nicknamed "Spike", on the CTV police drama Flashpoint. However, prior to landing his breakthrough role, he had appeared in over 30 movies and TV series. After making his debut in the 1995 film Senior Trip, Di Zio appeared in a string of telepics including The Wall, Major Crime, Freak City, Rembrandt: Fathers & Sons, and RFK. Additionally, he guest starred on other Canadian series, such as Murdoch Mysteries, Republic of Doyle, and even played "Ripper" on Stoked for 11 episodes.

Film appearances include Ron Howard's Cinderella Man, Boondock Saints, Flash of Genius, and the Independent Spirit Awards winning The Lookout, playing Deputy Ted. Di Zio has starred in Just Buried, 19 Months and the Peter Wellington film, Luck, winner of the South by Southwest Film Festival.

Sergio's TV movie appearances include Robert Ludlum's Covert One: The Hades Factor, John Stamos' The Wedding Wars and the Fox biopic RFK, where he played Robert F. Kennedy’s adviser and speechwriter Adam Walinsky.

In July 2012, he made a brief appearance in the show The Listener as Spike, the same Spike as in Flashpoint. The episode is Now You See Him.

In 2015, Di Zio starred in the film The Walk as officer Genco.

== Filmography ==
Film
Year	Title	Role	Notes
1995	National Lampoon's Senior Trip	Steve Nisser	
1999	The Wishing Tree	Attorney	
1999	The Boondock Saints	Oly	
2002	19 Months	Steve	
2003	The In-Laws	Lecture Room Subject	
2003	Luck	Vittorio	
2004	Plasticity	Mike Castella	Short film
2005	Cinderella Man	Young Reporter	
2005	Wayside	Louis	Television Film
2007	The Message	David	Short film
2007	The Lookout	Deputy Ted	
2007	Just Buried	Jackie Whynacht	
2008	Flash of Genius	Louis	
2012	Cold Blooded	George Keyes	
2012	Anything But Christmas	John	
2014	Angels and Ornaments	Harold Wagner / Henry Stockton	
2015	The Walk	Officer Genco	
2017	Kiss and Cry	Mark Allison	

Television
Year	Title	Role	Notes
1997	Major Crime	Young Italian Officer	TV movie
1998	The Wall	Olivern	TV movie
1999	Freak City	Leo Berman	TV movie
1999	The Passion of Ayn Rand	Student #5	TV movie
1999	Rembrandt: Fathers & Sons	Gerard	TV movie
2000	A Taste of Shakespeare	Demetrius	Episode: "A Midsummer Night's Dream"
2000	Twitch City	Jim	Episode: "The Planet of the Cats"
2001	Rough Air: Danger on Flight 534	Steve Johnson	TV movie
2002	Widows	Miles Samson	Episode: "Hour One"
2002	RFK	Adam Walinsky	TV movie
2003	Eloise at the Plaza	Lou, The Bellhop	TV movie
2003	Wild Card	Jerry	Episode: "No Bull"
2003	Eloise at Christmastime	Lou, The Bellhop	TV movie
2003	Doc	Jason	Episode: "Swing Shift"
2004	Love Rules	Kevin	TV movie
2005–2006	This Is Wonderland	Marcus Weekes	21 episodes
2006	G-Spot	Peter Garner	Episode: "Blind Faith"
2006	Covert One: The Hades Factor	Marty Zeller	TV series
2006	Northern Town	Hendy	TV series
2006	Wedding Wars	Ed Myerson	TV movie
2007–2008	Wayside	Louis	Recurring role
2007	Custody	Eugene	TV movie
2008–2012	Flashpoint	Michelangelo 'Spike' Scarlatti	Main role
2009	Stoked	Ripper / Whiteout	11 episodes
2010	Murdoch Mysteries	Leonard Winters	Episode: "Victor, Victorian"
2010	Republic of Doyle	Mystery Nevil	Episode: "The Pen Is Mightier Than the Doyle"
2010–2011	Babar and the Adventures of Badou	Tersh (voice)	15 episodes
2011	Little Mosque on the Prairie	Dr. Connor	Episode: "If You Leave Me Now"
2011	XIII: The Series		Episode: "Green Falls"
2011	Dan for Mayor	Mayor Eckler	Episode: "Mayor's Conference"
2011	Almost Heroes	Pavel	Episode: "Terry and Peter vs. Cupid"
2012	The Listener	'Spike'	Episode: "Now You See Him"
2013	Covert Affairs	Gary Probert	Episode: "Levitate Me"
2013–2015	Grojband	Kin Kujira	Main role
2014	Suits	Todd	Episode: "Breakfast, Lunch and Dinner"
2014	My Daughter Must Live	Dan	TV movie
2014	Angels and Ornaments	Harold	TV movie (Hallmark channel)
2015	Mayday	NTSB Investigator Guzzetti	Episode: "The Death of JFK Jr."
2016	Looped	Jerry Rivers	Recurring
2017–2018	Wishfart	Puffin	Main role
2018	The Detail	Martin Reid	Episode: "The Devil and the Deep Blue Sea"
2019	Private Eyes (TV series)	Evan Mallone	Episode: "Brew the Right Thing" (S2 E17)
2020	Grand Army	Coach Columbo	Recurring
2020	The Queen's Gambit	Beth's Father	Recurring
2020–2021	Elinor Wonders Why	Alejandro Possum	Recurring
2021	Hudson & Rex	Russell Matthews	Episode: "Mansion on a Hill"
2022	Chucky	Detective Sam Gavin	Episode: "The Sinners Are Much More Fun"
