= Wayside School Gets a Little Stranger =

1995 children's novel by Louis Sachar

- First edition cover.
- Author: Louis Sachar
- Genre: Children's literature
- Publisher: HarperCollins
- Publication date: April 27, 1995
- Media type: Print (in hardcover and paperback)
- Pages: 166 pp (1st edition hardcover)
- ISBN: 0-380-72381-6 (USA paperback)
- OCLC: 34175867
- Preceded by: More Sideways Arithmetic From Wayside School (1994)
- Followed by: Wayside School Beneath the Cloud of Doom (2020)

Wayside School Gets a Little Stranger is a 1995 children's short story cycle novel written by an American author, Louis Sachar, and is the third book in his Wayside School series. In the book, while the teacher on the 30th story of Wayside School, Mrs. Jewls, goes on maternity leave, her students must deal with multiple problematic substitute teachers.

== Plot ==
1. Explanation
Louis finally removes every cow that had crowded the school in the previous book. After 243 days, the students and faculty all return to the school. Todd is the one who is the most excited about returning to Wayside School out of everyone else, as he was sent to the most horrible school he had ever been to: the reader's.

2. A Message from the Principal
The principal of Wayside, Mr. Kidswatter, gives a seemingly kind and professional speech on the PA system. However, he forgets to turn the PA off upon finishing, and loudly expresses irritation about having to return from his extended vacation to Jamaica.

3. Poetry
The students are assigned to write poems about a specific color. Allison decides to write a poem about the color purple, but cannot think of a word that rhymes with "purple". Likewise, Rondi decides to write a poem about the color blue, but is overwhelmed by the amount of words that rhyme with "blue". When the poems are turned in, the students have written very strange poems about the colors they chose, while Rondi never got around to writing anything.

4. Doctor Pickle
The chapter introduces Dr. Pickell, who is also known as "Dr. Pickle", though his name is not the reason (it is pronounced with emphasis on the second syllable). Dr. Pickell is a psychiatrist who uses a pickle-like stone to hypnotize people and use aversion therapy to break bad habits. As a prank, he also adds an additional stipulation to their treatment. For example, when he helps a woman quit smoking by making her think her cigarettes feel and taste like worms, he also makes her slap her husband's face when he says the word "potato." He is ultimately disbarred from practicing psychiatry, so he becomes a counselor at Wayside School.

5. A Story with a Disappointing Ending
Mrs. Jewls sends Paul to visit the new school counselor, as he cannot control his urge to pull Leslie's pigtails. The psychiatrist uses a strange pickle-like stone to hypnotize Paul, making him think Leslie's pigtails are rattlesnakes when he tries to grab them, but also adding that he will see Leslie's ears as candy when he hears the word "pencil." After Paul returns to class, Leslie breaks her pencil, and borrows one from a classmate; this is all accomplished without saying the word "pencil."

6. Pet Day
All the students bring their pets to school. The pets have unusual names, leading to confusion from Mrs. Jewls. The chapter is structured similarly to Abbott and Costello's "Who's on First?"

7. A Bad Word
After Mr. Kidswatter spills coffee on his new suit when he bumps into his closed office door (it was supposed to be open), he declares "door" a forbidden word, and requires everybody to call doors "goozacks" from that point forward. Todd, who did not hear the announcement, shows up late to school and is subsequently punished for saying "door."

8. Santa Claus
It is almost Christmas, but Kathy is the only one in the class who does not believe in Santa Claus. When Louis comes into the classroom dressed as Santa, Kathy tries to prove that Santa is not real. Mrs. Jewls eventually resolves the situation by saying that Louis is one of Santa's helpers, and the class vows to help Santa even if he is not real.

9. Something Different About Mrs. Jewls
The kids, especially Dameon, suspect that something is different about Mrs. Jewls when they notice that she is eating strange things and getting overly emotional over everything that she sees. Their suspects are confirmed when Mrs. Jewls tells the class that she is pregnant and expecting her first child. Mrs. Jewls announces that she will take maternity leave, and a man named Mr. Gorf will substitute for her.

10. Mr. Gorf
The class waits for Mr. Gorf arrive; they remain on their best behavior, as they fear that Mr. Gorf is the husband of their harsh former teacher, Mrs. Gorf. Alerted by Myron, they realize that he has not arrived, and figure that he must be hiding, so they resume work as normal. Myron, however, cracks under the pressure. Using the freedom he obtained in the last book, he jumps on various desks, then onto the teacher's desk. The other students worry about his misbehavior, but he assures Mr. Gorf is not there, only to find him in the closet.

11. Voices
At first, Mr. Gorf seems like a nice teacher with a gentle Scottish accent, but then he reveals that he is Mrs. Gorf's son. Mr. Gorf has the ability to take away one's voice by sucking it up a third nostril in his nose. He can then mimic it perfectly just by touching his nose. He eventually steals every student's voice in the room and uses them to reassure other teachers that everything is normal. After a visit from Miss Mush, the lunch teacher, Mr. Gorf uses Kathy's voice to tell her, "Have a nice day!"

12. Nose
With his talent for mimicry, Mr. Gorf decides to take revenge on the class for causing his mother's demise. He calls the students' mothers and insults them using their own voices, mocking the children for being unable to stop him. However, Miss Mush foils him by smashing a pepper pie in his face, causing him to sneeze repeatedly until his nose falls off. Eventually, the voices he stole return to their rightful owners (although it takes a few minutes for the voices and students to line up correctly, due to the number of voices stolen). Miss Mush, upon hearing "Have a nice day!" in Kathy's voice, had decided that either Kathy had a change of heart, or Mr. Gorf could steal voices. Since Kathy would never be so friendly, she correctly assumed the latter. At the end of the chapter, it is revealed that Mr. Gorf's initial voice belonged to a Scottish man who lost his voice 20 years previously; because Mr. Gorf lost his nose, he is able to speak again.

13. The New Teacher
The second of the substitutes, Mrs. Drazil, arrives. She appears to be open and friendly, but Deedee suspects that she has a dark side, but cannot place why.

14. A Light Bulb, a Pencil Sharpener, a Coffeepot, and a Sack of Potatoes
Mrs. Drazil's class throws a light bulb, a pencil sharpener, a coffeepot, and a sack of potatoes out a window to see which one lands first. The coffeepot was borrowed from Mr. Kidswatter's office and has not been seen since the experiment. Afterwards, Leslie notes that the class will need a new pencil sharpener, causing Paul to lick her ears for saying the word "pencil."

15. An Elephant in Wayside School
All is well with Mrs. Drazil and the students, until Deedee realizes her suspicion; Louis had mentioned Mrs. Drazil in the previous book as his former teacher whom he hated. Upon meeting Mrs. Drazil again, Louis is forced to shave his mustache and finish a homework assignment he missed over 15 years prior. When he insults her, she places a wastepaper basket over his head.

16. Mr. Poop
With Mrs. Drazil watching him, Louis drops his casual, fun-loving personality, turning into a strict Professional Playground Supervisor. He refuses to let the kids play with the balls because they are filthy and improperly inflated, and later refuses to let the kids onto the playground because the blacktop is gray and needs to be painted black. A fed-up Joy throws his Professional Organization of Playground Supervisors (POOPS) handbook into the paint can.

17. Why the Children Decided They Had to Get Rid of Mrs. Drazil
The title is paradoxical to the entire plot. Most of the chapter displays Mrs. Drazil's positive qualities. It is noted that she is nice, patient, fair, and even a good cook. However, since she forced Louis to shave his mustache, the students decide that she must go.

18. The Blue Notebook
The students abscond with Mrs. Drazil's blue notebook, intent on reading it. In so doing, they realize that in order to get rid of Mrs. Drazil, they must find Jane Smith, a student that Mrs. Drazil dislikes more than Louis. Jane Smith left Mrs. Drazil a nasty note stating that she did not do her last twelve homework assignments; she also mentions that she is moving and will not say where. She closes her note by telling Mrs. Drazil to "rub a monkey's tummy with [her] head."

19. Time Out
Miss Zarves has a cow in her class, presumably left over from the events in the previous book. The cow continually distracts Miss Zarves to the point where she can no longer teach. She goes to Mr. Kidswatter to complain, but he does not see or hear her. Deciding that she does not feel valued, she finally storms out of the school, intending to quit. However, three mysterious men, one holding an attaché case, stop her and explain that her class needs her, and that her work is highly valued. Miss Zarves returns to her classroom feeling reassured.

20. Elevators
Elevators are installed in the school, but one can only go up and one can only go down. They work perfectly, but only once.

21. Open Wide
Jason has a dentist appointment with Dr. Payne, but his appointment is interrupted by a phone call from an irate mother who refuses to pay for her child's tooth extraction, because Dr. Payne pulled the wrong tooth. Jason overhears the dentist on the phone telling the patient's mother to "rub a monkey's tummy with her head," and subsequently confirms through her dental diploma that Dr. Payne is Jane Smith.

22. Jane Smith
Jason tells Deedee that he found Jane Smith, and they intentionally make Mrs. Drazil aware of Jane Smith's whereabouts, occupation, and name change. Later, Mrs. Drazil breaks into Jane's mansion, intent on forcing her to do her missed homework. Jane escapes in a motorboat, but injures her ankle when she jumps onto the concrete below on her way to the lake; Mrs. Drazil pursues her in a rowboat, and the two are never seen again.

23. Ears
This chapter introduces Miss Wendy Nogard, who has an ear on the top of her head that allows her to hear other people's thoughts. After her boyfriend, Xavier Dalton, ditched her upon discovering her third ear, she became bitter and hateful, intentionally hurting every man she dated by focusing on their negative thoughts. Meanwhile, Xavier began dating other women, but broke all their hearts, as he never fully realized his love for Wendy. Wendy especially hated children for being so happy and became a substitute teacher.

24. Glum and Blah
Miss Nogard arrives in class, and although the class appears eager, she intends to ruin their moods by listening to their thoughts and capitalizing on them. Calvin is embarrassed because he spilled orange juice on his lap, and Miss Nogard asks him in a whisper if he has to go to the bathroom. Dana worries that her new haircut makes her look like a boy, and Miss Nogard intentionally calls her a "young man." She regularly calls Jason by the name of his older, more successful brother, Justin, whom he loathes. D.J. has a song he hates stuck in his head, and Miss Nogard hums it constantly whenever he's nearby. Bebe has an itch on her leg, and when she stops thinking about it, Miss Nogard walks by and scratches her own leg. Jenny is going horseback riding after school, but after Miss Nogard lies about her nephew who went horseback riding on a rainy day and broke his limbs, Jenny becomes upset. At the end of the day, all the students are feeling "glum and blah", but they believe this is due to their own shortcomings.

25. Guilty
After Miss Nogard hears Maurecia's thoughts that she accidentally ripped a dictionary page, she purposefully has her confess to it. Upon Maurecia's confession, Miss Nogard makes her read both sides of the torn page to the class, then announces that there will be a test afterward, as the page is unusable and must be memorized, to the other students' dismay. Maurecia is unsure how Miss Nogard knew about her mistake, but decides that one of her classmates must have told her.

26. Never Laugh at a Shoelace
Mac forgets to bring something for show and tell, but the moment he realizes this, Miss Nogard calls on him. Low on ideas, he decides to use his shoelace; the other students are nonplussed. He invents a story about an African man named Howard Speed, the world's fastest runner, who lived before shoelaces were invented, which invests the rest of the class. Mac concludes that one should never laugh at a shoelace, and the entire class applauds.

27. Way-High-Up Ball
The three Erics play a game of "way-high-up ball", where they throw a ball to bounce on the school wall and get points equal to the number of stories the ball reaches. The player who catches the ball also scores the same number of points, so the thrower can double their own points by catching their throw. In the event that the ball does not hit the wall, no points are rewarded, and it is deemed a "glopper." While speaking to Louis, the other students ask if he has a crush on Miss Nogard, but he reasons that she's far above him, both physically and metaphorically. Finally, Louis attempts a throw; the ball never comes back down, as it hits somewhere between the 18th and 20th stories, and there is no 19th story.

28. Flowers for a Very Special Person
Louis brings flowers, intending them for Miss Nogard, but ultimately giving them to Mr. Kidswatter instead. Under his breath, he calls Mr. Kidswatter "a maggot-infested string bean", but when asked to repeat himself, he instead says "a magnificent human being".

29. Stupid
After Miss Nogard hears Ron thinking about how he did not complete his homework, she continually calls on Ron for the review, intending to humiliate him. She also always calls on students who got questions wrong and expresses her disappointment by assigning three pages of homework, in addition to redoing the previous homework. As a result, the students turn on each other, and Miss Nogard listens in on their bitter thoughts.

30. The Little Stranger
Mrs. Jewls returns with her baby daughter, Mavis. All the students immediately forget their anger and take turns holding the baby, though Miss Nogard seems unenthusiastic. She offers to hold Mavis, intending to drop her out the window, when she suddenly realizes that she has not heard a baby's thoughts before. According to the book, babies do not think in words, but rather in pure love and unconditional trust; as she listens in, her bitterness fades away. The students convince Louis to ask her out on a date, and Wendy accepts. She also reveals her third ear, which the class accepts without hesitation. Louis reaffirms his love for Wendy, who knows that it is genuine without reading his thoughts.

== Substitute teachers ==
=== Mr. Gorf ===
Mr. Gorf was the son of Mrs. Gorf (who tormented the students before being turned into an apple and eaten). He was never married, causing his students to think he was not related to Mrs. Gorf. He had three nostrils in his nose—the middle one had the power to steal people's voices and make them his own. He was so spiteful about the children taking his mother away that he used their voices to call their mothers and insult them. He then lost his own voice, along with the others, when he sneezed them all out, ultimately sneezing his own nose off. The voice he used when he first appeared was stolen from a Scotsman 20 years prior, and his real voice sounds like a French donkey with a sore throat. Even the Scotsman's voice is returned when Mr. Gorf loses his nose. His last name is "Frog" spelled backwards.

=== Mrs. Drazil ===
Mrs. Drazil keeps a blue journal of all the troublesome students she's had since she started teaching decades ago. She treats the Wayside School students nicely, but not her former students (including Louis). Her last name is "Lizard" spelled backwards.

=== Ms. Wendy Nogard ===
Wendy has an ear on top of her head that can hear thoughts. When she was dumped by her boyfriend Xavier, she began to make everyone's lives miserable. After listening to the thoughts of Mrs. Jewls' newborn child, she has a change of heart. She also falls in love with Louis and shows everyone her third ear. Louis says that he loves her too; she does not have to hear his thoughts, as she can see it in his eyes. Her last name is "Dragon" spelled backwards.

== Reception ==
John Sigwald, writing for School Library Journal, indicated that the stories in Wayside School Gets a Little Stranger "will surely tickle the funny bones of Sachar's fans," given the book's "hilarity, malevolence, romance, relentless punning, goofiness, inspiration, revenge, and poignancy." Kirkus Reviews similarly indicated that "Sachar's well-written, sophisticated comedy will appeal to everyone" as "Sachar proves once again that he is a master of all things childish."

Discussing the book's organization and other mechanics, Sigwald noted that the chapters in Wayside School Gets a Little Stranger "are miraculously conflated into a semicoherent story." Kirkus Reviews highlighted the book's "easy vocabulary, short chapters, and wicked pace", which they argue "make the book perfect for reluctant readers." Publishers Weekly, however, found that "the book's pace and punch seem to slacken midway through," with "the funniest vignettes [...] in the first half."

Like previous Wayside School books, Sigwald noted that the book has "an edge [...] that may disturb some adults," such as some of the substitutes who "are over-the-top mean." While comparing the book to those authored by Roald Dahl, Kirkus Reviews similarly mentioned that Wayside School Gets a Little Stranger's "humor is often anarchic, and sometimes in questionable taste, which will make the story a hit with early and middle grade readers."

Kirkus Reviews also found that "Schick's animated b&w drawings provide their own punch at the chapter openings."
