= CulverLand =

Temporary artwork in Culver City, California, US

Coordinates: 34.0239°N 118.3942°W

CulverLand from above.

CulverLand was a temporary artwork and functioning game in Culver City, California, United States, created by John Derevlany. It was funded by an arts grant from the City of Culver City, California, and installed as part of the 2010 Indiecade, the International Festival of Independent Games.

In "CulverLand," pedestrians were the playing pieces. Players would move forward on the game board based on the colors of passing cars. The colors of the gameboard in "CulverLand" - black, white, gray/silver, blue, red, and green - were based on the six most popular car colors in North America.

"CulverLand" was a sprawling work of Minimalism inspired by Piet Mondrian and, more importantly, Milton Bradley (maker of the game "Candyland"). It was meant to celebrate the play grid common in games, as well as finding a fun use for traffic. "CulverLand" was located near the Culver Hotel in Culver City, California, on the sidewalk just east of 9400 Culver Blvd. It was 90 feet long and 18 feet wide. Each square on the gameboard was 6 ft. X 6 ft. Most of the squares were installed with an eco-friendly, temporary marking paint called EZ-Paint. Lettering and logos were applied with giant, hand-cut plastic stencils and non-toxic Mythic paint.

"CulverLand" was scheduled for removal November 1, 2010.
