= Wayside (TV series) =

Canadian animated sitcom

- Also known as: Wayside School
- Genre: Animated sitcom
- Based on: Wayside School by Louis Sachar
- Developed by: John Derevlany; Louis Sachar
- Directed by: Riccardo Durante
- Voices of: Mark Rendall; Denise Oliver; Lisa Ng; Martin Villafana; Kathleen Laskey; Kedar Brown; Sergio Di Zio; Jayne Eastwood
- Theme music composer: James Robertson
- Opening theme: "Fly by the Wayside", performed by Skye Sweetnam
- Ending theme: "Fly by the Wayside" (instrumental)
- Composer: Scott Bucsis
- Country of origin: Canada
- Original language: English
- No. of seasons: 2
- No. of episodes: 26 (52 segments) + 1 movie

Production
- Executive producers: Scott Dyer; Doug Murphy; Lin Oliver
- Running time: 22 minutes
- Production company: Nelvana Limited

Original release
- Network: Teletoon
- Release: March 16, 2007 – January 15, 2008

Wayside (also known as Wayside School) is a Canadian animated sitcom developed by John Derevlany and produced by Nelvana Limited. The series follows Todd, a transfer student who attends Wayside, an offbeat 30-story grammar school. It is loosely based on the Wayside School books by Louis Sachar, and several elements differ between the two works.

Derevlany conceived Wayside in 2003, leading to an hour-long television special pilot titled Wayside: The Movie that aired in Canada on November 19, 2005, on Teletoon which was later greenlit into two seasons of Wayside consisting of thirteen half-hour episodes each, and aired from March 16, 2007, to January 15, 2008.

In the United States, the series aired its first 20 episodes between June 25, 2007 to February 14, 2008, on Nickelodeon. The show later moved to Nicktoons, where it aired its remaining six episodes from August 26 to September 18, 2008, and would continue to air in reruns until April 5, 2010.

Wayside received generally positive reviews from critics, who praised its clever and off-beat humour, though some criticized its differences with the Wayside School book series. The series was nominated for a "Best TV Series for Children" at the 2008 Cartoons on the Bay award ceremony. The pilot episode and the first season are both available on DVD. Both seasons are available on YouTube.

== Production ==
It was announced on April 5, 2006 during MIPTV that Nickelodeon purchased the worldwide broadcast rights to the series and came onboard as an commissioner.

== Premise ==
The full Wayside series.

Wayside takes place in the fictional Wayside School, an unusual Escher-esque 30-story grammar school. The school had been accidentally built "sideways", with one classroom in each of the 30 stories instead of 30 classrooms on one floor. Like in the books, there are actually 29 floors in the school; the imaginary 19th floor is inhabited by the imaginary Miss Zarves.

The series revolves around a transfer student at the school named Todd (voiced by Michael Cera in the pilot; Mark Rendall in the series), and his adventures adapting to life as a student on the 30th floor. Todd is taught by the scatterbrained-yet-endearing Mrs. Jewls (Kathy Najimy in the pilot; Kathleen Laskey in the series), who often sends him home early on the kindergarten bus for ridiculous misdemeanors. Todd's best friends are Maurecia (Denise Oliver), a rollerskating tomboy who has a crush on Todd; Dana (Lisa Ng), a Type A overachiever who obsessively maintains the school's rules and acts as Myron's campaign manager; and Myron (Martin Villafana), a self-centered student who wishes to become class president.

The school staff includes Mr. Kidswatter (Kedar Brown), the uptight and eccentric school principal who has an unusual vocabulary; Louis (Sergio Di Zio), the relaxed, friendly yard teacher at Wayside; and Ms. Mush (Jayne Eastwood), the Eastern European head chef of the school cafeteria and nurse who is best known for her wisecracking personality and horrible cooking skills. Minor members of the school faculty are Mrs. Gorf (Julie Lemieux), a substitute teacher for Mrs. Jewls who had the ability to transform her students into apples before being transformed into one herself by Maurecia; Le Chef (Peter Oldring), the former French chef in the teacher's lounge with an obnoxious demeanour; Mr. Blunderbuss (Dwayne Hill), the adventurous fourteenth-floor teacher who often goes on hunting safaris throughout worldwide jungles; and Miss Zarves, the nonexistent teacher on the nonexistent nineteenth floor.

Other students in the class are Shari (Lisa Ng), an overcoat-wearing girl who frequently sleeps in class; Stephen (Terry McGurrin), a boy who dresses like an elf for Halloween every day; Jenny (Denise Oliver), a stunt performer who dresses in an Evel Knievel-esque outfit and is Maurecia's best friend; John (Terry McGurrin), a boy who is always upside down; Joe (Peter Oldring), a student who has a large, red frizzy afro; the Three Erics (Terry McGurrin, Peter Oldring, Martin Villafana), three students with similar attire that typically do activities in unison; Bebe (Denise Oliver), a girl who is a master artist; Leslie (Lisa Ng), a girl who performs tasks with her long pigtails and usually looks angry; Rondi (Denise Oliver), a rather large girl who's almost always happy; and Elizabeth (Denise Oliver), who wears a purple dress and has lemon-colored hair.

== Episodes ==
Season	Episodes	Originally released	
Season	Episodes	First released	Last released
Pilot	1	November 19, 2005	
1	13	March 16, 2007	August 25, 2007
2	13	August 18, 2007	January 15, 2008

=== Pilot (2005) ===
Title	Directed by	Written by	Original release date	Prod. code
Wayside: The Movie	Riccardo Durante	John Derevlany (concept) & Lin Oliver	November 19, 2005	100
Todd gets transferred to Wayside School, a school that was accidentally stacked 30 stories high instead of 30 rooms sideways. He is assigned to Mrs. Jewls' class on the 30th floor, where he attempts to fit in with the class. However, due to his failure to cope with the school's unorthodox system of learning, Mrs. Jewls writes his name on the chalkboard and puts a check mark next to it, warning him that if another outburst will result in him getting sent home on the kindergarten bus. Meanwhile, due to faulty wiring, a trash compactor installed on the 30th floor activates whenever Principal Kidswatter uses the PA system. Todd, being the only one to notice, attempts to warn Mrs. Jewls about it but is sent home on the kindergarten bus. The next day, Mrs. Jewls and her class play dodgeball to decide who will become class president, with Dana winning the game. After discovering Wayside's blueprints in his "welcome binder", Todd tries to explain that the classroom is in fact a trash compactor, but is dismissed and sent home again. Meanwhile, Myron makes a speech on the PA, causing the trash compactor to activate once again, only this time the class notice it and start to panic. Todd sneaks back into Wayside and tries to find a way to free his class, while Louis stops Myron from continuing his speech, deactivating the trash compactor. However, soon after, Principal Kidswatter makes a long speech, reactivating the trash compactor once again. Todd eventually manages to free the class but Maurecia stays behind to help her pet porcupine. Todd goes in to save them but they end up being trapped. Thankfully, Myron finds the emergency shutoff, being the light switch, and is given the role of class president by Dana. Back in Mrs. Jewls' class, Dana gives Todd a new desk, which he throws out of the window, with the class now considering him a true "Waysider".

=== Season 1 (2007) ===
Episodes are listed in accordance to the season 1 DVD set.

No. overall	No. in season	Title	Canadian air date	American air date
1	1	"Pull My Pigtail" "Class Cow"	March 16, 2007	February 14, 2008
"Pull My Pigtail": It is Valentine's Day at Wayside School and Dana attempts to force Todd to fall in love with Maurecia by making him pull her ponytail. Meanwhile, Principal Kidswatter thinks Myron is his guardian angel. "Class Cow": While Mrs. Jewls is on a faculty retreat, a cow wonders into the class. The students (except Todd) believe it to be their substitute teacher and end up learning more from the cow.
2	2	"Meet the Pets" "Oh, Great Leader"	March 24, 2007	June 25, 2007
"Meet the Pets": After Todd talks about how he once lost a goldfish named King Arthur, everyone brings their pets into school and Todd must watch them so that he'd learn to be more "responsible". However, when the pets escape and run all over the school, Todd will need some help from his friends. Todd finally brings a new live fish named King Arthur the Second. "Oh, Great Leader": The students try to throw Principal Kidswatter a surprise birthday party, but he thinks they are trying to get rid of him, so he sends Todd to spy on the students.
3	3	"Honors Class" "Cabbage, My Boy"	March 31, 2007	July 6, 2007
"Honors Class": Maurecia is promoted to the Honors Class instead of Dana. Now she must "escape" it at all costs, while Dana tries to enter. In the end, we find out Mrs. Jewls' class is actually double Honors Class. "Cabbage, My Boy": Myron adopts a head of lettuce as his younger brother. Mrs. Jewls assigns an assignment dealing with families. Todd doesn't have any siblings, so he has to find a way to complete the project.
4	4	"Mascot Madness" "He is It"	April 7, 2007	June 26, 2007
"Mascot Madness": The tetherball team kids want Todd to be the new mascot so that they can finally win some games, but Todd does not want to, so Dana creates a giant version of his head for Myron to wear, and he becomes "Big-Head Todd". "He is It": During a game of tag, Todd tags Myron, who starts demanding special treatment, and because everyone has to follow the rules, no one can disobey him.
5	5	"Best Friendzzz" "Kindergarten King"	April 14, 2007	July 10, 2007
"Best Friendzzz": Myron and Dana have been best friends for a long time but one day after a falling out occurs between them, they decide not to be best friends anymore. So Myron becomes Shari's new best friend (although she is asleep, but uses a glass to hear what she's thinking) and Dana becomes Todd's new best friend. Meanwhile, Mr. Kidswatter tries to ease his stress with a new machine, called "The Wizomatic 3000", he bought for $19.99. At the end, Myron and Dana reconcile and become best friends again, and Todd tries Myron's brain-listening glass trick on Shari (only to find out it truly does work as he hears horses, pinball, and karate). "Kindergarten King": After being sent home early on the kindergarten bus by Mrs. Jewls after answering one of her questions on No Answering the Teacher's Questions Day, Todd saves a girl's stuffed dog, and the kindergartners make him their king, much to his chagrin and Myron's envy.
6	6	"Myron vs. Normy" "Age of Aquarium"	April 21, 2007	June 28, 2007
"Myron vs. Normy": In order to avoid getting in trouble, Myron pretends to be Normy, his made up twin brother. When he returns to the class, everyone thinks he is cool (and in Dana's case, sweet and cute) and they want him to be class president. However, Todd (and Shari) can see right through "Normy", and Todd tries to get Myron to tell everybody it is really him. "Age of Aquarium": On a Wayside field trip, instead of the kids going to the aquarium, the fish come to them. The classroom is filled with water and fish, but Todd has to sit it out in a life raft since he forgot his permission slip. Seeing this as a perfect chance to be alone with Todd, Maurecia eats her permission slip and has to sit with Todd. She spends her time trying to hold his hand, while underwater Dana tries to find something that will be interesting for Myron.
7	7	"Channel Kidswatter" "The Elevator"	April 28, 2007	July 2, 2007
"Channel Kidswatter": Principal Kidswatter wants to run a home-shopping channel out of his office, and gets the students to supply his cheesy inventory of trinkets under the guise of a new "arts" curriculum. Todd tries to prevent it from happening, but then works for it. So it is up to Maurecia and Jenny to stop the home-shopping channel. "The Elevator": The stairs are out of order and Todd puts his hand on the 1st floor sign, which is actually an elevator button. (The elevators in Wayside School only work when the stairs are out of order). Todd and Principal Kidswatter (Principal Kidswatter thinks it is the bathroom) go in the elevator, then the elevator becomes stuck between the 15th and 16th floors. Todd is stuck with a crying Principal Kidswatter in the elevator. To save them, Dana, Myron, and Louis become the Rescue Dudes, all calling themselves Louis.
8	8	"Mad Hot" "Mamaland Blues"	May 5, 2007	July 3, 2007
"Mad Hot": Principal Kidswatter challenges another school for the annual Wayside dance competition. He then picks a random team, consisting of Todd, Maurecia, Dana and Myron. "Mamaland Blues": Dana finds a marriage certificate that she thinks might make Miss Mush related to her.
9	9	"Principles of Principals" "Teacher's Parent Conference"	May 12, 2007	June 29, 2007
"Principles of Principals": Todd enters the "Principal for a Day" contest and wins. No one else has entered it because it is a trap, as the winner has to do everything on Kidswatter's super-long list. Todd decides to complete the list, and improve the school all in one day. "Teacher's Parent Conference": It is Teacher-Grading Day, and everyone in the 30th class must submit a report card on what they think of Mrs. Jewls. Todd, after hearing about this, gave Mrs. Jewls a bad mark on her classroom skills so that she will not send him home on the kindergarten bus. Now she must stay after school along with her father, Papa Jewls. He decides to send Mrs. Jewls to teach at a private school, so Dana and the other students decide to help Todd to "be a better student" so Mrs. Jewls can stay at Wayside.
10	10	"Rat in Shining Armor" "Mrs. Gorf"	May 19, 2007	July 12, 2007
"Rat in Shining Armor": It is the spring Halloween dance and everyone must dress up as something. Maurecia wants Todd to dance with her until Todd finally says no (because he got bounced half way across the room from her punch and he needed a break) and points out the fact that they are not going out after Maurecia thinks he wants to break up with her making her run away, crying. Feeling bad for Maurecia, Miss Mush puts her dead rat in an old knight suit so Maurecia has someone to dance with making Todd jealous. Todd finds out that it is Miss Mush's dead rat in the suit, so he exchanges costumes with him so Maurecia will not be heartbroken when she finds out. "Mrs. Gorf": The 30th floor class is on a camping trip on the 6th floor. Maurecia promises Todd she will not punch him in the arm if he sits with her. Todd does not believe her and says she will always try to punch him. Dana explains to Todd that she was never rough due to her kind nature back when Mrs. Gorf was their substitute teacher. From there Dana explains who Mrs. Gorf was and how different their class was before Todd came when Mrs. Jewls was sick.
11	11	"Todd Falls in Love" "French Fried"	May 26, 2007	July 13, 2007
"Todd Falls in Love": Todd arrives at school and finds out Maurecia has posted pictures of love posters about Todd all over the school. Todd decides he would do anything to prove that he will not be her boyfriend, so he eats Mush's mushroom surprise, that makes him fall in love with Mrs. Jewls. Maurecia finds out and tries to get Todd to like her again. "French Fried": A new chef, named Le Chef starts cooking for the teachers lounge (and later the students) which makes Miss Mush jealous and quits. To prove which cook is better, Miss Mush and Le Chef enter Todd's cooking challenge with Maurecia as the judge.
12	12	"Music Lessons" "Todd & Bull Story"	July 17, 2007	July 9, 2007
"Music Lessons": Myron discovers a strange nose flute called the Strumplefloozle, and uses it to control his friends. However, it also makes cows tear down the school. "Todd & Bull Story": After losing a match to La Boca Loca the bull, Principal Kidswatter starts crying on the PA. Todd tries to give "Make Me Happy" flowers to Kidswatter, but is told to put them in the basement with the other roses (because they remind him of his loss to La Boca Loca). When the kids mistake a pile of stage props for a Wishing Well, Todd makes their wishes come true. Kidswatter then makes them re-create a bullfight from his past.
13	13	"Louis Gets Some Class" "My Fluffy Hair"	August 25, 2007	July 11, 2007
"Louis Gets Some Class": Mr. Kidswatter finds out that Louis never passed his final exam, and sends him back to class. Myron gets upset that Louis is more popular than he is. Mr. K then calls in Mr. Osteo to give Louis his final exam. Later, Myron finds out that Louis did indeed graduate, as he found his real folder when he was in Kidswatter's filing cabinet. Mr. K says "Let me see this real folder" and it turns out Myron was right; Louis DID graduate and the one who didn't was Mr. K himself. "My Fluffy Hair": Fluffy feels rejected because he thinks Maurecia is paying more attention to Todd than to him, so he runs away. Mr. K finds Fluffy and mistakes him for a wig. Fluffy decides to use this "power" to get revenge on his mortal enemy, Todd.

=== Season 2 (2007–08) ===
No. overall	No. in season	Title	Canadian air date	American air date
14	1	"My Partner Gets All the Credit" "Daring Love"	August 18, 2007	June 27, 2007 (Nickelodeon)
"My Partner Gets All the Credit": Maurecia is paired with Myron in the Wayside Games, and since Myron is not a good athlete, she must do all of the work. However, every time she wins an event, Myron gets the credit, and Maurecia is starting to get angry with Myron. "Daring Love": After overhearing them on the playground, Todd is convinced that both Maurecia and Jenny are in love with him.
15	2	"Dana Checks Out" "My Biggest Fan"	September 1, 2007	July 5, 2007 (Nickelodeon)
"Dana Checks Out": When Dana is tired of organizing the class, Jenny lets her use her bike to see all 30 floors of Wayside, including the non-existent 19th floor. After Myron ruins the class, they must get Dana back. But before Dana rides into the 19th floor's boarded up room, Jenny was able to talk Dana out of it by revealing there was a good reason she's never seen the 19th floor. When Dana bumps Jenny's bike onto the ramp, it comes back, only with the seat signed by Mrs. Zarves. "My Biggest Fan": Mr. Kidswatter is Myron's hero. But when Todd, Dana, and Maurecia show Myron that Kidswatter does not even know his name, Myron sets out to find a new hero. Only to find out that he is actually Mr. Kidswatter's hero, his own hero, and his own biggest fan.
16	3	"Kidswatter: The Movie" "Safety Monitor"	September 4, 2007	October 16, 2007 (Nickelodeon)
"Kidswatter: The Movie": The kids are assigned to make a movie about Principal Kidswatter for the new movie making class, and Todd is cast in the lead role. However, he soon becomes even worse (if not just as bad) than the real Kidswatter. Todd, through tears in his eyes, says that his success has become a failure, but Myron interrupts, saying he could use that in the movie, only with more feeling. The class watches the Kidswatter movie, and after the ending, tears are in Kidswatter's eyes. "Safety Monitor": When Myron fails at being Safety Monitor, Maurecia takes over, and her idea of safety goes a little too far. Myron tries to reclaim his position, by ripping all of Maurecia's safety violation slips. Meanwhile, Kidswatter is taming a lion.
17	4	"Be True to Your Elf" "Sideways Protest"	September 7, 2007	October 17, 2007 (Nickelodeon)
"Be True to Your Elf": After Kidswatter says he cannot lead the parade (on account that his costume looks too similar to the leprechaun he encountered before), Stephen tries to be "Mr. Normal" so he can lead the school parade. Note: Beginning with this episode, the animation switches from hand-drawn to Adobe Flash. "Sideways Protest": Kidswatter decides to move the school, so all the students protest. All of their protests end up making the school better, so Kidswatter disguises himself as a student to stop them.
18	5	"Oh, Brother" "Snow Day"	September 18, 2007	October 19, 2007 (Nickelodeon)
"Oh, Brother": Goon, Dana's older brother, visits and Myron wants to be a rebel just like him, but he is not a rebel. Mrs. Jewls and Kidswatter try to capture him. Mrs. Jewls tells Todd, Maurecia, and Dana that Goon is a fugitive. Meanwhile, Todd and friends save Goon from being captured. "Snow Day": Mr. Kidswatter turns up the coldness for Mrs. Jewls' skating lesson. Myron, being the leader, traps the class with it and Maurecia's group. Todd's group learns how to survive. Later, Todd's group and Maurecia's group go to war.
19	6	"The Rat Truth" "Free Stewy"	October 3, 2007	October 18, 2007 (Nickelodeon)
"The Rat Truth": Sammy is terribly sick (but dead) so Miss Mush randomly asks Dana to watch him while she goes on a hunt for the golden pot of Mamaland that makes food to cure the sick. Sammy becomes a truth stick in Mrs. Jewls's class and is feeding words into his mouth. Later, Sammy is kidnapped by Mr. Kidswatter. "Free Stewy": Todd and Maurecia free an octopus who they think Miss Mush is going to cook. Kidswatter is now hunting for the creature since he thinks it ate his fish sticks.
20	7	"Extra Curricular Riddicular" "Wayside Christmas"	October 6, 2007	December 24, 2007 (Nickelodeon)
"Extra Curricular Riddicular": All the kids are forming bizarre after-school clubs, except for Todd, who creates a "Science Club". Myron laughs at him (only because he does not have a club), believing his club will be better, until he sees Todd's club has managed to build a functioning rocket. Jealous Myron tries to form a science club and build a rocket of his own. Myron accidentally launches the rocket Kidswatter is in and makes Todd cry. Todd wants to confront Myron, until Dana stops both of them from ruining more of their friendship. "Wayside Christmas": The school is celebrating Christmas, and Mrs. Jewls' class is decrorating and exchanging Secret Santa gifts. When Myron does not give Bebe a Secret Santa gift (because he only bought gifts for himself), he is ridiculed by the class and he runs away. Then a series of more haphazard events confuse Myron into thinking he is actually stuck in his own version of "A Christmas Carol". The other kids, including Todd, Dana and Maurecia, are baffled as he mistakes them for Ghosts of Christmas Past, Present (mistaken for Christmas Everyday by Myron), and Future (mistaken for Christmas Summer by Myron), and in the end, after a talk with Todd, Myron learns his lesson and feels foolish and guilty for what he has done. He decides to set things right and makes it up to the class by throwing a big Christmas party, and he makes it up to Bebe by giving her his paper crown. He then leads the class (plus Kidswatter) in singing a Wayside-themed version of "Deck the Halls".
21	8	"Le Race" "Imperfect Attendance"	October 17, 2007	August 27, 2008 (Nicktoons)
"Le Race": Ever since Kidswatter fired Le Chef, he has been trying to get revenge on Kidswatter. One day, Myron receives a note saying Kidswatter is to be challenged to a game of Parkour with the chef. Todd, Maurecia, and Dana then try to beat the match before Le Chef takes over the school. "Imperfect Attendance": Shari, Maurecia, Myron, Todd and Louis are all in need of help and they need Dana to help them. The only problem is, Dana is beating a record today of perfect attendance (1,448 days in a row). She then tries to beat the record and save the students before the bell rings.
22	9	"Kidswatter's Opus" "The Three Erics"	November 2, 2007	August 26, 2008 (Nicktoons)
"Kidswatter's Opus": Mrs. Jewls is sick. So the kids need a substitute. Unfortunately, all substitutes aren't available so Kidswatter has to step in as a substitute and teach everyone stuff the Kidswatter way. "The Three Erics": In Mrs. Jewls' class, Eric Bacon and Eric Fry are the ones getting picked and getting gold stars and Eric Ovens is never picked. Because he is the smallest Eric, he is not picked a lot. When Myron convinces Eric Ovens to become Myron Ovens, the Erics need another Eric who will do the same as them. Maurecia is picked just so she can be in the same column as Todd. But things get worse when Myron Ovens wants to become Eric again.
23	10	"Miss Fortune" "The Note"	December 18, 2007	August 27, 2008 (Nicktoons)
"Miss Fortune": It is a regular day at Wayside. Miss Mush suddenly asks Myron, Dana, Maurecia and Todd about their future careers. She makes bowls of Mushroom Surprise that tell the future at the bottom. Meanwhile, Kidswatter sees his future from the last time he ate Mushroom Surprise and wants to change it. "The Note": One day, Mrs. Jewls gives the class a pop quiz and the kids need to finish it by the time Mrs. Jewls gets a high score in pinball. During the exam, Maurecia tries to pass a note to Todd but accidentally gets it passed to Eric Fry who starts a chain of the whole class answering Maurecia's note. Todd now needs to get the note back from everyone including Kidswatter who gets lies saying the note says how much Mr. Kidswatter is liked.
24	11	"Myth of Nick" "Dr. Dana"	December 14, 2007	August 28, 2008 (Nicktoons)
"Myth of Nick": After hearing too many myths of a kid named Nick, Todd wants to take rid of them. He learns all of "Nick's" old tricks. Telling Maurecia, Dana, and Myron about the fake myths, Todd, with a snorkel over his mouth, dives in a can of beans, and comes out, speaking in a muffled voice. Meanwhile, Todd knows and tells the class that "Nick", who is Louis, exists. "Dr. Dana": Dana hosts a radio advice show that gives people advice. When Dana loses her voice and Myron takes over, the Erics take her to the nurse ("Miss Mush") and things in Wayside go out of control (including Fluffy coming after Stephen, Maurecia trying to punch Todd, Jenny is wearing a basket on her head, and upside down John's two feet punching each other). Dana's voice is restored, and she confronts Myron. She ends up canceling the show, and tells the people to ignore all the advice they received, much to Myron's chagrin. After yelling at Dana, Myron loses his voice, while Todd and Maurecia and the class are listening to Dana saying what Myron will do.
25	12	"Slow Mo Mo" "Joe 'N' Fro"	December 18, 2007	August 29, 2008 (Nicktoons)
"Slow Mo Mo": Maurecia loves being fast and first because of her wheels on her roller skates. But one day when Maurecia and Principal Kidswatter bump into each other (because of Maurecia's wheels), Kidswatter bans all round things from Wayside School including Maurecia's wheels and everything round becomes squared. She hates it because she is last, slow and late for everything. Kidswatter tries again and makes everything squared become round again. Meanwhile, Todd, Dana, and Myron join Maurecia. "Joe 'N' Fro": Kidswatter is planning his new lawn "gazebo" project. Joe manages to hide rabbits and a chipmunk in his large orange afro. But when a peanut is thrown at Todd's head, Todd, Dana, Myron, and Maurecia start to confront Joe until he also hides a squirrel in his hair and manages to get Mr. Kidswatter to put all of the trees back in the yard. Meanwhile, Myron is sneezing when standing near Joe and has everyone thinking he's allergic to Joe when he's actually allergic to the chipmunk. Then Todd, Maurecia, and Dana learn the specialness of Joe and his special afro.
26	13	"Upside Down John" "The Final Stretch"	January 15, 2008	September 18, 2008 (Nicktoons)
"Upside Down John": It is the 30th floor science fair today and John is showing his science volcano. However, he hates how it turned out. John then starts to think this is so because he does everything upside down. So, Todd, Myron, Dana and Maurecia try to help crying John get right-side up, just like the kids who are parallel and are upside down. In the end, Mrs. Jewls tells John, without the help from Todd, Maurecia, Dana, and Myron, that being upside down is not a bad thing. Meanwhile, Kidswatter is doing an I.Q. test to see if he is smart. "The Final Stretch": Principal Kidswatter's office and rubber band ball are destroyed, and he ask Stephen, Myron, Dana, Maurecia, and Todd who did it. A crying Stephen blames Myron, Myron says Dana did it by pulling one of the rubber bands off the ball, Dana says she only took the ball away from Myron because he kept chewing on it and blames Maurecia by crashing into the office, Maurecia says Todd did it by turning into a monster because of Maurecia's injuries, and Todd explains what really happened and says they cleaned it up before he got back. After Kidswatter talks to the kids, he then talks to one final witness, a cow, and the cow explains that it was all Kidswatter's fault in the first place. He unintentionally destroyed both his office and rubber band ball when he put another rubber band on the ball.

== Telecast and home release ==
In Canada, Wayside first aired as a stand-alone television pilot on November 19, 2005, on Teletoon. The series aired regularly on the channel on March 16, 2007, to January 15, 2008. Each half-hour episode consists of two 11-minute segments.

In the United States, Nickelodeon officially aired the series regularly on June 25, 2007, with its premiere episodes "Meet the Pets" and "Oh, Great Leader". The channel would continue to air the series up until February 14, 2008, shortly after an airing of the episodes "Pull My Pigtail" and "Class Cow". The show would later move to Nicktoons starting on August 26, 2008, with the episodes "Kidswatter's Opus" and "The Three Erics". The series finished its original run in the US on September 18, 2008, after a total of 26 episodes. Reruns continued to air in the United States until April 5, 2010.

In September 2007, the pilot episode of Wayside was released on DVD. The first season was released on August 19, 2008, under the title Wayside School: Season 1.

In 2018, the entire show and the pilot were released on Corus-based Keep It Weird's YouTube channel. In addition to the videos uploaded by Keep It Weird on YouTube, Wayside can be watched in a variety of other languages, as uploaded by Treehouse TV's numerous "Treehouse Direct" YouTube channels.

The series currently available to purchase on Apple TV and Amazon Prime Video. The series is also available to stream for free on Tubi and Roku Channel.

== Reception ==
=== Critical reception ===
Wayside has received generally positive reviews from critics. David Cornelius of DVD Talk described it as "a clever, often hilarious little show that demands a larger audience", praising the series' scripts and dialogue as "delight[ed] in mixing absurd humour with fond grade school memories". Adam Arsenau of DVD Verdict stated "The most satisfying part of Wayside is how the show feels perfectly balanced—it has enough wacky antics and bizarre events to satisfy young audiences, enough logical fallacies and defiant attitudes to amuse middle-aged kids, and enough clever and sardonic wit to please adults fortunate enough to find themselves in front of a television set while the show is playing", concluding that Wayside was "the perfect cartoon adventure for families of all ages". Emily Ashby of Common Sense Media gave the series 3 out of 5 stars; saying that, "This fast-paced series is packed with the zany characters and scenarios that young grade-schoolers will love. Even better, it's virtually free of content likely to bother parents".

However, the series also drew criticism for its differences to the Wayside School books on which it was based. Alyse Wax of Blogcritics negatively compared the animated series to the books that inspired it, stating that "the series 'doesn't have the magic that the books had', and noting that while the books provided 'wacky, silly, with odd, funny, almost-realistic-but-not-quite characters', viewers get no such character development from the animation, and expanded that while the show is shared from an adult perspective, it is not meant to be enjoyed by parents and kids" watching it together, being "geared towards younger kids". Joanna Weiss of Boston Globe offered that while viewers familiar with the character development in the book series will see that the animated series "understandably, dispenses with the nuance in favour of kid-friendly slapstick and goofy conceptual jokes", the children and parents who have not previously encountered the books "won't know what they're missing".

Michael P. Dougherty II of Fulve Drive-In gave a negative assessment of the series, describing it as "a disgrace to the novels" and believed it "totally strips away any intelligence or meaning they had". Dougherty also criticized the series' "total lack of ingenuity", and "coupled with the fact that it tainted the book series name makes this an awful, no good animated series". Louis Sachar, creator of the original Wayside School books on which the show was based, reportedly disliked Wayside, though he did like its animation style.

=== Awards and nominations ===
In 2008, Wayside received a nomination for "Best TV Series for Children" at the 2008 Cartoons on the Bay award ceremony.

== Differences from the books ==
There are a number of notable differences between Wayside and the Wayside School books. For example, in the series, a large number of changes were made to the character of Todd; in the book series, he is not a transfer student, although two transfer students appeared the book chronology, namely Sue and Benjamin Nushmutt. However, neither Sue nor Benjamin appear in the series, and Todd instead appears to take the latter's role as "new kid". Maurecia's personality also diverges from that of the series—in the books, she is a normal girl with a love for ice cream who is never mentioned nor depicted to wear roller skates and is almost always featured with her best friend Joy, who never appears in the series.
