= Wayside School Is Falling Down =

1989 children's novel by Louis Sachar

Wayside School is Falling Down
- First edition
- Author: Louis Sachar
- Illustrator: Joel Schick (first edition); Adam McCauley (second edition); Tim Heitz (third edition)
- Language: English
- Series: Wayside School
- Subject: Fiction
- Genre: Children's literature
- Publisher: Lothrop, Lee & Shepard (HarperCollins imprint)
- Publication date: March 22, 1989
- Publication place: United States
- Media type: Print (in Hardcover and Paperback)
- Pages: 179 pp (1st edition hardcover)
- ISBN: 0-688-07868-0 (hardcover)
- OCLC: 17620889
- LC Class: PZ7.S1185 Way 1989
- Preceded by: Sideways Stories From Wayside School (1978)
- Followed by: Wayside School Gets a Little Stranger (1995)

Wayside School Is Falling Down is a 1989 children's short story cycle novel by American author Louis Sachar, and the second book in his Wayside School series. Like its predecessor, it contains 30 stories, although some stories are interconnected in more complex ways than they were in the series' first book. Through-lines in the book include the introduction of a new student, Benjamin Nushmutt, and Allison's trip to the nonexistent Miss Zarves' classroom on the 19th story. The book's title comes from the favorite song of one character, Kathy, to the tune of "London Bridge Is Falling Down".

== Plot ==
1. A Package for Mrs. Jewls
After cleaning up the playground, which is covered in pencils and sheets of paper, Louis the yard teacher brings a heavy package to Mrs. Jewls's classroom, on the thirtieth floor of Wayside. Mrs. Jewls was teaching the class about gravity when a tired Louis entered carrying the heavy, fragile package. Upon opening the package, it is revealed to be a computer that Mrs. Jewls was going to use to teach the class about gravity. Mrs. Jewls then pushes it out a window and thanks Louis, noting that she was trying to teach the class about gravity by dropping pencils and paper, but the computer, heavier in weight, showed a much better demonstration. A stunned Louis leaves the classroom in shock.

2. Mark Miller
A nervous new student named Benjamin Nushmutt joins Mrs. Jewls' class, although the class, for whatever reason, thinks his name is Mark Miller. He tries to tell Mrs. Jewls his real name, but he is too shy. Because he feels ashamed of his real name, he eventually convinces himself that Mark Miller must be a better name, as he has become a popular student. Louis brings in Benjamin's lunch and leaves it on the teacher's desk, since there is apparently no one to claim it, as Benjamin realizes if he tells the truth now, Mrs. Jewls will think he is only saying it for the sake of a free lunch.

3. Bebe's Baby Brother
Bebe Gunn, whose grades have been slipping lately, has been turning in homework with nasty notes about Mrs. Jewls on it; when confronted, Bebe claims it was a trick by her younger brother, Ray, who is always causing trouble at home, and framing Bebe for it. She receives an A+ and a Tootsie Roll Pop to make up for it. Eventually, Mrs. Jewls phones Mrs. Gunn to tell her about Ray's behavior; Mrs. Gunn replies by asking who Ray is.

4. Homework
Mac disrupts Mrs. Jewls' lesson on fractions with a wild story about losing a single sock (as he could only find one half of them); he found it in his refrigerator the next day. Next, he disrupts a lesson on dinosaurs with stories about watermelons. In the end, Mrs. Jewls gives up and assigns extra homework, which Mac complains about to his girlfriend, Nancy.

5. Another Story About Socks
Sharie brings in a hobo named Bob for show-and-tell. Bob tells a little bit about his life story, most notably that he "doesn't believe in socks". He once won a spelling bee while not wearing any socks, and notes that Albert Einstein never wore socks either, although Bob's lack of wearing them has hindered his ability to find employment. When Mac tells him about his missing sock, he is surprised when Bob guesses that it was in his refrigerator. After he leaves, the students take this notion to heart right before their weekly spelling test by removing their own socks.

6. Pigtails
Paul struggles with his desire to pull Leslie's pigtails. When she announces that she is getting her hair trimmed soon and promises to save him some split ends, Paul gets excited enough to knock himself out the window. He nearly falls to his death, but manages to grab an extended brick, and hold on. Finding no other means to reel him back in, Leslie extends her pigtails to save Paul's life, and Paul vows to return the favor. Then he laughs and comments that this time, her pigtails pulled him.

7. Freedom
Myron wishes to be free like a wild bird he befriends, whom he names Oddly. He attempts to satisfy this desire by wandering into the school basement, subsequently getting lost. He eventually figures out he is being followed, so he throws both his shoes into the darkness and then makes a run for it; he is eventually met with three mysterious men (the same three that confronted Jenny Sideways Stories from Wayside School), one of which carries an attache case. They give Myron a choice — to be safe or to be free — reminding him that having it both ways is not an option and either way comes with consequences. Myron chooses to be free, gets one shoe back, and finds his way back to Mrs. Jewls’ classroom. When she assigns a test, Myron refuses to take it, as he is now free. She later finds his other shoe in the refrigerator of the teachers’ lounge.

8. The Best Part
Todd brings a toy dog to class that keeps him out of trouble and can transform into a vicious wolf. In a bid to use the toy to her advantage, Joy misses that last detail and has her finger bit.

9. Mush
The lunch special, for the 18th day in a row, is Mushroom Surprise. Due to his house running out of bread, Ron surprises everyone by reluctantly ordering it. Upon taking a bite, he finds the dish not too unappetizing, but then enters a trance and kisses Deedee on the lips, with no memory of the event afterward. The chapter ends when Mrs. Jewls enters the now-empty cafeteria just as Ron takes another bite.

10. Music
Benjamin tries to tell the class his real name, but his attempts are drowned out during music class. Each time Benjamin tries to tell Mrs. Jewls, the loudness of the class prevents her from hearing him. Additionally, the class misinterprets her requests for him to "speak louder" as an instruction to play their instruments louder, further hampering Benjamin's attempts. Finally, Mr. Kidswatter, the principal of Wayside, comes to Mrs. Jewls' class to relay complaints from other classrooms, telling her they cannot hear. She misinterprets the principal's complaint as a request to play even louder. Benjamin finally gets into the music class and decides to continue using his alias, feeling that "Mark Miller" plays music better than Benjamin Nushmutt.

11. Kathy and DJ
DJ becomes upset when he loses a watch given to him by his great-grandfather. Kathy tries to make him feel worse about it in order to amuse herself, but to no avail, as DJ continually refutes her insults. She only ends up even more dumbstruck when she finds out why he's upset: he worries that a bird may mistake it for food and choke on it. Eventually, Myron's bird friend Oddly returns it to DJ, and he rewards it to Kathy, mistaking her taunts for comfort.

12. Pencils
Jason has a bad habit of chewing pencils. After chewing up borrowed pencils from Allison and Rondi, Jason has an idea to help him stop chewing on pencils; sucking on a Tootsie Roll Pop instead. When he goes to ask Mrs. Jewls for one, she pulls out tape instead, solving the problem by literally taping his mouth shut. At the end of the day, she notes how quiet and well-behaved Jason has been, and considers taping everyone else's mouth shut as well.

13. A Giggle Box, A Leaky Faucet, and a Foghorn
Dana is always brought to extreme laughter, followed by lots of crying by animal stories in class, much to the annoyance of John and Joe, who call her "giggle box" and "leaky faucet", right after a story about a funny pig, and a wise spider who dies at the end, and a song about a brave dragon, and his young friend who are eventually separated. To add insult to injury, they even give her a box of tissue paper wrapped up like a birthday present. When Mrs. Jewls reads a story about a skunk whose mother is run over, Dana cries, and then blows her nose hard enough to warrant the nickname “foghorn”. Mrs. Jewls actually admires the girl's emotions, noting that it means she loves the stories a lot if she has such an emotional reaction to them. Dana then fears having a crush on John.

14. Calvin's Big Decision
Calvin announces that he's getting a permanent tattoo for a birthday present. Despite his classmates' many suggestions, he settles for a potato tattoo on his ankle. Though he notes the disapproval of his peers and Mrs. Jewls, he decides it does not matter. He feels sure he made the right choice, and he is the only one who will have to live with it for the rest of his life.

15. She's Back!
The students of Mrs. Jewls’ class claim to see Mrs. Gorf at random times on random spots around the playground. After relating his own bad experiences of his old teacher Mrs. Drazil, Louis watches for the former teacher while Deedee hangs from the monkey bars. Everyone feels assured when Mrs. Gorf does not seem to appear, though they ignore a larger set of footprints under the bars, made right next to Deedee's prints.

16. Love and a Dead Rat
Dameon is in love with Mrs. Jewls, but is the subject of taunting from the other students, when he attempts to deny it. To prove his statement, he takes up a dare from Joy and Maurecia to leave a dead rat in her desk. Eventually, he fesses up to Mrs. Jewls, who says that she forgives him; she explains that, while most objects are gone once given away, if she gives away love, she simply has more than what she started with. The dead rat, disgusted by the sentiment, comes back to life and walks away.

17. What?
Jenny comes late to class one day after reluctantly drinking prune juice during breakfast, which she hates. Upon arriving at class, she is disciplined for her tardiness, and she only manages to hear the punchline to the silly story. Not understanding the premise leading to the joke, Mrs. Jewls suggests that she reads the story herself, in reverse so she can instead be surprised by the set-up. She follows Mrs. Jewls' suggestion, but at the end of her reverse reading, she ends up regurgitating her prune juice. Fittingly, the chapter is written in reverse; it can be read in proper sequential order when each paragraph is read from back to front.

18. The Substitute
Mrs. Jewls’ class gets a substitute teacher named Miss Franklin, and the students plot to prank her. When “Mark Miller” decides to tell everyone that his real name is Benjamin Nushmutt, they think it to be a prank, and begin to claim that they are all named Benjamin. Despite the supposed prank, the day ends up being very productive. At the end of the day, Miss Franklin reveals that her first name is Benjamin as well, leaving the students unsure what to think.

19. A Bad Case of the Sillies
Allison wonders if her homeroom is really on the 29th story, since there is no 19th. After getting knocked down the stairs a short way by Ron and Deedee, in-between the 18th and 20th floors, tearing her jacket in the process, Allison proceeds to class and finds everybody ignoring her, especially when Jason accidentally swallows his pet goldfish. A frustrated Allison leaves the room and finds herself inducted into the classroom of Miss Zarves on the nonexistent 19th floor.

19. A Wonderful Teacher
Allison meets three other students of Miss Zarves’ classroom: a grown woman named Virginia, a teenage boy named Nick, and a slightly younger boy named Ray Gunn. None of them remember where they originally came from, but do not care, as they receive A's on all their work, no matter which answers are right or wrong. Allison soon starts forgetting her own origins, while Miss Zarves, while seemingly kind and complimenting everyone's efforts, provides incredibly tedious assignments, such as alphabetizing all numbers from zero to one million. The students in Miss Zarves' class work in 11-hour sessions with two-minute breaks, never leaving the room as nobody seems to need to eat or go to the restroom. During one break, Allison meets Mark Miller, who—in a twist of his counterpart in Mrs. Jewls’ class—is often called Benjamin Nushmutt.

19. Forever Is Never
Allison struggles to remember her origins while other students memorize the dictionary. Speaking to Mark, the two wonder if they may be in hell. Allison then realizes how Miss Zarves’ system works: assign busy work so the students have no time to think, make them memorize useless information so that they forget what is important, and show outward kindness and give good grades no matter what to keep them happy, so they will not. Allison then proceeds to reenact some of her old classmates’ mannerisms to frustrate Miss Zarves and ultimately escape. Following a sharp stabbing pain in her gut and foot, Allison wakes up back at the bottom of the stairs where Ron and Deedee pushed her. Ron and Deedee apologize, and they proceed to the 30th floor, where Jason introduces his pet goldfish.

20, 21, & 22. Eric, Eric, & Eric
As the previous three chapters are all labeled 19, this chapter is labeled 20, 21, and 22 simultaneously. Mr. Kidswatter calls each of the three Erics down to his office, asking them tough questions for an unclear reason. These questions include when they last sharpened their pencil, where they were the previous day at 12:15 pm, which hand is their dominant one, getting haircuts at Charley's Barber Shop, and the meaning of the phrase "Mugworm Griblick". Though the two overweight Erics (Fry and Ovens) answer honestly, the skinny Eric Bacon tells blatant lies, implying he is guilty of whatever Mr. Kidswatter is interrogating them about. After letting the three go, Mr. Kidswatter reexamines his evidence; a card from Charley's Barber Shop mentioning "Eric, Tuesday, 12:15 pm" with the message, “Mr. Kidswatter is a Mugworm Griblick” written in sharp pencil by a left-handed student.

23. Teeth
Rondi grows in her missing front teeth and thinks she no longer looks cute. To resolve this, she contemplates having Terrence punch out her front two teeth, so they would never grow back. The other students begin to compliment her, so she holds a poll to decide whether she should keep them. It ends in a tie, but Rondi decides that her new teeth are useful for eating carrots, so she decides to keep them. She then remembers that Terrence is about to punch her, and ducks just in time.

24. Another Story About Potatoes
Because Mrs. Jewls has ordered Miss Mush to dispose all the remaining Mushroom Surprise, she now serves potato salad. Joe orders some, although he is the only one, as everyone else orders nothing, some even going back for seconds of "nothing". Joe and John then mix ketchup and mustard into the potatoes, and shape it into Mrs. Gorf's face, and it immediately comes alive. They triumph over this menace by eating it, and they turn out to actually enjoy it and go back for seconds.

25. A Story That Isn't About Socks
Stephen dresses up in a three-piece suit for picture day, determined to look handsome and important. Mrs. Jewls and his classmates marvel at his outfit, although they are all dressed in crazier outfits. Maurecia and Todd (and Mrs. Jewls) are dressed for the beach, Deedee and Paul are both dressed for a sleepover, Bebe and D.J. are both dressed for a costume party, etc. Stephen shows the class that the more he tightens his tie, the more handsome he looks. The kids find it very funny and encourage him to tighten his tie even more, and Stephen does so, which starts to make him choke. Soon, he pulls his tie so tightly that it rips in half. Stephen fears that he no longer looks good, but Mrs. Jewls assures him that what he wears on the inside counts, so if he wants to look important, he'll have to wear expensive underwear.

26. The Mean Mrs. Jewls
The chapter explains that, within every seemingly nice teacher, there is a mean teacher waiting to come out. Mrs. Jewls attempts to teach the class the capital of England, seven plus four, and how to make pickles, but none of them understand. A voice in her head tells her to be rotten whenever the students do something wrong, regardless of how or what she teaches. After Leslie answers a question wrong, Mrs. Jewls threatens to dump pickle brine on her until Paul intervenes, drenching the teacher instead. As punishment for behaving improperly, Mrs. Jewls sends herself home early on the kindergarten bus.

27. Lost and Found
After Joy steals and eats her lunch, an unsuspecting Maurecia looks for it but finds a paper bag containing $20,655 instead. Joy insists on spending it for themselves, but Maurecia gives it to Louis instead, who keeps it in the lost and found. Some time later, the owner of the cash—a former pencil maker named Mr. Finch—arrives to claim it. Mr. Finch spent fifty years of his life making pencils, which he hated, to support his dream of opening an ice cream parlor. After losing the money, he feared he'd have to return to pencil-making. As a reward for Maurecia's honesty, he gives her $500 and a lifetime supply of free ice cream. Joy, seeing an opportunity, mentions that she stole Maurecia's lunch. Mr. Finch merely gives her a pencil.

28. Valooosh
An eccentric dance instructor with a thick accent named Mrs. Waloosh teaches a dance class at Wayside, in lieu of regular P.E. She teaches all of Mrs. Jewls' students (except for Myron, who used his newfound freedom to ditch and go to P.E.) how to "tango"; in her class, this entails her partnering with each student, and throwing them into the air. As the students dance with each other, they cannot lift or throw one another like that, so they compensate by throwing kickballs at each other, and other types of horseplay. When the session ends, the bruised and bleeding participants are eager to return, while also speaking in the same thick accent.

29. The Lost Ear
As report cards are soon to be handed out, Benjamin once more attempts telling the class his real name, but then Mac tells a story about a hippie who lost his ear in a hair-cutting accident. Although Benjamin succeeds, his fear of being shunned is laid to rest when the others relate their own unusual experiences from earlier chapters. Mrs. Jewls even gives him the unclaimed lunch that has been sitting on her desk for most of the year. Later, Allison encounters Mark Miller from Miss Zarves’ class. He holds a bag containing an ear like the one from Mac's story, which he states Miss Zarves told him to take to the hospital. Suddenly, she has a revelation, and everything briefly makes sense, but she soon forgets.

30. Wayside School Is Falling Down
A brewing storm makes a fire drill go awry when Mrs. Jewls’ class panics in various ways. Mrs. Jewls rings her cowbell so many times that the resulting sound is carried across the wind, attracting a herd of cows that fills the entire building. As a result, Wayside School temporarily closes down; the teachers and students are relocated to other schools, while Louis stays behind to remove the cows.

== Reception ==
Kirkus Reviews referred to the stories in Wayside School Is Falling Down as "rib-tickling tales", while Publishers Weekly called them "tongue-in-cheek, slightly madcap stories", noting that they're "sure to appeal to the slightly caustic humor that is typical of middle readers". Similarly, School Library Journal's Anne Connor noted that the book, with its "bad puns, extended jokes, and an irreverent attitude", may leave adult readers feeling "quizzical", but "children who relish the ridiculous will enjoy themselves tremendously." Booklist's Carolyn Phelan also found "Sachar's humor [to be] right on target for middle-grade readers".

Kirkus Reviews also discussed the "simple, evocative line drawing[s]" that preface "each short episode", noting, "Sachar has a gift for having fun without poking it too sharply, and beneath all the frivolity there very often lurks some idea or observation worth pondering."

Phelan also discussed the book's inclusion of fantasy elements, as well as Sachar's "playfulness with literary conventions".

While Phelan indicated that the stories felt connected, Connor found them to be "only loosely tied together" and that "many have a shaggy dog quality".
