= Sideways Stories from Wayside School =

1978 children's novel by Louis Sachar

- First edition
- Author: Louis Sachar
- Illustrator: Dennis Hockerman (first edition); Julie Brinckloe (second edition); Adam McCauley (third edition); Tim Heitz (fourth edition); Peter Allen (UK; first edition); Aleksei Bitskoff (UK; second edition)
- Language: English
- Series: Wayside School
- Genre: Children's literature
- Publisher: Harcourt Brace Jovanovich
- Publication date: January 1, 1978 (first edition) May 6, 1985 (second edition) May 6, 2003 (third edition) January 14, 2004 (fourth edition)
- Publication place: United States
- Media type: Print (in Hardcover and Paperback)
- Pages: 141
- ISBN: 0-695-80964-4
- Followed by: Wayside School Is Falling Down

Sideways Stories from Wayside School is a 1978 children's short story cycle novel by American author Louis Sachar, and the first book in the Wayside School series.

The novel was later adapted into a Teletoon animated series, Wayside.

== Setting ==
The story takes place in the fictional Wayside School, a school that was meant to be built one story tall with 30 classrooms all in a row, but was instead built 30 stories tall with a single classroom on each floor, save for the nonexistent nineteenth story. The book is primarily set in Mrs. Jewls' class, which is located on the thirtieth story of Wayside School, and each chapter focuses on a different student or teacher at the school.

== Chapters ==
1. Mrs. Gorf
This chapter introduces the classroom on Wayside School's 30th floor. Their teacher, a strict woman named Mrs. Gorf, turns her students into apples if they misbehave even slightly, or answer a problem wrong. At times, Louis the yard teacher visits and assumes that Mrs. Gorf must be an excellent teacher if so many children give her apples. Mrs. Gorf eventually turns all the students into apples, but the students, led by Todd, force her to change them back into humans. She gets angry and tries to turn them into apples again, but Jenny holds up a mirror in front of Mrs. Gorf, and Mrs. Gorf turns herself into an apple. Louis then comes in, sees the apple, and—unaware that it is actually Mrs. Gorf—shines it up on his shirt, and eats it.
2. Mrs. Jewls
Mrs. Jewls becomes the new teacher after Mrs. Gorf is eaten. When Mrs. Jewls first sees her students, she figures that they must be monkeys, because Mrs. Jewls has never seen children so cute. After the students convince her that they are not monkeys, Mrs. Jewls begins teaching normally, though the students liked her original idea better.
3. Joe
Joe is a student who cannot count properly, but always ends up at the correct answer anyway. Mrs. Jewls holds him back during recess and attempts to teach him, but finds herself unable to do so. After recess, the other students make fun of Joe, but Mrs. Jewls reassures him that he will wake up one day and suddenly be able to count. Joe asks why he has to go to school, and Mrs. Jewls explains that school speeds it up; if he did not go to school, it could take him 70 years to learn, and by then he would have no hair. The next day, Joe wakes up and realizes he is indeed able to count correctly. Joe counts every hair on his head, totaling to 55,006.
4. Sharie
Sharie has big eyelashes and an oversized coat, and she tends to sleep through class. Mrs. Jewls does not care; she thinks students learn best when sleeping. One day in class, while sleeping, Sharie falls out the window. Louis saves her at the last moment.
5. Todd
Todd is a good student, but he always gets in trouble due to Mrs. Jewls' selectively enforcing the rules, as he was the first student to speak out loud in her class. Her class works on a three-strike system: first, the student's name is written on the board, then a checkmark is written next to it. Upon receiving a third strike, the name is circled, and the student is sent home early on the kindergarten bus. While working on his workbook, Todd is harassed by Joy, but gets punished for speaking out. Suddenly, robbers enter the classroom, having mistaken the building for a bank. Todd averts the situation by giving Joy's workbook to the robbers. Despite this, Todd is still sent home early on the kindergarten bus, though he receives a standing ovation upon leaving.
6. Bebe
Bebe Gunn is the "fastest draw" (quickest drawer) in class, able to draw pictures faster than anyone else. She can produce a picture of a cat in under 45 seconds, a dog in less than 30 seconds, and a flower in less than eight seconds. In one art class, with the assistance of Calvin, she makes 378 works of art in one hour. Mrs. Jewls tells her that the quality of art is more important than the quantity; in her words, if a single picture produced by a single person over the course of a lifetime is better than each of Bebe's pictures, the person with only one picture has produced more art than Bebe. Distraught, Bebe subsequently goes home to begin a picture of a cat; she indicates that she probably will have barely begun by the next day.
7. Calvin
Calvin is sent by Mrs. Jewls to deliver a nonexistent note to the nonexistent Miss Zarves on the nonexistent nineteenth floor. He consults Louis, who tells him that he is "not supposed to deliver no notes to no teachers". Upon returning to the 30th floor, Mrs. Jewls thanks a dumbstruck Calvin, who ultimately decides it was nothing.
8. Myron
Myron becomes class president, whose only job is to turn the lights on before everyone arrives and turn the lights off in the afternoon after everyone leaves. Myron, unsatisfied, wonders if there is more to being class president. Subsequently, he saves the life of Dana's dog Pugsy, but is demoted due to arriving late to class the next day. Stephen becomes the class president after Myron.
9. Maurecia
Maurecia eats ice cream every day for lunch. After Maurecia has tried all the ice cream flavors, she no longer likes ice cream. Mrs. Jewls decides to make ice cream flavors based on each student, which each taste differently to everyone but their namesake (who instead tastes "the flavor they taste when they aren't tasting anything"). Everyone likes Maurecia's flavor the best, but Maurecia likes Todd's the best.
10. Paul
Paul is unable to resist the temptation to pull Leslie's pigtails. When he pulls on them, Leslie yells out in pain. Paul pulls one of her pigtails, earning him his name on the board, and then, after a brief struggle (including a hallucination of the other pigtail talking), he pulls the other pigtail, thus earning him a checkmark. Paul figures that he can pull Leslie's pigtails twice a day with impunity, until Leslie yells out in pain again. Paul's name is then circled, and he is sent home early; it is suggested that Paul did not actually pull Leslie's pigtails the third time, and that Leslie's yell was unprovoked so he would go home.
11. Dana
Dana, a student with glasses, is suffering from a number of mosquito bites that prevent her from focusing in class. Mrs. Jewls turns the mosquito bites into numbers in arithmetic problems so that they do not itch anymore.
12. Jason
After Jason gets Joy in trouble for chewing gum, Joy puts her chewing gum on Jason's chair, so that Jason gets stuck. After several unsuccessful attempts to get Jason unstuck from his chair (hanging him upside down and pouring ice water to freeze the gum), Mrs. Jewls decides that the only solution is to cut Jason's pants off. However, a solution is eventually reached when Joy kisses him on the nose, causing him to fall out of his chair. Joy was to be sent home early for getting Jason stuck to his chair, but because she got him unstuck, the punishment was rescinded.
13. Rondi
Rondi is a student who is missing her front two teeth. She is very confused when other people compliment her about the nonexistent things she has (particularly her missing two front teeth). When Louis compliments Rondi on her two missing front teeth, she becomes fed up and bites him. It is said that a bite with missing teeth is even more painful than one with the teeth still in place.
14. Sammy
On a rainy day, a new kid named Sammy comes to Wayside School. However, something about him does not seem right due to his odor, crass personality, and many raincoats. As Mrs. Jewls attempts to remove his raincoats, each one smellier than the previous, Sammy begins to insult her and the other students; she writes his name on the board, checks it, circles it, and (in an unusual extension of the violation system) draws a triangle around the circle. After removing all of Sammy's raincoats, all that remains is a dead rat. Because Mrs. Jewls dislikes dead rats, Sammy is thrown away. It is revealed that dead rats frequently try to sneak into her classroom, this being the third since September.
15. Deedee
This chapter is introduced as a story with a problem and a solution. Deedee, a mousy-looking student, is unable to get a high-bouncing green ball or a decent red ball at recess; instead, she ends up with the one yellow ball, which does not bounce and never goes the direction it is kicked. Even when running as fast as she can, Deedee is still unable to reach the playground in time, as her class is on the 30th floor. Deedee's solution is to disguise herself as a dead rat, knowing Mrs. Jewls' dislike of them. She is immediately thrown out to the playground, allowing her to get a green ball.
16. D.J.
D.J. is happy, and it spreads through the whole class, including the room itself, but he will not tell why. D.J.'s explanation is that no reason is required to be happy.
17. John
John is a student with a round head who can only read upside-down. Mrs. Jewls says that the only solution is to stand on his head. Using a pillow, John attempts to stand on his head, but keeps falling over due to his round head. Eventually, John finds his center of balance, but falls flat on his face; this evidently flips his brain over, thus allowing him to see words right-side up. When Mrs. Jewls tells him to put the pillow under her desk and get a Tootsie Roll Pop from the can on top, he places the pillow on top and fails to find the can of lollipops underneath.
18. Leslie
Leslie cannot figure out what to do with her toes, since she thinks they are useless. Leslie tries to sell them to Louis for 5¢ each (a total of 50¢), but then he lowers the offer price on her six smaller toes to 3¢ each (a total of 38¢). When Leslie refuses to sell the small toes at that price, Louis offers her 10¢ total for the two big ones; she refuses to sell her toes unless as a complete set, thus losing the deal. When Louis asks if she would be willing to sell her pigtails instead, Leslie calls him crazy.
19. Miss Zarves
Miss Zarves is the teacher of the nineteenth story of Wayside school. However, there is no nineteenth story of Wayside School, which means there is no Miss Zarves. The book apologizes for the absence of a nineteenth chapter (a nineteenth "story") and moves on.
20. Kathy
Kathy hates everyone, especially the reader, even though she has not met them. Kathy's reasoning is often self-fulfilling. When Kathy is afraid of her pet cat running away, Mrs. Jewls tells her that he will not if she cares for him properly. To prove her wrong, Kathy locks her cat in a closet, and he subsequently runs away, proving Kathy right. Similar examples are given, such as playing catch with Dameon (she is afraid of being hit by the ball, so she closes her eyes and refuses to catch, thus getting hit anyway) and receiving a cookie from Allison (she thinks it will not taste good, so she does not eat it until three weeks later, when it is stale and dusty). The chapter concludes that Kathy hates the reader because she knows they would not like her.
21. Ron
Ron wants to play kickball, but nobody wants to play with him because Ron is not a great kicker due to his little feet. Louis teams up with him against the whole class, proving successful when Ron is pitching, but unsuccessful when Ron is kicking. The chapter ends with Louis chiding Ron for his poor kicking; Ron punches him, which is apparently much harder than his kick.
22. The Three Erics
There are three students in Mrs. Jewls' class named Eric: Eric Bacon, Eric Fry, and Eric Ovens. The students give each Eric a negative, stereotyped nickname that does not match his personality but reflects a trait that the other two have. Eric Bacon, the skinniest child in the class, is nicknamed "Fatso", because the other two Erics are overweight. Eric Fry, the best athlete in the class, is nicknamed "Butterfingers", because the other two Erics are not so good at sports. Eric Ovens, the nicest student in the class, is nicknamed "Crabapple", because the other two Erics are mean (Eric Bacon is mean since everyone calls him "Fatso" while Eric Fry is mean because he always had to play right field).
23. Allison
Allison is kindhearted and generous, but has a short temper and often threatens to knock people's teeth out, as she supposedly did to Rondi. Throughout the chapter, Allison returns favors to each teacher she meets (lending a book to the librarian, giving food to the lunch lady Miss Mush, and returning a ball to Louis). At the end of the chapter, she helps Mrs. Jewls with an arithmetic problem (spelling the word "chair"), and in return, Mrs. Jewls reveals a secret: students are really smarter than their teachers. Allison claims that everyone knows that.
24. Dameon
Mrs. Jewls wants to know if Louis will join the class to watch a movie, so she tells Dameon to ask him. Dameon has to repeatedly run up and down all 30 flights of stairs while Louis asks questions about the movie, which is about turtles. Ultimately, Louis declines to watch the movie; he does not like turtles, because they are too slow. Afterwards, each student writes a paper about the movie. Since Dameon missed the movie, he decides to write that turtles are too slow. However, Dameon dropped his pencil on his way back up, and Louis returns it to him. To prevent this from happening again, Mrs. Jewls requests that each student write their name on their pencil. Dameon cannot figure out how to write on his pencil with just his pencil, comparing it to how his eyes cannot see themselves.
25. Jenny
Jenny arrives to school late, but everyone in her class is missing. Unsure of what to do, she decides to work on spelling. Jenny is eventually approached by a mysterious man with an attache case, who begins questioning her. After consulting with two other mysterious men, they decide that Jenny does not know anything, and they let her go. Before they leave, they remind Jenny not to come to school on a Saturday.
26. Terrence
Terrence is a good athlete, but a bad sport. Whenever other kids try to play ball games with him, he invariably kicks the ball over the fence. Ultimately, there are no balls left, so the kids get Louis to kick Terrence over the fence.
27. Joy
Joy forgets her lunch, but she notices Dameon's lunch (a turkey sandwich, a slice of chocolate cake, and an apple) and decides to steal it when he is not looking. To deflect the blame, Joy places the leftovers on other students' desks. Eventually, Joy's mother arrives with her missing lunch (an old bologna sandwich and a dried-up carrot), which Joy offers to Dameon. As a reward for her generosity, Mrs. Jewls offers her a Tootsie Roll Pop, and she takes another while nobody is watching. However, the story notes that while Joy had a great lunch and Dameon had a bad lunch, it did not matter to either of them what they tasted like five minutes later. For the rest of the year, however, whenever Joy eats any of the foods that she took from Dameon, they instead taste like Miss Mush's porridge.
28. Nancy
A boy named Nancy and a girl (in a different class) named Mac are both embarrassed by their names, so they decide to trade. However, when the rest of the class hears about this, they want to trade names as well. Due to the ensuing confusion, nobody knows whose name belongs to who. Ultimately, everyone agrees to use their original names, except for Mac, who keeps his new name. Only the three Erics are unsure of what their original names were.
29. Stephen
Stephen is the only one dressed up for a Halloween party; according to him, since Halloween falls on a Sunday that year, it should be celebrated the Friday before. After a 30-second party, Mrs. Jewls continues with her lesson, much to Stephen's disappointment. Suddenly, the ghost of Mrs. Gorf appears to take her revenge. Mrs. Gorf explains that she can haunt the classroom because Halloween falls on a Sunday, so it should be celebrated the Friday before. Feeling validated, Stephen hugs Mrs. Gorf, which causes her to disappear.
30. Louis
Louis is revealed to be the author of the book. When recess is canceled due to a June blizzard, he tells a story to Mrs. Jewls' class about a normal school where students were never turned into apples, sold their toes, traded names, or even had Maurecia-flavored ice cream. The students find this story odd, and Mrs. Jewls chides Louis for making up a fairy tale. When told to thank him, everyone in the class boos.

== Background ==
Sideways Stories From Wayside School is Sachar's first published book. Many of the children in the book are modeled after real students at Hillside Elementary School, and Louis the yard teacher was based on himself.

== Reception ==
The Atlantic called it an "early primer for young readers who will eventually find their way to more profound surrealism."
