= Stanley Yelnats' Survival Guide to Camp Green Lake =

2003 novel by Louis Sachar

- First edition cover
- Author: Louis Sachar
- Illustrator: Jeff Newman
- Cover artist: Bagram Ibatoulline
- Language: English
- Series: Holes series
- Genre: Young adult
- Publisher: Yearling Books
- Publication date: March 11, 2003
- Publication place: United States
- Media type: Print (paperback)
- Pages: 96 pp (first edition)
- ISBN: 0-440-41947-6
- OCLC: 51849580
- LC Class: MLCS 2006/42289 (P)
- Preceded by: Holes
- Followed by: Small Steps

Stanley Yelnats' Survival Guide to Camp Green Lake is a 2003 companion book for young adults by Louis Sachar, first published by Yearling Books (an imprint of Random House). It is the second in a series inaugurated in 1998 by the award-winning Holes and was published a month before the release of the film version of that novel.

Survival Guide is a "tongue-in-cheek handbook for newcomers" to Camp Green Lake, for a "more pleasant" trip than the one featured in Holes.

As of May 18, 2003, the book was ranked 8th by The New York Times on its list of bestselling Children's Paperback Books.
