= Johnny's in the Basement =

1981 novel by Louis Sachar

- First p/b edition
- Author: Louis Sachar
- Language: English
- Publisher: Knopf (h/b); Avon Books (p/b)
- Publication date: 1981
- Publication place: United States
- Pages: 128
- ISBN: 0-679-90411-5

Johnny's in the Basement is a children's novel by the author Louis Sachar, the author of the National Book Award and Newbery Medal winning novel, Holes. This book was published in 1981, by Knopf. It is Sachar's second book (Sideways Stories from Wayside School was his first, in 1978). The book's title is a reference to the song "Subterranean Homesick Blues" by Bob Dylan, which begins with the line "Johnny's in the basement mixing up the medicine."

== Reception ==
The book remained popular for many years. According to WorldCat, the book is held in 446 libraries.

Reviewers consider the book "full of sly humor", and "another corker" It is also described as "a preadolescent way to show contempt for adults' exploitation." A film named Johnny's in the Basement was planned, but it was canceled on May 2, 2003.

== Plot summary ==
Johnny Laxatayl, who has just turned 11 years old, goes in the basement where nobody bothers him. Johnny's parents want him to grow up and go to dance class. They also want Johnny to get rid of his bottle cap collection. At dance class, Johnny meets a girl named Valerie who also hates dance class, but likes Johnny. Johnny sells his bottle cap collection, and he and Valerie spend the $86.33 they receive for it on miscellaneous impractical items.
