= The Mighty Miss Malone =

2012 novel by Christopher Paul Curtis

- Author: Christopher Paul Curtis
- Language: English
- Publisher: Wendy Lamb Books
- Publication date: January 10, 2012
- Publication place: United States
- Media type: Print (Hardcover)
- Pages: 320 ppg
- ISBN: 0385734913
- Preceded by: Bud, Not Buddy

The Mighty Miss Malone is a 2012 children's novel by author Christopher Paul Curtis and is a follow-up to his 2000 book Bud, Not Buddy. Wendy Lamb Books released the book on January 10, 2012. The Mighty Miss Malone follows the character of 12-year-old African-American Deza Malone, who narrates the book.

== Synopsis ==
Deza Malone's family has the motto "We are a family on a journey to a place called Wonderful" and Deza is consistently marked in her school as someone who is sure to go far in life. However, Deza's family is too poor to help her take advantage of her talent. For example, Deza's family cannot afford dental care for her. This specific problem leads to a scene in which Deza overhears her father, in a conversation with Deza's mother, say, ‘I can’t breathe out of my nose when I’m near Deza because of the smell of her teeth. How sick is that?’ But despite the harsh circumstances that she lives under, Deza still has parents that love her, a great teacher, Mrs. Needham, and the perfect best friend, Clarice Anne Johnson. Deza looks forward to receiving special summer tutoring from Mrs. Needham with her best friend. However, when the Great Depression hits Deza's hometown of Gary, Indiana, her father loses his job and must travel in order to find work. Although Deza's mother was supporting the family by working as a domestic, when she loses her job, the Malones are put out on the street. Before Deza's father can write to have the family join him, Deza's mother uproots the family and goes out in search of Deza's father. Then, Deza and her brother end up in a Hooverville Shack outside Flint, Michigan. As life continues, Deza's brother Jimmie leaves the camp hoping to become a performer while Deza and her mother try to carry on in the hopes of finding Deza's father. Deza goes off to find Jimmie when she learns that he is making it big in Detroit. (Deza's father gets in a boat accident and almost dies.)

== Background ==
Christopher Paul Curtis’ inspiration to write this book came from his fans. Because many of his fans requested that he write a book with a female protagonist, Curtis chose to write a book about a female side character from his book Bud, Not Buddy, Deza Malone. Curtis chose to have the plot of The Mighty Miss Malone serve as an explanation of how Deza's family ended up homeless in Flint, Michigan, right before the events that take place in Bud, Not Buddy.

== Themes ==
The Mighty Miss Malone deals with the themes of homelessness during the Great Depression, racism, friends and familial bonds. These themes work well together especially because that is how they overcame the Great Depression, together. As Deza narrates the book, the reader experiences the themes of hardship, struggle, poverty, fear and disappointment. However, the reader gets to witness the theme of hope as through all of these negatives, Deza and her mother hold onto their hope that the family will get back together. Orlando Marie, a journalist writing for the School Library Journal, explained that, “Period details are skillfully woven into the story with the Joe Louis vs. Max Schmeling fight playing an important role in underscoring the sense of defeat for African Americans as they struggle with the Depression.” Dean Schneider, a critic from the Horn Book Magazine, wrote, “[The Mighty Miss Malone] is an angry novel, unflinching in its portrayal of poverty.” Although Schneider noted that there was “a measure of hope” by the end of the story, Schneider still emphasized that this book still epitomizes the line from poet Robert Burns, ‘the best-laid schemes of mice and men gang aft a-gley.’

== Reception ==
Critical reception for The Mighty Miss Malone was mostly positive, with reviewers praising the book's style and voice. A reviewer from The New Pittsburgh Courier remarked that "there were a few story threads that were a little odd" but they also noted that they enjoyed the book overall and recommended it as a great read for children and book groups. A reviewer for the School Library Journal stated that some expectations for the book might have been a little high, but that they were "completely enthralled by the voice, this wonderful realistic lens through which the reader experiences an African-American family’s plight in The Great Depression". Another comment from School Library Journal was that "some of the mixed reactions to this book have to do with what readers expected of it. Thinking of the book for what it is, and its ideal reader, it offers a wonderfully vivid family portrait in a well-developed historical context." The reviewer was also very "confused by complaints that Deza is a 'passive' protagonist, or that the story focuses on other family members rather than her. Put the title aside for a moment (not that it’s not a consideration, but just humor me): isn’t this a story about the whole Malone family? Told from Deza’s point of view?". A critic from Kirkus Reviews praised Christopher Paul Curtis for his “distinctive style of storytelling that seamlessly presents the hardships and finds the humor in tough circumstances.” Literary scholar Rachelle Kuehl uplifts Curtis's collection of work as quality examples of child-appropriate texts that promote awareness of historical atrocities in a way that students may explore them without being overwhelmed by the powerful themes. On the other hand, some critics thought that the way that Curtis resolved the Malones’ problems was “far-fetched.” Another critique of the book was that there was too much going on at some points. This was a problem because as a result, some important plot points were dropped.
