= God's thumb =

God's thumb may refer to:

- Adansonia, a tree that is known in African folklore as "God's Thumb"
- A fictional rock formation that is part of the plot of the novel Holes, by Louis Sachar
- A Consultant Business in Oregon.
