= Someday Angeline =

1983 children's novel by Louis Sachar

- First edition cover
- Author: Louis Sachar
- Audio read by: Abigail Reno
- Language: English
- Genre: Children's novel
- Publisher: Avon Books
- Publication date: 1983
- Publication place: United States
- Media type: Print (Hardback & Paperback)
- Pages: 154 pp (first edition, paperback)
- ISBN: 0-380-83444-8 (first edition, paperback)
- OCLC: 9153974
- Followed by: Dogs Don't Tell Jokes

Someday Angeline is a children's novel written by American author Louis Sachar. The novel follows a girl named Angeline Persopolis who faces trouble at school because of her intelligence. It was originally released in 1983, but received a reprint in 2005 following Sachar's success with Holes.

The audiobook is narrated by Abigail Reno.

== Plot summary ==
Angeline Persopolis is extremely intelligent. She knew things, especially related to ocean animals and the ocean, "before she was born," with her first word being "octopus". Even though she is only eight, she is sent to the sixth grade. She wants to be a garbage collector like her father, although he wants her to become famous and is afraid of her intelligence at times. At school, she also faces problems like being bullied by the other students and misunderstood by her teacher, Mrs. Hardlick. Her only two friends are a fifth grade teacher, Miss Turbone (also known as Mr. Bone), and class clown Gary "Goon" Boone (who later gets a book to himself).

Mr. Persopolis wants the best for his daughter, and he often pushes her too hard to achieve. When she is elected Secretary of Trash, he becomes angry and orders her to resign. The next day at school, Mrs. Hardlick does not listen to Angeline when she tries to resign, and Angeline is so frustrated that she messes up the classroom, denouncing everything as "Garbage!" Mrs. Hardlick is furious and tells Angeline to come back with a signed note from her father. For the next week, she goes to an aquarium each day, instead of going to school. Her father gets home after she does, so he does not know.

When Miss Turbone finds out about this, she arranges to talk with Mr. Persopolis (it is implied that the two fall in love when they meet). They decide Angeline will be transferred to Miss Turbone's fifth grade class, and that she will return to Mrs. Hardlick's class for a day or two while the transfer is arranged. They also plan to go on a date the next evening.

However, Mrs. Hardlick succeeds in alienating Angeline one more time, and she once more runs away from school, this time to a beach, where she jumps off its pier (the better to see the fish) and nearly drowns. However, she is saved by a fisherman and later gets completely better.

== Sequel ==
A sequel to the book with Gary as the main character, Dogs Don't Tell Jokes, was released in 1991. It has most of the characters from this book in it, although Angeline is now at a different school.
