= Sixth Grade Secrets =

1987 novel by Louis Sachar

- First Edition
- Author: Louis Sachar
- Illustrator: Richard Lauter
- Language: English
- Genre: Children's novel
- Publisher: Scholastic
- Publication date: 1987
- Publication place: United States
- Media type: Print (Paperback)
- Pages: 202 pp
- ISBN: 0-590-40709-0
- OCLC: 51670925

Sixth Grade Secrets is a novel by Louis Sachar that follows sixth-grader Laura Sibbie and her friends as they create a secret club in violation of school rules. Laura aspires to be a leader and learns the three Rs of what leadership can entail – Relationships, Rivalries and Responsibility. In 2009 it was released by Bloomsbury Publishing in the United Kingdom under the title, Pig City.

== Plot summary ==
When Laura Sibbie starts a secret club at school, she makes the other members give her something totally embarrassing as "insurance," to make sure they don't tell anyone else about the club. She promises to keep the insurance secret unless someone tells. Gabriel wants to join, but when Laura asks him, there is a misunderstanding and he storms out to form a rival club, Monkey Town.

The pranks they play on each other escalate into ugly and destructive acts. It gets to a point where Gabriel steals the insurance and reveals it to the school. Sheila (who hates Laura) and a friend, Howard (who just wants everyone to like him), corner Laura on her way from school and cut a large chunk out of her long hair. Laura gets a new, short, curly hairdo which Gabriel, arriving with daisies, likes. The sheared Laura sees how foolish they've been, and the truth of Gabriel's affection comes to light.

== Characters ==
- Laura Sibbie - hero, a fan of George Washington, natural leader, founder of "Pig City", has a clubhouse nicknamed the "Dog House" in her backyard that becomes club headquarters. She matures a lot the last few weeks of sixth grade. Pig City insurance: A love letter to Mr Doyle.
- Allison - co-founder of Pig City, always clean and neat, fond of Aaron. Pig City insurance: photographed naked in a bathtub at age 3.
- Tiffany - co-founder of Pig City, always unkempt, fond of Nathan, first of the trio to be kissed by a boy. Pig City insurance: Prank newspaper article from an uncle that claims she is ticklish and that she is sloppy with spaghetti.
- Gabriel - has copied more dictionary pages than anyone else in class; always in trouble but never tells on anyone; has a crush on Laura, plan to get Laura to tell him about Pig City backfires, forms rival club "Monkey Town." Planned Pig City insurance: to be photographed wearing a dress, then to kiss Laura but was rejected from Pig City after that.
- Kristin - has a small face but wears big glasses that make her look cute and everyone thinks she is studious. Pig City insurance: underpants.
- Debbie - hangs upside down to get the blood flowing to her brain. Pig City insurance: recorded phone call professing love to Howard.
- Nathan - uses amusing speech expressions ("okee-dokee-do!"), first to kiss Tiffany. Pig City insurance: Hate letter to Mr Doyle.
- Aaron - always well dressed because his grandmother picks his clothes, good singing voice. Pig City insurance: recorded singing "I am such a stupid jerk..."
- Karen - easy going very talkative, Yolanda's best friend. Never invited to join Pig City, joins "Monkey Town" instead.
- Yolanda - very pretty but shy, never talks much, fond of Jonathan, Karen's best friend. Only Pig City member to be removed because of breaking the secrecy rule, joins "Monkey Town" then leaves for Jonathan's club "Eagle's Nest" after club splits. Pig City insurance: Love note to Jonathan.
- Jonathan - smart, athletic, handsome, conceited, begins a relationship with Yolanda after discovering the love note. Joins "Monkey Town" but splits with Gabriel after Laura's successful division ploy, forms "Eagle's Nest" with Yolanda. Fond of Yolanda.
- Sheila - has frizzy hair, extremely jealous of Laura and her long hair, motivated by revenge and capable of vicious pranks, joins "Monkey Town." Fond of Howard.
- Howard - seeks friendship by agreeing with everyone, but ends up backstabbing everyone. Kicked out of "Monkey Town" club, rejected by both "Eagle's Nest" and "Pig City" as unworthy. Becomes pawn of Sheila to help with the attack on Laura. Fond of Sheila.
- Linzy - teacher's pet. Never joins a club. Tricks Laura for Mr Doyle into admitting who wrote the messages on the board, but helps complete dictionary pages for them because she feels guilty.
- Mr. Doyle - Laura's sixth-grade teacher, well-respected by most, especially Laura; admonitions to his class usually include the phrase "a word to the wise".
