= Christopher Paul Curtis =

American children's book author (born 1953)

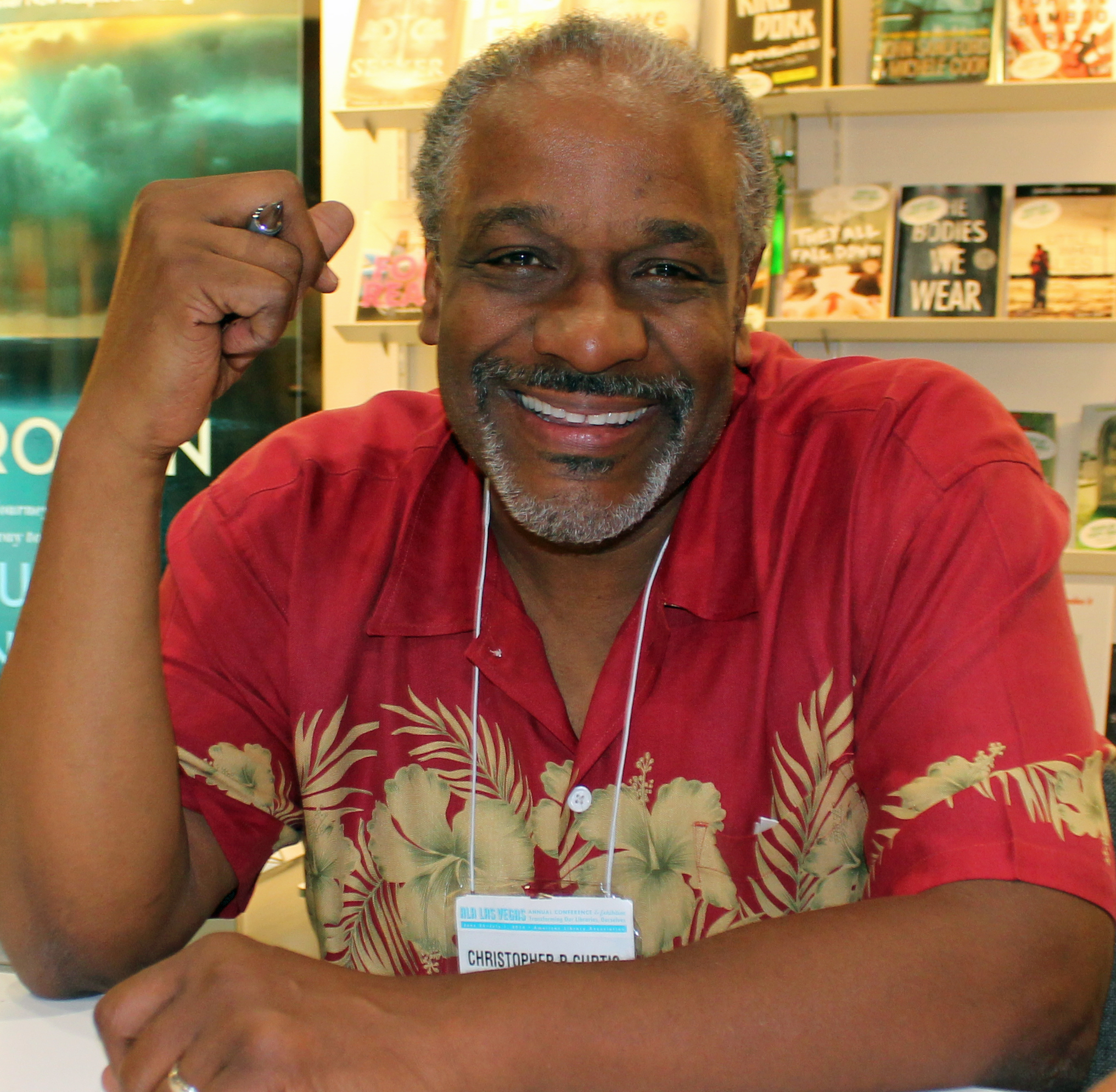
- Curtis in 2014
- Born: May 10, 1953 (age 73); Flint, Michigan, U.S.
- Education: University of Michigan–Flint
- Occupations: Writer, speaker
- Writing career
- Period: 1995–present
- Genres: Children's literature, especially historical fiction
- Notable works: Bud, Not Buddy; The Watsons Go to Birmingham – 1963; Elijah of Buxton; The Mighty Miss Malone
- Notable awards: Newbery Medal; 2000; Coretta Scott King Award; 2000, 2008

Christopher Paul Curtis (born May 10, 1953) is an American children's book author. His first novel, The Watsons Go to Birmingham – 1963, was published in 1995 and brought him immediate national recognition, receiving the Coretta Scott King Honor Book Award and the Newbery Honor Book Award, in addition to numerous other awards. In 2000, he became the first person to win both the Newbery Medal and the Coretta Scott King Award—prizes received for his second novel Bud, Not Buddy—and the first African-American man to win the Newbery Medal. His novel The Watsons Go to Birmingham – 1963 was made into a television film in 2013.

Curtis has written a total of eight novels and has penned introductions to several prominent books in addition to contributing articles to several newspapers and magazines. Schools use his books for literature studies and to teach children about the cruelties of segregation. There are even novel study guides for his books. Following the success of his first two novels, he founded the Nobody but Curtis Foundation in an effort to improve literacy levels amongst children and young adults in North America and Africa.

Born and raised in Flint, Michigan, Curtis worked as an autoworker for General Motors for thirteen years following his high school graduation. During this time, he attended the University of Michigan-Flint as a part-time student, ultimately receiving his degree in 2000. Curtis is praised for his storytelling ability and his use of humor to discuss more serious topics of racism, poverty, and child abuse. His ability to authentically portray the experiences of children and share history in a way that encourages readers to learn more has made him a widely-taught author in elementary and middle schools.

== Early life ==
Christopher Paul Curtis was born in Flint, Michigan, on May 10, 1953, the second child of five children. His father, Dr. Herman (Henry) Elmer Curtis, was a chiropodist who became a factory worker when his patients could no longer pay. Curtis's father was a union activist and the first black production foreman at the Fisher Body Plant. His mother, Leslie Jane Curtis, was a homemaker until her children got older. Then, she became an educator in the Flint Public School System. Curtis attributes his love of books and reading to his mother and considers his parents a significant influence on his life. They were involved in the Civil Rights Movement and brought Curtis and his siblings to several NAACP marches. Curtis recalls picketing places in Flint with his parents that would not serve or hire black people in the early 1960s.

Curtis attended Dewey Elementary, Clark Elementary, Pierce Elementary (in the Academically Gifted Program), Whittier Junior High School, and McKinley Junior High School of the Flint Public School System. In 1967, he was the first African-American student to be elected to the student council in the school's 32-year history. In middle school, Curtis's favorite books were To Kill a Mockingbird by Harper Lee and The Bridges at Toko-Ri by James A. Michener. Curtis also enjoyed reading Mad magazine, Sports Illustrated, Time magazine, and comic books while growing up. His parents valued reading and exposed Curtis and his siblings to a wide variety of books, taking them to the library every Saturday. However, in an interview with the New York Public Library, Curtis stated that, despite reading a lot, he found it difficult to connect to books and stories because they were not by or about black people like himself.

He graduated from Flint Southwestern High School in 1971. The summer after graduating from high school, Curtis became a member of a Lansing-based theatrical/musical group called Suitcase Theater which rehearsed on Tuesdays and Thursdays and performed musical numbers and the works of Langston Hughes. The group performed in the United States, Canada, and Europe.

After graduating high school, Curtis planned to pursue a political science degree at the University of Michigan-Flint. He attended classes full-time for a year but did not do well in his courses. Due to his poor performance in school and the competitive wage being offered at Flint's General Motors Fisher Body Plant No. 1, Curtis chose to work full-time at the factory on September 15, 1972. During this time, he continued taking classes at night as a part-time student. He graduated from the University of Michigan–Flint in 2000. While in college, Curtis took a black literature course that introduced him to authors like Alice Walker, Zora Neale Hurston, and Toni Morrison. Not only did this course foster his love for literature, but it also served as inspiration for details and descriptions in some of his novels.

== Early career ==
Curtis spent 13 years after high school working on the assembly line of Flint's Fisher Body Plant No. 1. His job entailed hanging fifty- to eighty-pound car doors on Buicks for ten hours a day. It was physically demanding as well as monotonous labor. Curtis and his partner at the Plant worked out a deal where, instead of alternating hanging doors, one person would hang every door for thirty minutes while the other took a thirty-minute break. During his thirty-minute breaks, Curtis would block out the noise of the factory and find solace and refuge in reading and writing. Curtis recalls hating working in the factory, despite the steady wages and benefits, and even having nightmares about hanging car doors.

After quitting Fisher Body in 1985, he took a series of low-paying jobs. He worked as a groundskeeper at Stonegate Manor housing cooperative in Flint, served as the Flint campaign co-manager for United States Senator Donald Riegle in 1988, as a customer service representative for MichCon in Detroit, as a temporary worker for Manpower in Detroit, and as a warehouse clerk for Automated Data Processing in Allen Park, Michigan.

== Writing career ==
In 1993, Curtis, convinced by Kaysandra (Kay) Sookram, his wife at the time, took a year off of work to focus on his writing. During this year, Curtis took a writing course at the University of Michigan-Flint and entered several works into a contest for the Hopwood Awards. He received first place for both the novel he submitted, The Watsons Go to Florida, and an essay about his career in the auto factory. Following this win, Curtis submitted his novel to contests sponsored by publishing houses, ultimately resulting in the novel being selected by Delacorte Press for publication. Originally, Curtis intended for the story to center around the Watsons' trip to Florida in 1963, but when his son brought home Dudley Randall's poem "The Ballad of Birmingham," Curtis realized that Birmingham would be a more meaningful destination for the Watsons and changed the ending accordingly. In writing the novel, Curtis was also influenced by other literature and his personal experiences growing up in Flint. In his conversation with interviewer and State University of West Georgia Professor Peter E. Morgan, Curtis notes that he was inspired by Zora Neale Hurston's Their Eyes Were Watching God to personify Death from Kenny's perspective in The Watsons Go to Birmingham – 1963. In this same interview, Curtis describes his decision to leave out Kenny's relation to white people despite his editor wanting to create a book that also appealed to white audiences. Curtis grew up in a self-contained Black neighborhood and recalls his lack of day-to-day interactions with races outside his own, so he felt that Kenny would have a similar experience within his novel.

The novel was eventually published in 1995 as The Watsons Go to Birmingham – 1963. It was named to the American Library Association's list of Best Books for Young Adults and won both the Newbery Honor Book Award and the Coretta Scott King Honor Book Award alongside more than twenty-five other awards and honors. The Watsons sold over three hundred thousand copies and has been translated into eleven different languages. The movie rights to The Watsons were sold to Lancit Media shortly after publication and then bought by Whoopi Goldberg. The book was adapted for a television movie that aired on the Hallmark Channel in 2013.

Curtis's second book, Bud, Not Buddy, published in 1999, won the Newbery Medal and the Coretta Scott King Award in addition to numerous other awards. He based the story on that of his grandfather who, throughout the 1930s, traveled around Michigan with a band called Herman Curtis and the Dusky Devastators of the Depression.

In addition to writing novels, Curtis travels to various schools and communities to share his experience as an author. He has also written articles and reviews for newspapers and magazines across the country. He wrote an introduction for a reissue of Mark Twain's The Prince and the Pauper as well as an introduction for a reissue of Uncle Tom's Cabin.

Curtis also founded the Nobody but Curtis Foundation as a way to connect with young people and improve literacy levels across North America and Africa. He does this by sending educational materials, technology, and other supplies to schools in need, as well as offering scholarships for students.

=== Writing process and style ===
Curtis's writing process involves waking up at 5 a.m. and editing his writing from the previous day in an effort to shape the words into a story. Following the editing, he goes to the library around 8 a.m. to write for the remainder of the morning. He spends his afternoons engaging in hobbies before spending the evenings writing again.

When Curtis first moved to Windsor, Ontario he would write in the children's room of the Windsor Public Library. In an interview with Nancy Johnson and Cyndi Giorgis, Curtis said that he chose to write there because he enjoyed the energy that kids provide and felt that the librarians were particularly wonderful. In fact, despite the library not officially opening until 10 a.m., the librarians allowed Curtis to come in early to write. Curtis eventually moved his writing to the University of Windsor library due to budget cuts at the Windsor Public Library.

Curtis writes all of his stories in longhand and tends to be an unstructured writer, choosing to follow the voices of his characters rather than outline a specific plot. He says that this method allows him to take time with each of his characters and slow down the writing process as a whole. He identifies Toni Morrison as one of his favorite authors because of the beauty of her language and her ability to write about difficult topics in an eloquent and expert manner. He also loves Mark Twain for his ability to create humor that has transcended generations. Curtis incorporates humor in all of his books, particularly as a way to balance the more serious and difficult topics he often writes about. He also seeks to foster intimacy and closeness with the reader by writing in the first person as opposed to the third person. Curtis did not intend to become a children's author and still does not consider himself one—he just writes stories he believes others would enjoy reading.

Curtis enjoys writing historical fiction because it provides a sense of reality and allows him to explore important stories that have not been told or widely taught to young readers. Through this writing, he hopes to help his readers recognize the importance of history and how it affects all people as well as encourage them to learn more about the historical events he includes in his novels. Additionally, many of Curtis's books are set in Flint as he tends to draw from his personal experiences growing up there.

His four rules to becoming a writer are: (1) Write every day, (2) Have fun with your writing, (3) Be patient with your writing, and (4) Ignore all rules.

== Personal life ==
Curtis met his first wife, Kay Sookram, while attending a basketball game in Hamilton, Ontario. Sookram was born and raised in Trinidad, but moved to Ontario to study nursing. While dating, Curtis and Sookram sent letters to each other. This was Sookram's first encounter with Curtis's writing. After getting married, Curtis moved to Windsor, Ontario to live with Kay because she was unable to get a U.S. work visa. They have two children together: Steven Darrell, born in 1978, and Cydney McKenzie, born in 1992.

Curtis and Sookram separated in the late 2000s. A few years later, Curtis married Habon Aden and they have two children together.

In his free time, Curtis enjoys playing basketball and listening to music, primarily jazz and blues. He views both as a good way to release stress. Curtis also enjoys reading, but only when he is not writing; otherwise, he finds his writing becomes significantly affected by the style of the author he is reading. According to an interview with The Washington Post, Curtis enjoys reading on the couch in the early morning.

== Published books ==
- The Watsons Go to Birmingham – 1963 (1995) – When Kenny Watson's older brother, Byron, gets to be too much trouble, the Watsons head from Flint, Michigan, to Birmingham, Alabama, to visit Grandma Sands, the one person who can shape Byron up. But the events that shake Birmingham in the summer of 1963 will change Kenny's life forever. The Watsons Go to Birmingham – 1963 was a runner-up for the Newbery Medal and was selected as a top book of the year by many publications and organizations. In 2013, it was named as one of the New York Public Library's 100 Great Children's Books of the Last 100 Years.
- Bud, Not Buddy (1999) – It is 1936 in Flint, Michigan. Times may be hard, and ten-year-old Bud may be a motherless boy on the run, but he has a few things going for him. Bud goes to find who he believes is his father, a man named Herman E. Calloway. He meets a few friends on the way, and stays determined to achieve his goals. Curtis modeled characters in Bud, Not Buddy after his two grandfathers: Earl "Lefty" Lewis, a Negro league baseball pitcher, and Herman E. Curtis, leader of Herman Curtis and the Dusky Devastators during the Great Depression. Bud, Not Buddy won the 2000 Newbery Medal. It also won the Coretta Scott King Award, and was chosen as the best book of the year by the School Library Journal.
- Bucking the Sarge (2004) – Luther T. Farrell has got to get out of Flint, Michigan. He just needs to escape the evil empire of the local slumlord, "The Sarge", aka his mother. Bucking the Sarge was selected as one of the best children's books of the year by various publications and organizations, including Publishers Weekly.
- Mr. Chickee's Funny Money (2005) – Mr. Chickeesaw, the genial blind man in the neighborhood, gives 9-year-old Steven a mysterious bill with 15 zeros on it and the image of a familiar but startling face. Mr. Chickee's Funny Money was a Parents' Choice Award winner.
- Mr. Chickee's Messy Mission (2007) – When Russell's dog, Rodney Rodent, jumps into a mural to chase a demonic-looking gnome and disappears, the Flint Future Detectives are on the case.
- Elijah of Buxton (2007) – A story based on the historic settlement of North Buxton, Ontario, developed for and by former African-American slaves who escaped to Canada on the Underground Railroad. In Canada they were known as Negro refugees. Elijah of Buxton won the 2008 Coretta Scott King Award and the 2008 Scott O'Dell award for historical fiction for young adult. It was also named Booklist's "Top of the List" winner for "Youth Fiction."
- The Mighty Miss Malone (2012) – This book is set in Depression-era Gary, Indiana, and Flint, Michigan. The work is a spin-off from Bud, Not Buddy.
- The Madman of Piney Woods (October 2014) – This book returns readers to Buxton, Ontario, this time in 1901. It is told in alternating chapters, by two twelve-year-old boys. Alvin "Red" Stockard is an Irish boy living in nearby Chatham, Ontario, and Benjamin "Benji" Alston, is a Black Canadian boy who lives in the settlement of Buxton; he is a descendant of African-American slaves who reached freedom in Canada via the Underground Railroad. Several characters from Elijah of Buxton make brief appearances in this work.
- The Journey of Little Charlie (January 2018) — The third book in Curtis's Buxton Trilogy, this begins on a plantation in South Carolina in 1858, where a 12-year-old boy helps the overseer recapture an escaped slave. He goes to Canada with a party trying to recapture a slave boy, and they are prevented by a resisting group of African Americans in Buxton. It was a finalist for the 2018 National Book Award for Young People's Literature.

Curtis also edited Bites: Scary Stories to Sink Your Teeth Into, a collection of scary children's stories published in 2010 by Scholastic.

== Awards and honors ==
- Coretta Scott King – Virginia Hamilton Award for Lifetime Achievement (2024)

=== Awards for specific works ===
The Watsons Go to Birmingham – 1963

- Coretta Scott King Honor Book
- Newbery Honor Book
- Jane Addams Peace Award Honor Book

Bud, Not Buddy

- Newbery Medal winner
- Coretta Scott King Author Award
- Young Reader's Choice Award
- SCBWI Golden Kite Award winner

Mr. Chickee's Funny Money

- Parent's Choice Gold Award winner

Bucking the Sarge

- SCBWI Golden Kite Award for Fiction Honor Book

Elijah of Buxton

- Newbery Honor Book
- Coretta Scott King Award winner
- Scott O'Dell Award
- Canadian Library Association Book of the Year
