= Elijah of Buxton =

2007 children's novel by Christopher Paul Curtis

- Author: Christopher Paul Curtis
- Language: English
- Genre: Historical fiction
- Published: 2007, Scholastic
- Publication place: United States
- Media type: Print (Hardcover and Paperback)
- Pages: 341
- Awards: 2008 Coretta Scott King Author Award; Newbery Honor
- ISBN: 0-439-02344-0
- OCLC: 86090238
- LC Class: PZ7.C94137 El 2007
- Followed by: The Madman of Piney Woods

Elijah of Buxton is a 2007 children's novel by Christopher Paul Curtis. The book won critical praise and was a Newbery Honor book and the winner of the Coretta Scott King Award. It also was a children's book bestseller.

== Summary ==
Elijah of Buxton is about an eleven-year-old boy, Elijah Freeman, who lives in Buxton, Canada. It was started as the Elgin Settlement, a refugee camp for African-American slaves who escaped via the Underground Railroad to gain freedom in Canada. Elijah is the first free-born child in the settlement, and has never lived under slavery. He has only heard of it. He goes into the United States to help stop a man from his settlement from stealing money from his friend, and learns there that it is a privilege to be free.

== Reception ==
Elijah of Buxton has been well received. School Library Journal called it "an example of everything Curtis does well. His historical research is superior. His characters heartwarming. His prose funny and heart-wrenching in turns." and "A great book and well deserving of any buzz it happens to achieve." Kirkus Reviews gave a starred review, declaring "This is Curtis's best novel yet, and no doubt many readers, young and old, will finish and say, "This is one of the best books I have ever read.""

Publishers Weekly wrote, "The arresting historical setting and physical comedy signal classic Curtis (Bud, Not Buddy), but while Elijah's boyish voice represents the Newbery Medalist at his finest, the story unspools at so leisurely a pace that kids might easily lose interest." and "The powerful ending is violent and unsettling, yet also manages to be uplifting." Common Sense Media awarded it five stars, calling it a "humorous, powerful, masterful escape-slave tale" and asserted "This wonderful, moving novel is sure to become a staple of discussion groups in schools and libraries across the country."

== Awards ==
Awards for Elijah of Buxton
Year	Award	Result	Ref.
2008	Canadian Library Association Book of the Year for Children Award	Winner	
2008	Coretta Scott King Award	Winner	
2008	Newbery Medal	Honor	
2008	Ruth & Sylvia Schwartz Children's Book Award for Young Adult/Middle Grade Novel	Finalist	
2008	Scott O'Dell Award for Historical Fiction	Winner	
