= Bud, Not Buddy =

1999 novel by Christopher Paul Curtis

- Front cover of Bud, Not Buddy.
- Author: Christopher Paul Curtis
- Language: English
- Genre: Children's literature, African-American literature, Historical fiction
- Publisher: Delacorte Press
- Publication date: January 1, 1999
- Publication place: United States
- Media type: Print (hardback & paperback)
- Pages: 245 pages
- Awards: 2000 Coretta Scott King Author Award; Newbery Medal; William Allen White Children's Book Award
- ISBN: 0-385-32306-9
- OCLC: 40744296
- LC Class: PZ7.C94137 Bu 1999

Bud, Not Buddy is the second children's novel written by Christopher Paul Curtis. It was the first book to receive both the Newbery Medal for excellence in American children's literature, and the Coretta Scott King Award, which is given to outstanding African-American authors. Bud, Not Buddy was also recognized with the William Allen White Children's Book Award for grades 6-8.

== Setting and historic significance ==
The novel is set in Michigan, the home state of the author. This is also the setting of his first novel, The Watsons Go to Birmingham. Bud Caldwell, the main character, travels from Flint to Grand Rapids, giving readers a glimpse of the midwestern state in the late 1930s. Bud meets a homeless family and a labor organizer, and experiences life as an orphaned youth and the racism of the time, such as laws that prohibited African Americans from owning land in many areas, the dangers facing black people, and racial segregation.

One element of the historic setting is a Sundown town, where racist covenants prohibit African Americans from living and custom endangers the lives of any found there after dark. Bud meets Lefty, a well-meaning passer-by who becomes a good friend when he cautions Bud to keep him from entering a Sundown.

The effects of The Depression on this area are described throughout the story of Bud's journey across the state. Bud spends an evening in Flint's Hooverville, a hobo encampment, where he comments on the mixture of races; the author points to the police presence and the tension between police and those attempting to hop trains, their poverty and desperate migration characterizing the Great Depression. The uncertainty of the era is reflected in Bud's own life, as his transience and loss of home were experienced by many migrant families and orphaned children.

Jazz music and musicians are a central part of the narrative; the author was inspired to create the story by his own grandfather, who was a jazz musician during The Depression. The band Bud searches for is named for a band that the author's other grandfather played with, called Herman Curtis and the Dusky Devastators of The Depression. Bud connects to his new friends and family through the music, which is a part of his history as an African American and exemplifies the popular music of the era.

== Plot ==
The story opens with Bud being placed with a new foster family, the Amoses. Bud soon meets Todd Amos, their 12-year-old son, who teases him mercilessly and calls him Buddy. After a fight with Todd, Bud is forced to spend the night in the garden shed, where he mistakes a hornet nest for a vampire bat. He slices the nest in half with a rake, upsetting the hornets and getting himself stung. During his adrenaline rush, he breaks through the window of the shed, causing a mess.

After escaping, Bud takes revenge on Todd by making him wet his bed by pouring warm water on Todd, as the Amoses cannot stand bedwetting. He also hides the Amoses’ shotgun and takes leave. He then sleeps under a Christmas tree for the night. The next day, he wakes up to find that he had missed the breakfast line at the mission, but is saved by a couple who pretended he was their son. The next morning, his friend Bugs wakes him up so they can go to the West.

Bud runs away with Bugs to Hooverville where they eat and plan to get on the train leaving West the next day. The train, however, leaves early, and Bud, unlike Bugs, fails to hop on and is left behind. Bud learns about the walking distance from Flint to Grand Rapids, Michigan from a librarian and begins to travel on foot. On the way, he meets Lefty Lewis —- who he thought was a vampire as he had a box of blood in his car —- who gives Bud a ride in his car to Grand Rapids to find his father. He stays with Lefty for a short while and meets his daughter's family. He then leaves to find his father, who he believes is Herman E. Calloway.

Bud meets Herman and his band and declares himself to be Herman's son, though his confidence is shaken when he sees that Herman is elderly. Bud becomes friends with the band members (who give him a saxophone by the end of the book), but Herman treats Bud with great animosity. Bud is soon forced to deliver the news that his mother, Angela Janet, is dead. This brings great grief to Herman, who is revealed to be Angela's estranged father.

The story ends with Herman apologizing to Bud for his animosity and allowing him to stay with him and the band. Despite all of his dilemmas and grief, Bud has a happy ending.

== Reception and analysis ==
Curtis' novel was received well and referenced as a children’s fiction source for learning about the Depression era and Jazz, as well as social issues like violence and racism. Points of discussion have focused on parallels between Bud's journey to find his father, and the common experience of many people during the Great Depression as they had to move around looking for work and new homes. The child narrator and historic context have made Curtis’ book a choice for teachers, the audiobook has also been used as part of teaching curriculums.

The novel was praised for its historical context as well as its humorous narrator. Bud has various rules to live by called, “Bud Caldwell’s Rules and Things for Having a Funner Life and Making a Better Liar Out of Yourself.” Throughout his story, these rules are part of the humor and cleverness expressed by the main character as he encounters different people and situations.

Bud’s innocence as a young narrator is repeatedly cited by reviewers and academics studying how Bud experiences, but does not deeply examine, world issues as a child. His belief in vampires and other supernatural ideas are also used as discussion point by educators. The simple ways Curtis has Bud describe forms of racism are quoted and highlighted. He is mistreated or helped by other characters in the novel; the former actions coming from his foster family and the latter coming from the friends he makes on the road. Bud's insistence on being addressed by his name and not some alternative nickname is also looked at closely when analyzing the impact of the main character and his personal strength. These are all elements that have been analyzed in academic writing, reviewed and used in classrooms for teaching history, and social justice issues.

The jazz music in the novel is also used as a point of entry for connecting to the story and for expanding on the learning experience, by adding an audio element to the novel. This is noted as a way to recommend students who might be music fans to the story. Jazz music is part of the audio book and discussed as a learning tool on educators resource sites; students who might not have heard jazz are introduced through the audio books inclusion of jazz at the end of chapters.

== Stage adaptation ==
Bud, Not Buddy was adapted for the stage by Reginald Andre Jackson for Black History Month, in Fremont, California. The production premiered in 2006 at the Langston Hughes Cultural Arts Center. It has been produced several times, including at the Children's Theatre Company in Minneapolis, Main Street Theatre in Houston, the University of Michigan-Flint and Children's Theatre of Charlotte. Jackson's adaptation was published by Dramatic Publishing in 2009, it won the Distinguished Play Award (Adaptation) from The American Alliance for Theatre and Education in 2010.

In January 2017, an adaptation of the novel premiered at Eisenhower Theater in The Kennedy Center for Performing Arts; it was a blend of jazz concert and theater. The music was composed by Terence Blanchard and the script was written by Kirsten Greenidge. Actors and musicians shared the stage instead of being separated by a stage and orchestra pit. The adaptation added live music written specifically to highlight the jazz world in Michigan where Bud went to find the musician he thought was his father. The score was composed to be played by high school bands in future productions, and it was written to be a challenging score for students.

== Awards ==
Bud, Not Buddy received the 2000 Newbery Medal for excellence in American children's literature, over twenty years after the first African American author had received the honor. Christopher Paul Curtis was also recognized with the 2000 Coretta Scott King Award, an award given to outstanding African-American authors. These national honors were given in addition to fourteen different state awards.

Awards
Preceded by Holes	Newbery Medal recipient 2000	Succeeded by A Year Down Yonder
Preceded by Heaven	Coretta Scott King Author Award; 2000	Succeeded by Miracle's Boys
Preceded by Holes	Winner of the William Allen White Children's Book Award; Grades 6–8; 2002	Succeeded by Dovey Coe

Bud, Not Buddy Awards
1999	Best Book of the Year by School Library Journal
1999	Best Book of the Year by Publishers Weekly Notable
1999	Notable Book of the Year by New York Times
1999	Parents Choice Award
2000	Blackboard Book of the Year
2000	Newbery Medal for the Most Distinguished Contribution to American Literature for Children
2000	Coretta Scott King Award
2000	International Reading Associations Children's and Young Adults Book Awards
2002	William Allen White Children's Book Award (Grades 6-8)
