= There's a Boy in the Girls' Bathroom =

Book by Louis Sachar

- Author: Louis Sachar
- Language: English
- Genre: Children's novel
- Publisher: Yearling
- Publication date: 1987
- Publication place: United States
- Media type: Print (Paperback)
- Pages: 208 pp
- ISBN: 0-394-80572-0
- OCLC: 247557223

There's a Boy in the Girls' Bathroom is a 1987 juvenile fiction book from the author Louis Sachar about a fifth-grade bully named Bradley Chalkers, whose behavior improves after intervention from a school counselor. The title comes from a point when a character, Jeff, is horribly embarrassed after accidentally entering the girls' bathroom while trying to go to the school counselor's office when a teacher gives him the wrong directions.

== Plot ==
Bradley Chalkers is the protagonist of the book. He is the oldest student in the fifth-grade class, having repeated fourth grade. In his school, he sits at the back of the class, last seat, last row, and never pays any attention, preferring to scribble, cut up pieces of paper, or partake in other mindless tasks which keep his mind off the lesson. He is proud whenever he receives an F on his class tests. He wants everyone to hate him because he believes that they will then leave him alone. Everyone hates him, including the teachers.

A new classmate, Jeff Fishkin, comes in from Washington, D.C., and the only two remaining seats are the ones beside and in front of Bradley. Jeff tries to reason with Bradley, but fails, like everyone else. Then, a counselor named Carla is appointed, and she can't wait to meet Bradley. Carla says she wants to be friends with Bradley, and she begins to try to open him up and reveal his kind interior, which he has been trying to hide. Bradley refuses to come quietly, and his conflicting emotions with Carla and other people induce strife among his fellow schoolmates. As he meets with Carla more and more, he slowly decides to become a better person. He does his homework and forms better relationships with his parents. To help him with a book report, Carla lends him her favorite book, My Parents Didn't Steal an Elephant. Bradley thinks that the book is good luck and responsible for his changes.

A subplot of the book involves Jeff and a girl named Colleen Verigold (described as having "red hair and a freckled face"), who seem to have crushes on each other. Bradley thinks girls are gross and especially hates Colleen's best friend, the outspoken Lori. At the beginning of the book, Bradley becomes irritated with Jeff for saying "Hi" to Colleen whenever she says "Hi" to him. Later, Carla tells Jeff and Colleen that Zen Buddhist monks are required to say "Hi" to each other when they meet (as stated in J. D. Salinger's book Raise High the Roof Beam, Carpenters and Seymour: An Introduction). Later in the book, Bradley proves his friendship to Jeff by saying "Hi" to him. Towards the end of the book, as Carla helps Bradley change, he is invited to Colleen's birthday party, along with Jeff, and he even wins the party games, getting a harmonica as a prize. He also gets respect from all of the other girls.

Unfortunately, Carla is not as popular with many parents of the students. Colleen's mother becomes angry with her for supposedly preaching religion (telling Jeff and Colleen about the Zen Buddhist monks) and counseling Colleen without permission. As a result, Carla is transferred and becomes a kindergarten teacher. When he hears this, Bradley becomes very upset and threatens to revert to his original behavior. Although he misses saying goodbye to Carla, he does return to the school and finds a package she leaves for him. The package contains a goodbye note from her and her book. In the end, Bradley starts to come to terms with Carla's departure. He writes her a goodbye letter of his own and sends his most prized possession with it, a small china rabbit named Ronnie.

== Characters ==
- Bradley Chalkers – Considered the meanest kid in school; however, after he meets Carla, he realizes that if he believes the people who call him a "monster", then that is what he will become. He must believe in himself. A common trait of Bradley is that he can never smile properly, as no one can tell if it is a smile or a frown.
- Carla Davis – The school counselor. Unlike the teachers at the school, she prefers to persuade students to do the right thing instead of outright telling them what to do. Although students like Jeff, Bradley, and Colleen like her, she is very unpopular among the parents, who believe that a counselor is unnecessary. She is the reason for Bradley's turnaround. She believes in him and gives him confidence.
- Jeff Fishkin – Colleen's crush and the new kid. Has a habit of automatically saying "hello" or "hi" to people when they greet him. He becomes Bradley's only friend, only because he was paid a dollar. Later, he ditches him for cooler friends. After Bradley starts acting nicer, he and Jeff become friends again. He and Colleen become closer at the end. Jeff is also well known for accidentally walking into the girls' bathroom, hence the title of the book.
- Colleen Verigold – Jeff's crush. She has a birthday party at the end of the story and invites all her friends, as well as Jeff and Bradley. She was initially reluctant to invite Bradley until she discovered how much he had changed for the better.
- Melinda Birch – Colleen's tough best friend. She fights with Bradley frequently, although she likes him better by the end of the book.
- Lori Westin – the biggest gossip in school. She is nicknamed "Lori Loudmouth" by Bradley because of how she gets on his nerves.
- Mrs. Chalkers – Bradley's mother. She cares about him and too often babies him. She tries to help him out, despite his behavior.
- Mr. Chalkers – Bradley's father. He works at the police department, but has been demoted to desk work after he was shot in the leg by a robber. Although he and Bradley fight at the beginning of the book, they become closer by the end because he helps Bradley with his homework. Although he originally doesn't like the school having a counselor, he changes his mind when he sees how much she helps Bradley.
- Claudia Chalkers – Bradley's older sister. She usually teases him and is mean. She is occasionally nice, however, such as when she buys him a small china bear after she accidentally breaks his miniature rabbit, or when she helps him with his math homework.
- Ronnie – Bradley's favorite toy animal, a china rabbit. She is very real in his imagination, as a funny, happy-go-lucky rabbit that's also in love with Bartholomew. She has a broken ear given to her by Claudia. She is given to Carla at the end of the book as a gift from the heart. She can be seen as a personification of the friendship Bradley wants, as he imagines her speaking to him in the same way Carla does. In the middle of the book, Ronnie drowns in quicksand when Bradley becomes angry with Carla for leaving the school. Ronnie is later alive and well, and Bartholomew makes up with her after Bradley comes to terms with Carla leaving.
- Bartholomew – Bradley's china bear that Claudia bought for him after she broke Ronnie's ear. In Bradley's stories, he's usually the hero and is in love with Ronnie. He's also responsible for the brief death of Ronnie by not saving Ronnie from quicksand, which caused her to temporarily drown. He can be seen as a personification of who Bradley wants to be (a hero with many friends and someone who loves him).
- Mrs. Ebbel – Bradley's teacher. She teaches her class in Room 12. She has very little faith in Bradley's success and expresses her concern to Bradley's mother.
- Judy and Betty – Two of the guests at Colleen's party who are best friends.
- Amie and Dena – Two of the guests at Colleen's party who always do everything together and wear matching clothes.
- Karen – One of the guests at Colleen's party who is shy and more mature than the others.
- Robbie, Russell, Dan, and Brian – Four boys in Jeff and Bradley's class who are friends with Jeff.
- Andy, Curtis, and Doug – Three boys who are friends with Jeff who aren't in his class.
- Shawne – the girl who sits in front of Jeff in class.
- Mrs Wilcott – the school librarian
- Mrs Kemp – the school janitor
- Mrs Verigold – Colleen's mother
- The president of the school board – he attends a meeting with Carla Davis and the Concerned Parents Organization.

Bradley also has a collection of animals stored in his mind with different personalities. They include a brass lion he found in the garbage, an ivory donkey which his parents brought back from Mexico, two owls that were once used as salt and pepper shakers, a glass unicorn with broken horn and a family of cocker spaniels on an ashtray. They also include a kangaroo, a fox, a raccoon, an elephant, a wooden hippopotamus, and others. In his mind, they speak and identify him as their hero and best friend.

Awards
Preceded by Sixth-Grade Sleepover	Mark Twain Award; 1990	Succeeded by All About Sam
