= Fuzzy Mud =

Children's book

- First edition
- Author: Louis Sachar
- Language: English
- Genre: Adventure
- Publisher: Delacorte Books for Crime Readers, Random House
- Publication date: August 4, 2015
- Media type: trade hardcover
- Pages: 181
- ISBN: 978-0385743785
- OCLC: 1054992333
- Dewey Decimal: [Fic] - dc23
- LC Class: PZ7.S1185 Fu 2015

Fuzzy Mud is a 2015 novel written by children's author Louis Sachar. Originally written in English, it was translated to French by Jean-François Ménard, under the title Chemins toxiques ("Toxic Paths").

== Plot ==
Fifth grader Tamaya Dhilwaddi and seventh grader Marshall Walsh have been walking to and from school together for years. However, their routine is interrupted when Chad Hilligas, a bully Marshall knows, threatens to attack them on their commute. To avoid Chad, Marshall and Tamaya take a shortcut home through the off-limits woods. Marshall and Tamaya get lost, then Chad shows up and tries to attack Tamaya. Marshall tries to defend her, but gets caught by Chad in the process. To save Marshall, Tamaya grabs nearby mud and throws it in Chad's face.

Meanwhile, excerpts from an investigation led by the Energy and Environment Commission of the American Senate are shown, on the topic of SunRay Farm and biolene, an environmentally-friendly alternative to petroleum, developed by Jonathan Fitzman and Dr. Mark Humbard, among others.

The following day, Tamaya wakes up to discover she's developed a rash from exposure to the mud. At school, the principal announces the disappearance of Chad Hilligas, from which Tamaya quickly concludes that he must still be in the woods. She and Marshall both independently decide to remain silent on the subject, in order to keep each other out of trouble.

The next day, Tamaya's rash gets worse, so she is taken to the nurse's office. During her stay there, Tamaya realizes what happened to her hand should logically happen to Chad's face. She sneaks out of from school during lunch break and goes into the woods, where she eventually finds Chad. Upon finding him, she finds out that the mud had rendered him almost completely blind. The two children then have a deep discussion, which reveals why Chad acts mean to others.

When Marshall learns that Tamaya is missing, he also leaves to look for her in the woods. He finds Tamaya and Chad, who have become closer, and helps the two leave the woods. He almost immediately notices that he too has begun developing the rash. A search and rescue team finds the trio, exhausted, and takes them to a hospital.

More excerpts from the senate investigation reveal that the mystery mud is in fact the result of an unforeseen mutation of the microorganisms that biolene is composed of. Seeing the effects it can have on humans, Heath Cliff (the town where all this takes place) is put under quarantine, in order to keep the condition from spreading.

Eventually, as the mutation does not allow the microorganisms to survive in freezing temperatures, all the creatures die. As for the humans and animals already affected, a scientist by the name of Dr. Crumbly discovers a cure after finding that his pet turtle, despite exposure to the mud, does not develop symptoms. Using this, he develops a vaccine composed of turtle enzymes, which proves effective and is given to more than sixty thousand humans and animals.

The world continues using biolene, manufactured only in the states of New Mexico, Idaho, and Michigan, all of which have harsh winters and lack of vegetation. The entire globe is grateful to Tamaya, to the extent that the rash is named the Dhilwaddi Blister rash.

== Reception ==
Darienne Stewart from Common Sense Media rated the book four out of five stars. She praised the book's characters as role models, but criticized it for what she thinks is a rushed ending. On BookTrust's "17 books to make reading fun for your class" list, Fuzzy Mud was in seventh place. Fuzzy Mud appeared on Theschoolrun.com's "Best books for ten year olds". It was described as "intelligent, thought provoking and thrilling." Marybeth Kozikowski from the School Library Journal describes the book as an exciting tale that blends horror with sober consideration of ethics and science. Kirkus Reviews describes the book as "a quick meditation on the promise and dangers of modern science that came from an exciting story from school life, friends, and bullies."
