= The Boy Who Lost His Face =

1989 novel by Louis Sachar

- First edition
- Author: Louis Sachar
- Language: English
- Genre: Children's novel
- Publisher: Alfred A. Knopf
- Publication date: 1989
- Publication place: United States
- Media type: Print (paperback)
- Pages: 198 pp
- ISBN: 0-679-88622-2
- OCLC: 36771926
- LC Class: MLCS 2006/41804 (P)

The Boy Who Lost His Face (ISBN 0-679-88622-2) is a novel by Louis Sachar, published in 1989 by Alfred A. Knopf. The story focuses on a group of young boys. One of them (David), joining in with the 'cool crew', helps to steal an old woman's cane. When she finds them, she cries out, "Your Doppelgänger will regurgitate on your soul!" meaning that his ghostly double would puke on his soul, according to a translation by David. Following this, the protagonist finds himself repeatedly experiencing the same misfortunes he passed on to the old woman.

Themes of the occult, youthful sexuality, and schoolyard bullying and profanity are explored in the novel, and its resulting suppression has garnered its position 49 on the American Library Association's list of the 100 Most Frequently Challenged Books of 1990-2000 and the 92nd position for 2000 to 2009.

== Plot ==
In a 1989 suburban town, a boy named David tries to get in the cool group by helping his friend Scott, and two troublemakers named Roger and Randy (the former being the leader) carry out a prank. Their target is an elderly woman who was called a witch by all the kids in the school. When they attack her and steal her cane David flips her off to try to impress Roger. But when they leave the old lady's house, she cries out to David "Your Doppelgänger will regurgitate on your soul!" The following days David finds himself experiencing strange happenings that lead him to believe that he is cursed. After being rejected by Roger and his gang, David finds himself becoming a loser. He breaks his parents' window, he walks into class with his zipper unzipped, he falls off his chair in class, and his only friends are fellow outcasts Larry and Maureen "Mo". His actions lead Roger's gang to target him and his friends, calling them "The Three Stooges". He becomes friendly with a cute girl named Tori Williams, but his pants fall down when he gets the courage to ask her for her phone number. Finally, his younger brother Ricky, after being ridiculed by Roger's younger brother, loses all respect for David.

Eventually, David begs the elderly woman to remove the curse, but she asks for her cane to be returned first. As it turns out, Tori doesn't scorn David for his humiliation in having his pants fall down in front of her, and tries to pretend that she had her eyes closed in thought when it happened, to prevent David from becoming uncomfortable around her. David finally decides to fight for his dignity, and, with his friends and little brother by his side, he goes to face Roger's gang and get the cane back, not suspecting that many things, including the curse, are not as they seem. Mo, Tori, Larry, David and his little brother all go to Roger's house for the fight. They get the cane and bring it back to the 'witch' who turns out to be Tori's great-aunt. The aunt is not a witch and there was no curse but David was feeling so bad that sub-consciously he does the things to himself that had happened to the old lady. At the end of the book, 150 years later, a boy named Willy, who is similarly bullied, idolizes David, who is now a famous historical figure.
