= Dogs Don't Tell Jokes =

1991 novel by Louis Sachar

- First edition
- Author: Louis Sachar
- Language: English
- Genre: Children's novel
- Publisher: Knopf
- Publication date: 1991
- Publication place: United States
- Media type: Print (Paperback)
- Pages: 240
- Preceded by: Someday Angeline

Dogs Don't Tell Jokes (ISBN 0679833722) is a novel by children's book author Louis Sachar. It is the sequel to Someday Angeline.

== Plot summary ==
Gary Boone (who calls himself "Goon") is the self-proclaimed clown of his seventh-grade class. He never stops joking, despite the fact that nobody laughs much, and he has no real friends at school. Entering a talent contest as a stand-up comedian forces him to look more closely at the effect his humor has on others and on himself. His old friends support him and help him with his routine. Throughout the book, he is deciding whether or not he should compete. At one point, he even quits but then, rejoins. Later, Gary becomes upset with his image and tries to change himself. His best friend Joe, a popular kid in his class, spends time playing football with him. He also starts to collect baseball cards. He tells his parents about this and instead of telling him to be himself, like he expected, they encourage the change and offer him $100 if he doesn't tell a joke for three weeks, which is the night of the talent show.

Gary is a nervous wreck on the night of the talent competition. He is not in the program because he quit (then rejoined). His friend, Joe, makes sure he can compete. But he is placed last. When it is Gary's turn, he wets his pants, then rejoins, due to his nervousness and excitement. He makes a mistake during the beginning, and soon he forgets his routine. Luckily, two kids who have picked on Gary (referred to as his "fan club"), come and spray water and throw pies at him. This allows Gary to start over, not to mention earning a few laughs. His comic routine runs smoothly and he manages to surprise the audience by showing them his newly shaved head. Gary wins the first prize of $100 and the respect of his classmates. Going back to the stage to get his props, he sits alone on a bench behind the curtain and cries for fifteen minutes.
