= Marvin Redpost =

Children's book series by Louis Sachar

The Marvin Redpost series is a series of eight children's books by the author Louis Sachar. The books first came out in 1992, when Sachar's daughter was four years old, which is why Marvin Redpost has a four-year-old sister. The books were re-released in early 2007 with a new cover and different illustrations.

== Books ==
1. Marvin Redpost: Kidnapped at Birth
2. Marvin Redpost: Why Pick on Me?
3. Marvin Redpost: Is He a Girl?
4. Marvin Redpost: Alone in His Teacher's House
5. Marvin Redpost: Class President
6. Marvin Redpost: A Flying, Birthday Cake?
7. Marvin Redpost: Super Fast, Out of Control!
8. Marvin Redpost: A Magic Crystal?

== Characters ==
Marvin Redpost: A young boy and the eponymous character of the series. Marvin has red hair and freckles. He gets into adventures which ends up as bad to good. He lives in a family of five and often hits the 'red post' on his gate when he leaves or comes back home.

Nick Tuffle: One of Marvin's best friends and classmates. Nick has long hair and wears a long shirt. He gets into fights with his other friend, Stuart, another friend of Marvin's, resulting in a love-hate relationship. Regardless, he is loyal and funny.

Stuart Albright: Another classmate of Marvin and one of his best friends. Stuart has curly hair and glasses. He also wears smart clothing, implying that he is the smartest out of the trio. He often gets into fights with Nick, with either one or the other likely to start it, and Marvin is likely to break it up.

Casey Happleton: A classmate of Marvin. Casey is a girl who acts like a tomboy and can be mischievous, especially in class. She is more open to Marvin, besides the other boys in and out of school, which leads Marvin to be mocked as Casey being his 'girlfriend'. She has blonde hair, with one ponytail sticking out of the side rather than the back, which has some boys to find her 'weird'.

Mrs. North: Marvin's school teacher. She is kind-hearted to the class. She leaves Marvin to take care of her dog when she goes on vacation, which shows she has more trust on him than other students.

Clarence: A classmate of Marvin, and the school bully. Marvin becomes a victim when he claims Marvin was picking his nose in the book 'Why Pick on Me?', leaving Marvin in torment.
