= The Watsons Go to Birmingham – 1963 =

1995 historical novel by Christopher Paul Curtis

The Watsons Go to Birmingham — 1963
- Author: Christopher Paul Curtis
- Genre: Realistic fiction, Juvenile fiction, Historical fiction
- Publication date: 1995/1997/2000/2020
- Publication place: United States
- ISBN: 978-0385382946
- OCLC: 32133739
- LC Class: PZ7.C94137 Wat 1995

The Watsons Go to Birmingham – 1963 is a historical-fiction novel by Christopher Paul Curtis. First published in 1995 by Delacorte Press, it was reprinted in 1997. It tells the story of the Watsons, a lower middle class African-American family living in Flint, Michigan in the early 1960s from the perspective of Kenny Watson, the middle child of three. The first part of the novel focuses on Kenny's struggles to make friends as a smart and thoughtful ten-year-old, then shifts in setting when his parents decide to deliver their oldest son, Byron, to live with his grandmother in Birmingham, Alabama. The family embarks on a road trip to the Deep South, and while visiting Alabama, they get caught up in a tragic historical event of the Civil Rights Movement.

The Watsons Go to Birmingham – 1963 communicates the realities of racial injustice to both adult and youth audiences. It has received many prestigious awards and honors for its themes of familial love and historical racism. The book was also adapted into a film for The Hallmark Channel in 2013.

== Background ==
The Watsons Go to Birmingham – 1963 was Christopher Paul Curtis' first novel. He originally planned for the Watson family to travel to Florida rather than Birmingham. In an interview, Curtis stated that his son read him Dudley Randall's "The Ballad of Birmingham" while he was working on the book, and the poem inspired him to change the setting of his novel to focus on a pivotal moment of civil rights history instead.

While the Watson family is fictional, characters and events in the novel are based on Curtis' childhood in Flint. Like the narrator of the story, Curtis was also ten years old in 1963, and he remembers his parents’ involvement in civil rights demonstrations during that time.

== Plot ==
The novel is a first-person account narrated by Kenneth Watson, who lives in Flint, Michigan with his parents Daniel and Wilona Watson; his older brother Byron (By for short), and younger sister Joetta. Kenny is a bright and shy fourth grader at Clark Elementary School who is bullied for his love for reading and his lazy eye. He struggles to make friends until Rufus Fry and his younger brother moves to town from Arkansas. Rufus is also bullied by the other students for his "country" clothes and accent, which initially makes Kenny reluctant to befriend him - especially after the Fry's claim that they would use a .22 caliber to shoot squirrels and cook them into stew - but they are soon inseparable.

The boys are both bullied and protected by Kenny's 13-year-old brother Byron and Byron's friend Buphead. Byron has been retained twice because he often skips school and is, therefore, still in sixth grade. A narcissistic boy, he invents a series of "fantastic adventures" that constantly get him into trouble, such as kissing his reflection in the car window while ploughing snow and getting stuck to it, playing with matches in the house and setting things on fire, abusing his parents' credit at the grocery store to buy himself treats, and getting a conk hairstyle against his parents' orders. However, he also shows elements of compassion, such as after accidentally bludgeoning a pigeon to death with a rock, which leads him to get nauseous, and later buries the pigeon. While Kenny generally reacts to Byron's antics with bafflement, Joetta admires Byron.

Daniel and Wilona eventually become so frustrated with Byron's behavior issues that they decide to deliver him to Birmingham, Alabama to live with Wilona's mother, Grandma Gloria Sands, for at least the summer and possibly an entire year. As soon as the school year concludes, the Watsons ready their car ("the Brown Bomber") and embark on a road trip from Flint to Birmingham to deliver Byron and visit Grandma Sands. Kenny, who had been looking forward to the "battle royal" between his grandmother and Byron, is disappointed when just a few sharp words from Grandma Sands have Byron speaking respectfully and generally behaving himself, and he soon resolves to seek out his own "adventures."

Grandma Sands warns the children to avoid a local swimming hole because of a dangerous whirlpool, which Kenny mishears as "Wool Pooh" due to her thick Alabama accent. Byron capitalizes on this and tells Kenny and Joetta that the Wool Pooh is "Winnie the Pooh's evil twin". Kenny wants to swim there anyway and is frustrated when Byron and Joetta refuse to go along. Ignoring the warnings of both Grandma Sands and Byron, Kenny wades into the seemingly tranquil water and tries to catch a turtle, but is pulled under by the whirlpool. Remembering his grandmother's words, Kenny imagines that the Wool Pooh has grabbed his ankle and is trying to drown him. He struggles to reach the surface three times but is yanked down in each instance. He loses hope until he sees a vision of his little sister dressed as an angel, pointing upward. Kenny kicks towards the surface again as Byron arrives and jumps in to save him. They agree not to tell anyone about the incident, and though Kenny believes he had really seen the Wool Pooh and an angel during his ordeal, Byron insists that there was nothing else in the water.

Shortly afterwards, a bomb explodes at a nearby church where Joetta is attending Sunday school. After his panicked parents and Byron rush to the scene, Kenny wanders over to the smoldering church building in a daze and is convinced that he sees the Wool Pooh again, lurking in the smoke and clinging to what he thinks is Joetta's torn shoe. He takes the shoe and walks back to Grandma Sands' house in shock before anyone notices him at the church. When he arrives, Kenny is confused to find Joetta there alone and assumes that she must be an angel again. Joetta is disturbed by her brother's behavior and claims that she saw him calling and waving to her across the street from the church, but took off running when she approached, leading her back to the house. She also notes that the clothes he was wearing then were different than the ones he currently has on. Kenny eventually realizes that his sister is fine and has no idea that a bomb went off at the church just after she left, before leaving to inform his family who are still at the church.

The Watsons return to Flint. Kenny is unable to process the events in Birmingham and avoids his family and friends over the ensuing weeks, instead spending many hours hiding behind the sofa. Byron eventually coaxes him out into the restroom and gets Kenny to talk about what happened, which finally brings a flood of tears from Kenny. Encouraging his younger brother that the stories are not real and to "keep on stepping," Byron explains that although the world is not perfect, he has to keep moving on.

== Genre ==
Professor Rachelle Kuehl posits that The Watsons Go to Birmingham – 1963 expands beyond the typical historical fiction genre by contextualizing the events of the 16th Street Baptist Church bombing and providing readers the opportunity to learn about social injustice.

== Analysis ==
=== Setting ===
The events of the book occur in the year 1963 from January to October, which can be considered to be a very turbulent time in history as this was the peak of the Civil Rights Movement. The climax of the story centers around the historic 16th Street Baptist Church bombing in Birmingham in 1963, soon after the civil rights protests had resulted in successful negotiations with white city leaders for integration. Ku Klux Klan members bombed the church on September 15, 1963, killing four girls and injuring many more. In the novel, the incident occurs a bit earlier than the historical date to allow the Watson family to be on summer vacation in Birmingham when it takes place.

=== Racial injustice ===
Professor Jonda C. McNair asserts that humor serves as an important literary device in The Watsons Go to Birmingham—1963 to expose the racism experienced by African Americans in the 1960s. More specifically, she finds that the novel uses four categories of race-related humor to reveal racial oppression in a subtle manner: exaggeration, sarcasm, the anticipation of racism, and mocking white people. For example, Daniel jokes about how the Watson family cannot just stop at any establishment during its road trip to Birmingham; these comments, though communicated in a humorous manner, point to the discrimination faced by African Americans in the South.

Professor Jani L. Barker argues that the narrative techniques in The Watsons Go to Birmingham—1963, specifically the first-person narration from Kenny, allow the novel to truthfully communicate the harsh realities of race-based violence without traumatizing its young, vulnerable audience. Since Kenny offers the innocent perspective of a child, younger readers can identify with Kenny and learn about racism from a protective distance that still offers them hope for the future.

Professor Barker also points to the story arc of the novel as an essential element in indirectly combatting racist mindsets. The early chapters of the story depict the everyday life of the Watson family and, thus, allow readers — both Black and non-Black — to recognize the Watson family’s humanity and identify with the protagonists. Race slowly becomes more central as the story progresses until it reaches the climax of race-based violence with the church bombing. This progression fosters a sense of resilience in Black readers as well as empathy for the struggles of Black Americans in non-Black readers.

== Reception ==
The Watsons Go to Birmingham – 1963 was generally well received after its publication. In The Washington Post, Jabari Asim described the novel as “lyrical, engrossing and of sufficient emotive power to sustain the attention of adult readers as well.” In The Guardian, Lindsey Fraser praised the book for tackling “‘big issues’ but [relating] them to a value system, if not an environment, which is readily accessible.”

The book has also been named to the American Library Association’s list of Best Books for Young Adults. It has received over 25 awards and honors, including the Newbery Honor and the Coretta Scott King Honor.

== Adaptations ==
A television film based on the book, produced by Walden Media, premiered on the Hallmark Channel in 2013. It was directed by Kenny Leon and starred Anika Noni Rose, Wood Harris, Latanya Richardson, Skai Jackson, and David Alan Grier. The movie condensed events and characters in Flint from the first half of the novel and added new scenes of Kenny and Byron helping local youths organize civil rights events in Birmingham. Walden Media also collaborated with the Southern Poverty Law Center to develop educational materials that would help teachers in Alabama teach their students about the Civil Rights Movement through the film.

The novel was also adapted into a play by Reginald André Jackson, and is available from Dramatic Publishings.
