= Louis Sachar =

American writer (born 1954)

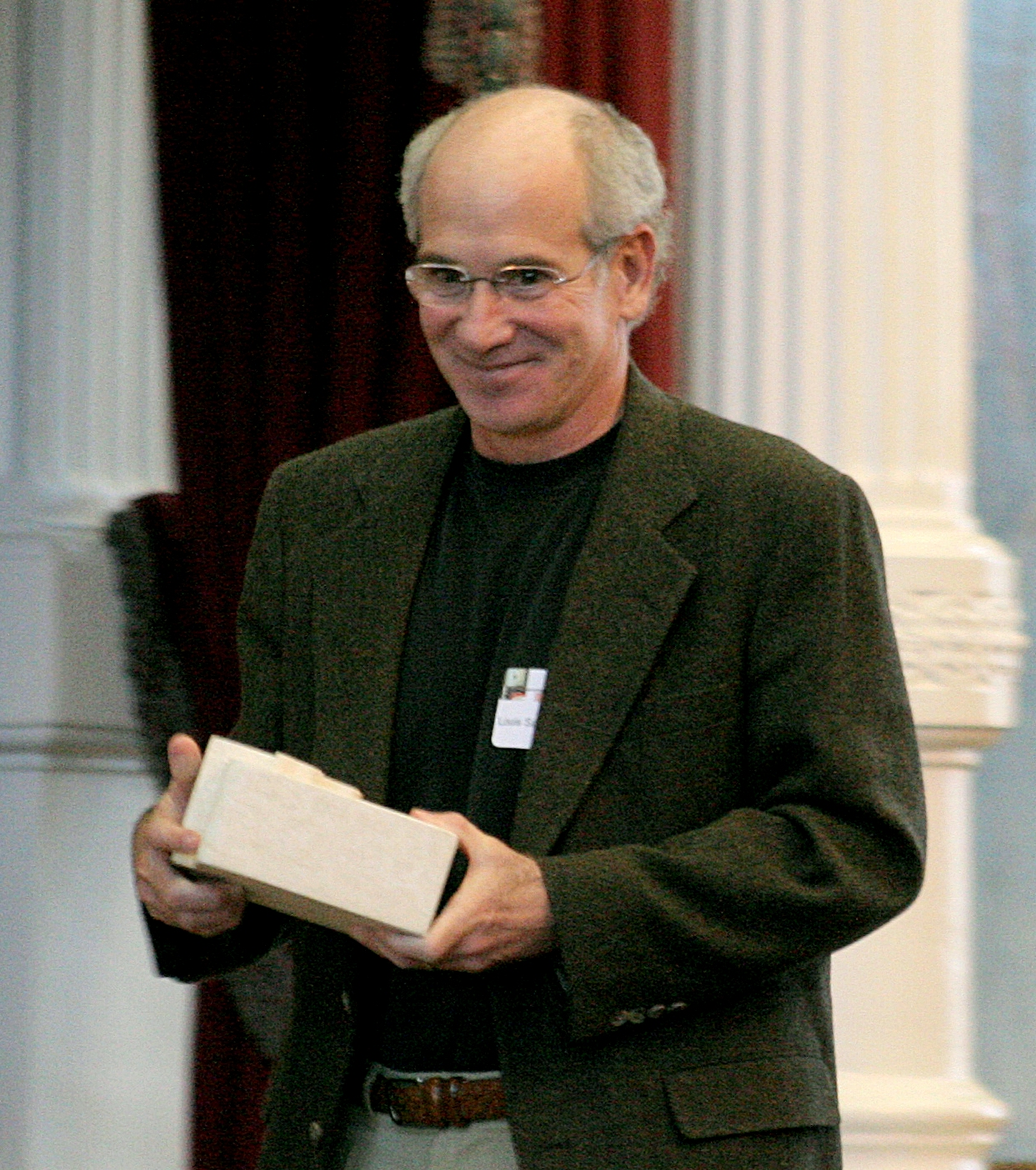
- Sachar in 2006
- Born: March 20, 1954 (age 72); East Meadow, New York, U.S.
- Education: Antioch College; University of California, Berkeley (BA); University of California, Hastings (JD)
- Spouse: Carla Askew (m. 1985)
- Children: 1
- Writing career
- Genre: Children's fiction
- Notable works: Holes; Johnny's in the Basement; Stanley Yelnats' Survival Guide to Camp Green Lake; Small Steps; Wayside School series
- Website: Official website

Louis Sachar (/ˈsækər/ SAK-ər; born March 20, 1954) is an American author. He is best known for the Wayside School series and the novel Holes.

Holes won the 1998 U.S. National Book Award for Young People's Literature and the 1999 Newbery Medal for the year's "most distinguished contribution to American literature for children". In 2013, it was ranked sixth among all children's novels in a survey published by School Library Journal.

== Early life, family and education ==
Sachar was born on March 20, 1954, at Meadowbrook Hospital in East Meadow, New York, to a religious Jewish family. As a child, he attended Hebrew school and Sunday school.

After graduating from Tustin High School, Sachar attended Antioch College for a semester before transferring to University of California, Berkeley, during which time he began helping at an elementary school in return for three college credits. Sachar later recalled,

I thought it over and decided it was a pretty good deal. College credits, no homework, no term papers, no tests, all I had to do was help out in a second/third grade class at Hillside Elementary School. Besides helping out in a classroom, I also became the Noontime Supervisor, or "Louis the Yard Teacher" as I was known to the kids. It became my favorite college class, and a life changing experience.

Sachar graduated from UC Berkeley in 1976 with a degree in economics. He graduated from University of California, Hastings College of the Law in 1980.

== Career ==
After graduation, Sachar worked on Sideways Stories From Wayside School, a children's book set at an elementary school with supernatural elements. Although the book's students were named after children from Hillside and there is a presumably autobiographical character named "Louis the Yard Teacher," Sachar has said that he draws very little from personal experience, stating that "my personal experiences are kind of boring. I have to make up what I put in my books."

Sachar wrote the book at night over the course of nine months, during which he worked during the day in a Connecticut sweater warehouse. After being fired from the warehouse, Sachar decided to go to law school, around which time Sideways Stories From Wayside School was accepted for publication. The book was released in 1978; though it was not widely distributed and subsequently did not sell very well, Sachar began to accumulate a fan base among young readers.

After Sachar graduated from law school in 1980, he performed legal work part-time while continuing to write children's books. By 1989, his books were selling well enough that Sachar was able to begin writing full-time.

== Personal life ==
Sachar married Carla Askew, an elementary school counselor, in 1985. They have a daughter. Sachar has mentioned both his wife and daughter in his books; Carla was the inspiration for the counselor in There's a Boy in the Girls' Bathroom (1988) and for Stanley's lawyer in Holes.

In 2015, when asked whether he thought children had changed over the years, Sachar responded: "I've actually been writing since 1976, and my first book is still in print and doing very well. So, no, I don't think kids have changed."

== Film and television ==
On April 11, 2003, Disney's film adaptation of Holes was released, which earned $71.4 million worldwide. Sachar himself wrote the screenplay, at the request of the film's director Andrew Davis, and has a brief on-screen cameo during one of the flashback scenes. On November 19, 2005, the Wayside School series was adapted into an animated direct-to-video special. Two years later, it became a television series with two seasons, airing on the Canadian Teletoon and Nickelodeon in the U.S.

== Works ==
Wayside School

- Sideways Stories from Wayside School (1978)
- Wayside School is Falling Down (1989)
- Sideways Arithmetic From Wayside School (1989)
- More Sideways Arithmetic From Wayside School (1994)
- Wayside School Gets A Little Stranger (1995)
- Wayside School Beneath the Cloud of Doom (2020)

Marvin Redpost

- Kidnapped at Birth? (1992)
- Why Pick on Me? (1993)
- Is He a Girl? (1993)
- Alone In His Teacher's House (1994)
- Class President (1999)
- A Flying Birthday Cake? (1999)
- Super Fast Out of Control! (2000)
- A Magic Crystal? (2000)

Holes series

- Holes (1998) — winner of the National Book Award and Newbery Medal
- Holes Special Edition (1998)
- Stanley Yelnats' Survival Guide to Camp Green Lake (2003)
- Small Steps (2006)

Other books

- Johnny's in the Basement (1981)
- Someday Angeline (1983)
- Sixth Grade Secrets (1987) (known as Pig City in the UK)
- There's a Boy in the Girls' Bathroom (1987)
- The Boy Who Lost His Face (1989)
- Dogs Don't Tell Jokes (1991)
- The Cardturner (2010)
- Captain Tory (2011) (collected in The Chronicles of Harris Burdick: Fourteen Amazing Authors Tell the Tales)
- Fuzzy Mud (2015)
- The Magician of Tiger Castle (2025)
