= Small Steps (novel) =

2006 novel by Louis Sachar

- US first edition cover
- Author: Louis Sachar
- Cover artist: Amy Guip
- Language: English
- Series: Holes
- Genre: Young adult novel
- Publisher: Delacorte Press (US); Bloomsbury (UK); Doubleday Canada (CAN)
- Publication date: January 10, 2006
- Publication place: United States
- Pages: 257

Small Steps is a 2006 young adult novel by American author Louis Sachar, first published by Delacorte Books (Dell). It is a spin–off to Sachar's critically acclaimed novel Holes, focusing on Theodore "Armpit" Johnson, a secondary character from Holes.

== Plot ==
Two years after his release from Camp Green Lake, Theodore "Armpit" Johnson is living in Austin, Texas trying to build a stable lifestyle by working for a landscaping company and caring for his neighbor Ginny McDonald, a ten-year-old girl with cerebral palsy. He meets Rex "X-Ray" Washburn, a friend from Camp Green Lake, who asks for his help in a ticket scalping scheme for teen pop star Kaira DeLeon's upcoming concert. Armpit tries to use two tickets to impress a crush who cannot go; instead, he takes Ginny. When they present the tickets, they turn out to be counterfeit, and Armpit is beaten and handcuffed by police officers. Ginny has a seizure, which the officers misinterpret as a reaction to drugs. When singer Kaira finds out, she invites them backstage, and she later forms a friendship with Armpit.

X-Ray later reveals that he sold the original tickets and the ones he gave Armpit were photocopies; he returns the profit to Armpit. Later, Armpit is questioned by Detective Debbie Newberg of the Austin Police Department, and he invents a fake suspect to avoid getting accused of ticket scalping.

Kaira invites Armpit to San Francisco, but before he goes, he is attacked by members of the scalping ring. They threaten to expose Armpit unless he gives them a letter from Kaira. Armpit meets Kaira in San Francisco and asks her for a new letter to sell, but she feels like he's using her, and they have an argument. Later Kaira's manager and stepfather, Jerome "El Genius" Paisley, attacks Kaira with a baseball bat as part of a plan to steal her money, framing Armpit for the murder. The attack continues until Armpit and Kaira's bodyguard intervene. After Kaira is safe and Armpit has returned to Texas, he is interviewed again by Detective Newberg, who admits she figured out about the scalping ring but will not be pressing charges. Jerome goes to jail, and Kaira discovers her mother's best friend has stolen her savings. She decides to continue making music to recoup some of her finances.

The story ends when Armpit hears Kaira sing a song she wrote about him on the radio and accepts that his life cannot revolve around her; instead, he decides to continue with his plan of taking small steps toward making a better life for himself.

== Reception ==
In a review, Josh Lacey commented Small Steps "has a lot to recommend – funny things, a fast-moving story, some emotive scenes, an interesting central character – but does inevitably suffer by comparison with Sachar's last novel." During his review for the New York Times, A.O. Scott praised the novel's prose as being "clear and relaxed, and funny in a low-key, observant way," and observed that unlike Holes, in Small Steps "the realism is more conventional, and the book sticks more closely to the genre of young-adult problem literature."

== Publishing history ==
- Sachar, Louis. Small Steps. New York: Delacorte, 2006. Print.
- Sachar, Louis. Small Steps, Holes Series, New York: Delacorte, 2006. Press.
