= Holes (novel) =

1998 novel by Louis Sachar

- Author: Louis Sachar
- Language: English
- Genre: Adventure, mystery, fantasy
- Publisher: Farrar, Straus and Giroux (US); Bloomsbury Publishing (UK); Ediciones SM (Spain)
- Publication date: August 20, 1998
- Publication place: United States
- ISBN: 978-0-786-22186-8
- Dewey Decimal: [Fic] 21
- LC Class: PZ7.S1185 Ho 1998

Holes is a 1998 middle grade novel written by Louis Sachar and first published by Farrar, Straus and Giroux. The book centers on Stanley Yelnats IV, a young boy who is sent to Camp Green Lake, a correctional boot camp in a desert in Texas, after being wrongfully convicted of theft. The plot explores the history of the area and how the actions of several characters in the past have affected Stanley's life in the present. These interconnecting stories touch on themes such as labor, boyhood and masculinity, friendship, meaning of names, illiteracy, elements of fairy tales, and racism.

The book was both a critical and commercial success. Much of the praise for the book has centered around its complex plot, interesting characters, and representation of people of color and incarcerated youth. It won the 1998 US National Book Award for Young People's Literature and the 1999 Newbery Medal for the year's "most distinguished contribution to American literature for children". In 2012 it was ranked number six among all-time children's novels in a survey published by School Library Journal.

Holes was adapted by Walt Disney Pictures as a feature film of the same name released in 2003. The film received generally positive reviews from critics, was commercially successful, and was released in conjunction with the book companion Stanley Yelnats' Survival Guide to Camp Green Lake. A spin-off sequel to Holes entitled Small Steps was published in 2006 and centers on one of the secondary characters in the novel, Theodore "Armpit" Johnson.

== Background ==
Holes is one of 42 books written by Louis Sachar, most of which are classified as children's literature. The novel is categorized as middle grade literature but has also been labeled as young adult literature, realistic fiction, a tall tale, a folk tale, a fairy tale, a children's story, a postmodern novel, detective fiction, and a historical legend. Holes is considered an outlier of all Sachar's published books, for its complex plot, character development, and elements of teen angst and mystery. Sachar says he "never intended to write a grim story" and instead "wanted it to be fun and adventurous". The narrative of Holes is generally linear but also resembles multi-spatial and multidirectional narratives, similar to features of postmodern literature. Holes was inspired by Sachar's dislike for the heat in Austin, Texas, the home state of his family.

== Plot ==
Stanley Yelnats IV is wrongfully convicted of theft and is consequentially sent to Camp Green Lake, a juvenile corrections facility in Texas. The novel presents Stanley's story together with two other linked stories.

=== Elya Yelnats ===
Elya Yelnats is 15 years old and lives in Latvia. He is in love with Myra Menke, the most beautiful girl in the village. Myra's father has decided she should marry when she turns fifteen in two months. Fifty-seven-year-old Igor Barkov offers his fattest pig to Myra's father in exchange for her hand so Elya asks his friend Madame Zeroni, an old "Egyptian" fortune teller with a missing foot, for help. She warns him that Myra is an empty-headed girl, but gives him a piglet and tells him to carry it to the top of the mountain every day and sing a special song while it drinks from a stream that runs uphill. If he does this, according to Madame Zeroni, his pig will be fatter than any of Igor's. In return, she requests that Elya carry her up the mountain. She warns him that if he does not, his family will be cursed.

Elya follows Madame Zeroni's directions until the last day, when he takes a bath instead of carrying the pig up the hill. His pig and Igor's weigh exactly the same, so Myra's father lets her decide whom to marry. When Myra is unable to choose, Elya realizes Madame Zeroni was right about Myra. He tells her to marry Igor and keep his pig and, forgetting his promise to Madame Zeroni, leaves for America. There, he marries the kind and intelligent Sarah Miller but is continually beset by bad luck. The song that he sang to the pig becomes a lullaby passed down by his family.

=== Kissin' Kate Barlow ===
In the year 1888, Green Lake is a flourishing Texas village on its namesake lake. Katherine Barlow, a local schoolteacher famous for her spiced peaches, falls in love with Sam, an African-American onion farmer. She rejects the advances of Charles Walker, the richest man in town, who is nicknamed "Trout" because his feet smell like dead fish. After Katherine and Sam are seen kissing, Trout raises a mob to burn down the schoolhouse. Katherine goes to the sheriff for help, but he refuses to help her and instead demands a kiss. Katherine and Sam attempt to escape across the lake in Sam's rowboat, but Trout intercepts them with his motorboat. He shoots Sam dead and wrecks his boat, while Katherine is "rescued" against her wishes. From that day on, no rain falls upon Green Lake.

Three days later, Katherine shoots and kills the sheriff. She becomes the outlaw "Kissin' Kate Barlow", so named because she leaves a red lipstick kiss on the cheeks of the men she kills. She robs Stanley Yelnats I, son of Elya Yelnats, and leaves him stranded in the desert. Seventeen days later, he is rescued by hunters, but he is delirious and can only explain his survival by saying he "found refuge on God's thumb".

After twenty years, Katherine retires to the ruins of Green Lake, now reduced to a ghost town with the namesake lake now a playa. She is confronted by Trout and his wife, now destitute, who demand that she reveal the location of her hidden loot. Katherine refuses, telling them that their descendants could dig holes for the next hundred years without finding it. She lets herself be bitten by a highly venomous yellow-spotted lizard, and dies laughing.

=== Camp Green Lake ===
Stanley Yelnats IV's family seems to be cursed, jokingly always blaming Stanley's "no-good-dirty-rotten-pig-stealing-great-great-grandfather" Elya for their constant misfortunes. Stanley, who is in middle school, is convicted of stealing a pair of athletic shoes that baseball player Clyde "Sweet Feet" Livingston had donated to a charity auction for the homeless; in reality, Stanley had just picked up the shoes when they fell from an overpass. He is sentenced to 18 months at Camp Green Lake, a juvenile corrections facility.

Prisoners at Camp Green Lake are required to "build character" by digging one cylindrical hole five feet wide and five feet deep every day. The Warden allows campers a day off if they find anything "interesting". The leader of Stanley's group, a boy nicknamed X-Ray, tells Stanley to give him anything interesting he finds. Late one day, Stanley finds an empty lipstick tube with "KB" engraved on it. He gives it to X-Ray, who pretends to find it the next morning. For the next week and a half, the Warden has the boys excavate the area of X-Ray's supposed discovery. Stanley concludes that she is searching for something.

Stanley learns that another prisoner, Zero, is illiterate. Zero volunteers to dig part of Stanley's hole each day if Stanley teaches him to read. When one of the counselors, Mr. Pendanski, says that Zero is too stupid to learn to read, Zero smashes Mr. Pendanski's face with his shovel and flees into the desert. When Zero does not return, the Warden assumes he has died. To avoid an investigation, she orders Mr. Pendanski to destroy Zero's records.

Stanley goes into the desert to save Zero. He finds Zero hiding under the wreck of a rowboat. Zero has survived on what he calls "sploosh", a peachy nectar stored in old jars he found under the boat. Stanley and Zero drink the last of the sploosh. Zero refuses to return to camp, so they head for a nearby mountain, Big Thumb, that looks like a thumbs up sign. As they ascend the mountain, Zero collapses due to exhaustion. Stanley carries Zero up the hill. He finds water, gives it to Zero, and sings his family lullaby.

Stanley and Zero survive on Big Thumb for a week, eating wild onions from Sam's old onion fields. Zero, whose real name is Hector Zeroni, reveals that he stole Clyde Livingston's shoes. He was homeless and needed new shoes. When he realized everyone was making a commotion about the missing shoes, he discarded them by putting them on the roof of a moving car, and they accidentally landed on Stanley.

The boys secretly return to Camp Green Lake, and overnight, they dig where Stanley found the lipstick tube. They find a suitcase but are caught by the camp staff. The Warden, Mr. Sir, and the counselors stand watch over the boys all night, but they do not approach because the boys are in a nest of highly venomous yellow-spotted lizards. Stanley and Zero, however, are safe from the lizards because they smell like onions (which the lizards are known to avoid). When the sun rises, Stanley's lawyer Ms. Morengo and the state attorney general arrive; Stanley's conviction has been overturned. The Warden claims that the suitcase was stolen from her, but the suitcase has "Stanley Yelnats" written on it. Stanley refuses to leave without Hector, so Ms. Morengo asks to see Hector's file. When Hector's records are unable to be found, Ms. Morengo demands that he be released too. As they drive away, rain falls on Camp Green Lake for the first time in 110 years.

The Attorney General shuts down Camp Green Lake. The Warden, whose real name is Ms. Walker, is forced to sell the land.

Hector is revealed to be Madame Zeroni's great-great-great-grandson. Therefore, when Stanley carried Hector up the mountain, he broke the curse. The next day, Stanley's father invents a peach-scented product that eliminates foot odor; the boys name it "Sploosh". The suitcase, which had belonged to Stanley's great-grandfather, contains financial instruments worth nearly two million dollars. Stanley and Hector split the money, and Hector hires private investigators to find his mother. A year and a half later, the Yelnats house hosts a Super Bowl party celebrating Clyde Livingston's endorsement of Sploosh. Hector's mother softly sings to him a second verse to the Yelnats' family lullaby.

== Characters ==
=== Camp Green Lake ===
- Stanley Yelnats IV (also known as "Caveman" by the rest of the campers): Stanley is a 14-year-old boy who did not have any friends at school and was often picked on by his classmates and bullied due to being overweight. Stanley's family is cursed with bad luck, and although they do not have much money, they always try to remain hopeful and look on the bright side of things. Stanley shares these traits with his family and, although he does not have a lot of self-confidence, he is not easily depressed, a characteristic that helps him adjust to the horrendous conditions of Camp Green Lake. However, he has a habit of blaming his great-great-grandfather when he gets in trouble. As the book progresses, Stanley slowly gains strength. He identifies the people who threaten him, like the Warden. While he tries not to get in trouble, he also stands up for himself and his friends and family. Stanley rebels for the rights of his friends when he steals Mr. Sir's truck to look for Zero in the dry lake bed.
- Zero (Hector Zeroni): Zero is known to be the best digger and is the smallest and youngest inmate at Camp Green Lake. He is considered to be stupid by the other boys and the counselors alike since he does not often speak due to the fact that he is wary of those who mock him. He is said to always have a scowl on his face and does not like to answer questions. He lacks an education, meaning he is unable to read or write. Despite this, he is intelligent and manages to stand up for himself in the face of adversity, breaking Mr. Pendanski's nose with a shovel after one too many snide remarks. Zero is shown to be an honest character after becoming close friends with Stanley. Zero is the one who stole the shoes that Stanley was arrested for and accused of stealing. He is the descendant of Madame Zeroni, the woman who put a curse on Stanley's family. He has been homeless for most of his life, as well as getting separated from his mother at a very young age. Although he suffers quite a bit, he always seems to persevere and he has a happy ending.
- X-Ray (Rex Washburn): X-Ray is the unofficial head of the boys in Group D, who was sent to Camp Green Lake after he was caught selling dried herbs to people who thought they were buying marijuana (as revealed in the spin-off novel Small Steps). His nickname X-ray comes from it being pig Latin of his actual name, Rex. X-Ray maintains his position as the leader of the boys even though he is one of the smallest and can barely see without his glasses. X-Ray is able to maintain his position at the head of the group through a system of rewards and allies. Every time Stanley does something nice for X-Ray, X-Ray rewards Stanley. He stands up for Stanley when the other boys pick on him (i.e, X-Ray decides Stanley will be called "Caveman" and moves him up one spot in the line for water). When Stanley becomes friends with Zero, however, X-Ray's hierarchy is threatened and he becomes hostile toward Stanley.
- Squid (Alan): Squid is a member of Group D at Camp Green Lake. Often, he taunts Stanley for sending and receiving letters to and from his mother. Squid is very tough but subservient to X-Ray's rules. He is revealed to have a sensitive side to him, however, when Stanley wakes to hear him crying one night. Alan later asks Stanley to write to his (Alan's) mother when Stanley leaves Camp Green Lake.
- Armpit (Theodore Thomas Johnson): A member of Group D. Like the other boys, Armpit is rough, shoving Stanley to the ground when he calls him Theodore. However, in the Holes spin-off novel Small Steps, he is shown to have become hardworking and caring. His nickname Armpit is due to him being stung by a scorpion at camp and the venom traveling up into his armpit, causing him to complain about his armpit hurting.
- Magnet (José): Another member of Group D. Magnet earned his nickname because of his ability to steal and refers to his fingers as "little magnets."
- Zigzag (Ricky): Described as being the tallest kid of Group D, constantly looking like he has been electrocuted, with frizzy hair. Stanley often thinks he is the strangest camper at Camp Green Lake. Zigzag hits Stanley on the head with a shovel, but later apologizes. Zigzag suffers from paranoia, highlighting his displayed "craziness".
- Warden (Louise Walker): Running Camp Green Lake, she is soft-spoken but intimidating. Known to be violent and abusive, she uses her power and privilege to get what she wants and make members of the camp do as she pleases. She is often thought to have hidden cameras to spy on the campers, including in the showers, causing Stanley to be paranoid whenever he takes a shower. She wears nail polish laced with rattlesnake venom, and scratches Mr. Sir when he displeases her. She has the members of Camp Green Lake dig holes to look for Kate Barlow's hidden treasure. She is the granddaughter of Trout Walker. Her family had been digging the treasure out since her birth, but to no success. She is known for her catchphrase, "Excuse me?".
- Mr. Sir (Marion Sevillo): The overseer/head counselor at Camp Green Lake, below only the warden. He is constantly eating sunflower seeds after quitting smoking. He is rough, tough, and tyrannical, embracing his meanness and enjoying asserting his power over the boys. However, his cowardly nature is revealed when he encounters his biggest fear, yellow-spotted lizards. He also watches his words around the warden, the only person more powerful than him. While his backstory is never told in the book, his true identity is revealed in the film as a paroled criminal named Marion Sevillo, who was arrested for an unknown crime in El Paso, and later violated his parole by carrying a gun.
- Mr. Steve Pendanski: Mr. Pendanski is the counselor in charge of group D at Camp Green Lake. Mr. Pendanski has a generally friendly demeanor, yet is just as cruel as the Warden and Mr. Sir. His darker side comes out in his frequent mistreatment of Zero, as well as in his callous lack of concern when Stanley and Zero are covered in deadly yellow-spotted lizards. Zero attacks Mr. Pendanski with a shovel. In the film, he is addressed as "Dr. Pendanski," though he is revealed not to be a real doctor.

=== Town of Green Lake ===
- Katherine Barlow (Kissin' Kate Barlow): Katherine Barlow is a sweet and intelligent woman who teaches in a one-room school house on Green Lake one hundred and ten years before Stanley arrives at Camp Green Lake. She falls in love with Sam, an African American man who sells onions in the town. Although the rest of the white people in the town are racist and enforce rules that prohibit African American people from going to school, Kate, who is white, does not care about the color of a person's skin and she loves Sam for the person that he is. When Kate and Sam kiss, the angry townsfolk kill Sam and destroy her schoolhouse. Kate is devastated by Sam's death and becomes Kissin' Kate Barlow, one of the most feared outlaws in the West. She leaves her mark by kissing the bodies of the men she killed; if she had only robbed them, she would leave them in the hot desert. She is the outlaw responsible for robbing Stanley Yelnats I (Stanley's ancestor). After she is confronted by Charles "Trout" Walker and his wife Linda, who demand to know the location of her buried loot, Kate is bitten by a yellow-spotted lizard, and dies laughing, knowing the Walkers will never find her treasure. The lipstick tube that Stanley finds during his second week at Camp Green Lake was owned by Kate.
- Sam: Sam is an African-American farmer in the town Green Lake, Texas who grows onions. He believes onions are the cure to everything and makes many remedies from onions. He also has an immense love for his donkey, Mary Lou. His relationship with Kate begins when he exchanges his onions for her jars of spiced peaches. He is shot in cold blood by Charles "Trout" Walker when Sam and Kate try to escape. His death is implied to have set a curse upon the lake, causing the rain to stop coming and the lake to dry up.
- Charles "Trout" Walker: Charles "Trout" Walker is an extremely spoiled son of the richest family in Green Lake. He gets upset when Kate denies his wish to court her. This adds on to the reason of him leading the townspeople to burn down the schoolhouse and kill Sam. His nickname Trout comes from his foot fungus that causes his feet to smell like dead fish. After Kate leaves to become an outlaw, he marries Linda Miller but his family loses everything when the lake dries up. He is the Warden's grandfather, who, upon his death, opens up the juvenile detention camp to increase the efficiency of finding Kate Barlow's hidden treasure.
- Stanley Yelnats I: Stanley Yelnats I is the son of Elya Yelnats as well as the great-grandfather of Stanley Yelnats IV. He had his treasure stolen by Kate Barlow while he was moving from New York to California. He is known to have survived by climbing to the top of a thumb-shaped mountain (God's Thumb) which happens to be Sam's old onion field.

=== Mid-1800s Latvia ===
- Elya Yelnats: Elya is the great-great-grandfather of Stanley. He is often referred to as his "No-good-dirty-rotten-pig-stealing-great-great-grandfather", constantly being blamed for everything that goes wrong in Stanley's life. He is considered to be the reason why the Yelnats family has such bad luck. As he sets off for America, he forgets to fulfill the promise he made to an old woman named Madame Zeroni. This causes generations of bad luck to trickle down the Yelnats family tree. However, he does pass down an important song that Madame Zeroni taught him in Latvia, which breaks the curse.
- Madame Zeroni: Madame Zeroni is the great-great-great-grandmother of Hector Zeroni (Zero). She is great friends with Elya Yelnats, and she gives him a pig to help him marry Myra Menke. Because Elya breaks his promise of carrying her to the top of the mountain, she is considered to be the one who put a "curse" on the Yelnats family.
- Myra Menke: Myra is the most beautiful girl in the Latvian village Elya lives in. Madame Zeroni considers her inadequate and her head as empty as a flowerpot. Myra's father promises to award her hand in marriage to whichever suitor can raise the fattest pig. When the pigs offered are the same size, Myra asks Elya and Igor Barkov to guess a number between 1 and 10, showing her inability to make her own decisions. Upon realizing this, Elya allows Myra to marry Igor.
- Igor Barkov: Igor is Elya's competitor for the hand of Myra Menke. He is an old, fat, successful pig farmer.

=== Minor characters ===
- Mr. Yelnats (Stanley Yelnats III): Mr. Yelnats is Stanley's father. He is an inventor and quite smart, but extremely unlucky. He attempts to discover a way to recycle old sneakers and because of this, the Yelnats' apartment smells bad. However, he eventually discovers a cure to ridding foot odor and is able to hire a lawyer, Ms. Morengo, to get Stanley out of Camp Green Lake.
- Mrs. Yelnats (Tiffany Yelnats): Mrs. Yelnats is Stanley's mother. She does not believe in curses but always points out the terrible luck that the Yelnats have.
- Grandpa Yelnats (Stanley Yelnats II): Grandpa is Stanley's paternal grandfather.
- Barf Bag (Lewis): A "camper" who left Camp Green Lake before Stanley arrived. He deliberately got a rattlesnake to bite him in order to be hospitalized.
- Clyde "Sweet Feet" Livingston: A famous baseball player whose shoes Stanley is accused of stealing. He has the same foot fungus as Trout Walker, and later endorses Mr. Yelnats' Sploosh foot odor cure.
- Twitch (Brian): A car thief who arrives at camp after Zero runs away. He got his nickname for his constant twitching.

== Setting ==
The majority of the book takes place in Camp Green Lake, a dried-up lake located in the US state of Texas. Camp Green Lake is a correctional boot camp, where "campers" spend most of their time digging holes. The name is a misnomer, as the area is a parched, barren desert. The only weather is the scorching sun. No rain has fallen since the day Sam was murdered. The only plants mentioned are two oak trees in front of the Warden's cabin; the book notes that "the Warden owns the shade." The abandoned town of Green Lake is located by the side of the lakebed. The majority of the book alternates between the present day story of Stanley Yelnats, the story of Elya Yelnats in Latvia (ca. mid-19th century) and the story of Katherine Barlow in the town of Green Lake in the 1880s. Later chapters focus less on the past stories and more on the present.

== Themes ==
=== Fairy tales ===
The themes typical of a folk or fairy tale are present throughout the novel, notable in both Stanley and Elya's narratives. Elya must go on an adventure to win his love's approval and prove his own worth and he is eventually placed under a witch's curse. Stanley's bad luck is blamed on the curse left on his great-great-grandfather and the Yelnats family easily believes in the power of this curse. Both Stanley and Elya are similar to fairy tale characters and are morally good, heroic protagonists who must overcome the challenges predestined for them. Both story lines are accompanied by a magic that is seen in the mountain stream, Madame Zeroni's song, and the healing power of the onions. Each of these elements in Holes mirror elements frequently found in fairy tales.

=== Names ===
Throughout the novel, names act as a theme that allows the characters to disassociate their lives at Camp Green Lake from their lives back in the real world. Names also demonstrate irony—Camp Green Lake is not actually a camp, it is located in a desert, and there is no lake. The "campers" all label themselves differently and identify with names such as Armpit and X-Ray and the guards are referred to as counselors. One of the counselors, Mr. Pendanski, is referred to by the boys as "Mom", representing the absent parents at Camp Green Lake. Only the woman in charge is referred to in a prison-like way and is called "Warden". The different names allow the boys to bond and form a team based in their hatred for their work and the counselors. Many of the characters also have names that connect them to their family history, like the passing down of "Stanley Yelnats" and Zero's last name of Zeroni, and remind them how the actions of their ancestors affect their modern-day lives. Stanley is the fourth Stanley Yelnats in his family, a name that is passed down due to its palindromic nature and adds to the connection to family history. In an interview, when asked about the significance of specific names in his novels, Louis Sachar says "when I get to naming characters, there's nothing leading up to it...a name is just a name." He typically writes a name for a character, and moves on, because otherwise it disrupts his flow of writing.

=== Labor ===
Labor is seen throughout the novel as the children are forced to dig holes while at Camp Green Lake. This theme is unusual in children's literature as many authors portray children as carefree and without responsibility. If they do engage in work, it is synonymous with play. Critic Maria Nikolajeva contends that Holes is set apart through the not just manual, but forced labor Stanley and the other campers do daily. This is first referenced at the beginning of the book when the purpose of the camp is stated: "If you take a bad boy and make him dig a hole every day in the hot sun, it will turn him into a good boy."

=== Masculinity ===
Masculinity is seen in the novel through the depiction of "boyhood" and coming of age. Boyhood is portrayed to some degree separation and distancing from things feminine, specifically a mother figure. some traits, symbols, and characters Some femininity in Holes are portrayed as frightening and threatening, particularly represented by the only known female at the camp: the Warden. There are many instances of quotes and comments by characters within the novel labeling women and girls as being either incapable or undesirable, which was viewed as unacceptable. Particularly, Mr. Sir says "You're not in the Girl Scouts anymore,".

=== Friendship ===
Friendship is seen throughout the novel through Stanley Yelnats' relationships with the other boys at Camp Green Lake. Particularly Stanley and Zero's friendship roots from an agreement that both boys can benefit from: Stanley teaches Zero to read and write, and Zero digs some of Stanley's holes. Many of the boys at the camp have a strong loyalty to each other and it is indicated that after their departure from the camp, they remained friends.

== Reception ==
Holes has received many accolades:

- John Newbery Medal
- 1998, US National Book Award for Young People's Literature
- 1998, American Library Association, Best Books for Young Adults
- 1999 Newbery Medal for the year's "most distinguished contribution to American literature for children"
- 1999, Boston Globe-Horn Book Award for Fiction
- 2000, Zilveren Zoen
- 2000, Flicker Tale Children's Book Award
- 2000, Pennsylvania Young Readers' Choice Award for Grades 6-8
- 2000, Dorothy Canfield Fisher Children's Book Award
- 2000, Premi Protagonista Jove for Categoria 14-15 anys
- 2001, William Allen White Children's Book Award
- 2001, West Australian Young Readers' Book Award (WAYRBA) for Older Readers
- 2001, Grand Canyon Reader Award for Teen Book
- 2001, Nene Award
- 2001, Maryland Black-Eyed Susan Book Award for Grade 6-9
- 2001, Massachusetts Children's Book Award
- 2001, Evergreen Teen Book Award
- 2001, Pacific Northwest Library Association Young Reader's Choice Award for Junior
- 2001, Deutscher Jugendliteraturpreis Nominee for Jugendbuch
- 2001, New Mexico Land of Enchantment Award for Young Adult
- 2001, Oklahoma Sequoyah Award for Children and YA
- 2002, Rebecca Caudill Young Readers' Book Award
- 2002, Sunshine State Young Readers Award for Grades 3-5 and Grades 6-8
- 2003, Soaring Eagle Book Award

Holes, considered the most complex of Louis Sachar's published books, is often praised for its complex plot, character development, and suspense. Over two decades after its original publication, Holes continues to be well received by critics and was ranked number 6 among all-time children's novels by School Library Journal in 2012. The novel spent over 150 weeks on the New York Times Best Seller List, reaching #1 for Young Adult fiction.

Betsy Hearne of The New York Times applauded the novel's integration of mystery and humor that manages to keep Holes light and fresh, and she characterizes it as a "family read-aloud." Roger Sutton of The Horn Book Magazine called Sachar's declarative style effective, and argues that it helped make the novel more poignant. Sutton appreciated the positive ending and the suspense that leads the reader to it.

== Adaptations ==
=== Film ===
In 2003, Walt Disney Pictures released a film version of Holes, which was directed by Andrew Davis and written by Louis Sachar; the latter also has a cameo in the film.

=== Television ===
In April 2005, Walden Media entered into a co-production deal with The Hatchery to produce a television adaption of Holes that would function as an extension to the 2003 film. The project never materialized.

In April 2023, producer Mike Medavoy told Collider that Disney might be considering adapting Holes as a television series, adding, "I think it's a tribute to the material and a tribute to the people who made it." On January 7, 2025, it was announced that Disney+ had ordered a pilot for a female-lead Holes television series, with Alina Mankin writing and Liz Pheng serving as showrunner. Jac Schaeffer directed the pilot. On April 22, 2025, it was announced that Greg Kinnear, Aidy Bryant and Shay Rudolph were cast for the pilot. On December 12, 2025, it was reported that Disney+ decided to not move forward with the pilot.

== Sequels ==
Two companion novels have followed Holes: Stanley Yelnats' Survival Guide to Camp Green Lake (2003) and Small Steps (2006).

=== Stanley Yelnats' Survival Guide to Camp Green Lake ===
As Louis Sachar states: "Should you ever find yourself at Camp Green Lake—or somewhere similar—this is the guide for you." Written from Stanley's point of view, the book offers advice on everything from scorpions, rattlesnakes, yellow-spotted lizards, etc.

=== Small Steps ===
In this sequel to Holes, former camper Armpit is now 17 and struggling with the challenges facing an African American teenager with a criminal history. A new friendship with Ginny, who has cerebral palsy, a reunion with former friend X-Ray, a ticket-scalping scheme, a beautiful pop singer, and a frame-up all test Armpit's resolve to "Just take small steps and keep moving forward".

Awards
Preceded by Out of the Dust	Newbery Medal recipient 1999	Succeeded by Bud, Not Buddy
Preceded by New category	Winner of the William Allen White Children's Book Award; Grades 6–8; 2001	Succeeded by Bud, Not Buddy
