= Gilles Corrozet =

16th c. French writer, printer, and bookseller

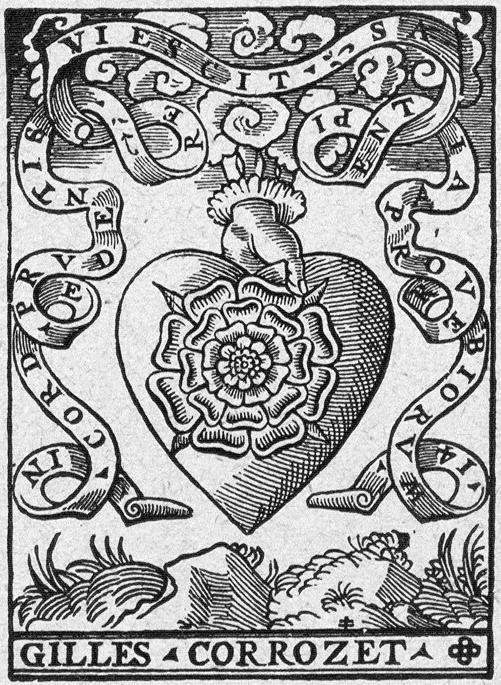
The printer’s device of Gilles Corrozet from a work published in 1541

Gilles Corrozet (4 January 1510 - 4 July 1568, Paris) was a French writer, translator, and printer-bookseller. He published popular guidebooks to Paris, anthologies of poetry, original and translated verse, and emblem books.

Corrozet’s printer's mark was a hand holding a rose enclosed in a heart, punning on his name (Coeur rosier); this was accompanied by a banner with the Biblical motto In corde prudentis requiescit sapientia. Proverbiorum 14. (Wisdom resteth in the heart of him that hath understanding, Proverbs 14.33).

== Life and works ==
Gilles Corrozet was born in 1510 to a family of mercers. His grandfather was the Paris bookseller Pierre Le Brodeur.

Corrozet's contributions to the book trade included writing, translating, and publishing books. His first published work, La fleur des antiquités, singularitez et excellences de la noble & triumphant ville & cite de Paris (1532), was part history, part guidebook to Paris, and stayed in print for decades due to popular demand. Corrozet frequently collaborated with Parisian printer Denis Janot, with whom he published two emblem books, Hecatomgraphie (1540) and Emblemes (1543). These emblem books were collections of brief moral tales (or emblems), consisting of a woodcut illustration, a title, an epigram, and an explanatory verse by Corrozet himself. Illustrated books sold well, and Corrozet adapted the format for some of his other works, including his versifications of Aesop’s Fables, Les Fables du très ancien Esope, mises en rithme françoise (1542). As a publisher, Corrozet also printed books by some of the principal authors of his era, Clément Marot, Pierre de Ronsard, Joachim du Bellay and Pierre Belon.

Corrozet had several children with his first wife, Marie Harel, including two sons who followed him into the book trade. One son, Galiot, managed Corrozet's printing business after his death, while his other son, Jean, sold books in Paris before leaving the industry. His daughter married a man from another family of printer and booksellers, Nicholas Bonfons, who would later publish an edition of Corrozet's La fleur des antiquités. After Marie died in 1562, he re-married in 1563. His second wife, Catherine Cramoisy, came from a family of booksellers. Corrozet died in on July 4, 1568, in Paris.
