= Harmenszoon =

Harmenszoon or Harmensz. is a Dutch surname. Notable people with the surname include:

== Harmensz. ==
- Jan Harmensz. Muller (1571–1628), Dutch engraver and painter

== Harmenszoon ==
- Jacob Harmenszoon (1560–1609), Dutch theologian
- Jan Harmenszoon Krul (1601–1646), Dutch playwright
- Rembrandt (Rembrandt Harmenszoon van Rijnn; 1606–1669), Dutch painter and printmaker
