= Bernard Salomon =

French painter

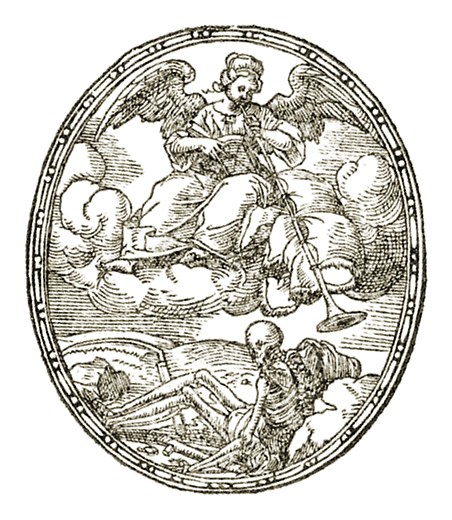
Woodcut of Petrarch's Triumph of Fame by Bernard Salomon, from Bernard Salomon: Illustrateur Lyonnais, 1550

Bernard Salomon (1506–1561), also known as the Little Bernard B. Gallus or Gallo, was a French painter, draftsman and engraver.

Little is known of the life of Bernard Salomon. His place of birth is unknown, but some authors link his origins to a family of belt-makers from Lyon, present in the city since the 15th century. Similarly, it is uncertain where he trained, and the theories that he went to Paris to learn his trade seem superfluous, as the city on the Rhône had a wealth of master wood engravers who would have been able to teach him the fundamentals of the woodcut art.

He married twice: his first wife was Anne Marmot, by whom he had a daughter, Antoinette Salomon, who married the printer Robert Granjon, and a son, Jean Salomon. His second wife was Louise Missilieu. He had three mansions, the last of which was located between rue Pizay and rue de l'Arbre-Sec.

He was commissioned to provide decorations for Ippolito II d'Este in 1540, Henry II of France in 1548, and Jacques Dalbon, Seigneur de Saint Andre in 1550. He worked closely with the printer Jean de Tournes to design, engrave, and illustrate many types of books such as emblem books, documentaries and scientific works, and literary works, including the Bible and Ovid's Metamorphoses (Lyon, Tournes, 1557). Salomon's figures were inspired by the elegant Mannerist art of the School of Fontainebleau, and were inspiration for engravers working in Lyon and became widely distributed and copied.

He is sometimes referred to as "Petit", alluding to the intricate detail Salomon works into his designs at small scale.

== His Art ==
=== Paintings ===
Bernard Salomon was active as a painter, both painting façades in the Italian style and creating decorations for solemn entrances. He supervised the works for the entrance of Henri II in 1548, for that of Governor Jacques d'Albon and for the celebrations of the Treaty of Cateau-Cambrésis in 1559. He was also commissioned to direct the execution of paintings for the entrance of Cardinal Alessandro Farnese in Carpentras in 1553.

For the Lyon entrances, he worked in coordination with Maurice Scève and Barthélemy Aneau; a clear indication of the importance of his role in the humanistic environment in Lyon.

=== Engravings ===
Despite his success as a painter, he is much better known as an engraver. Very few of his paintings have survived, mostly as engravings in feast books. Instead, more than 1,600 engravings have been preserved. It is believed that he worked in a studio, assisted by other engravers who, however, did not reach the same artistic quality. The types of works he illustrated included: the Bible, books of emblems, scientific works, literary works and feast books.

The earliest book with illustrations attributed to him is a work of emblems written by Guillaume de la Perrière and republished by Jean de Tournes in 1545, for which Bernard Salomon produced some 100 small-format engravings.

In 1585, Antoine du Verdier described him as an "excellent engraver of stories".

He worked closely with the printer Jean de Tournes and was his main illustrator. Together they produced several masterpieces of Lyon publishing, including the Bible of 1557 and Ovid's Metamorphoses of the same year.

== Catalogue of printed works ==
The main catalogues of Bernard Salomon's works are to be found in the works of Natalis Rondot and Peter Sharratt.

=== Printed works ===
- Guillaume de La Perrière, Ouvrage d'emblèmes, Jean de Tournes, 1545
- Andrea Alciato, Emblèmes, Jean de Tournes, 1547
- Aesop, Fables, Jean de Tournes, 1547
- Maurice Scève, La Saulsaye, Jean de Tournes, 1547
- Il Petrarca, Jean de Tournes, 1547 and 1550
- Marguerite de Navarre, Margerites de la Marguerite des princesses, 1547
- Claude Paradin, Devises héroïques, 1551
- Guillaume Guéroult, Hymnes du temps et de ses parties, 1560

== Bibliography ==
- Peter Sharratt, Bernard Solomon, illustrator Lyonnais al. "Works of Humanism and Renaissance", Geneva, Droz, 2005 (ISBN 2-600-01000-9) with 259 illustrations
- Philippe Hoch, "Bernard Solomon Lyon illustrator" BBF, 2006, No. 2, p. 108-10
- Natalis Rondot, Bernard Salomon, peintre et tailleur d'histoire à Lyon, au xvi^{e} siècle, Lyon, Imprimerie de Moulins-Rusand, 1897.
- Émile Grangette, Bernard Salomon (typewritten diploma; copy in the possession of the Lyon municipal library), Lyon, Faculté des Lettres, 1963.
- Alfred Cartier, Bibliographie des éditions des de Tournes : imprimeurs lyonnais; mise en ordre avec une introduction et des appendices par Marius Audin; et une notice biographique par E. Vial, Paris, Éditions des Bibliothèques nationales de France, 1970 (1re éd. 1937).
