= Lady Tholose =

Renaissance statue in Toulouse, France

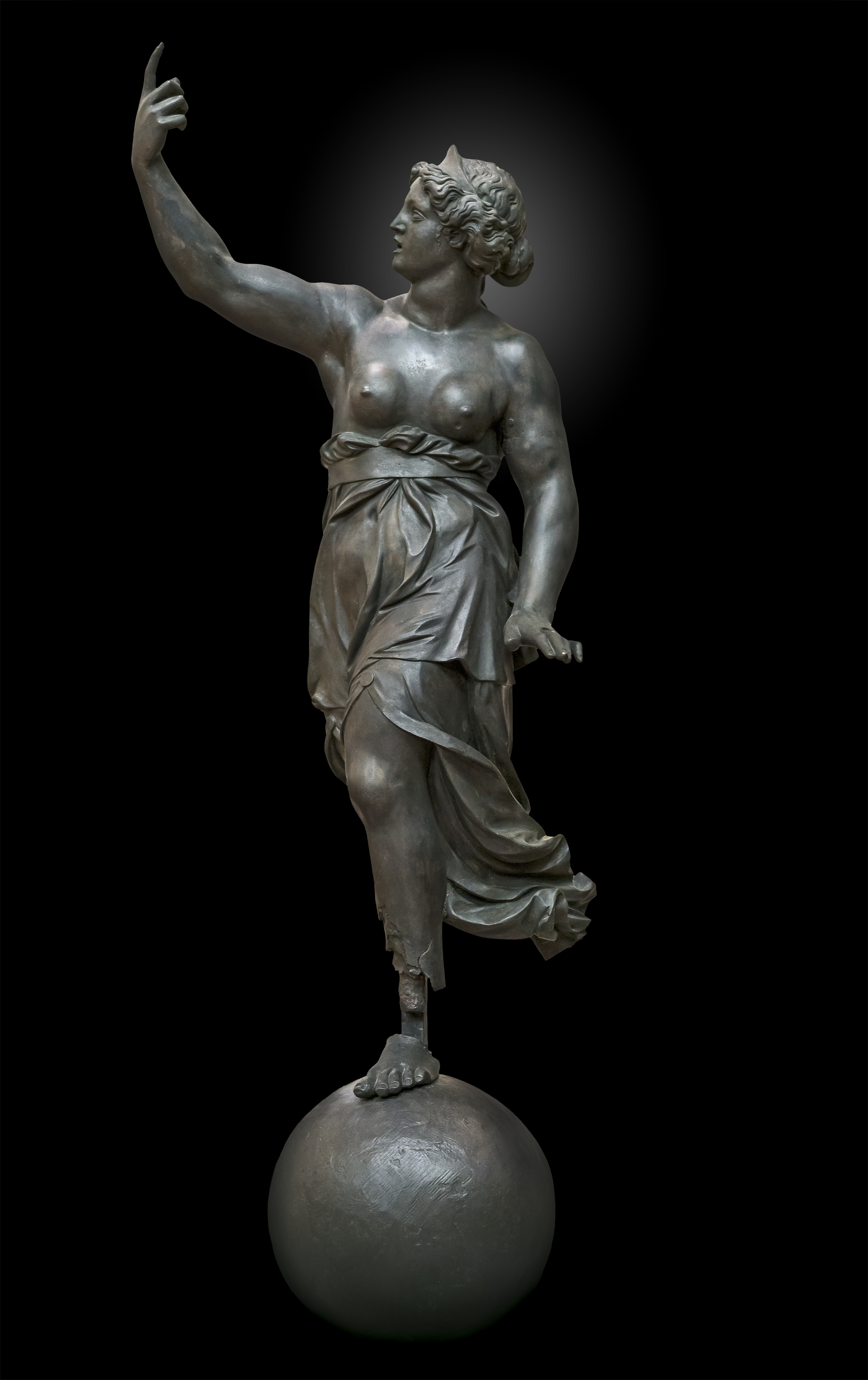
- Artist: Jean Rancy
- Year: 1544 for the wooden model, 1550 for the bronze casting
- Medium: Bronze sculpture
- Subject: Political allegory of municipal power
- Dimensions: 187 (143 for the character alone) cm × 63 cm (74 in × 25 in)
- Location: Musée des Augustins, Toulouse, France

Lady Tholose (French: Dame Tholose) is the name given to a bronze sculpture from the Toulouse Renaissance, a work by the sculptor Jean Rancy and the bronze caster Claude Peilhot.

Under the features of the goddess Pallas Athena, it is an allegory of the city of Toulouse.

== A Renaissance bronze ==
=== A masterpiece by Jean Rancy ===
Demonstrating an impressive level of aesthetic and technical mastery for his time, Jean Rancy created in Lady Tholose a work whose artistic ambition was remarkably advanced for French Renaissance sculpture. The fact is all the more noteworthy that it is an extremely rare example of a large bronze figure being cast outside the French royal workshops in the 16th century.

Lady Tholose is distinguished by the mastery of the wet drapery, the science of gestures, torsions and multiple points of vision that Jean Rancy demonstrated early on. If the face with its regular features and wavy hair correspond to the classical canons, the work stands out by its dynamism: camped on a single support, its movement is accompanied by the flight of sinuous and strongly hollowed folds. Its bare bosom and a short antique dress plated by the wind on the generous forms of its body emphasize its feminine sensuality.

Made more than 15 years before Giambologna's Flying Mercury, Lady Tholose is characterized for its technical and aesthetic ambition.

Lady Tholose : the work of art

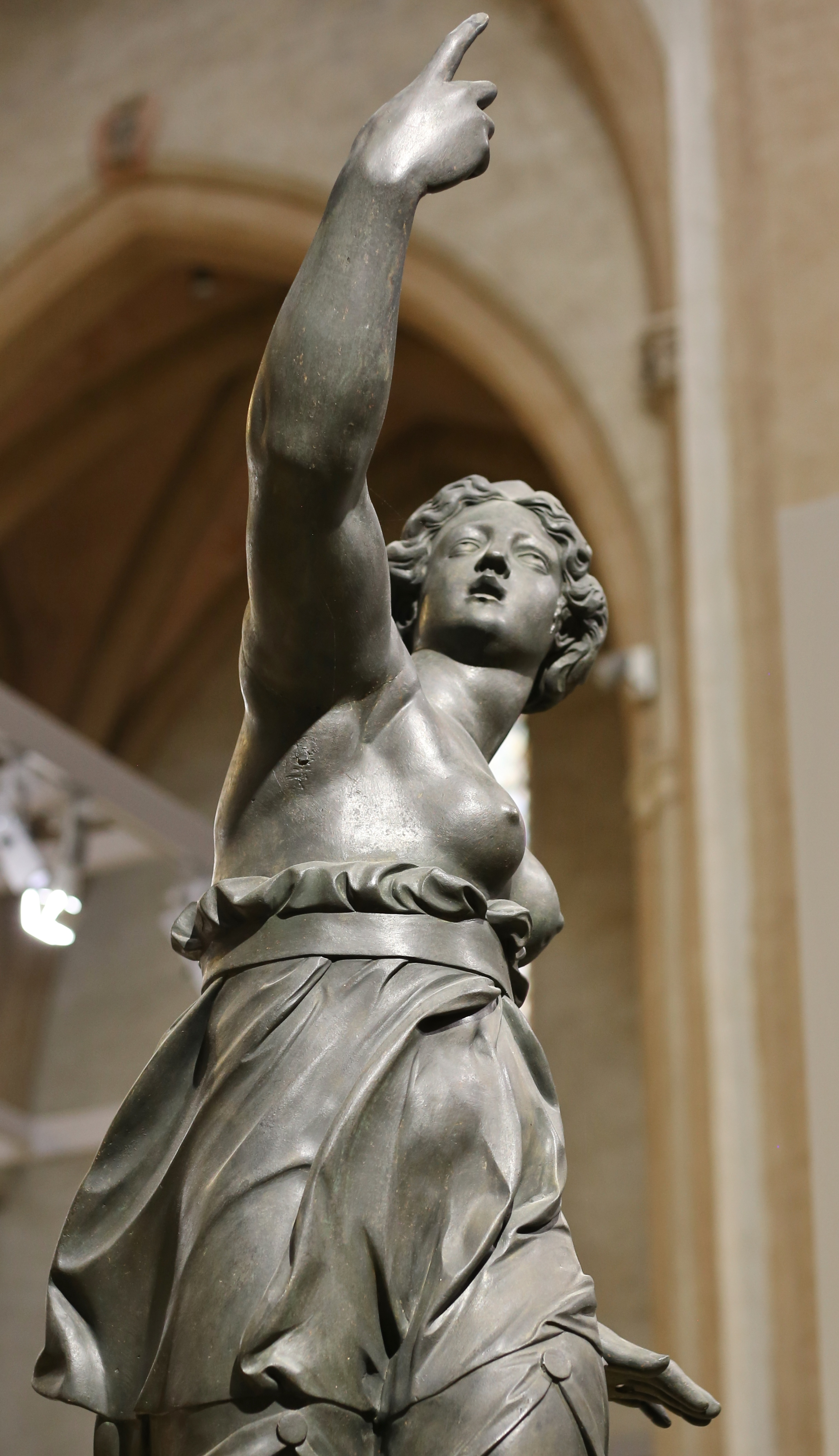
Low angle view

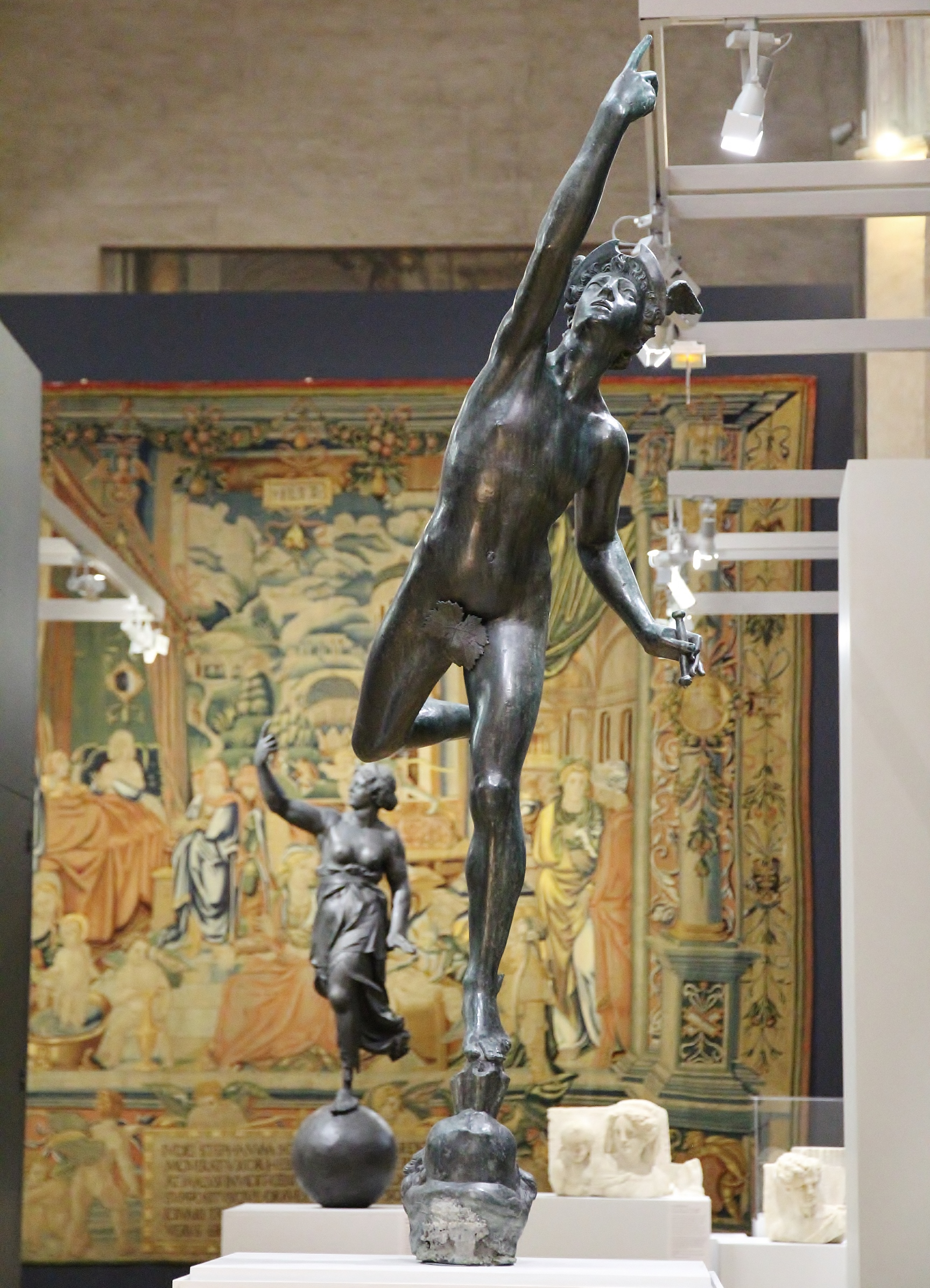
Lady Tholose and a 1624 Toulouse copy of Giambologna's Mercury (1563)

=== History and tribulations ===
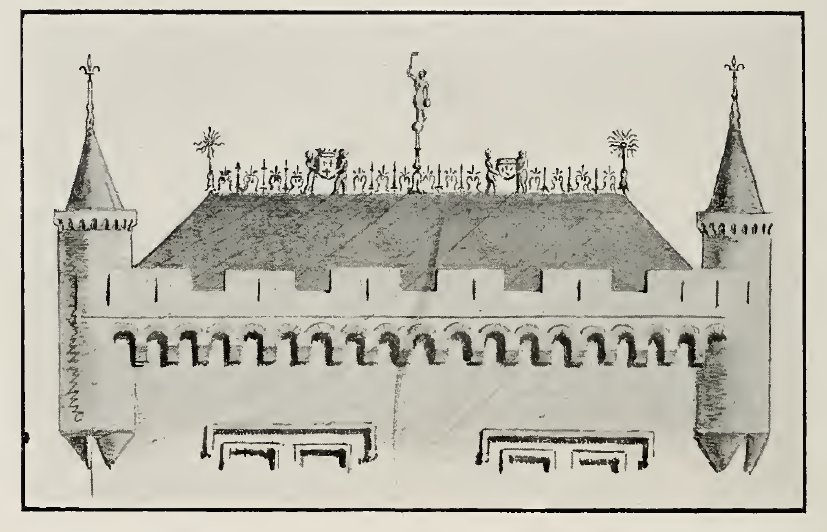
The top of the Donjon of the Capitole as it was originally, with Dame Tholose holding a weather vane (after Jules de Lahondès).

In 1529, the "image carver" Jean Rancy sculpted a wooden statue of a child representing St. Michael, which was gilded and then placed on the roof of the city's Archives Tower (now called the "Capitole Keep") to serve as a weathervane.

In 1544, this child figure was so damaged that the capitouls commissioned the same Jean Rancy for another statue: Lady Tholose. If the wooden model was made as early as 1544 by Rancy, for lack of money it was not until 1550 that the gunner Claude Peilhot proceeded to cast the bronze in the forges of the city's arsenal.

Gilded with gold leaf and placed atop the Archives Tower, a symbolic place of the capitouls' power, Lady Tholose brandished a weathervane with its right arm and remained in place until 1829.

At that time the roof of the tower was in danger of collapse and the statue had to be removed. In 1834 it was endowed with wings and crowns and, thus transformed into "Victory" or "Renown", was installed at the top of the colonne Dupuy to pay homage to the military successes of Dominique Martin Dupuy, a Napoleon's general born in Toulouse. As it rusted, the iron shaft that attached the statue to the column was the cause of the corrosion of its legs.

In 2005 it was replaced on the column by a copy. Restored, it became part of the collections of the Musée des Augustins of Toulouse, where it is displayed nowadays.

In 2008 and 2009 it was one of the major pieces in the exhibition "Cast in Bronze: French Sculpture from Renaissance to Revolution" held successively in Paris, New York and Los Angeles.

Lady Tholose : from the Donjon of the Capitole to the Augustins museum, passing by the Dupuy column

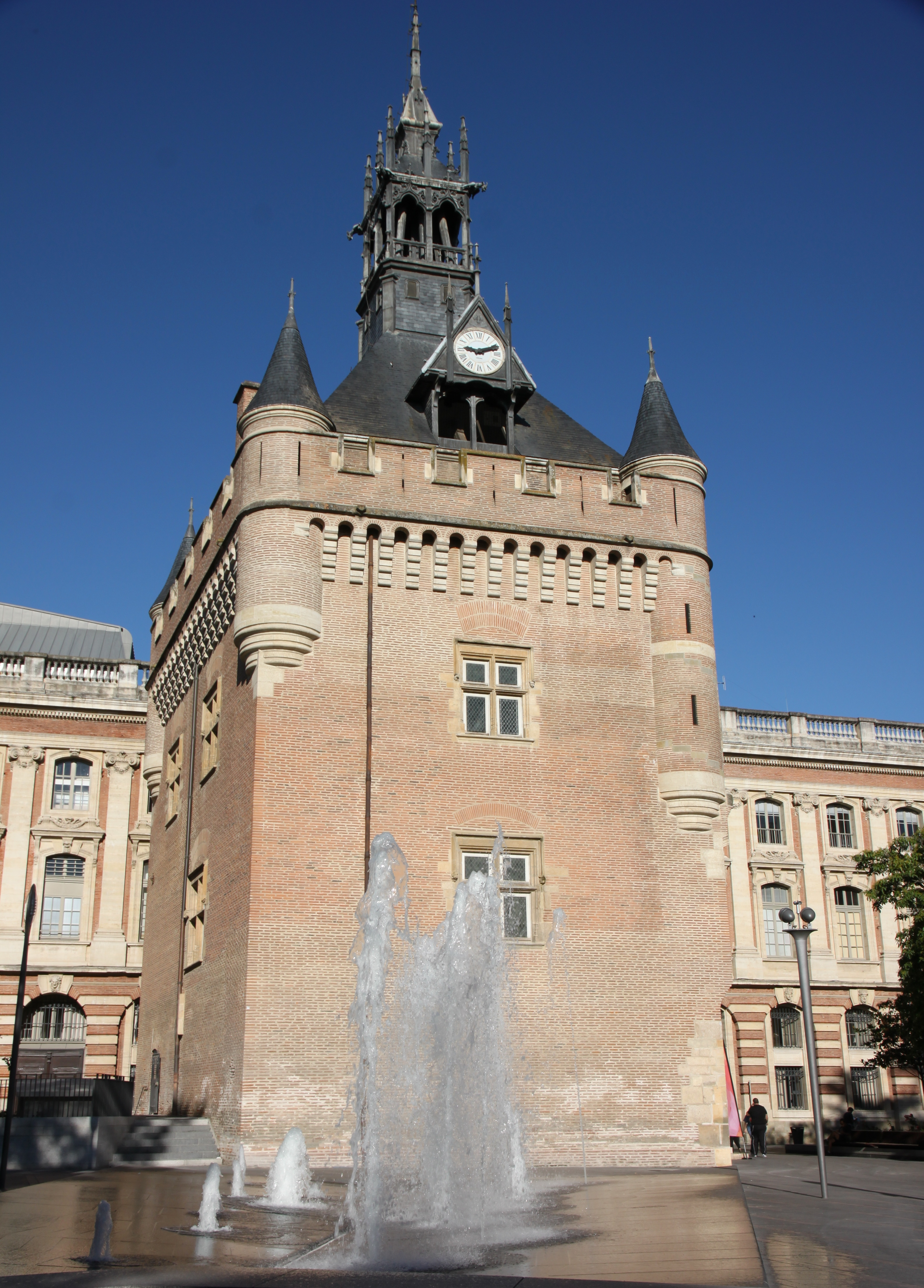
From 1550 to 1829, Lady Tholose stood at the top of the Donjon of the Capitole.

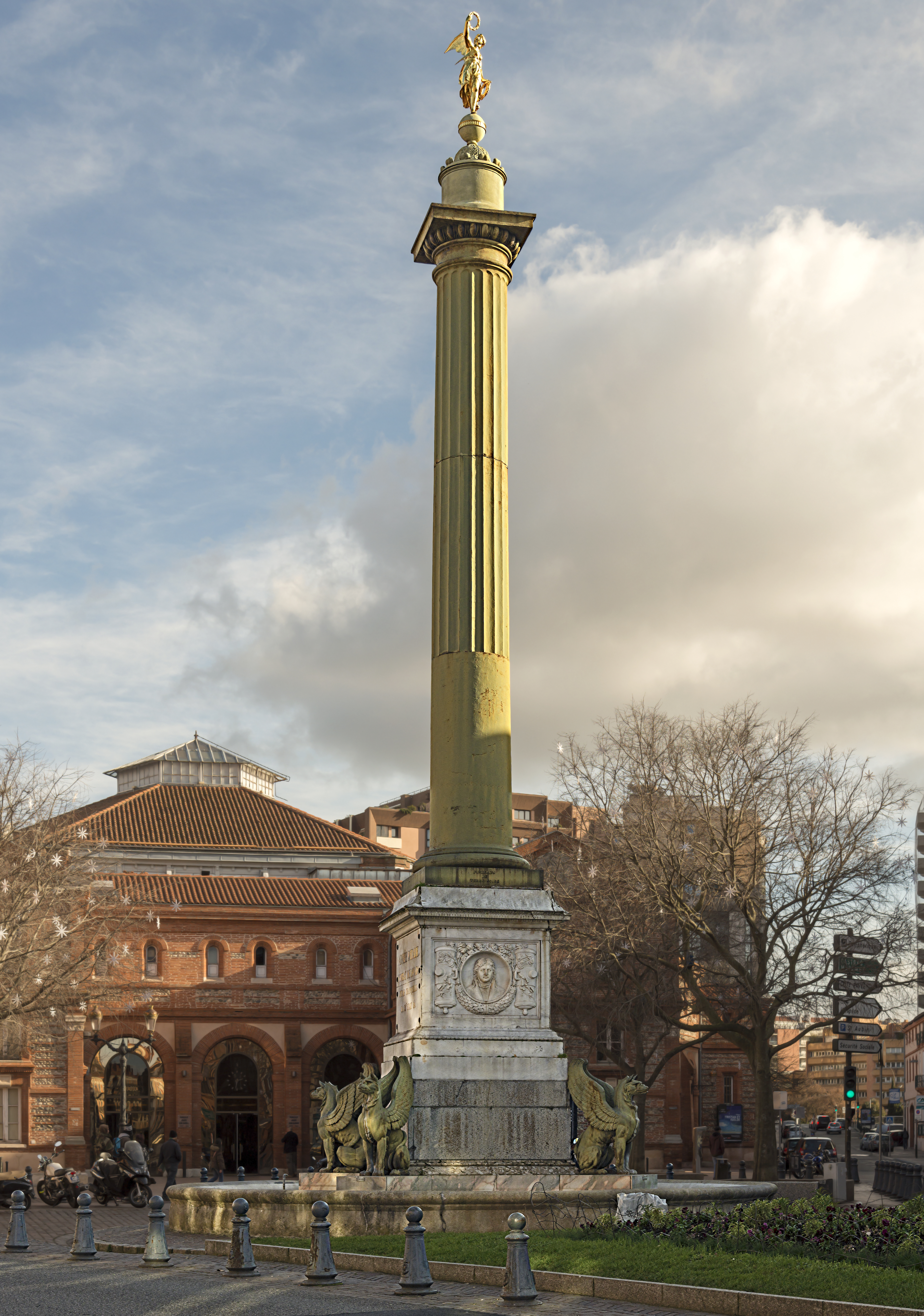
In 1834 the statue was installed at the top of the Dupuy column.

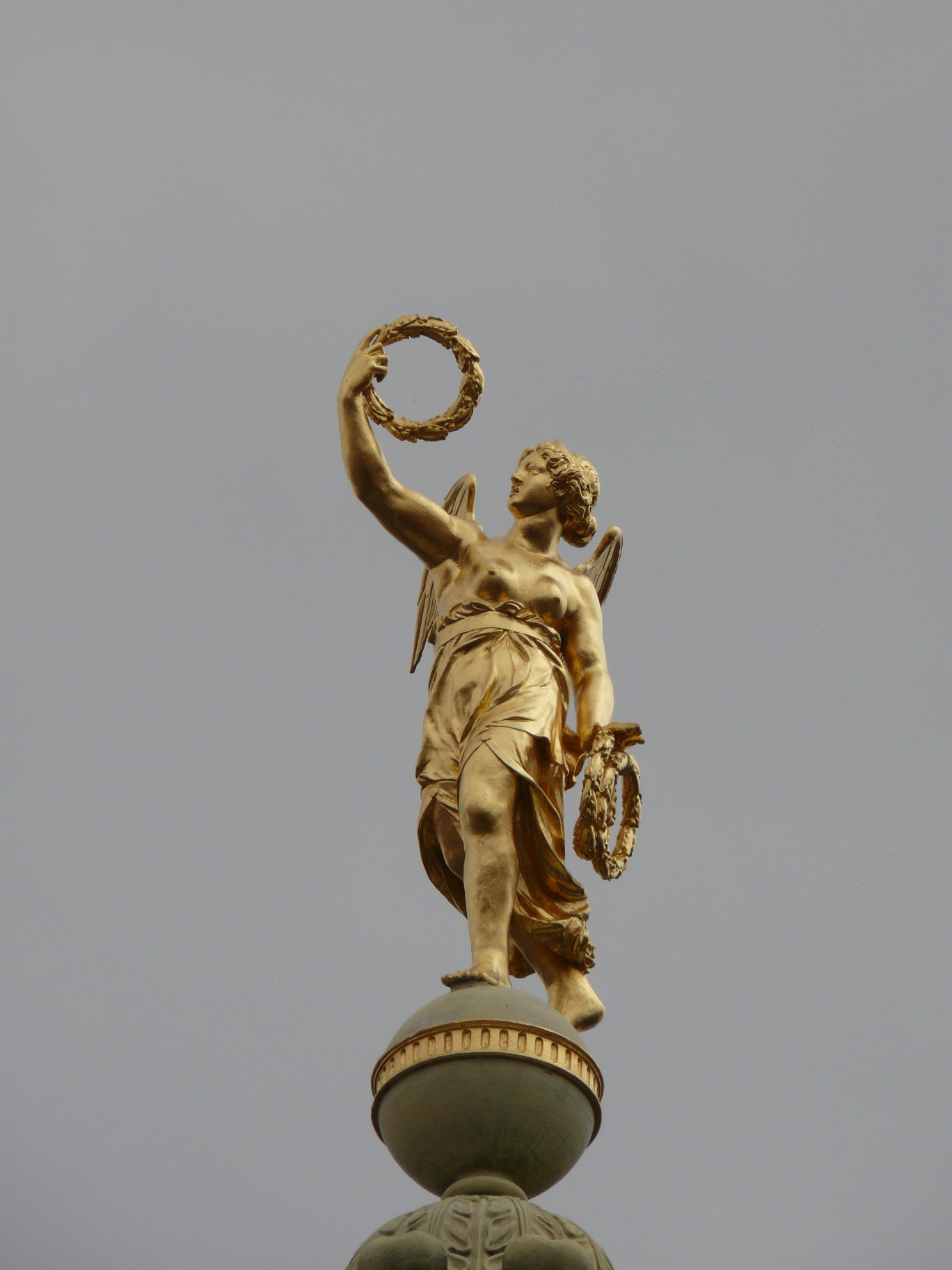
In 2005 it was replaced on the Dupuy column by a copy.

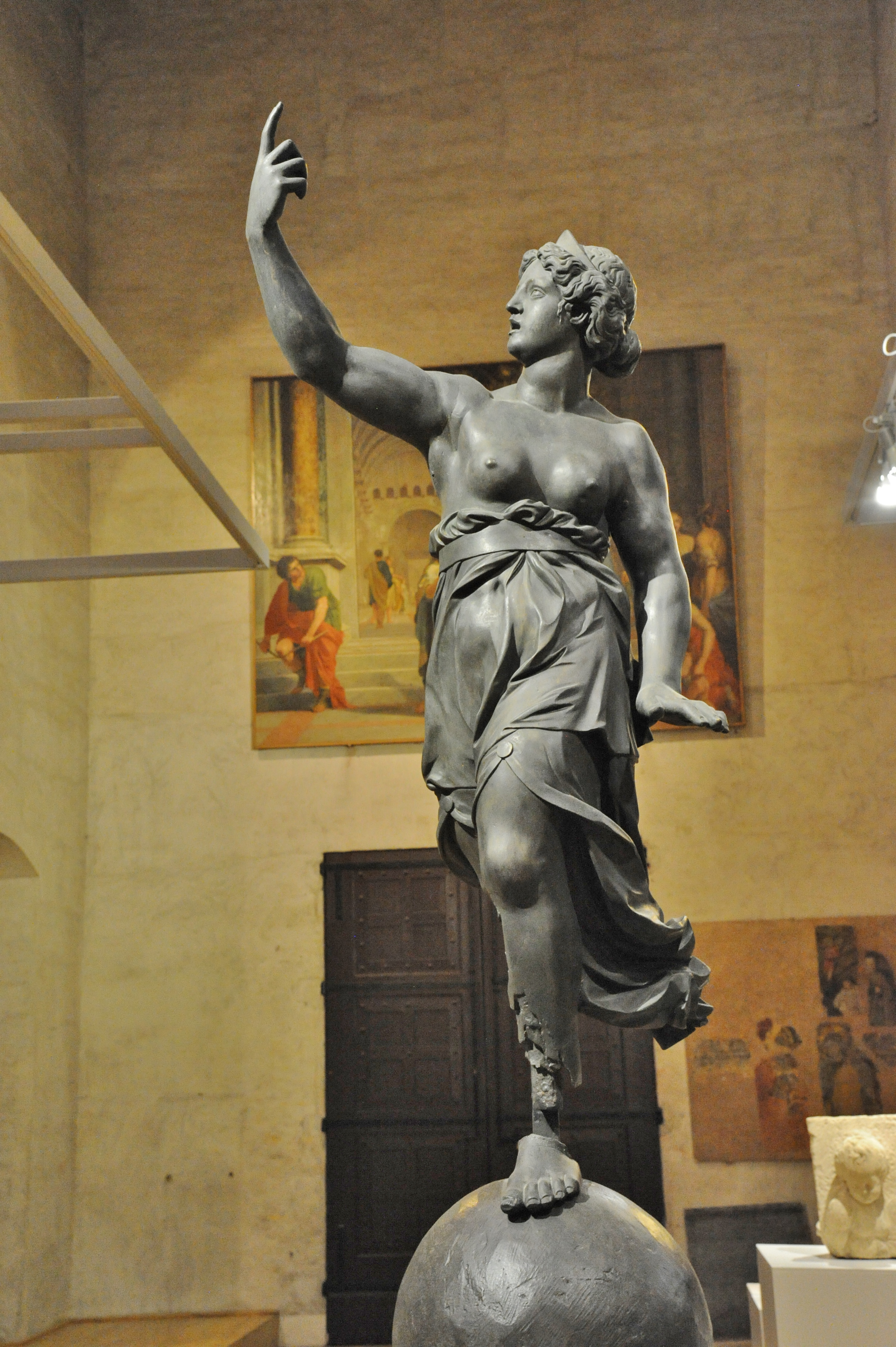
The original is now on display at the Musée des Augustins of Toulouse.

== An allegory with a political purpose ==
Beyond its artistic aspect, Lady Tholose is also distinguished by the political purpose behind its creation.

=== A symbol of the affirmation of the power of the capitouls against the royal institutions ===
The capitouls, the city's consuls who commissioned the work, had imagined Lady Tholose as an allegory to represent the city and the values that ensured its cohesion around the municipal magistrates. It was a question of affirming the power and seniority of the municipal institution as well as its legitimacy in defending the municipal freedoms and privileges conquered in previous centuries, while the royal power and the Parlement of Toulouse were exerting strong pressure to call them into question.

The choice of Lady Tholose to embody this allegory was significant: bronze as a material and especially the figure of the goddess Pallas (Minerva) as a model referred to Roman antiquity and more particularly to the Palladia Tolosa (Palladian Toulouse) evoked by the Latin poets Martial, Ausonius and Sidonius Apollinaris, the ancient Toulouse that the emperor Domitian had placed under the patronage of Pallas in the first century AD.

At the Renaissance, such an assertion of municipal power, and the personification of the city in the guise of a true ancient goddess, appear to have been without precedent in France. As early as 1534, the Municipal annals showed a first manifestation of this: the city is represented by the face of a young woman in the center of a medallion, next to the inscription "LIBERA THOLOSA". The dynamic humanist milieu of Toulouse was certainly at the origin of this evolution, which saw the capitouls abandon the traditional religious images in favor of a pagan figure with historical implications. For the jurisconsult and poet Jean de Boyssoné or the historiographers Nicolas Bertrand, Guillaume de La Perrière and Antoine Noguier, mastery of the historical narrative was the best asset of political power and they put their know-how at the service of municipal ambitions. Thus, the capitouls presented themselves as "decurions" sitting in a "Capitol", a formula that linked them directly to the city's Roman past and allowed them to claim a continuity of municipal privileges since the emperor Theodosius (although the municipal body was only created in 1147), i.e., an allegedly more ancient and venerable antiquity than that of the Crown of France.

The statue held a weather vane in its right hand and leaned with its left hand on a shield (now disappeared) with the arms of the city. On the shield were inscribed the letters CPQT MDL, that is to say Capitulum Populusque Tolosanum 1550 to, in the manner of the Roman SPQR, refer to the capitolate and the people of Toulouse.

=== An allegorical figure declined on other supports ===
The name and symbolism of Lady Tholose have been used on other media depicting allegories of Toulouse.

Depending on the chroniclers and historians, the same representation could be presented sometimes as Pallas and sometimes as Lady Tholose. If conceptually Pallas could be considered as a simple protector or inspirer of Toulouse, while Lady Tholose would be the representation of the city itself, a certain confusion exists between the various publications and it might seem vain, in the context of Toulouse, to always try to differentiate the goddess from the allegory of the city that she inspired.

Lady Tholose or Pallas: some examples of allegorical representations

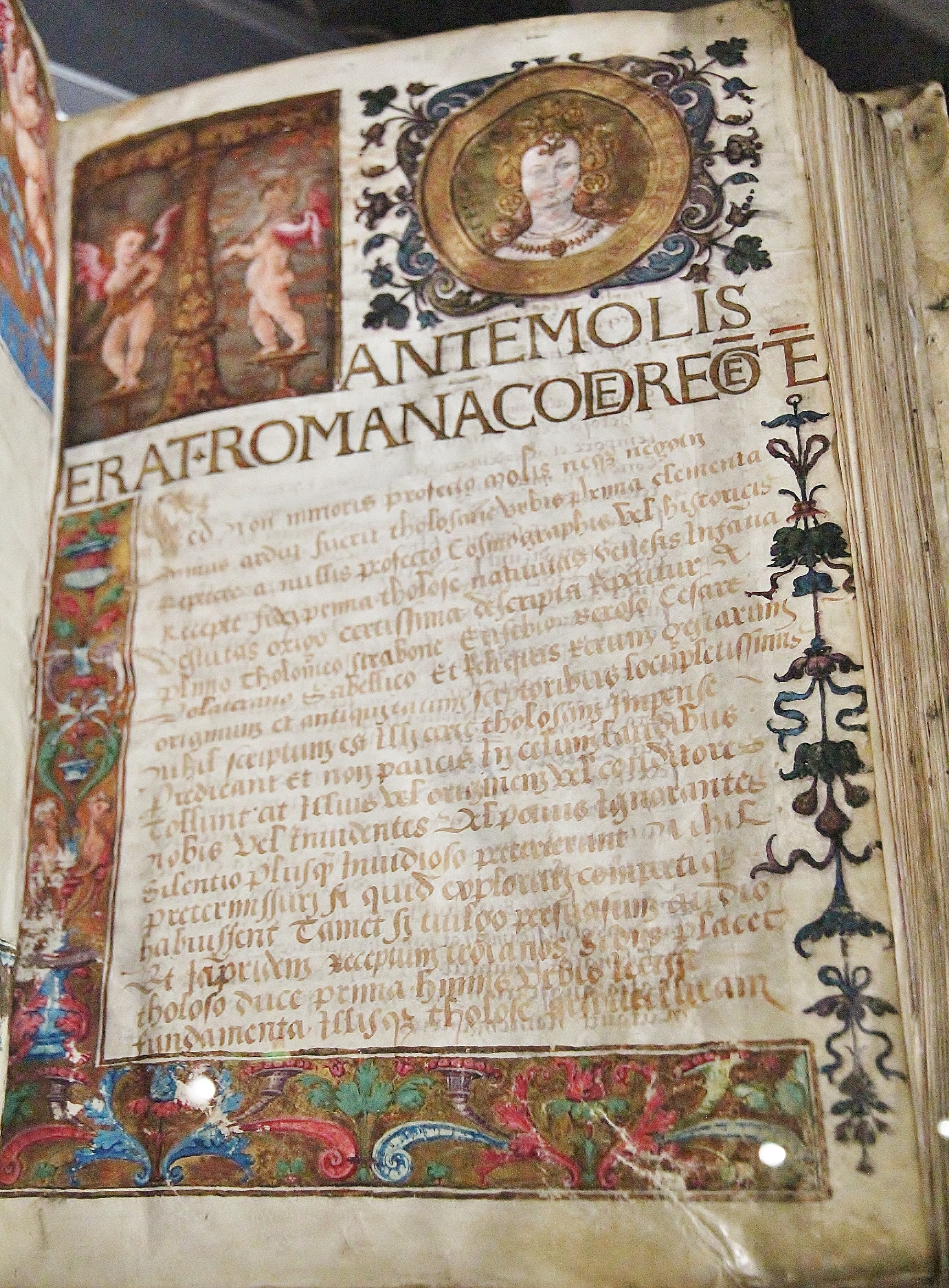
Annals of the City of Toulouse of 1534, representation in medallion. On the adjacent page appears the Latin inscription LIBERA THOLOSA (“Free Toulouse”), which reflects the privileged status the city enjoyed in managing its internal affairs during the Roman Empire.

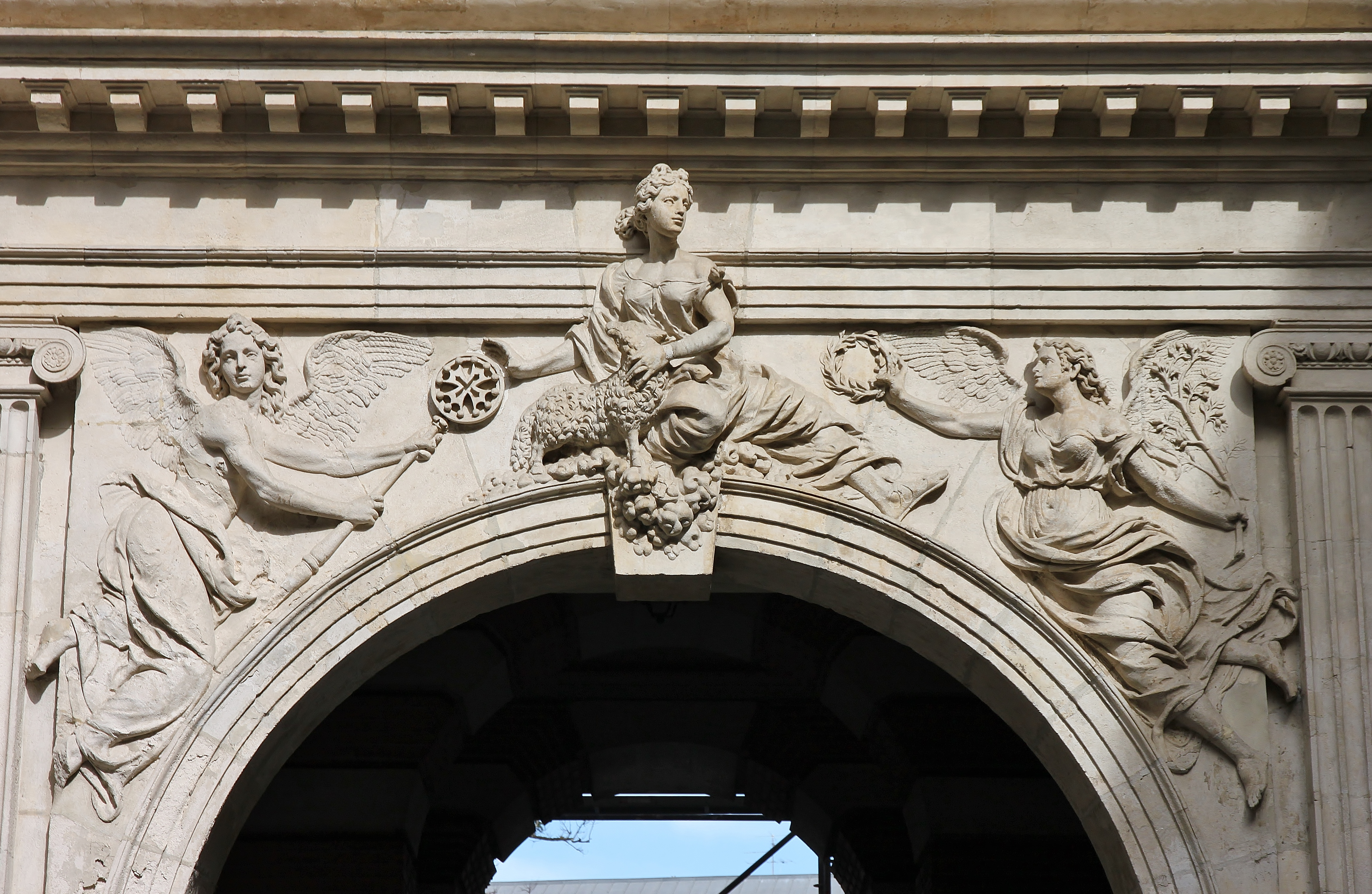
This sculpture by Nicolas Bachelier on a drawing by Jean Rancy (eastern portal of the Henri IV courtyard of the Capitole, 1546) evokes Lady Tholose and/or Pallas. It is shown with a lamb (element of the Toulouse coat of arms), whereas an owl was originally at the end of the staff which now bears an Occitan cross.

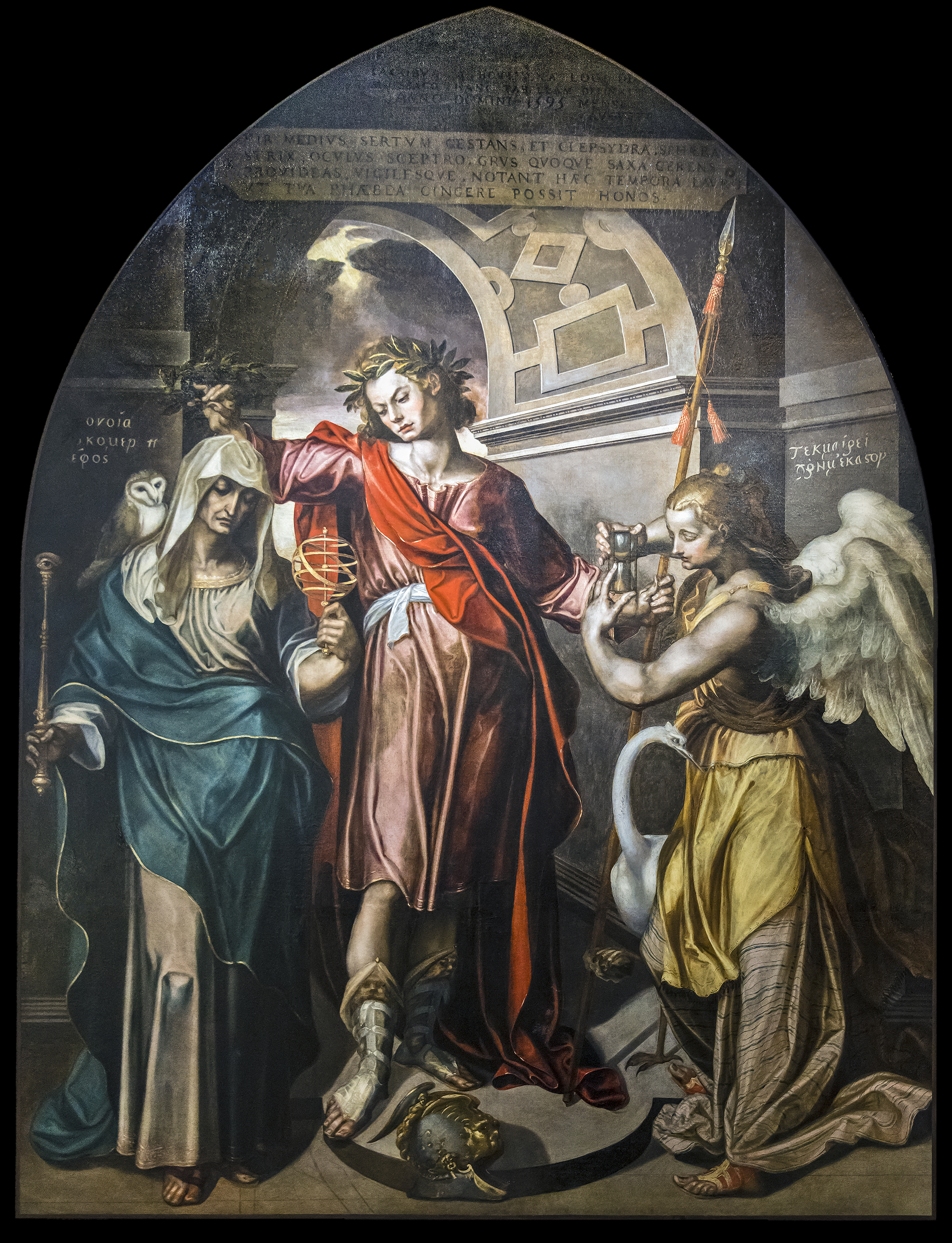
In the painting Providence, Honor and Vigilance, the painter Jacques Boulbène glorifies the moral virtues of the capitouls (1595) and chooses Pallas to embody Providence (identifiable by its owl).

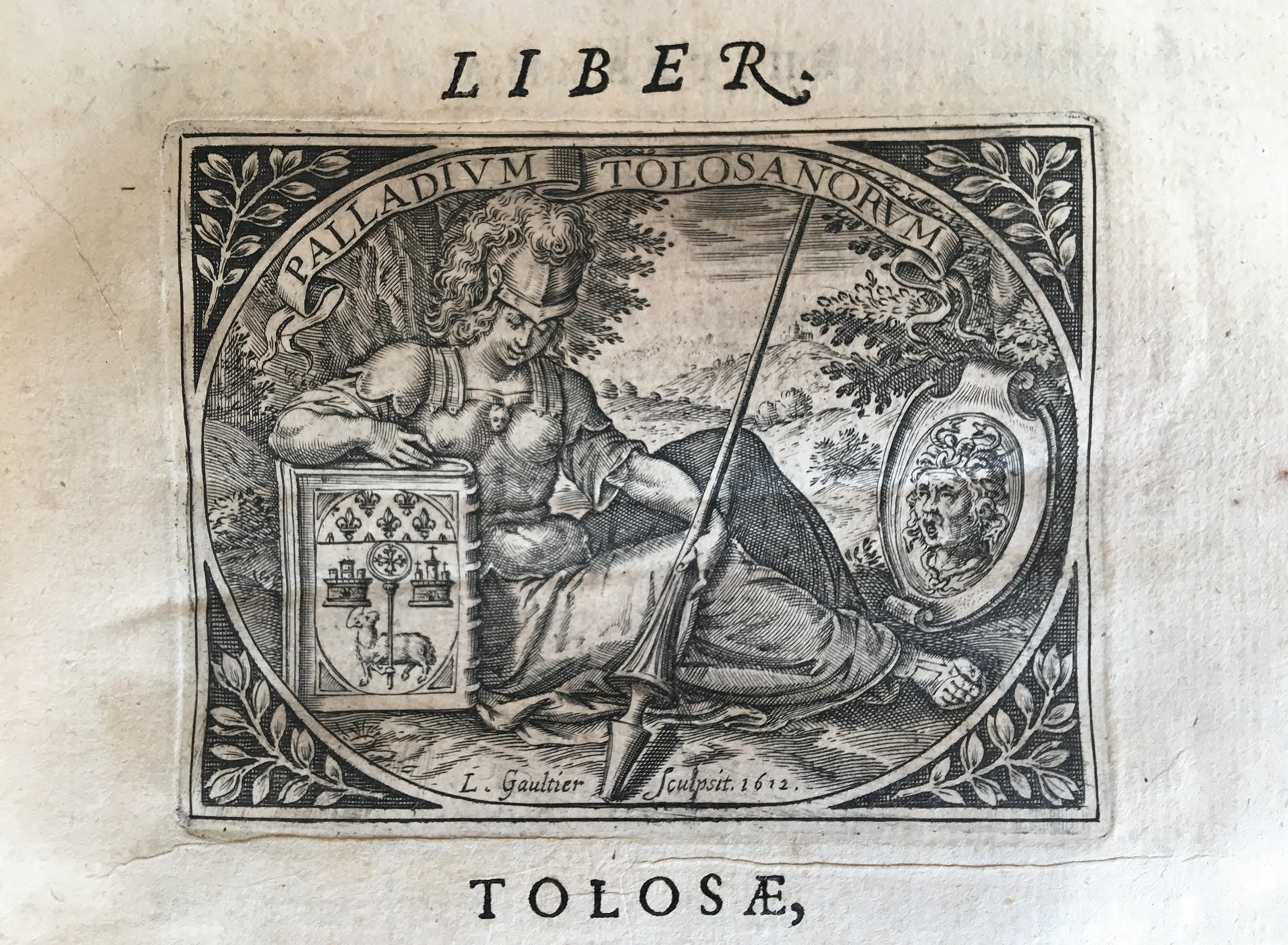
Mark of the Toulouse printer Raymond Colomiès (1612).

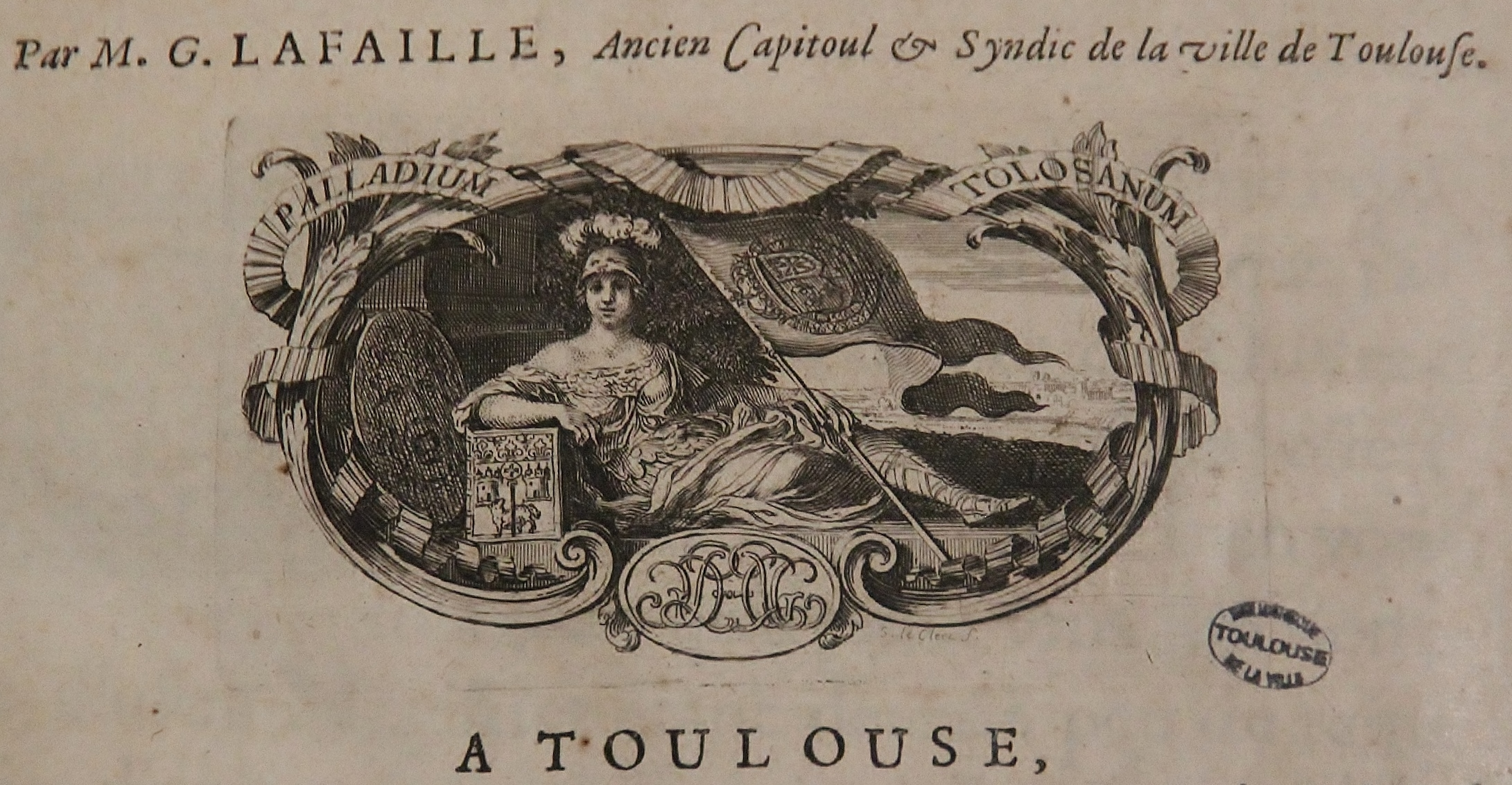
Annals of the city of Toulouse by Germain Lafaille (1687).

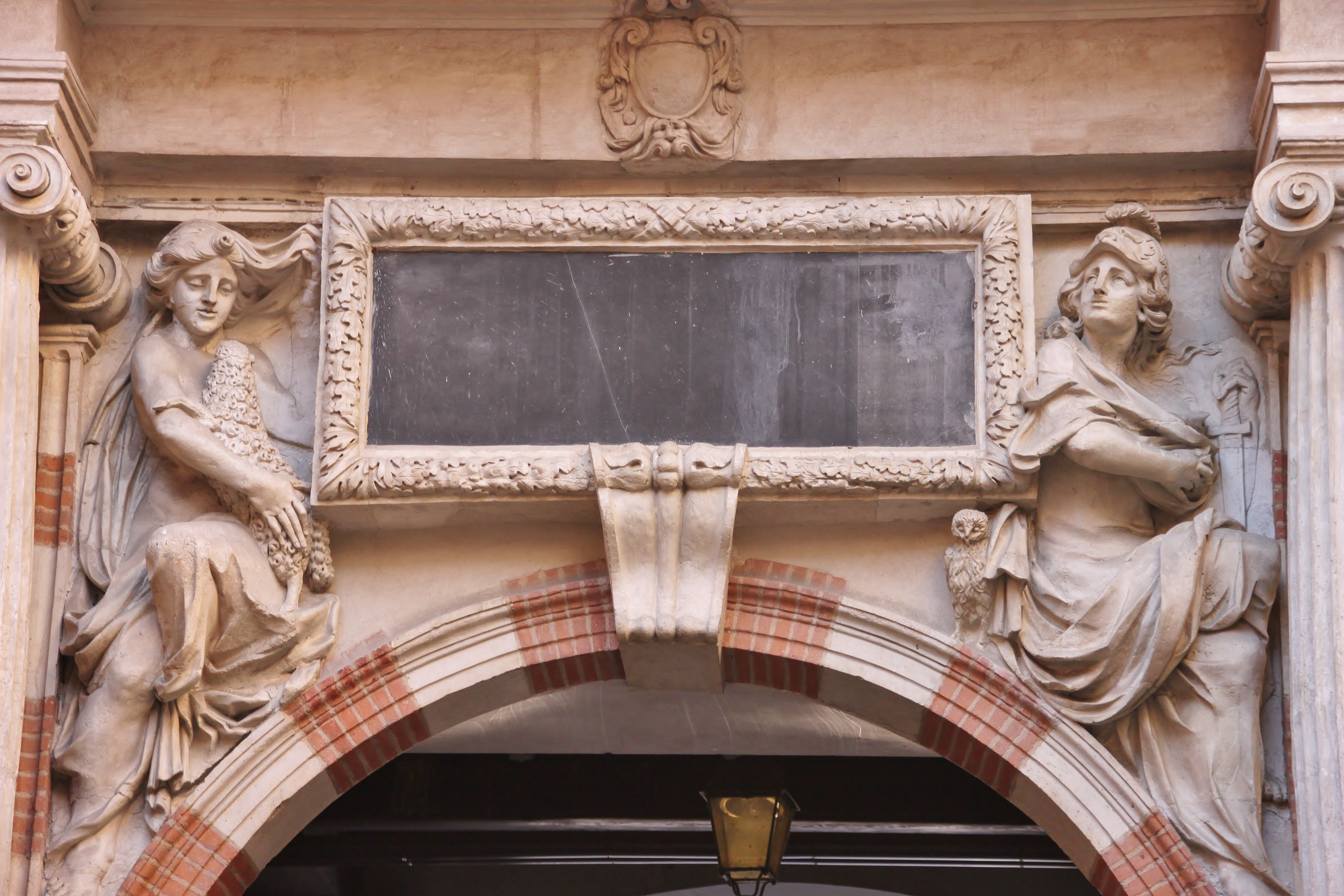
On the western portal of the Henri IV courtyard of the Toulouse Capitole, two sculpted figures embody Lady Tholose / Pallas (1678).

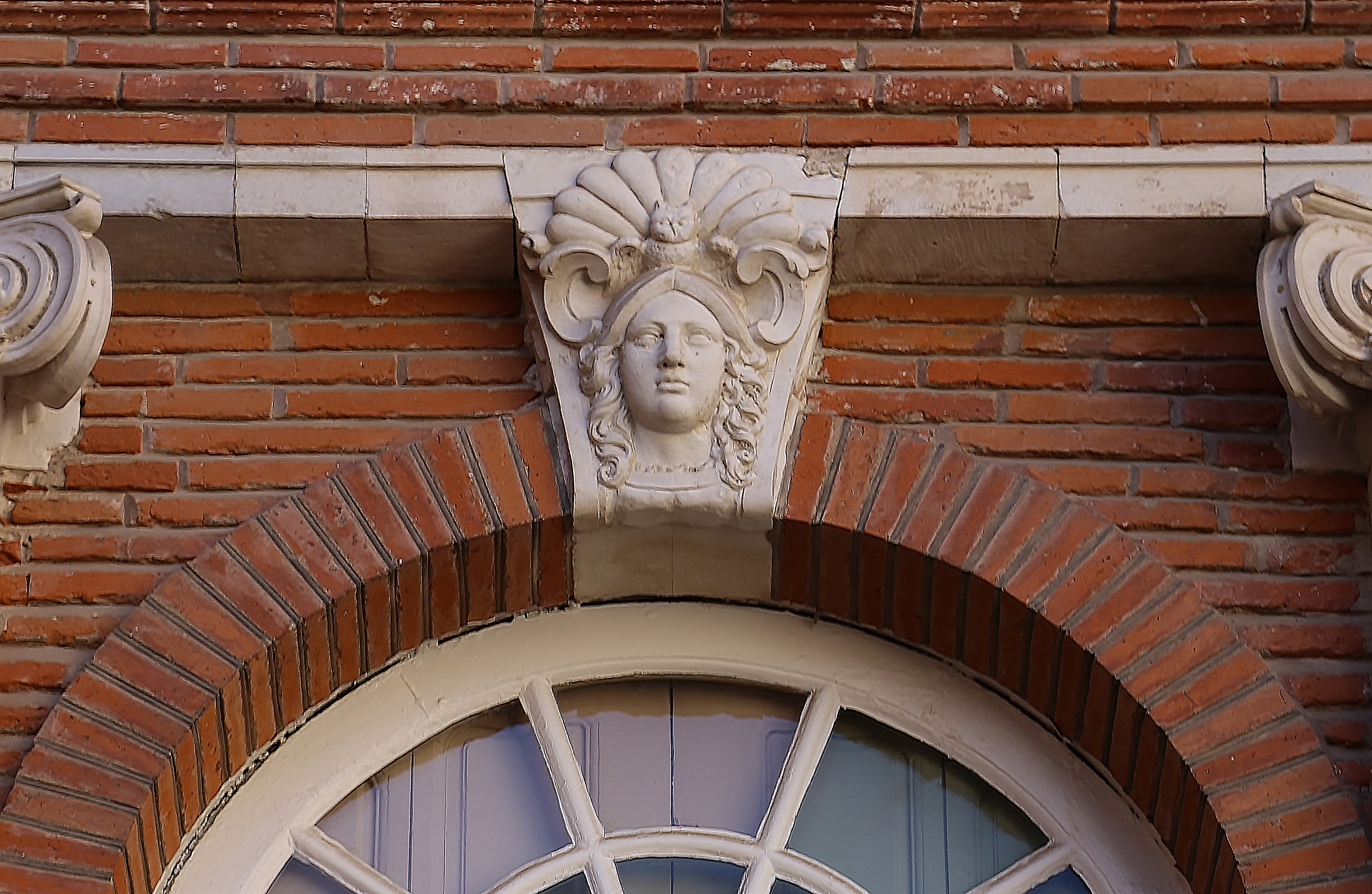
In the courtyard of a private mansion in Toulouse, representation of Pallas and the owl which is her attribute (18th century).

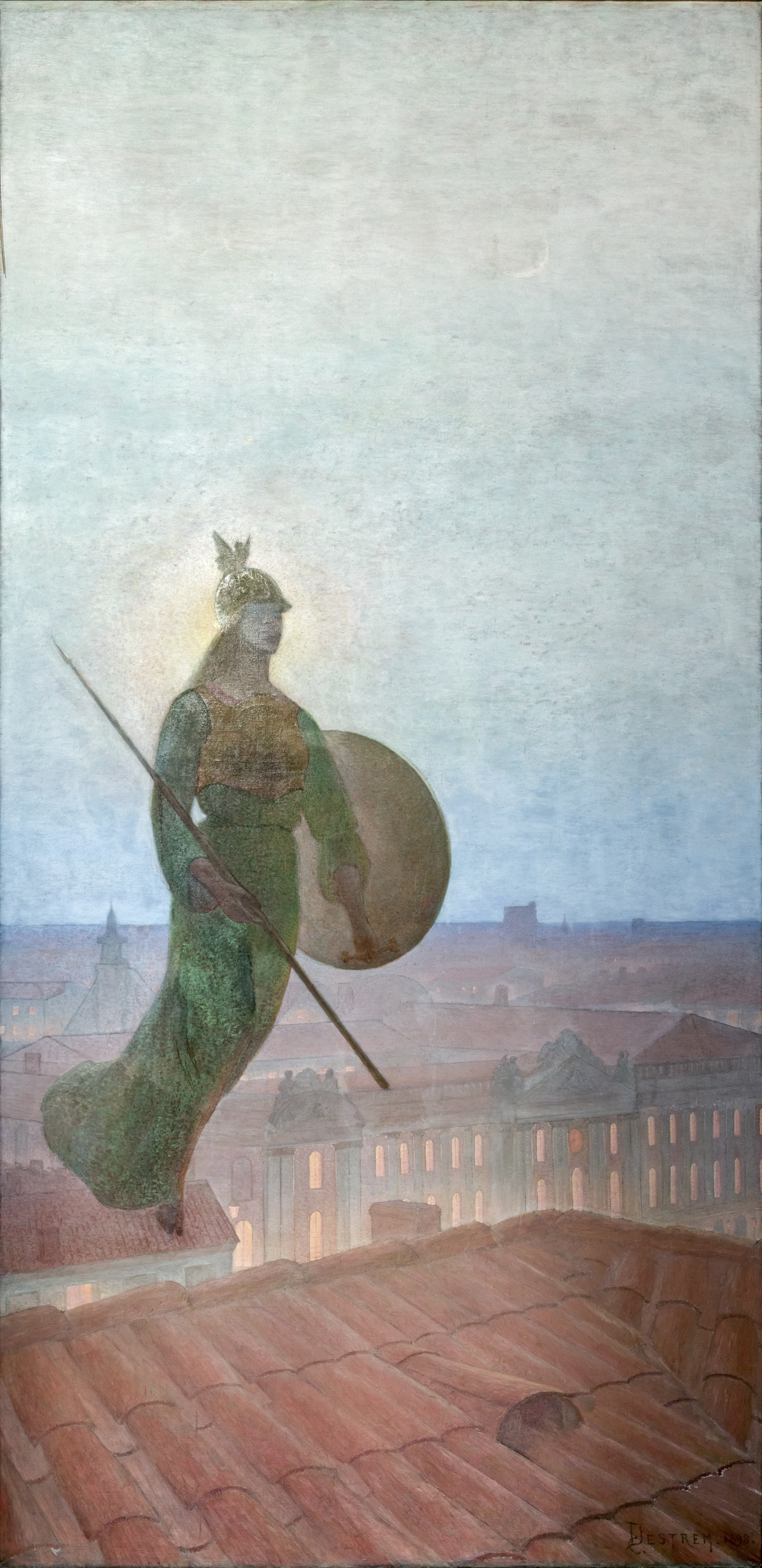
Minerva watching over Toulouse, Salle des Illustres du Capitole (1898).

== See also ==
- Capitoul
