= Gordon Collection =

The Gordon Collection (also known as the Douglas H. Gordon Collection) at the University of Virginia's Albert and Shirley Small Special Collections Library comprises some 1200 volumes of French books dating from the sixteenth through the 19th century. Over 600 were printed before 1600, and many retain their original bindings. The collection, which came to the university of Virginia in 1986, was the bequest of the late Douglas Huntly Gordon of Baltimore, a prominent Maryland attorney, former president of St. John's College in Annapolis, and recipient of the French Légion d'Honneur and Palmes Académiques. A Francophile since his undergraduate days at Harvard, Mr. Gordon was a notable American bibliophile.

== Contents ==
The approximately 600 Gordon books dating from the 16th century include literary works and titles pertaining to religion, philosophy, medicine, astronomy, travel and architecture. Together, they provide a remarkable window on the French Renaissance. The rarity of so many of the books, combined with the size and range of the collection, make it a treasure for Renaissance scholars from around the world, as well as those studying the early history of printing and the book arts. In fact, many of the volumes are counted among only a few surviving copies, and, in some cases, the Gordon book is the only known copy in the world. Among the rarest sixteenth-century titles in the collection, for example, are an illustrated edition of Marot's Blasons anatomiques du corps feminin …, published by Charles Langelier in Paris in 1543, and a little-known volume of Alciati's emblems, Les emblemes de M. Andre Alciat, traduits en ryme Francoise par Iean le Feure, published in Lyon by Jean de Tournes in 1549, with woodcuts attributed to Bernard Salomon.

Gordon Collection works include a hand-edited volume of Diderot's Encyclopedia, as well as 16th century works by Rabelais, Ronsard, Marguerite de Navarre, Montaigne, Louise Labe, Marot and several Books of Hours.

The collection includes one piece of music, a tenor part from Il primo libro de le canzoni franzese, published in Venice by Ottaviano Scotto in 1535, and for a long time thought lost, until rediscovered circa 2014.

== Digitization ==
The University of Virginia Library and the University of Virginia French Department established the digital access to the collection via the Renaissance in Print project. The first phase of this project (2003-2005) included digitizing some of the works and was funded by the Florence Gould Foundation . Funding from the National Endowment for the Humanities Preservation and Access Reference Materials Grant helped improve metadata and put in place additional access structures.
