= Denis Janot =

Parisian printer and bookseller

Denis Janot (also spelled Denys) (fl. 1529–1544) was a printer and bookseller from Paris, France, whose store was near Notre-Dame de Paris. Janot, who was born into a family of printers and booksellers and married into another such one, was notable for printing books in the vernacular, especially in the field of the humanities, and for commissioning illustrations for the books he printed. He is responsible for printing many of the notable classical authors as well as for contemporary ones, particularly in the matter of the Querelle des femmes, the contemporary discussion over the status of women.

== Biography ==
Denis Janot was the son of Jean Janot (fl. 1508–1522). Jean had married into a family business; his wife was Macée Trepperel, whose parents were printers and booksellers. He and his wife printed books in the vernacular to appeal to a wide audience; two of his sons, Denis and Simon, took up the same trade. Denis started in 1529, at first in the Palais de Justice, and worked for a while with Alain Lotrian. He set up his own shop in 1534, and moved near Notre-Dame de Paris. After his death in December 1544, his widow, Jeanne de Marnef (who also came from a family of printers and booksellers), continued the business alone for a year and a half. She then married merchant printer Estienne Groulleau, who joined her in running the business, though she focused, after a while, almost exclusively on printing.

Like his father, Denis Janot printed works in the vernacular, though specializing in "poetry, moral philosophy and history." According to Stephen Rawles, his particular contribution was printing vernacular texts with "some of the high aesthetic standards" that the humanist printers of the time employed in printing Greek and Latin texts. He was granted the status of royal printer in 1543; a catalog from around that time lists 163 books, only 14 of which were in Latin, and many of his translations were of Latin classical authors (including two different translations of Cicero's Somnium Scipionis). Of special note are the many books he printed pertaining to the contemporary Querelle des femmes.

One of his usual practices was to illustrate the books he printed, and he was one of the earliest French printers of emblem books – he published Guillaume de La Perrière's Le Théâtre des bons engins in an undated edition which can be ascribed to 1540; 1534 is the date for the first emblem book in French. Janot printed many of the important books of his time, including the Roman de la Rose and Christine de Pizan's The Treasure of the City of Ladies. Rawles claims that his editions of works by Clément Marot were among his most important printings of French poetry.
