= Albert Flamen =

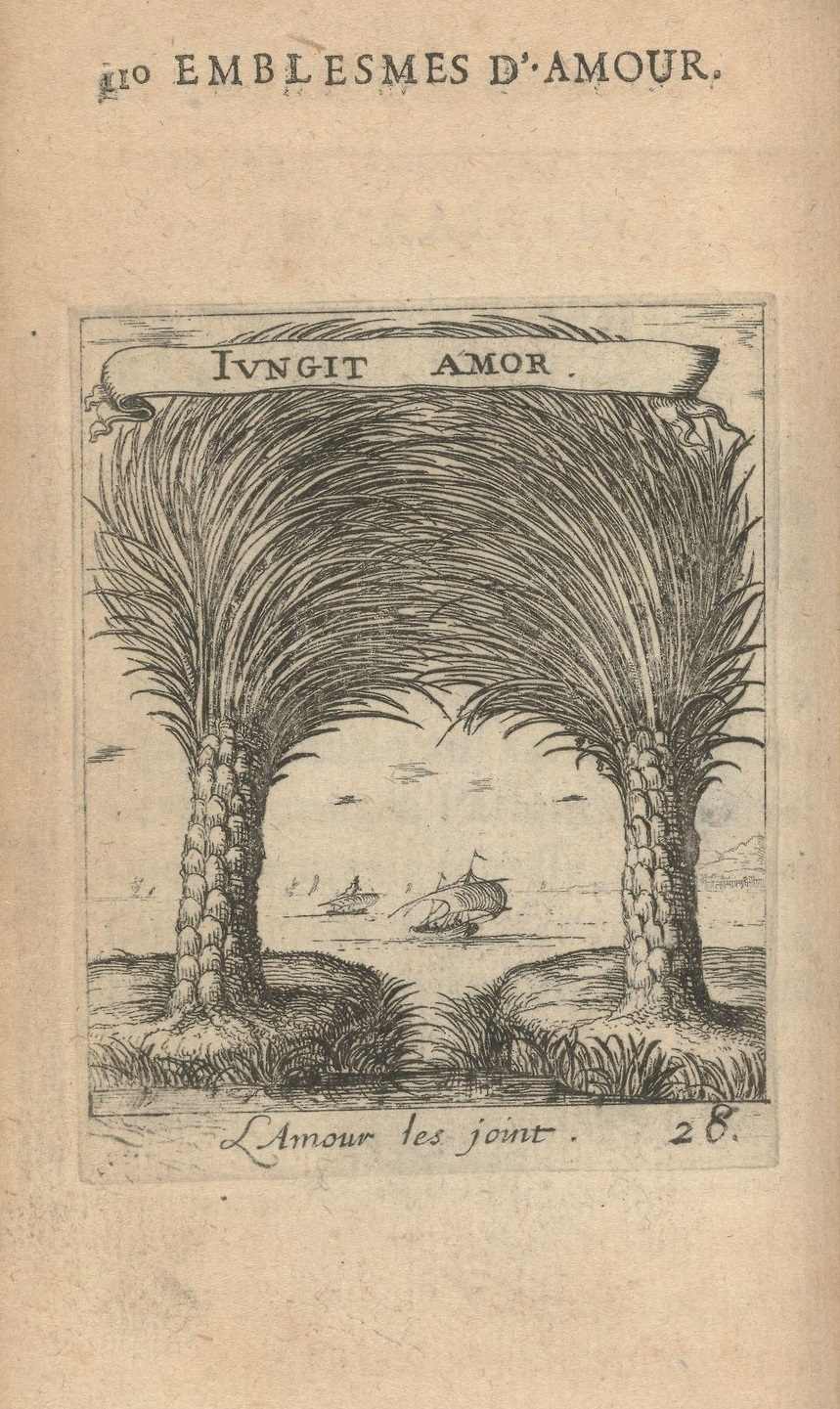
'Love unites them', from Devises et emblesmes d’amour moralisez (1672)

Albert Flamen (c. 1620 – after 1669) was a Flemish engraver, painter, and tapestry designer. He was active in Paris, where he worked mainly as an illustrator on numerous publications.

== Life ==
Few details about Flamen's life and training are known with certainty. The artist is believed to have been of Flemish descent, but his known activity is documented only in France, where his prints were published in Paris. The most comprehensive recent study of Flamen contends on the basis of biographical data drawn from the Fichier Laborde housed in the Bibliothèque Nationale in Paris that in all likelihood he was born some time before 1620. The Netherlands Institute for Art History places his birth date and place at around 1620 in Bruges.

== Work ==
Flamen was a prolific engraver who produced works for a number of prominent patrons including Guillaume Tronson, Advisor to the King, Gilles Foucquet, son of Nicolas Fouquet and Advisor to the King, the Marquis d’Illiers de Chantemelle and Monsieur de Sève, abbot of the Isle and chaplain of the king. These patrons tended to be closely allied to the Royalist cause during the struggles known collectively as "La Fronde".

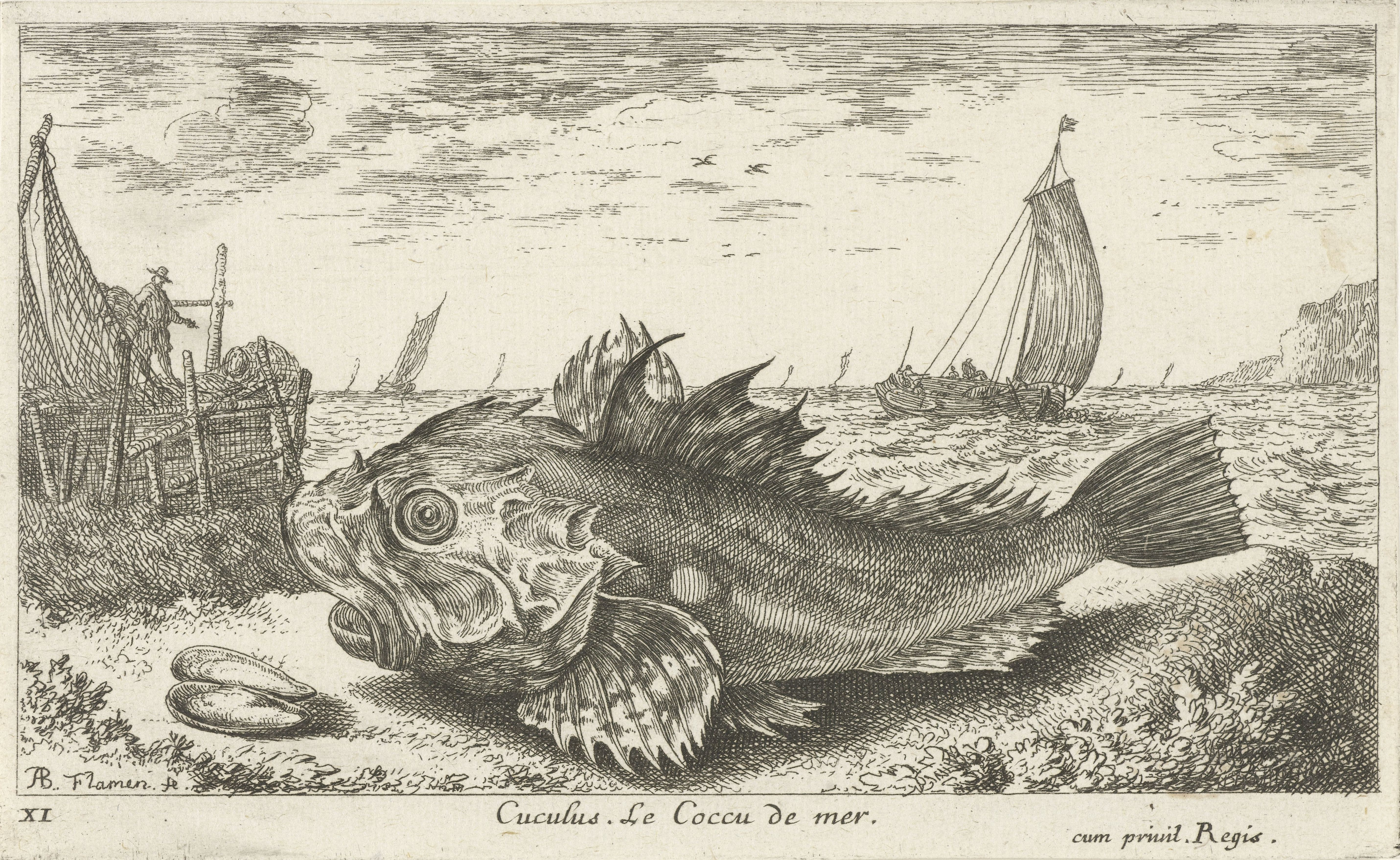
Cuculus. Le Coccu de mer from 'Diverses espèces de poissons de mer'

He added drypoint and burin to his etchings which he executed with a fine, neat and light line, and which offer an overall effect similar to the manner of Wenceslaus Hollar.”

Flamen's best-known prints are his French landscape etchings and his studies of both salt-water and fresh-water fish and of birds. He also engraved the illustrations for a number of emblem books, including the anonymous Devises et emblemes d'amour often attributed to him but of which he denied being the author (first published in Paris, 1648), Augustin Chesneau's Orpheus Eucharisticus (Paris, 1657) and Adrien Gambart's La Vie symbolique du bienheureux François de Sales (Paris, 1664). Most of his works were created in series published in small oblong books, typically consisting of 12 prints. The influence of Jacques Callot is clearly discernible. Flamen created also several prints for Jacobus van Merlen, an Antwerp engraver. Flamen is estimated to have created about 625 items, of which perhaps 40% are emblems.

The Rijksmuseum and the British Museum hold extensive collections of his prints. The Louvre Museum (referring to the artist as: Aellert Flamen) has a number of his drawings which consist mainly of studies of animals and a marine drawing.

Flamen also painted a few portraits and produced some designs for the Gobelins Manufactory.

== Works ==
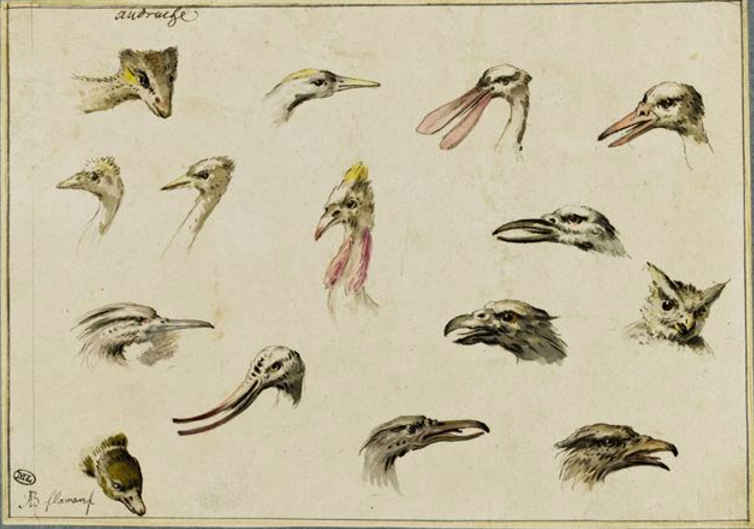
Study of 15 Heads of different Birds

- Devises et emblesmes d'amour moralisez. Gravez par Albert Flamen, Peintre demeurant au Faux-bourg S. Germain, ruë des Fossoyeurs. Paris: chez la veuve Jean Rémy, 1648.
- Les dix commandements de Dieu. Les cinq commandements de l'Église. 1648, s.p.
- Devises et emblesmes d'amour moralisez. Gravez par Albert Flamen, Peintre demeurant au Faux-bourg S. Germain, ruë des Fossoyeurs. 1648. Paris: chez Samuel Margat, 1650.
- Plan de Paris: rive gauche. Paris, 1651.
- Devises et emblesmes d'amour moralisez. Gravez par Albert Flamen. 1648. Paris: chez Olivier de Varennes, 1653.
- Devises et emblesmes d'amour morasisez [sic]. Gravez par Albert Flamen. 1648. Paris: chez Olivier de Varennes, 1653.
- Le jansénisme foudroyé. 1653.
- Devises et emblesmes d'amour moralisez. 1653. Paris: chez Olivier de Varennes. Et les Figures se vendent, chez Louis Boissevin, 1658.
- Diversæ Avium Specie, studisissime ad vitam delineatæ Per AB Flamen. Paris: Van Merlen, 1659.
- Icones Diversorum Piscium tum maris tum amnium. Ab Alberto Flamen ad vivum delineati, et in æs ab eodem artifitiose Incisi. Cum privilegio Regis 1664. Et in Lucem editi venduntur apud van Merlen, Parisiis in via Iacobea, sub signo urbis Antwerpiæ. 1664. van Merlen, Paris.
- Devises et emblesmes d'amour moralisez. 1653. Paris: chez Gervais Clouzier, 1666.

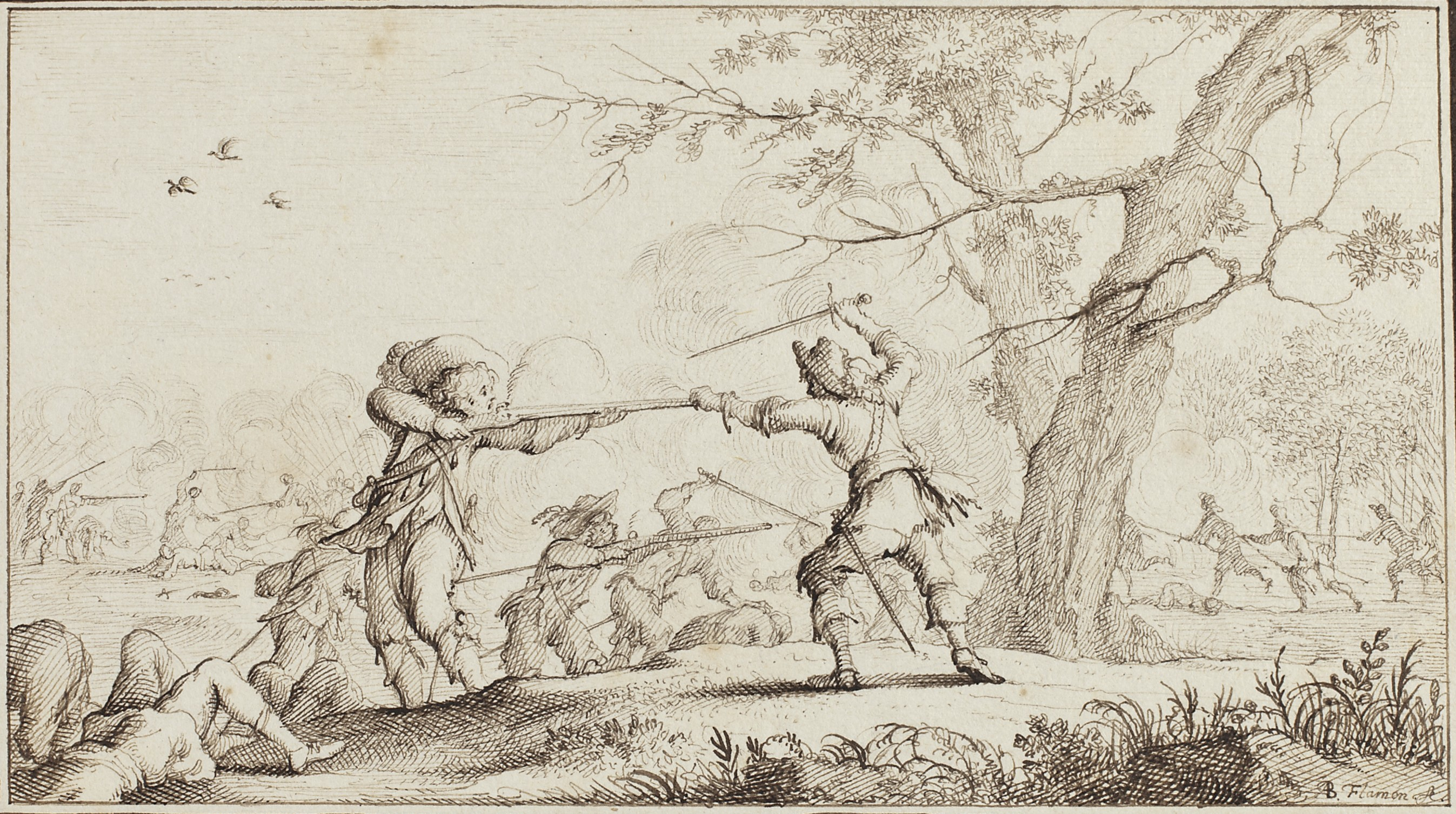
Ink drawing. Footsoldiers in forest terrain, Skokloster Castle, Sweden.

- Devises et emblesmes d'amour, moralisez. Gravés par Albert Flamen, Peintre. Paris: chez Estienne Loyson, 1672.
- Devises et emblesmes d'amour moralisez, gravés a Paris par Albert Flamen Peintre. Paris: chez Estienne Loyson, 1672. Les recueils d'emblèmes et les traités de physionomie de la Bibliothèque Interuniversitaire de Lille, 7. Paris: Aux Amateurs de Livres, 1989.
- Diverses espèces de poissons d'eau douce, dédiées à Monsieur, Monsieur Fouquet, Fils de Monseigneur le Procureur General, Surintendant des Finances et Ministre d'Estat, Par son tres-humble serviteur AB. Flamen., n.d.
- Diverses espèces de poissons de mer, Dessignés et gravés après le naturel Par Albert Flamen Peintre, Et par luy desdies A Messire Guillaume Tronson, Conseiller du Roy en ses Conseils. n.d.
- Diverses espèces de poissons tant de Mer que d'Eeau [sic] douce, dédiées à Monsieur le marquis d'Illiers, de Chantemelle, Baron de Beaumont, Aigresoude, Griesche, et autres lieux, &c. Par son tres-humble serviteur AB. Flamen. Paris: Iaques Lagniet, n.d.
- Livre d'oyseaux dédié à Messire Gilles Foucquet Conseiller du Roy au Parlement de Paris, Gravés et dessignés au naturel: Par Albert Flamen. Avec privilege du Roy. Drevet [?], n.d.
- Veuës et Païsages du Chasteau de Longuetoise et des environs, Dédiés a Mr de Seve, Abbé de l'Isle. n.d.
- Livre de Paÿsages à dessiner de J. Callot. [Paris], n.d.
- Paisages dessignes après le naturel aux environs de Paris et gravés Par Albert Flamen Peintre. Dediez A Messire Guillaume Tronson Con.er du roy en ses con.ls Secrétaire ordinaire du Cabinet de sa Majesté. Paris: chez Pierre Mariette, ru St Jacques a l'esperance; chez l'Auteur au faubourg Sainct Germain derriere Sainct Sulpice ruë des fossoyeurs, n.d.
- Vie et Martyre de S. André. n.d.
- "Disposition de la Milice de Paris lors quelle parut deuant leurs Majes, entre le Bois de Vincennes et la d.te ville le 23.e du mois d'Aoust de l'année 1660 trois jours avant L'Entrée"
- Livre d'oyseaux dédié à Messire Gilles Foucquet Conseiller du Roy au Parlement de Paris, Gravés et dessignés au nature: Par Albert Flamen. Drevet [?], n.d.

Works for which Flamen produced the engravings

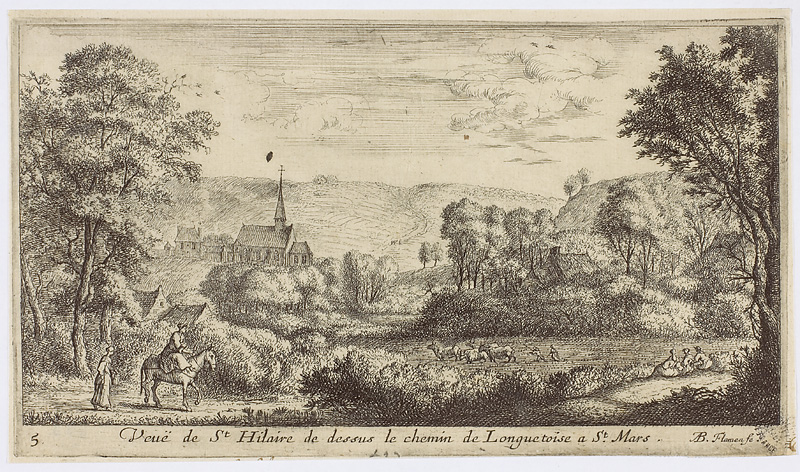
View of St Hilaire from the road from Longetoise to St Mars

- Augustin Chesneau, Orpheus Eucharisticus, sive Deus absconditus humanitatis illecebris illustriores Mundi partes ad se pertrahens, ultroneas arcanæ maiestatis adoratrices. Paris: Florentin Lambert, 1657.
- Adrien Gambart, La Vie symbolique du bienheureux François de Sales, Evesque et Prince de Geneve. Comprise sous le voile de 52. Emblemes, qui marquent le caractere de ses principales vertus, avec autant de Meditations, ou Reflexions pieuses, pour exciter les ames Chrestiennes & Religieuses à l'amour & à la pratique des mesmes vertus. Paris: Aux frais de l'Auteur, 1664.
- Adrien Gambart, Vida simbolica del Glorioso S. Francisco de Sales, Obispo de Geneva, dividida en dos partes, y escrita en cinquenta y dos Emblemas. Trans. Francisco Cubillas Don-Yague. Madrid: Antonio Roman, 1688.
- Augustin Lubin, Orbis Augustinianus sive conventuum ordinis eremitarum Sancti Augustini chorographica et topographica descriptio. Paris: apud Petrum Baudouyn, 1659.
- Augustin Lubin, « Topographia Augustiniana sive Prospectus conventuum ordinis eremitarum Sancti Augustini ». Orbis Augustinianus sive conventuum ordinis eremitarum Sancti Augustini chorographica et topographica descriptio. Paris: apud Petrum Baudouyn, 1659.
