= Daniel Stolz von Stolzenberg =

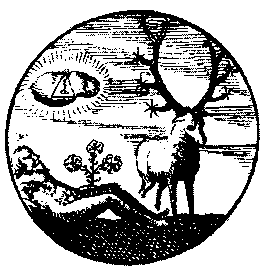
From the early 17th century Hermetic Garden

Daniel Stolz von Stolzenberg (Note: His name is often given as 'von Stolcenberg', i.e. from Stolzenberg, or 'von Stolcenbeerg'.) (Latin: Daniel Stolcius; 1600–1660) was a Czech medical doctor and writer on alchemy, a pupil of Michael Maier in Prague.

He is known for his 1624 emblem book Viridarium Chymicum, a significant anthology with sources in previous collections. (Note: According to John Manning, The Emblem (2002), Claude-François Menestrier's classification of Emblêmes Chymiques should apply to the book.) It was followed in 1627 by the Hortulus Hermeticus.
