= Achille Bocchi =

Italian writer (1488–1562)

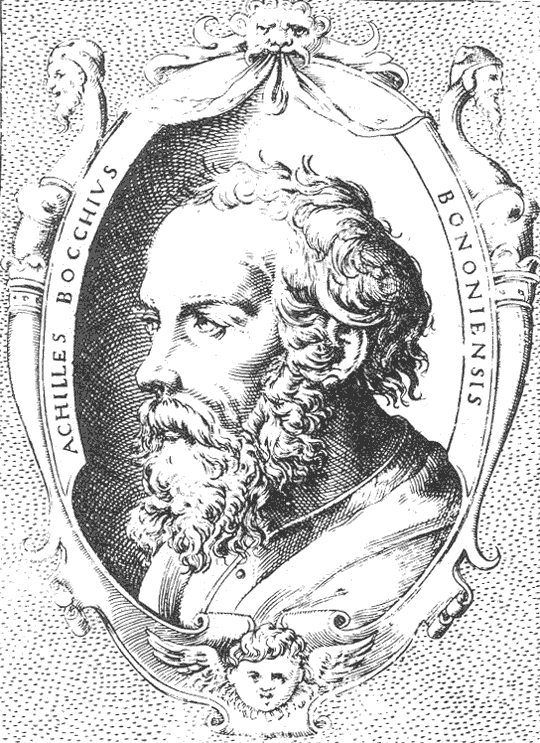
Achille Bocchi.

Achille Bocchi (Achilles Bocchius) (1488 – 6 November 1562), of Bologna, was an Italian humanist writer, emblematist, historian and lector in Greek, poetry and "humanae litterae" at the University of Bologna. He is best known for his emblem book Symbolicarum quaestionum de universo genere from 1555, which "takes as its subject the whole of universal knowledge: physics, metaphysics, theology, dialectic, Love, Life and Death, packaging them under the veil of fables and myths." It borrowed from Francesco Colonna. The title page put it in the tradition of serio ludere. Bocchi was a friend of Giovanni Pierio Valeriano Bolzanio, and his work is related to Valeriano's Hieroglyphica.

Bocchi was the leader of an informal academy, the Accademia Bocchiana, under the protection of Cardinal Alessandro Farnese, nephew of the Farnese Pope Paul III. For Bocchi Giacomo Barozzi da Vignola, recently returned from Fontainebleau, designed the Palazzo Bocchi, Bologna, about 1545 (built 1545-55); for the façade Bocchi provided two inscriptions, one in Latin, the other in Hebrew, that run along the rusticated base of the front.
