= Jan Harmenszoon Krul =

Dutch Catholic playwright (1601–1646)

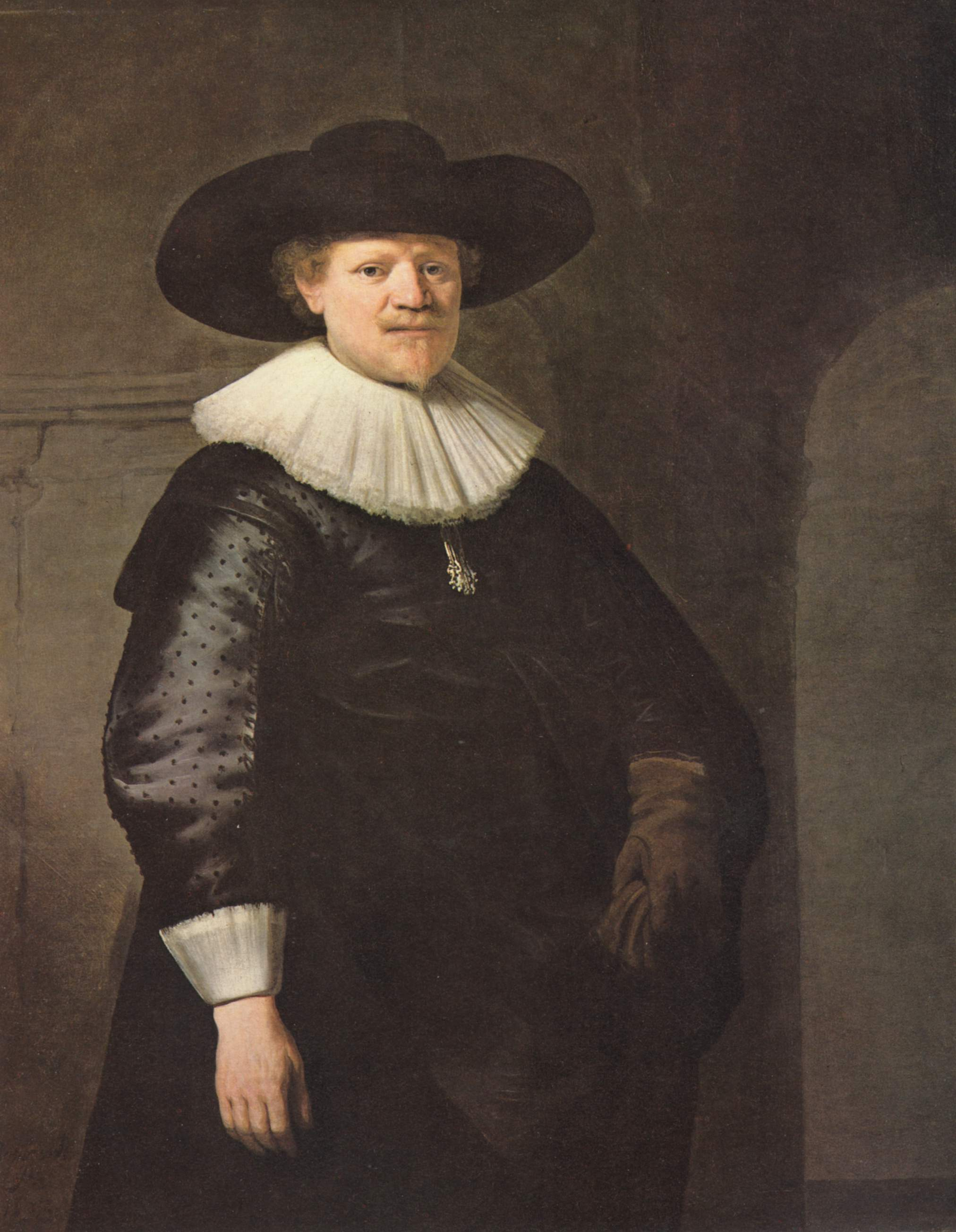
Rembrandt's portrait of Krul

Jan Harmenszoon Krul (1601–1646) was a Dutch Catholic playwright. His portrait was painted in 1633 by Rembrandt. Krul founded the Amsterdamsche Musijck Kamer, devoted to the cultivation of music drama.

== Works ==
- The emblem book Minne-spiegel ter Deughden (Amsterdam, 1639)
- The Pastoral Music-Play of Juliana and Claudiaen.
