= Emblem book =

Book collecting allegorical illustrations with explanatory text

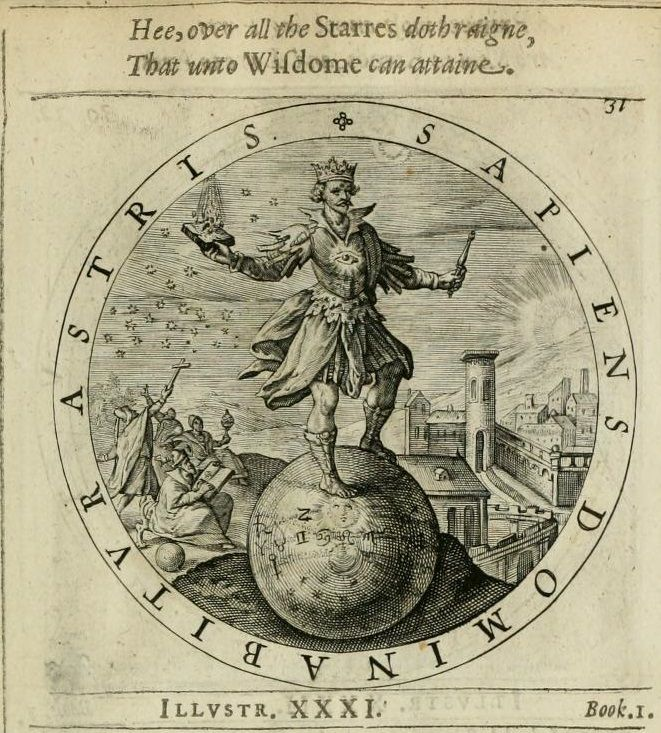
Wisdom - from George Wither's Book of Emblems (London 1635)

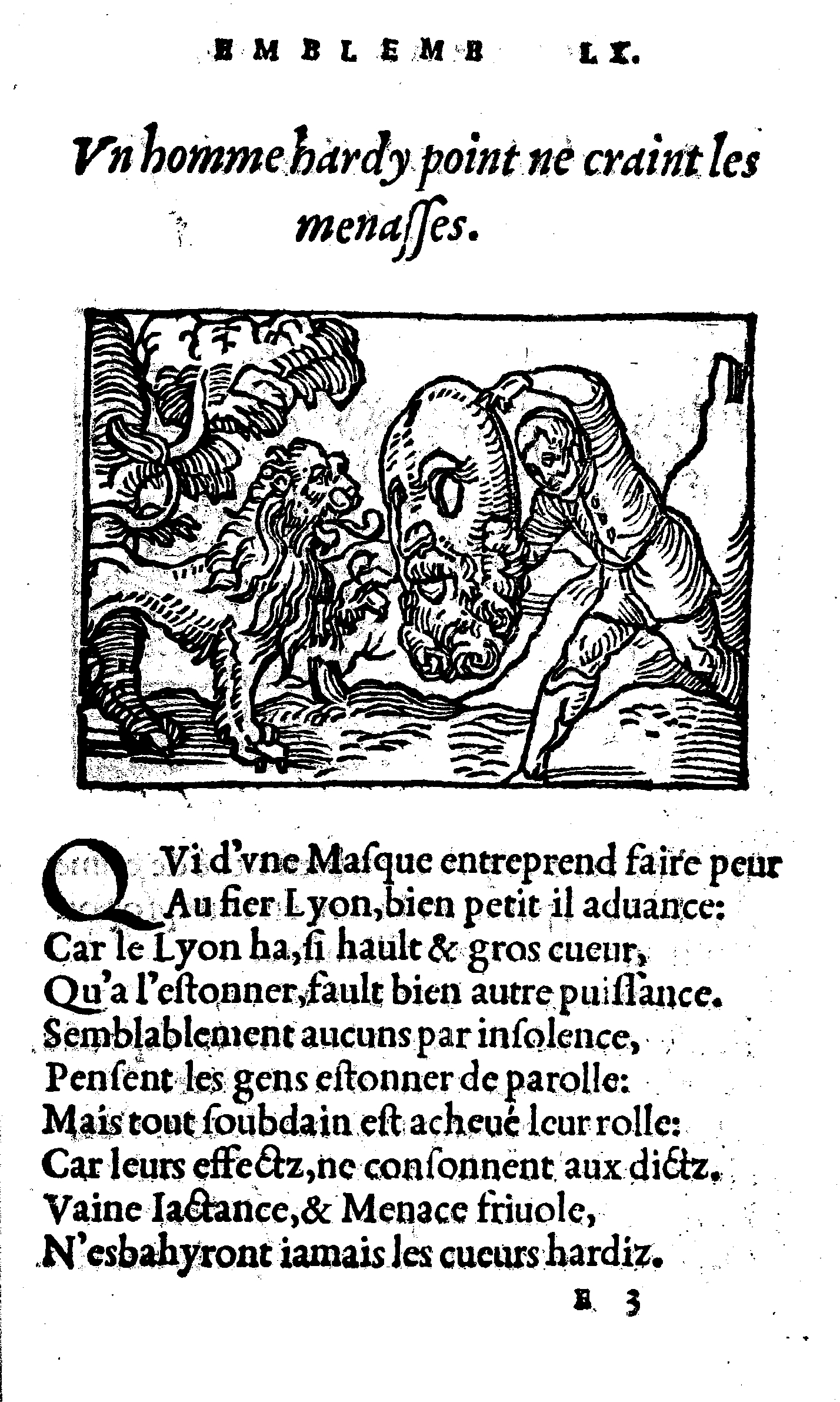
Woodcut from Guillaume de La Perrière, Le Théâtre des bons engins, 1545

An emblem book is a book collecting emblems (allegorical illustrations) with accompanying explanatory text, typically morals or poems. This category of books was popular in Europe during the 16th and 17th centuries.

Emblem books are collections of sets of three elements: an icon or image, a motto, and text explaining the connection between the image and motto. The text ranged in length from a few lines of verse to pages of prose. Emblem books descended from medieval bestiaries that explained the importance of animals, proverbs, and fables. In fact, writers often drew inspiration from Greek and Roman sources such as Aesop's Fables and Plutarch's Lives.

== Definition ==
But if someone asks me what Emblemata really are? I will reply to him, that they are mute images, and nevertheless speaking: insignificant matters, and none the less of importance: ridiculous things, and nonetheless not without wisdom [...]

— Jacob Cats, Voor-reden over de Proteus, of Minne-beelden, verandert in sinne-beelden.

Scholars differ on the key question of whether the actual emblems in question are the visual images, the accompanying texts, or the combination of the two. This is understandable, given that first emblem book, the Emblemata of Andrea Alciato, was first issued in an unauthorized edition in which the woodcuts were chosen by the printer without any input from the author, who had circulated the texts in unillustrated manuscript form. It contained around a hundred short verses in Latin. One image it depicted was the lute, which symbolized the need for harmony instead of warfare in the city-states of Italy.

Some early emblem books were unillustrated, particularly those issued by the French printer Denis de Harsy. With time, however, the reading public came to expect emblem books to contain picture-text combinations. Each combination consisted of a woodcut or engraving accompanied by one or more short texts, intended to inspire their readers to reflect on a general moral lesson derived from the reading of both picture and text together. The picture was subject to numerous interpretations: only by reading the text could a reader be certain which meaning was intended by the author. Thus the books are closely related to the personal symbolic picture-text combinations called personal devices, known in Italy as imprese and in France as devises. Many of the symbolic images present in emblem books were used in other contexts, on clothes, furniture, street signs, and the façades of buildings. For instance, a sword and scales symbolized death.

== Miscellany ==
Emblem books attained enormous popularity throughout continental Europe, though in Britain they did not capture the imagination of readers to quite the same extent. The books were especially numerous in the Netherlands, Belgium, Germany, and France. Emblem books first became popular in the sixteenth century with Andrea Alciato's Emblemata and remained popular until the eighteenth century.

Many emblematic works borrowed plates or texts (or both) from earlier exemplars, as was the case with Geoffrey Whitney's Choice of Emblemes, a compilation which chiefly used the resources of the Plantin Press in Leyden.

Early European studies of Egyptian hieroglyphs, like that of Athanasius Kircher, assumed that the hieroglyphs were emblems, and imaginatively interpreted them accordingly.

A similar collection of emblems, but not in book form, is Lady Drury's Closet.

== Timeline ==
Author or compilator	Title	Engraver, Illustrator	Publisher	Loc.	Publ.	Theme	# of Embl.	Lang. (Note: Original language, using ISO 639-1)	Notes
Andrea Alciato	Emblemata	probably Hans Schäufelin after Jörg Breu the Elder	Heinrich Steyner	Augsburg	1531		104		the first and most widely disseminated emblem book.
Guillaume de La Perrière	Le théâtre des bons engins, auquel sont contenuz cent emblèmes moraulx		Denis Janot	Paris	1539				
Achille Bocchi	Symbolicarum quaestionum de universo genere				1555				
Gabriele Faerno	Centum Fabulae				1563	fables	100	la	
János Zsámboky	Emblemata cum aliquot nummis antiqui operis			Vienna	1564				
Joris Hoefnagel	Patientia			London	1569	moral			
Georgette de Monteney	Emblemes, ou Devises Chrestiennes		Jean de Tournes ?	Lyon	1571				
Nicolaus Reusner	Emblemata			Frankfurt	1581				
Geoffrey Whitney	Choice of Emblemes	(various)	Plantin	Leiden	1586		248		
Cesare Ripa	Iconologia			Rome	1593				not properly speaking an emblem book but a collection of erudite allegories.
Nicolaus Taurellus	Emblemata Physico Ethica			Nuremberg	1595				
Daniel Heinsius	Quaeris quid sit amor	Jakob de Gheyn II		(Netherlands)	1601	love			first emblem book dedicated to love; later name "Emblemata amatoria"
Jacobus Typotius	Symbola Divina et Humana	Aegidius Sadeler II		Prague	1601				
Otto van Veen	Amorum Emblemata	Otto van Veen	Henricus Swingenius	Antwerp	1608	love	124	la	Published in more than one multilingual edition, with variants including French, Dutch, English, Italian and Spanish
Pieter Corneliszoon Hooft	Emblemata Amatoria			(Netherlands)	1611	love			Not to be confused with Quaeris quid sit amor, which was republished under the same name.
Gabriel Rollenhagen	Nucleus emblematum			Hildesheim	1611				
Otto van Veen	Amoris divini emblemata	Otto van Veen		(Netherlands)	1615	divine love			
Daniel Heinsius	Het Ambacht van Cupido			Leiden	1615				
Michael Maier	Atalanta Fugiens	Matthias Merian	Johann Theodor de Bry	Oppenheim	1617	alchemy	50	la,de	Also contains a fugue for each emblem
Peter Iselburg	Aula Magna Curiae Noribergensis Depicta			Nuremberg	1617		32	la,de	
Daniel Cramer, Conrad Bachmann	Emblemata Sacra				1617		40		
(various)	Thronus Cupidinis			(Netherlands)	1618				
Jacob Cats	Silenus Alcibiadis, sive Proteus			(Netherlands?)	1618				
Jacob Cats	Sinn’en Minne-beelden	Adriaen van de Venne		(Netherlands)	1618				Two alternative explanations for each emblem, one related to mind (Sinnn), the other to love (Minne).
Julius Wilhelm Zincgref	Emblemata			Frankfurt	1619				
Jacob Cats	Monita Amoris Virginei			Amsterdam	1620	moral	45		for women
Raphael Custos	Emblemata amoris				1622				
Johan de Brune	Emblemata of Zinne-werck	Adriaen van de Venne		Amsterdam	1624		51		
Herman Hugo	Pia desideria	Boetius à Bolswert		Antwerp	1624			la	42 Latin editions; widely translated
Daniel Stolz von Stolzenberg	Viridarium Chymicum			Prague?	1624	alchemy			
Zacharias Heyns	Emblemata			(Netherlands?)	1625				
Lucas Jennis	Musaeum Hermeticum			Frankfurt	1625	alchemy		la	
Jacob Cats	Proteus ofte Minne-beelden			Rotterdam	1627				
Benedictus van Haeften	Schola cordis				1629				
Daniel Cramer	Emblemata moralia nova			Frankfurt	1630				
Antonius a Burgundia	Linguae vitia et remedia	Jacob Neefs, Andries Pauwels	Joannes Cnobbaert	Antwerp	1631		45		
Jacob Cats	Spiegel van den Ouden ende Nieuwen Tijdt	Adriaen van de Venne		(Netherlands?)	1632				
Henry Hawkins	Partheneia Sacra				1633				
Etienne Luzvic	Le cœur dévot				1634				translated into English as The Devout Heart
George Wither	A collection of Emblemes, Ancient and Moderne				1635				
Francis Quarles	Emblems	William Marshall & al.			1635				
Jan Harmenszoon Krul	Minne-spiegel ter Deughden			Amsterdam	1639				
Jean Bolland, Sidronius Hosschius	Imago primi saeculi Societatis Iesu a provincia Flandro-Belgica ejusdem Societatis repraesentata	Cornelis Galle the Elder	Plantin Press	Antwerp	1640	A Jesuit emblem book illustrating the history of the Jesuit order in the Southern Netherlands			
Diego de Saavedra Fajardo	Empresas Políticas				1640				
Francesco Pona	Cardiomorphoseos, sive ex corde desumpta emblemata sacra			Verona	1645		101		
(anonymous)	Devises et emblemes d'amour	Albert Flamen		Paris	1648				
Filippo Picinelli	Il mondo simbolico			Milan	1653	encyclopedic		it	1000 pages
Adrien Gambart	La Vie symbolique du bienheureux François de Sales	Albert Flamen		Paris	1664				
Jan Luyken	Jesus en de ziel			(Netherlands)	1678				
Josep Romaguera	Atheneo de Grandesa	(anonymous)		Barcelona	1681		15	ca	
	Livre curieux et très utile pour les sçavans, et artistes	Nicolas Verrien	Daniel de La Feuille	Amsterdam	1691	encyclopedic			
Jan Luyken	Het Menselyk Bedryf ("The Book of Trades")			(Netherlands?)	1694	trades			
Jacobus Boschius	Symbolographia sive De Arte Symbolica sermones septem		Caspar Beucard	Augsburg	1701	encyclopedic	3347		
Romeyn de Hooghe	Hieroglyphica of Merkbeelden der oude volkeren			(Netherlands?)	1735				

== Authors and artists famous for emblem books ==
- Andrea Alciato (1492–1550)
- Guillaume de La Perrière (1499/1503 – 1565)
- Georgette de Montenay (1540–1581)
- Otto van Veen (c. 1556 – 1629)
- Jacob Cats (1577–1660)
- Albert Flamen (c. 1620 – after 1669)
