= Guillaume de La Perrière =

French philosopher

Guillaume de La Perrière (1499/1503 in Toulouse – 1565) was one of the earliest French writers of emblem books. His work is often associated with the French Renaissance. La Perrière chronicled events in his home city of Toulouse. His best known work is Le Théâtre des bons engins, published in Paris in 1539, and was edited in later editions, published in 1540 and 1585. More recently, La Perrière's Le miroir politique (1555) has received attention, thanks to the work of Michel Foucault. Foucault identifies the work of La Perriere as belonging to Early Modern France and foreshadowing discourses of governmentality.

== Legacy ==
In the service of the capitouls of Toulouse, La Perrière wrote several chronicles of the city's Annals between 1539 and 1553, and dedicated to them his political treatise Le Miroir politicque, published posthumously in 1555. In his lecture of 1 February 1978 at the Collège de France, Michel Foucault took the Miroir politicque as an early example of the literature on the "art of government" that emerged in opposition to Machiavelli's The Prince: rather than the preservation of a principality, its object was the right disposition of people and things. This reading has made La Perrière a frequent reference in studies of governmentality.

== Images from Le Théâtre des Bons Engins ==
Six pages from the 1545 edition.

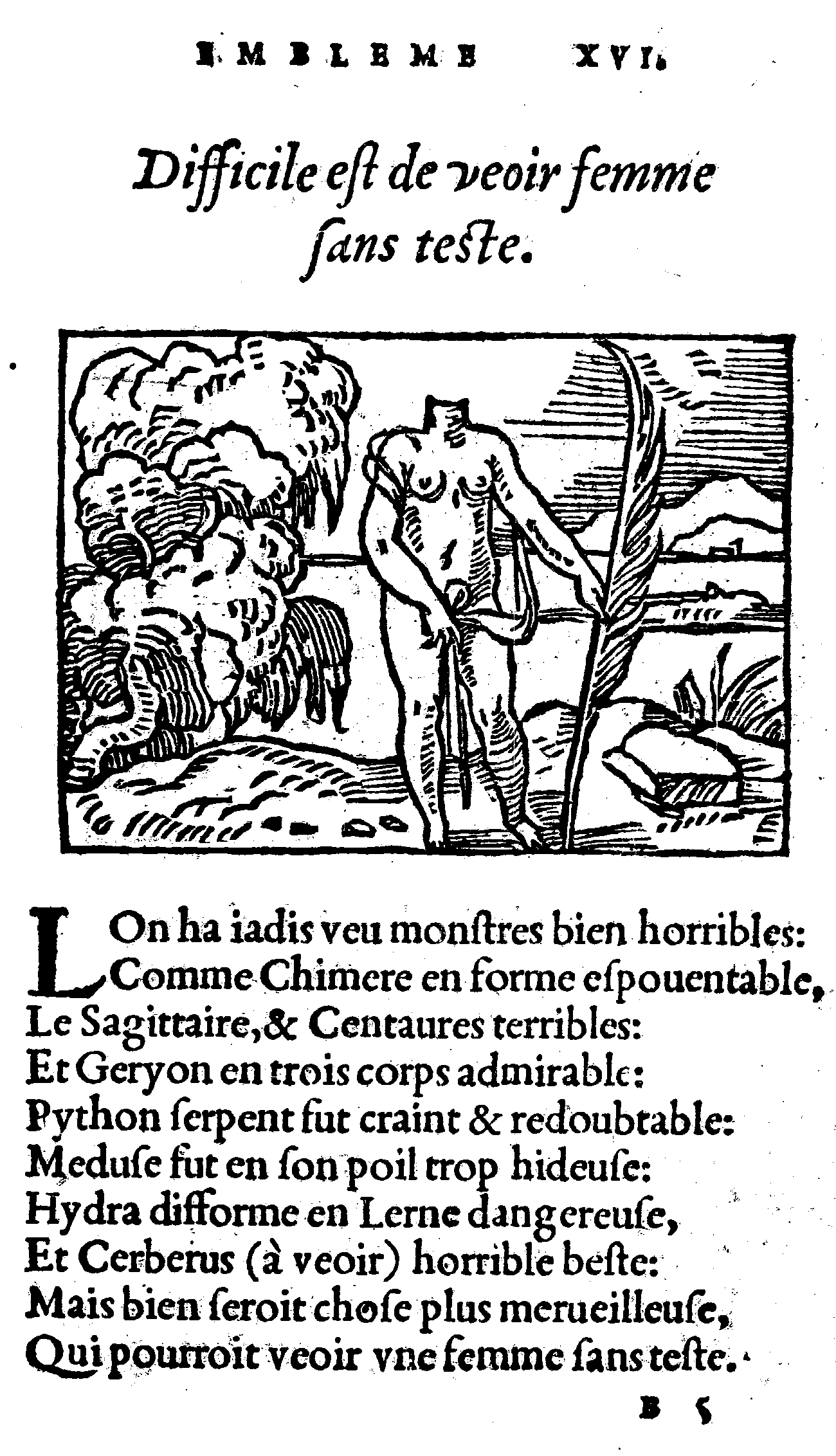
XVI. Difficile est de voir femme sans tête.

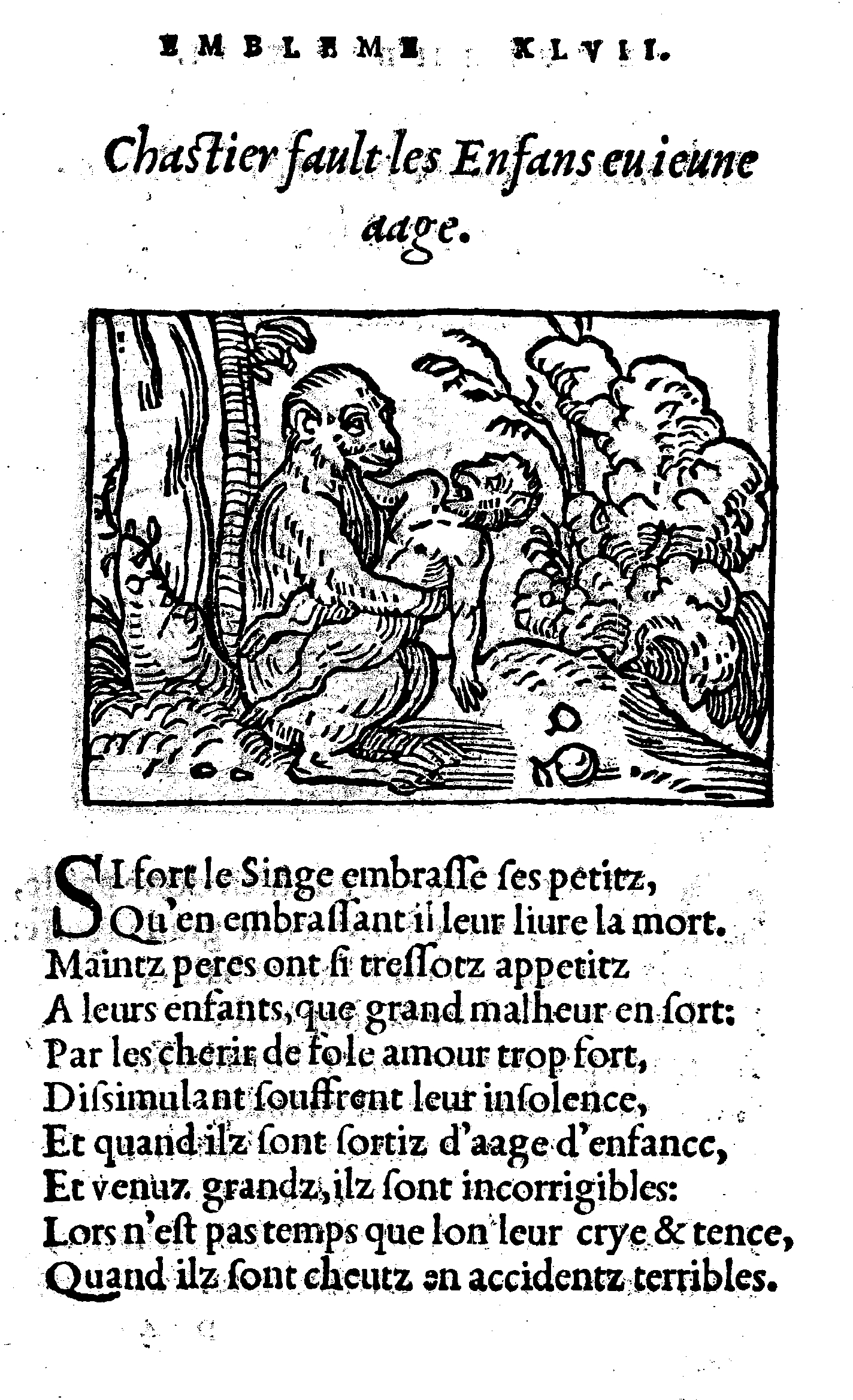
XLVIII. Châtier faut les enfants en jeune âge.

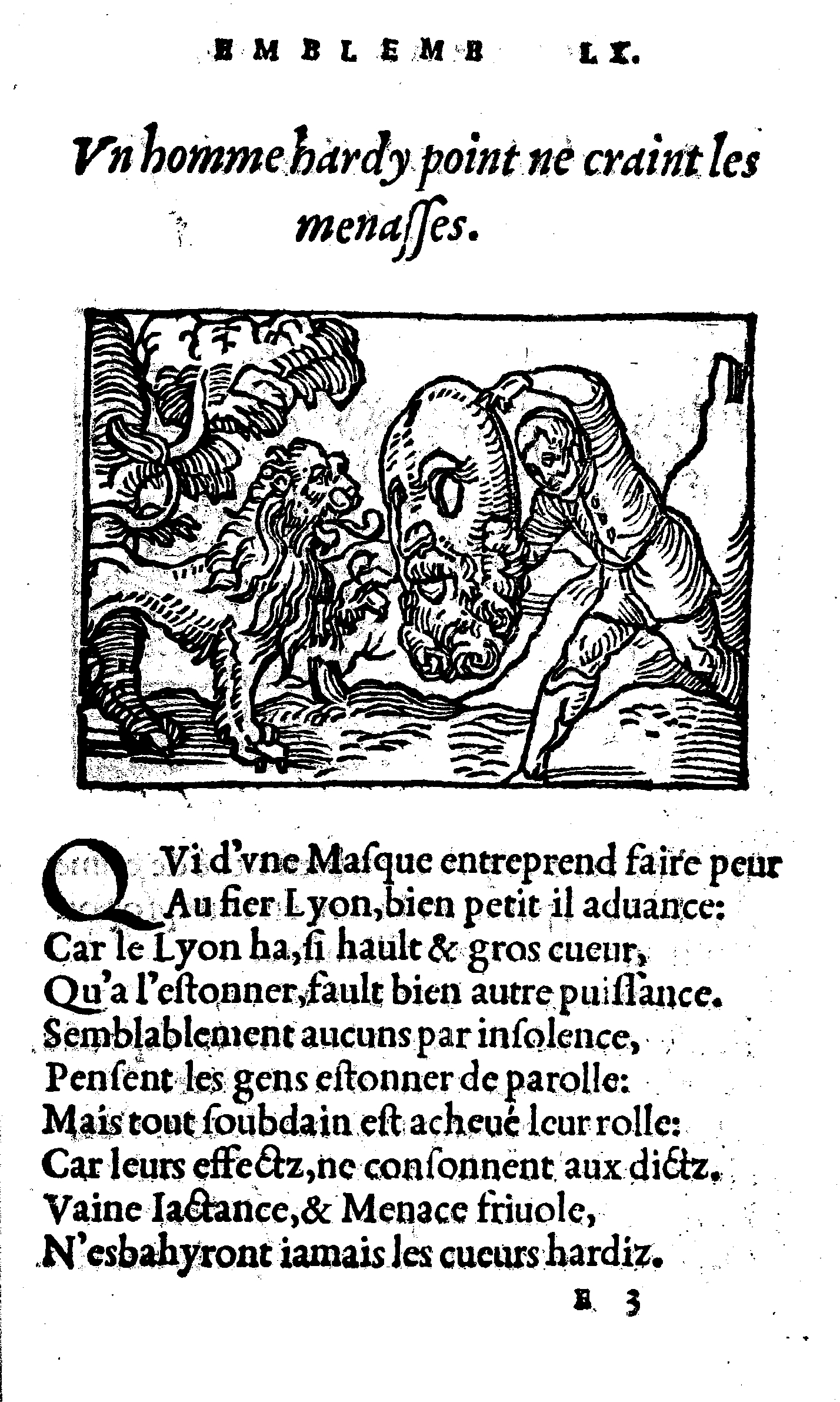
LX. Un homme hardi point ne craint les menaces.
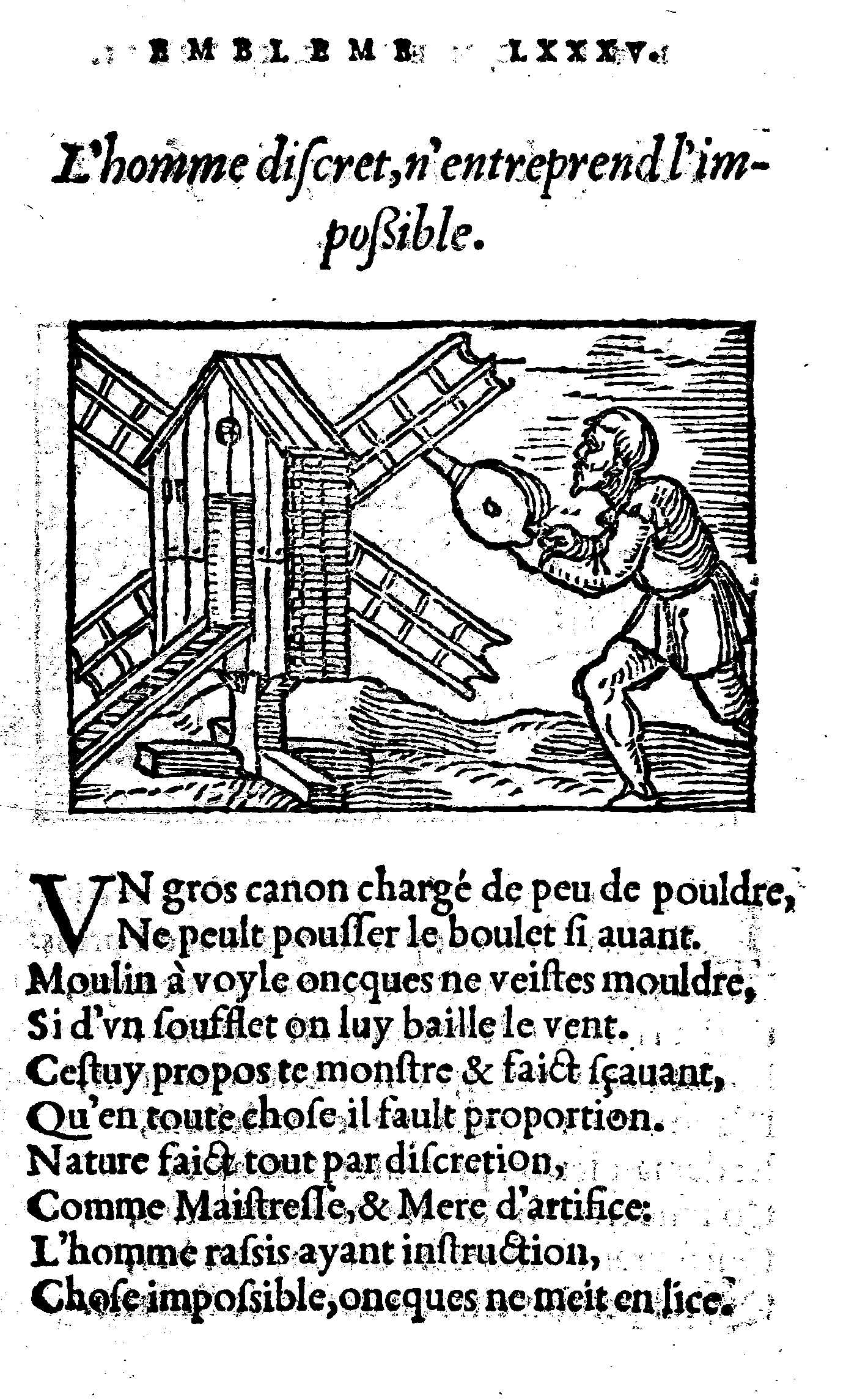
LXXXV. L'homme discret n'entreprend l'impossible.

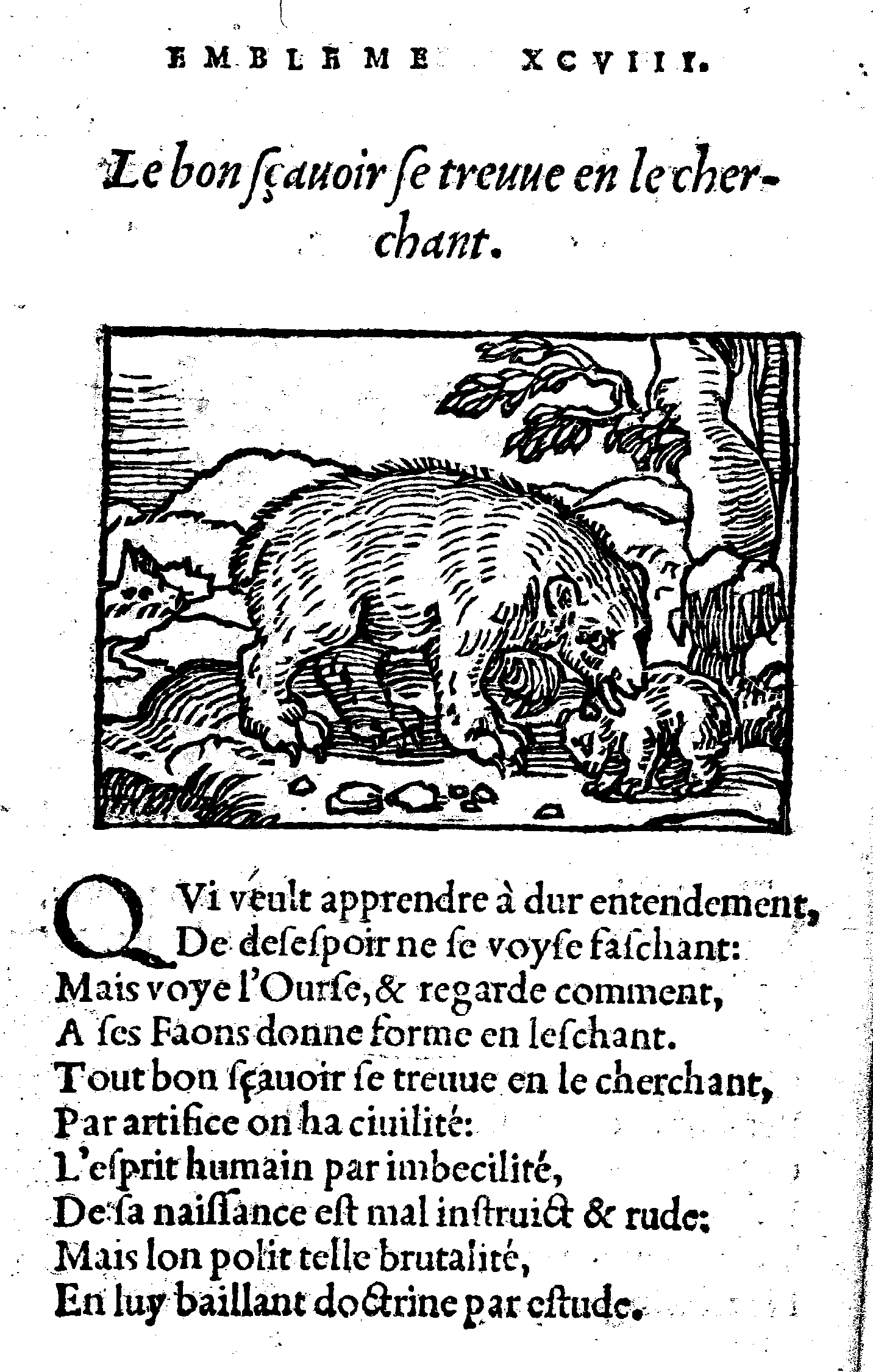
XCVIII. Le bon savoir se trouve en le cherchant.

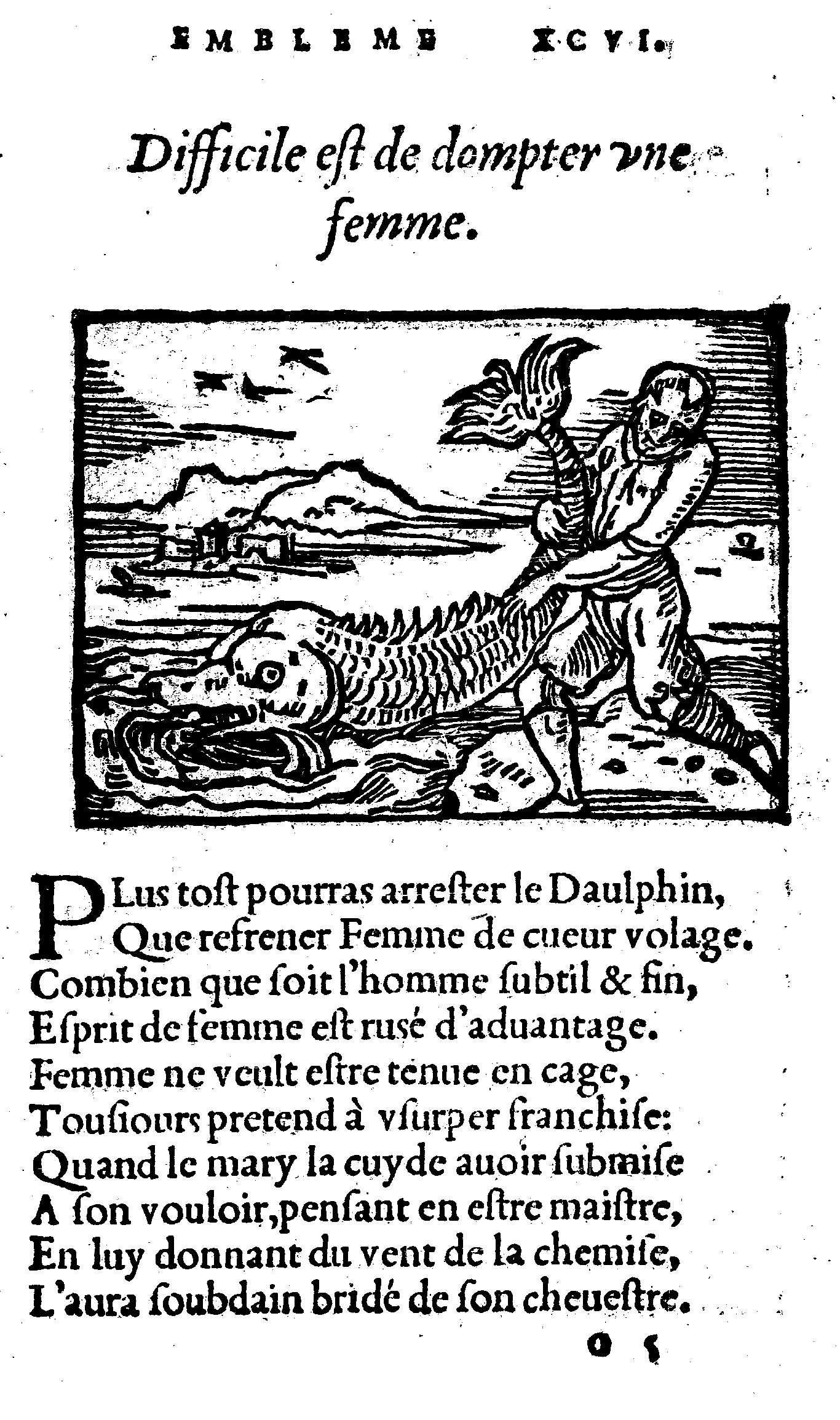
XCVI. Difficile est de dompter une femme.

== Works ==
- Le Theatre des bons engins, auquel sont contenus cent emblemes (Denis Janot, 1539)
- "Les annalles de Foix" (Nicolas Vieillard, Toulouse, 1539)
- Les Considerations des quatre mondes (Macé Bonhomme, 1552)
- La Morosophie (Macé Bonhomme, 1553)
- Le miroir politique, contenant diverses manieres de gouverner & policer les republiques, qui sont, & ont está par cy deuant: ocuure..., Paris: Pur V. Norment, & I. Bruneau; 1567.
