= Promptuarium Iconum Insigniorum =

1553 book published in Lyon, France

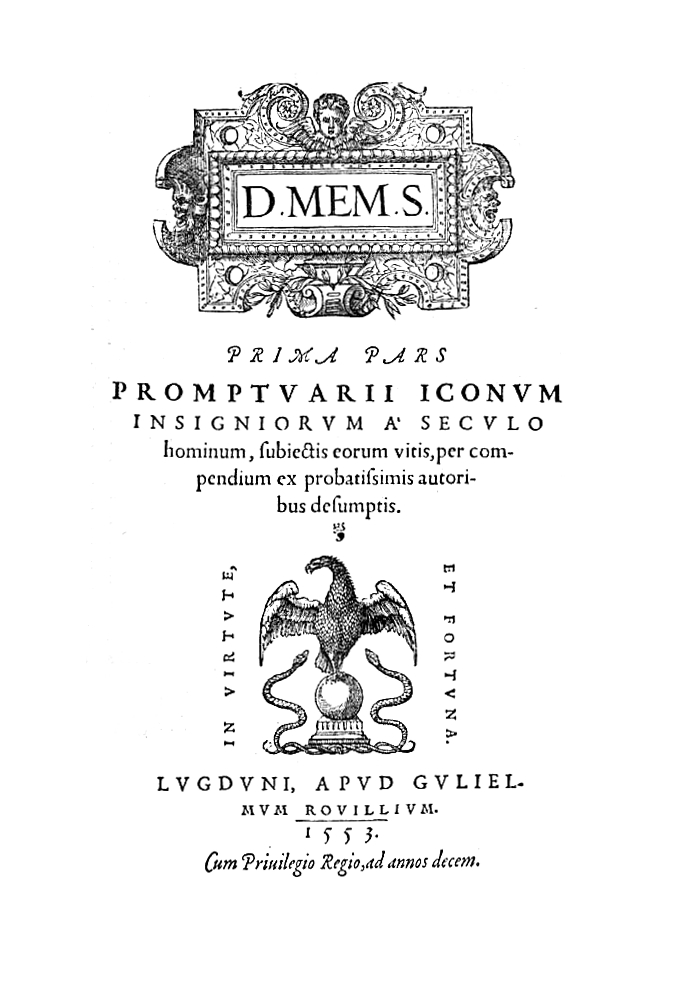
- Title page of the first Latin edition, bearing Rouillé's emblem (Note: An eagle poised atop a globe flanked by two serpents, symbolizing worldly triumph) and motto. (Note: In virtute, et fortuna (Latin for 'In virtue, and [good] fortune')) "D.MEM.S." is an abbreviation for Dis Memoribus Sacrum. (Note: transl. 'Sacred to the Revered Memories')
- Author: Guillaume Rouillé (debated)
- Illustrator: Georges Reverdy
- Language: Latin; French; Italian (1553); Spanish (1561)
- Subject: Iconography; Biography; Historicity of the Bible
- Publisher: Guillaume Rouillé
- Publication date: 1553
- Publication place: Lyon, Kingdom of France
- Pages: 172 (part I); 247 (part II)
- OCLC: 716696497

Prima [et Secunda] pars Promptuarii iconum insigniorum à seculo hominum, subiectis eorum vitis, per compendium ex probatissimis autoribus desumptis. (Note: Prima pars Promptuarii [...] is the title of the book's first part, so the inclusion of the second part has been indicated by adding et Secunda ('and second'), as practiced by—for example—the Bonhams Skinner auction house. The two parts are typically bound into a single volume, although they maintain separate pagination. Henri-Louis Baudrier, a 19th-century Lyonnais bibliographer, abbreviated the Latin edition title as Promptuarium iconum, while Italian painter and antiquarian Riccardo Nobili shortened it as Promptuarium iconum insigniorum a seculo hominum in his 1922 text. The noun promptuarium (Latin for 'storehouse' / 'repository') was a term medieval authors often used to name their lexicographical works. Art historian John Cunnally speculated that Rouillé picked such a term because thesaurus, which would have been a more common term for a portrait book, had been used by Jean de Tournes—who was Rouillé's primary rival in the Lyonnais publishing business—for another portrait book's title.) (transl. 'The First [and Second] Part of the Storehouse of Images of the More Notable Men from the Beginning of Time, with Their Biographies Subjoined, Taken in Abbreviated Form from the Most Approved Authors.') is a compilation of woodcut portraits published in 1553 by Guillaume Rouillé. Rouillé was a bookseller-publisher active in the book trade of Lyon, France. Originally issued in Latin, French, and Italian editions, the book presents the portraits in a medallion format, largely arranged in a supposed chronological order. The subjects range from figures of the Old Testament and Greco-Roman mythology to contemporary individuals of the mid-16th century. Many of the portraits are imaginative rather than historically grounded, shaped by Rouillé's interest in physiognomy—the study that sought to relate facial features to character and personality—and by the engraver's artistic license. Although the engraver is unnamed in the text, the 19th-century bibliographer Henri-Louis Baudrier attributed the work to Georges Reverdy.

The book is divided into two sections: Prima pars ('First Part'), covering figures predating Christ, and Pars secunda ('Second Part'), documenting individuals from the Christian era onward. Typically bound as a single volume, these sections maintain separate pagination systems. The earliest editions contained 828 portraits each, with accompanying biographical summaries; the authorship of these biographies remains debated. The book's commercial success led to subsequent editions in multiple languages, which included a Spanish edition in 1561. The 1577 French edition expanded the collection with approximately 100 additional engravings and placed greater emphasis on Renaissance humanist scholars. The portraits mimic the style of ancient coinage but lack the numismatic precision required for scholarly reference. Rouillé simplified complex histories through standardized imagery and concise narratives so that the past would be more accessible to a general readership. His compilation influenced how individuals were depicted in European iconographic collections from the late 16th century into the 17th.

== Contents ==
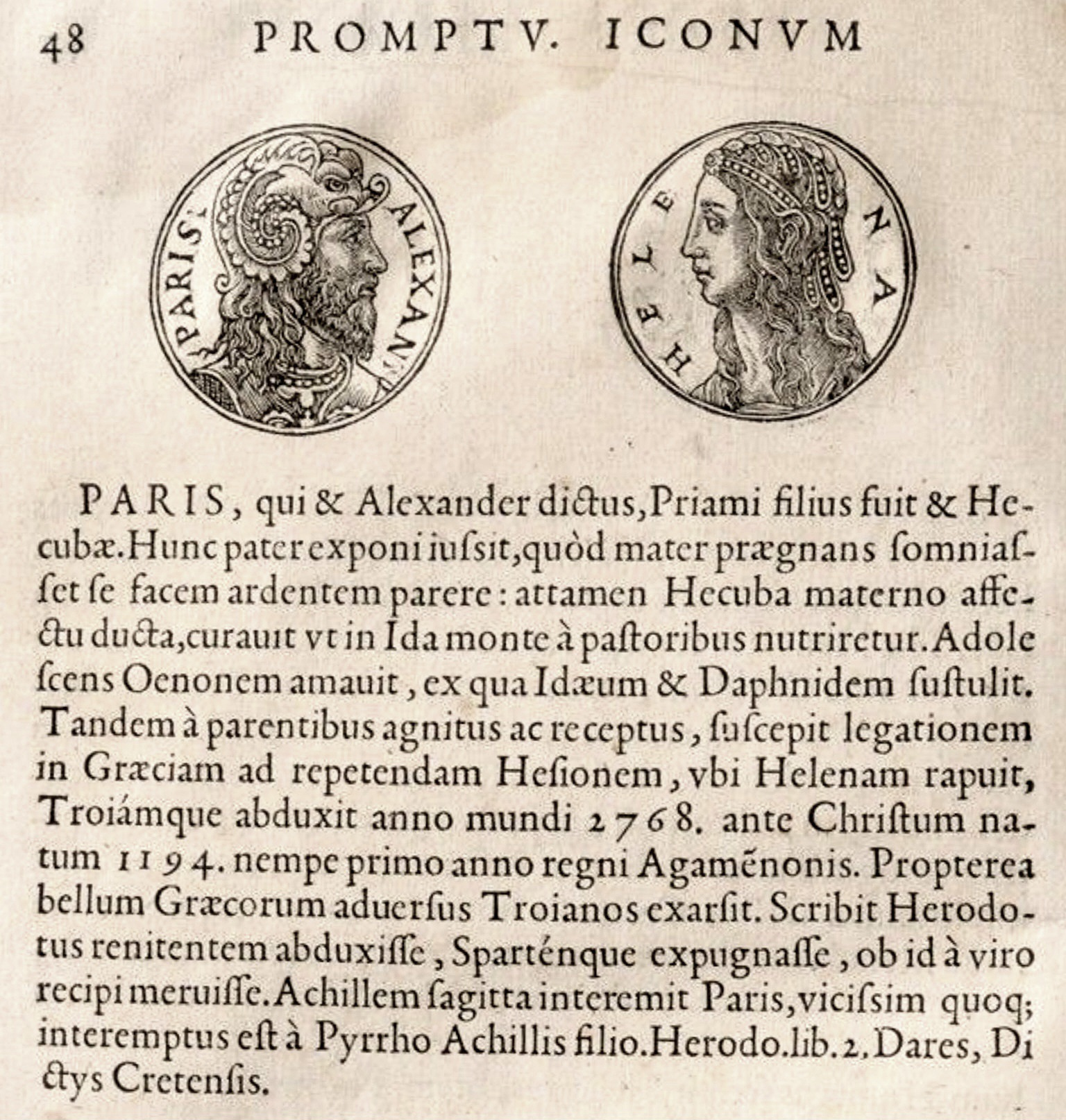
Paris (left) and Helen of Troy, with biographical text in Latin below, on page 48 of the Prima pars ('First Part') of Promptuarium Iconum Insigniorum. The text dates Helen's abduction to Anno Mundi 2768 and Ante Christum natum 1194. (Note: This article incorporates text from this source, which is in the public domain: transl. Paris, also called Alexander, was the son of Priam and Hecuba. His father ordered him to be exposed because his mother, while pregnant, had dreamed that she had given birth to a burning torch. However, Hecuba, moved by maternal affection, ensured that he was raised by shepherds on Mount Ida. As a young man, he loved Oenone, by whom he fathered Idaios and Daphnis. Finally recognized and accepted by his parents, [Paris] undertook a mission to Greece to demand the return of Hesione, where he abducted Helen and brought her to Troy in the year 2768 of the world, 1194 years before the birth of Christ, during the first year of Agamemnon's reign. As a result, the war between the Greeks and the Trojans broke out. Herodotus writes that [Paris] abducted her despite resistance, and conquered Sparta, thereby deserving to receive her from her husband. Paris killed Achilles with an arrow but was himself killed in turn by Pyrrhus, the son of Achilles. Herodotus, Book 2. Dares and Dictys Cretensis. — Page 48 of Promptuarium Iconum Insigniorum, Latin edition (1553))

The book has 828 portraits in its earliest editions. The portraits follow a standardized medallion format, each encircled by a decorative border with the subject's name inscribed curvilinearly along its inner edge. Most portraits are arranged in pairs per page, accompanied by concise biographical summaries below. Many of these paired portraits depict individuals in relationships, regardless of their marital status or the legitimacy of their union. In cases of remarriage, subjects occasionally appear multiple times, portrayed alongside different spouses. In one instance, a same-sex relationship between the paired individuals is implied.

The title page displays Rouillé's printer's mark, which depicts an eagle standing on a globe with serpents on either side. This iconography adapts a pre-classical emblem that medieval Christians interpreted as representing Christ's victory over Satan. In Rouillé's version, the eagle's position atop the terrestrial sphere suggests worldly, rather than spiritual, dominion. This symbolic representation is flanked by his Latin motto, In virtute, et fortuna ('In virtue, and [good] fortune'), adapted from Sebastian Gryphius's Virtute duce, comite Fortuna ('With Virtue as guide, Fortuna as companion'), which, in turn, derives from Cicero's letter to Lucius Munatius Plancus. Above the book's title, an ornate cartouche bears the inscription "D. MEM. S.", abbreviating the Latin phrase Dis Memoribus Sacrum ('Sacred to the Revered Memories').

The work comprises two supposedly chronological sections: Prima pars ('First Part') and Pars secunda ('Second Part'). Though maintaining separate pagination, these sections typically appear bound as a single volume. Christ's birth, dated to the year 3962 after the biblical world creation, serves as the dividing point. The Prima pars catalogs figures from the pre-Christian era, documenting their major biographical events through dual dating systems: Anno Mundi ('in the year of the world'), derived from Genesis's creation narrative, and Ante Christum natum ('before Christ [was] born'), equivalent to the BC designation. Opening with a portrayal of Adam and Eve as elderly figures, the Prima pars documents Old Testament personalities, including patriarchs, prophets, and monarchs such as Abraham, Noah, Jeremiah, Nimrod, and Ahab. The section incorporates various pagan deities and mythological figures—among them Janus, Osiris, Theseus, the Minotaur, the Amazonian Queens, Vesta, Romulus, and Helen of Troy—demonstrating the Renaissance humanist integration of classical and Judaic traditions. Historical figures from pre-Christian civilizations—such as Zoroaster, Pythagoras, Thales of Miletus, Sappho, Julius Caesar, and Pericles—are interspersed throughout.

The Pars secunda covers figures from the Christian era through the mid-16th century, spanning the post-Christ Roman Empire, the Middle Ages, and Rouillé's contemporary period. The first Latin edition's Pars secunda is titled Promptuarii iconum pars secunda incipit à Christo nato, perpetuam ducens seriem ad usque Christianissimũ Francorum regem Henricum hoc nomine secundum, hodie feliciter regnantem. (Note: transl. The Second Part of the Storehouse of Images begins from the Nativity of Christ, continuing the unbroken sequence up to the Most Christian King of France, Henry II, who now reigns prosperously.) This section opens with a title page depicting the Nativity of Jesus. The work then presents Christ in an enlarged medallion distinguished by a cross-shaped halo, incorporating both Hebrew text and the Latin inscription Christus Rex Venit in Pace, Deus homo Factus est ('Christ the King came in peace, God became man'). The biographical scope includes Judas Iscariot, Pontius Pilate, most Roman emperors, Attila the Hun, the Islamic prophet Muhammad, the early Ottoman sultans, and post-classical literary figures such as Dante Alighieri. Holy Roman Emperors from Charlemagne through Charles V are represented, alongside contemporary royals including Edward VI of England, Margaret of Valois, and Catherine de' Medici. Atypical among the section's portraits is a triple arrangement depicting Emperor Hadrian, his wife Vibia Sabina, and his companion Antinous. Another distinctive example shows Anne of Brittany twice: first with her initial husband Charles VIII of France, wearing a ceremonial wreath, then with her second husband Louis XII, attired in the French hood.

An alphabetical index makes the volume function as a biographical dictionary.

== Iconographic bases and authorship ==
Portrait books—collections of woodcut engravings depicting both real and imagined portraits of notable figures from various historical periods and regions—were widely popular in 16th-century Europe. Guillaume Rouillé, a prominent bookseller-publisher in Lyon's book trade by the mid-16th century, capitalized upon the portrait book genre's commercial viability, as did many other publishers of the period. Bookseller-publishers of this era did not own printing presses but maintained proprietary collections of printing materials. Those involved in illustrated book production also held extensive inventories of plates and woodcuts. Rouillé's adoption of the medallion portrait format derived from the 1517 publication Illustrium imagines ('Images of the famous') by Italian Renaissance humanist Andrea Fulvio, which presented 204 busts of historical figures engraved in the style of ancient coins. In the preface of Promptuarium Iconum Insigniorum, Rouillé acknowledges including fictitious images of individuals said to have lived before the biblical Flood or prior to the invention of painting and engraving, wryly noting that this choice helped him avoid accusations of circulating counterfeit currency. He admits to exercising artistic license in creating these portraits and to basing them on physiognomic interpretations of the subjects' deeds, customs, personalities, and presumed geographical origins. Physiognomy, the study of facial features and their alleged relationship to character and personality, was an established scholarly discipline in Rouillé's time. This approach extended to the book's portraits of historical figures lacking credible iconographic references.

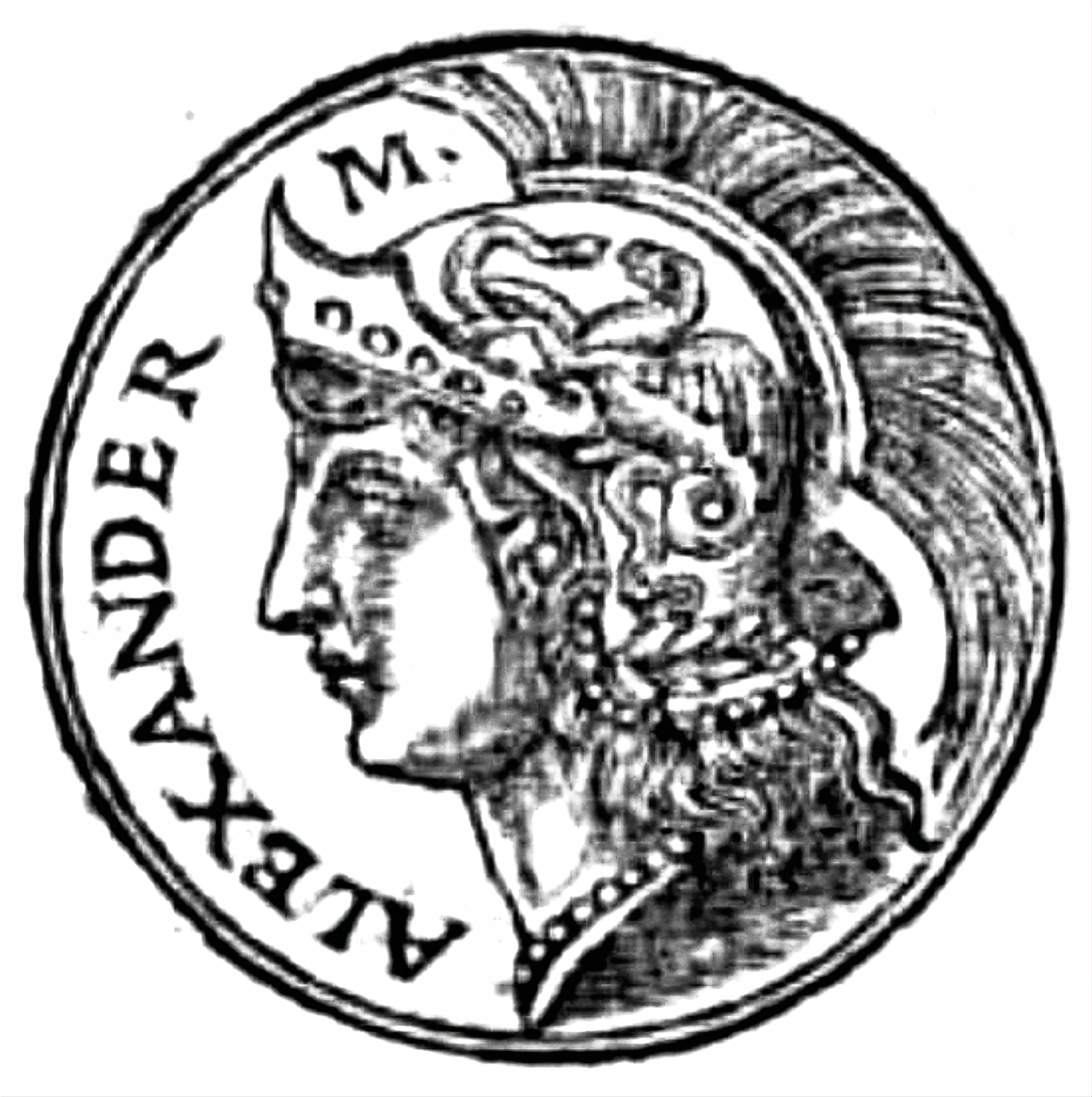
Rouillé and the engraver erroneously based the portrait of Alexander the Great (pictured) on a depiction of Athena from a Macedonian gold stater coin.

The remaining portraits in the book were derived from a diverse array of source materials. Rouillé and the engraver responsible drew upon paintings, earlier published portrait books, as well as select numismatic, sigillographic, and intaglio collections available to them. Their interpretation of numismatic imagery led to several documented errors. For example, they based the portrait of Alexander the Great on the obverse of a Macedonian gold stater depicting the goddess Athena, mistakenly identifying her depiction as that of Alexander. Another misattribution involved identifying Rhodian silver didrachms as the thirty pieces of silver given to Judas Iscariot for his betrayal of Christ, (Note: According to an account in the Gospel of Matthew 26:15 in the New Testament. (Note: Matthew 26:15)) in line with a widespread medieval belief. Conversely, Rouillé and the engraver accurately employed numismatic imagery for the portrayals of Demetrius I Poliorcetes and Mithridates VI Eupator. The portraits of French monarchs were reproduced from two sources: Les Anciennes et modernes genealogies des Roys de France ('The ancient and modern genealogies of the Kings of France'), a 1528 work by French poet and historian Jean Bouchet, and Epitome gestorum LVIII regum Franciae ('Epitome of the deeds of the 58 kings of France'), published in 1546 by Lyonnais bookseller Balthazar Arnoullet. Most of the early Caesars' portraits were sourced from Imperatorum et Caesarum vitae ('Lives of Emperors and Caesars'), a 1534 work by German historian Johannes Huttich.

The portrait engraver is unnamed in the text. In the 19th century, Lyonnais bibliographer and jurist Henri-Louis Baudrier attributed the engravings to Georges Reverdy, noting the technical excellence of their execution. At the time of the book's creation, Reverdy worked in Lyon and had established a reputation comparable to that of Hans Holbein the Younger. Some of the engravings appear to have been either modeled after or created in collaboration with the Dutch painter Corneille de Lyon, as evidenced by stylistic similarities in certain contemporary portraits, such as that of Margaret of Valois, Duchess of Berry. The authorship of the book's textual content remains debated. Rouillé did not explicitly claim authorship, and the dedication to Margaret of Valois in the first French edition bears only the initials "G.R.", which could refer to either Rouillé or Reverdy. An alternative hypothesis suggests that Charles Fontaine, a 16th-century French poet and translator, either authored or translated into French the textual content from the first Latin edition of Promptuarium Iconum Insigniorum.

== Publication history ==
Guillaume Rouillé published multilingual editions of works he deemed to have international appeal, distributing them across Europe through a network of familial connections. Promptuarium Iconum Insigniorum was first published in Lyon in 1553 in three languages: Latin, French (titled La première [et seconde] partie du promptuaire des médailles des plus renommées personnes qui ont été depuis le commencement du monde: avec brieve description de leurs vies et faicts, recueillie des bons auteurs. (Note: transl. The First [and Second] Part of the Storehouse of Medals of the Most Renowned People Who Have Lived Since the Beginning of the World: with a Brief Account of Their Lives and Deeds, Compiled from Esteemed Authors.)), and Italian (titled Prima parte [& parte seconda] del Prontuario de le Medaglie de più illustri, & fulgenti huomini & donne, dal principio del Mondo infino al presente tempo, con le lor vite in compendio raccolte. (Note: transl. The First Part [& Second Part] of the Handbook of Medals of the Most Illustrious and Eminent Men and Women, from the Beginning of the World to the Present Time, with a Concise Account of Their Lives Compiled.)). The French and Italian editions became known by their shortened titles, Promptuaire des medalles and Prontuario de le medaglie, respectively. Each edition carried a dedication: the Latin edition to Henry II of France, the Italian to Queen Catherine de' Medici, and the French to Margaret of Valois, Duchess of Berry. These strategic royal dedications served as a promotional mechanism for the publication. Subsequent editions were released over the following years: the second, third, and fourth French editions in 1576, 1577, and 1581; the second and third Latin editions in 1578 and 1581; and the second Italian edition in 1577–1578. The 1577 French edition demonstrates a historiographical shift through its expanded inclusion of Renaissance humanist scholars, with an emphasis on legal and medical theorists such as François Douaren and Andreas Vesalius. This revised publication incorporated approximately 100 new portraits, focusing predominantly on Rouillé's contemporaneous intellectuals. Among the supplementary material in the appendix were portraits of foundational medical authorities Hippocrates and Galen.

A Spanish translation, titled Promptuario de las medallas de todos las más insignes varones que ha habido desde el principio del mundo, was undertaken by the Valencian theologian and translator Joan Martí Cordero. The dedication, dated September 8, 1558, was composed at the Université catholique de Louvain during Cordero's tenure as a student. It was addressed "[...] al muy alto y muy poderoso señor don Carlos, por la gracia de Dios, Príncipe de las Españas ('[...] to the very high and very powerful lord Don Carlos, by the grace of God, Prince of the Spains')", referring to Prince Carlos of Asturias, the heir apparent of King Philip II of Spain. Rouillé published this Spanish edition in 1561.

== Reception ==
Promptuarium Iconum Insigniorum was commercially successful during its publication period. The work became one of the most frequently documented numismatic texts in library inventories of Spanish artists and collectors in the 16th and 17th centuries. Despite incorporating many coin-derived portraits and adhering to numismatic artistic conventions, the book did not conform to rigorous academic or numismatic reference standards, as evidenced by its omission of several numismatic details—such as the reverse sides of the source coins. Instead, it prioritized accessibility, presenting historical narratives and distinctive visual content for a non-specialist audience. Throughout the late 16th and 17th centuries, multiple European iconographic collections drew upon and replicated elements from Promptuarium Iconum Insigniorum. Its influence stemmed partly from Rouillé's integration of heterogeneous source materials and his selection of portrait subjects that departed from established iconographic conventions of the period.

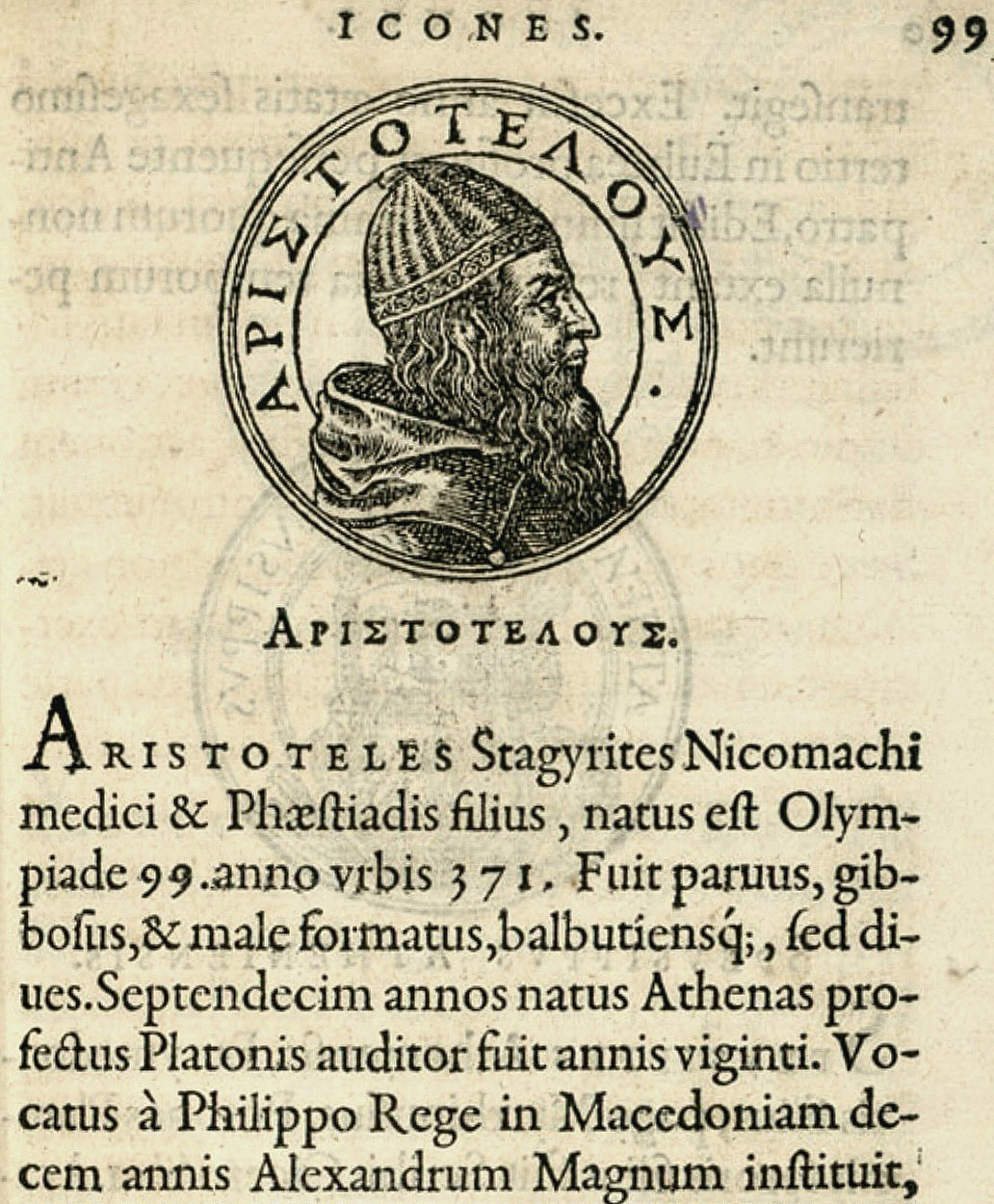
Portrait of Aristotle from Insignium aliquot virorum icones (1559), Jean de Tournes's derivative work of Promptuarium Iconum Insigniorum

A contemporary response from within the Lyonnais publishing industry to Promptuarium Iconum Insigniorum emerged in 1559 with Jean de Tournes's Insignium aliquot virorum icones ('Images of Some Notable Men'), a derivative work using a nearly identical medallion portrait format. De Tournes, a leading figure in the regional publishing scene alongside Rouillé, introduced this publication at a reduced price point, offering a more limited selection of biographical portraits than Promptuarium Iconum Insigniorum. Lacking commercial impact comparable to that of Rouillé's work, this book did not proceed beyond its first edition.

The French physician and numismatist Antoine Le Pois provided an early scholarly assessment of Promptuarium Iconum Insigniorum in his posthumously published 1579 work Discours sur les médailles et gravures antiques ('Discourse on Antique Medals and Engravings'). Le Pois's analysis addressed the value of the work's historical abridgements while expressing reservations regarding its fictitious portraits. Julian Sharman, the 19th-century author of The Library of Mary Queen of Scots, described Rouillé's work as "not one of much numismatic interest"; however he added that the portrait book had been "pronounced to be one of the marvels of early wood-engraving". Art historian Stephen Perkinson situated Promptuarium Iconum Insigniorum within the 16th-century tradition of printed works that bridged medieval mnemonic imagery and Renaissance portraiture, arguing that it exemplified a transitional moment when audiences began to demand physiognomic likeness as the measure of truth while still accepting imaginative effigies as valid. In her 2006 essay, art historian Ilaria Andreoli commented on Promptuarium Iconum Insigniorum: "Rouillé's ambition is [...] to speak to the eyes [...] thanks to which the reader will be able to peer into the features and hear them speak, as if they were actors' masks".

== See also ==
- Roman currency – In the Roman Empire, coins served as an important medium for disseminating imperial portraits.
