= Jean de Tournes =

Jean de Tournes may refer to:

- Jean de Tournes (1504–1564), French printer, publisher and bookseller
- Jean de Tournes (1539–1615), French/Swiss printer, publisher and bookseller
- Jean de Tournes (1593–1669), Swiss printer, publisher and bookseller
