= Paradin =

Paradin is a surname. Notable people with the surname include:

- Claude Paradin (fl. 16th century), French writer
- Igor Paradin (born 1998), Russian football defender
