= Giovanni Battista Ala =

Italian organist and composer

Giovanni Battista Ala (c. 1598-c.1630) was an Italian organist and composer. Little is known of his life, but Filippo Picinelli praised him as an "excellent organist" and a "stupendous composer" in his Ateneo dei letterati milanesi (1670).

He was born in Monza and died at age 32, though his exact dates are uncertain. He was the organist of the Church dei Servitori, in Milan, and composer of canzonets, madrigals, and operas (Milan, 1617, 1625), Concerti ecclesiastici (Milan, 1618, 1621, 1628), and several motets in the Pratum musicum (Antwerp, 1634).
