= Gryphius =

Gryphius (Latin for griffin) may be

- Andreas Gryphius (1616–1664), German lyric poet and dramatist
  - Christian Gryphius, son of Andreas
- Sebastian Gryphius/Sébastien Gryphe (1492–1556), German printer in France
