= Francesco Alciati =

Italian bishop and cardinal

His Eminence Francesco Alciati
- Cardinal-Priest of Santa Maria in Portico Octaviae
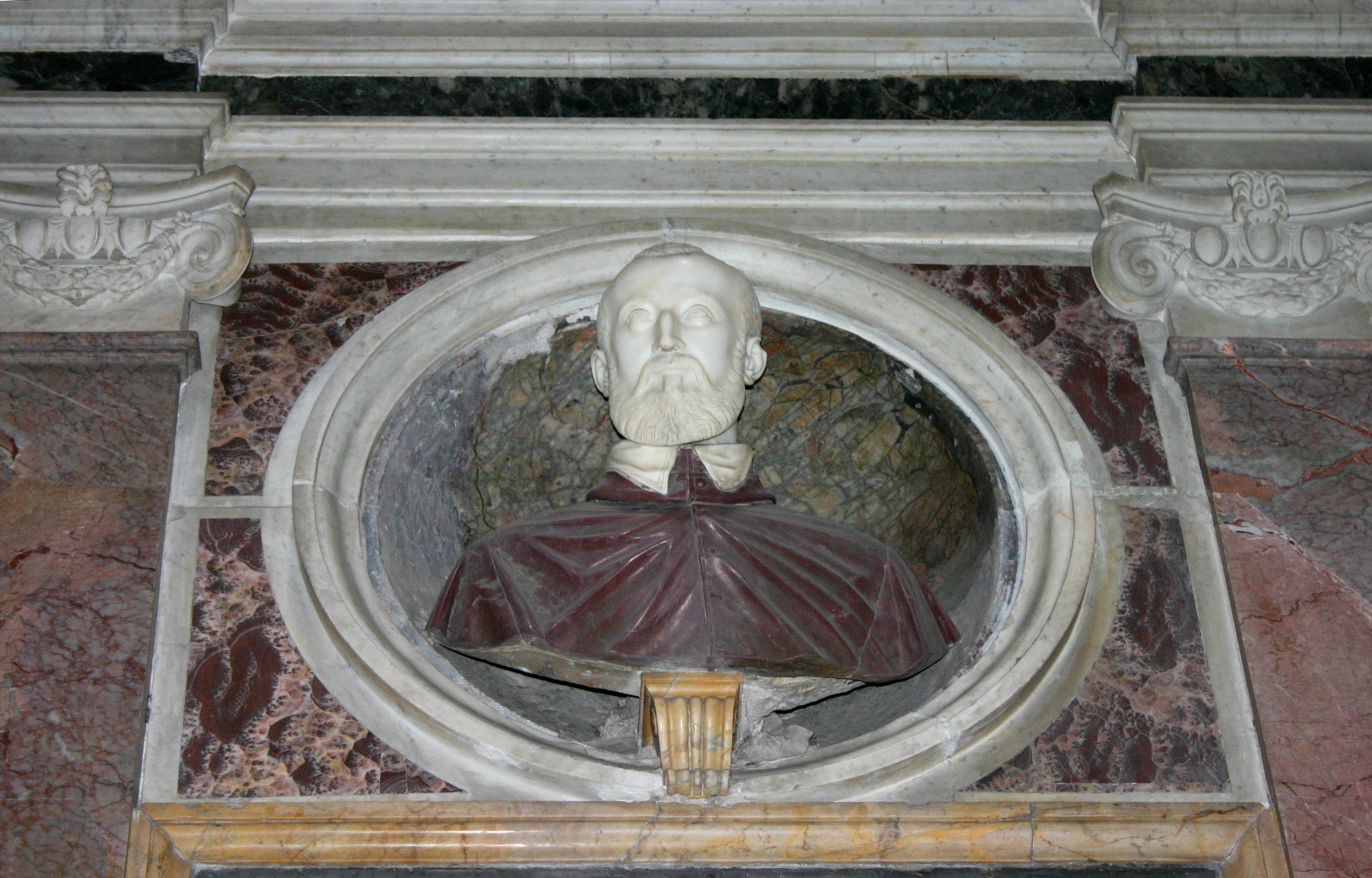
- Tombstone of Cardinal Francesco Alciati
- Church: Catholic Church

Orders
- Created cardinal: 12 March 1565 by Pope Pius IV
- Rank: Cardinal-Deacon of Santa Lucia in Septisolio; Cardinal-Priest of Santa Susanna; Cardinal-Priest of Santa Maria in Portico Octaviae

Personal details
- Born: February 2, 1522 Milan, Duchy of Milan
- Died: 20 April 1580 (aged 58) Rome, Papal States
- Education: University of Bologna; University of Pavia

Francesco Alciati (2 February 1522 – 20 April 1580) was an Italian Cardinal and jurist.

== Biography ==
Francesco Alciati was born in Milan on 2 February 1522. He was a relative of the renowned jurist Andrea Alciato, and studied law under his direction. He soon became one of the most prominent legal scholars in Milan and was nicknamed l'Alciatino to distinguish him from Andrea. In his last will, Andrea entitled him as heir, and entrusted him with the task of editing his unpublished works. After the death of Andrea, Francesco was appointed professor of civil law at the university of Pavia. His best-known student was Charles Borromeo.

Alciati was a close friend of Gerolamo Cardano and advocated his candidacy to the chair of the theory of medicine at Bologna in 1562. Cardano at once named AIciato as his personal representative in Bologna, with the power to arrange the details of salary.

Alciati excelled in science and literature and was a model of erudition. Called to Rome by Pius IV, he was appointed apostolic referendary, and nuncio to the king of Bohemia; he was then appointed bishop, datary, pro-camerlengo, Cardinal deacon of Santa Maria in Campitelli and Cardinal priest of Santa Susanna. He became Protector of the Order of the Carthusians and Protector of the kingdoms of Spain and Ireland to the Holy See. Under St Pius V he became vice-penitentiary and later grand penitentiary.

He died in office and was buried in Rome in the Carthusian Church of Santa Maria degli Angeli.

Alciati published nothing of his own. A manuscript collection of his letters is preserved in the Biblioteca Ambrosiana, while his juridical works, preserved in four manuscript volumes in the Biblioteca Trivulziana, were destroyed during the air-raids of August 1943. His scholarship was highly praised by Piero Vettori and Ludovico Antonio Muratori.

== Bibliography ==
- Picinelli, Filippo (1670). Ateneo dei letterati milanesi. Milan: Francesco Vigone. pp. 198–9.
- Argelati, Filippo (1745). Bibliotheca scriptorum Mediolanensium. Vol. I, 2. Milan: in aedibus Palatinis. pp. 28–29.
- Mazzucchelli, Giammaria (1753). Gli scrittori d'Italia. Vol. 1. Part 1. Brescia: Giambattista Bossini. pp. 372–3.
