= Claude Paradin =

French writer, collector, historian and genealogist

Claude Paradin (c. 1510 – 1573), was a French writer, collector of emblems or "devises", historian, and genealogist.

== Biography ==
Paradin was born in Cuiseaux (Saône-et-Loire), spending his adult life as canon of the Collegiate Church in Beaujeu, between Mâcon and Lyon.

== Publications ==
His Devises Heroïques published in French in Lyon in 1551 by Jean de Tournes was an influential printed collection of 118 emblems or "devises" and included an attached motto. These emblemata became commonly used as markers or models of royal, aristocratic or moral ownership as well as decorative pattern books applied in a variety of crafts including, heraldry, masonry, sculpture, painting, woodcuts or textiles. The 1551 edition was followed in 1557 by an expanded edition, now with 182 "devises" as well as providing a brief explanation of the universal significance of the symbol and how it represents the individual who chose it or to whom the symbol was attributed in the Renaissance as well as the motto. The new wood blocks for the 1557 edition may be by Bernard Salomon who worked closely with Jean de Tournes.

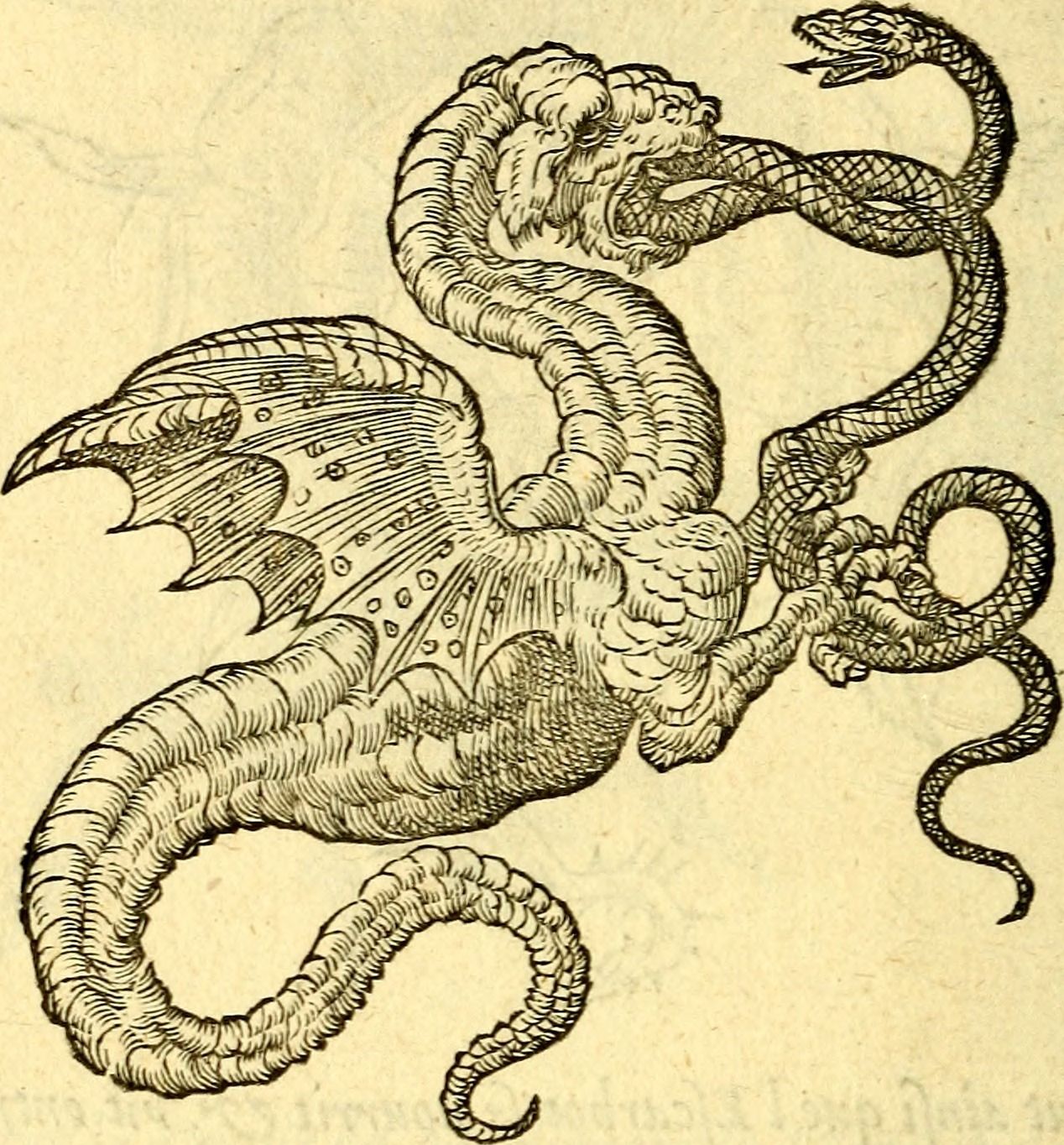
Devises heroïqves (1557). This illustration on page 216 bears the Latin motto "Vunius compendium, alterius stipendium" (The one profits, the other loses). Claude Paradin adds an explanation in French: Si un Serpent ne mangeoit l'autre, iamais ne deuien-droit Dragon. Ainsi les Riches & puissant, croissent au dommage d'autrui. (If a Serpent did not eat another, it would never become a real Dragon. Thus do the Rich and powerful grow by harming another.)

Paradin's other publications included Quadrins Historiques de la Bible, (1553) and the Alliances Genealogiques des Rois et Princes de Gaulle (1561), dedicated to Catherine de' Medici.

== Publication history and international significance ==
Publication of Paradin's Devises Heroïques was taken over by Christophe Plantin in Antwerp from 1561, with the addition of 37 "devises" and the inclusion of a Latin translation of the combined text order to provide for a wider reading public. Plantain's wood cuts still survive in the Plantin-Moretus Museum in Antwerp. It was published in a Dutch Translation in Antwerp in 1563 and in an English translation in London in 1591 and in further French revisions in Paris in the 17th century and a commentary by Adrien d'Amboise. Mary Queen of Scots held at Tutbury Castle and Bess of Hardwick (then Elizabeth Shrewsbury, the wife of Mary's custodian George Shrewsbury) knew and used Paradin's emblems in the design of embroidered hangings. The emblem Ingenii Largitor ("Bestower of Wit") from Paradin's Devises Heroïques is the basis for the centrepiece of the Shrewsbury hanging (c. 1569) on loan to Oxburgh Hall as part of the Oxburgh Hangings. The design shows a raven drinking from a large cup and the initials ES and GS for Elizabeth and George Shrewsbury. The emblem illustrates the fable, found in the Natural History of Pliny the Elder, of the thirsty bird, who, unable to reach water, filled a bowl with pebbles to raise the water level until he could drink.
