= Oxburgh Hangings =

1570–1585 needlework by Mary, Queen of Scots

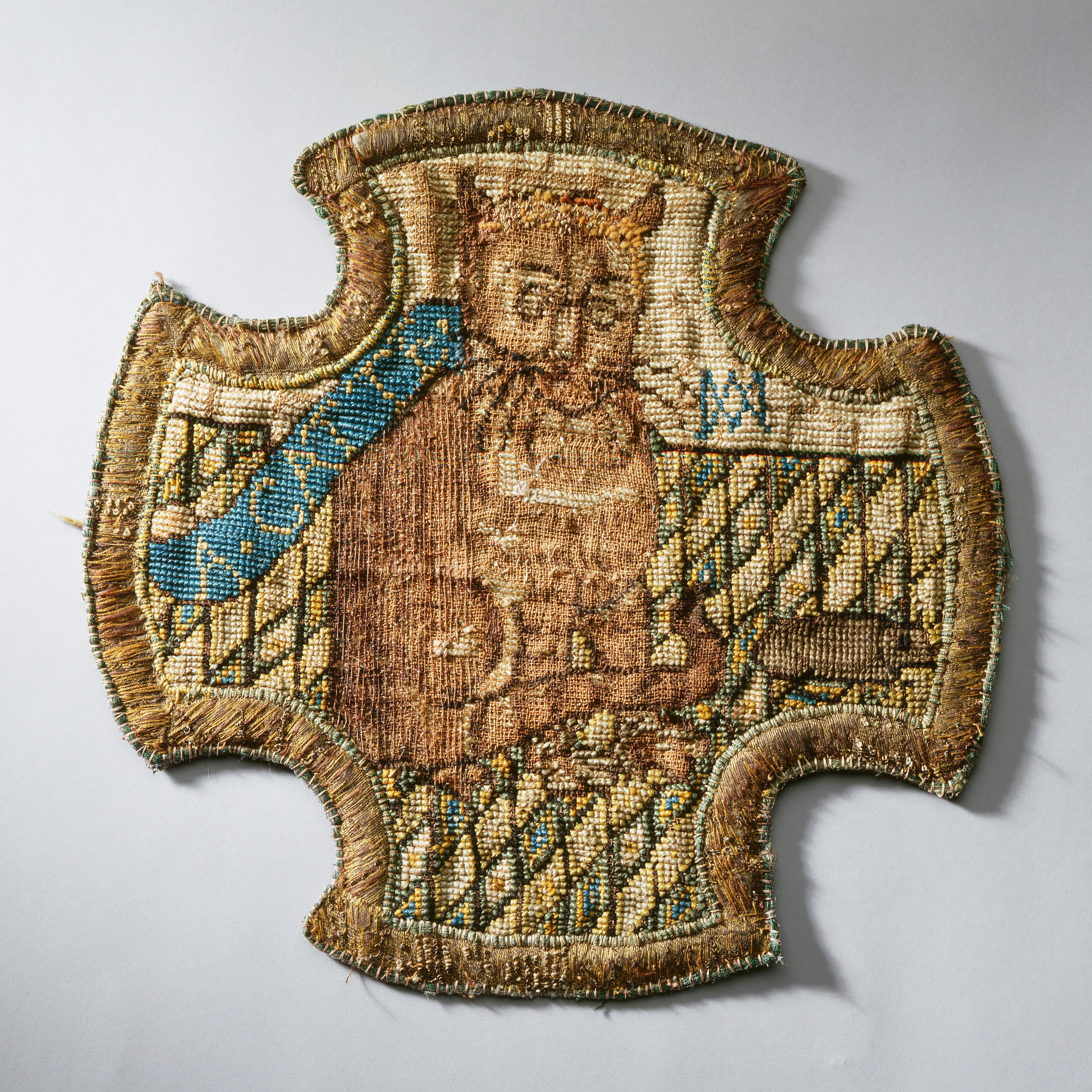
Embroidery of "A Catte", worked by Mary, Queen of Scots, and now displayed at Holyrood Palace

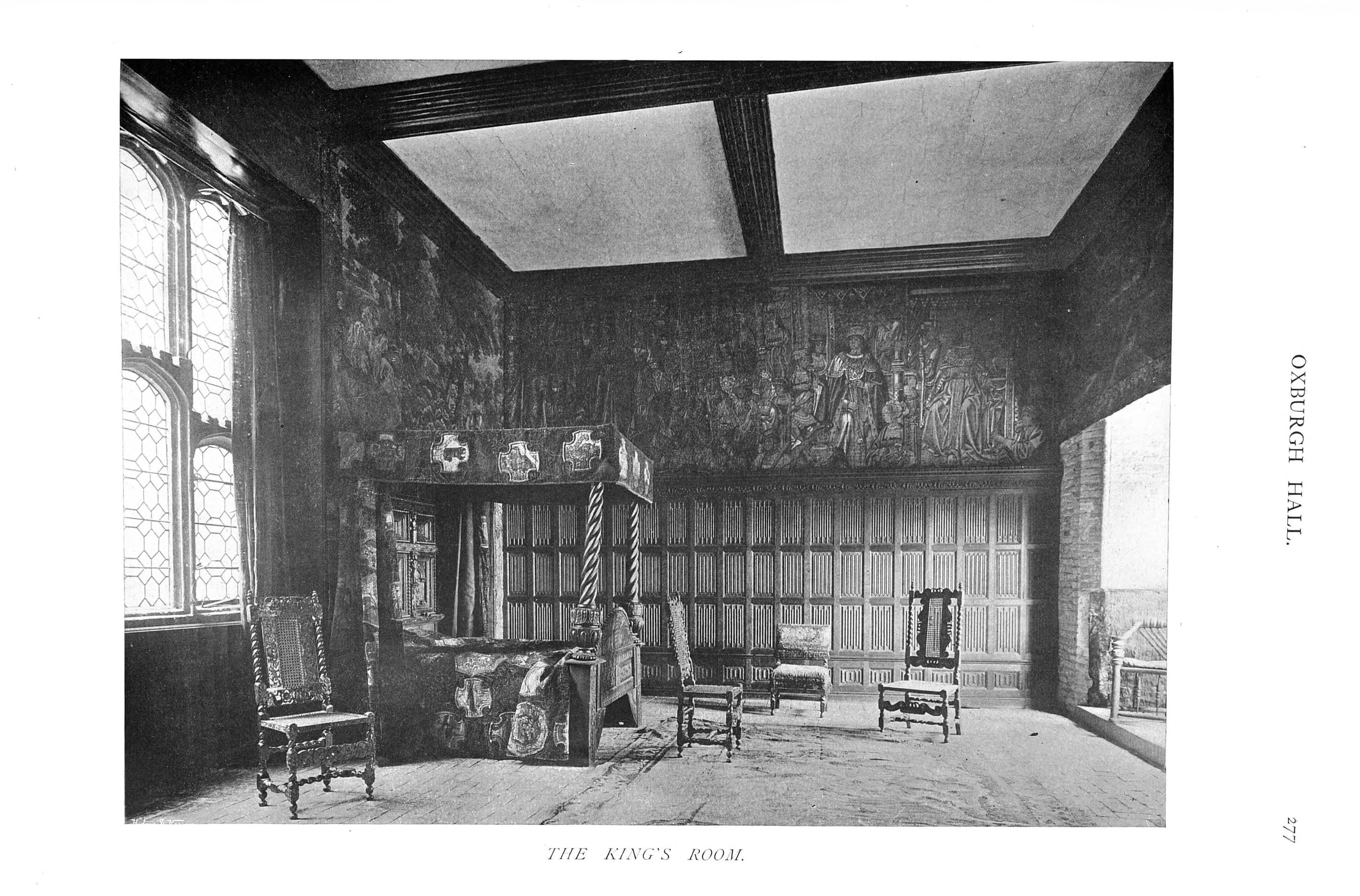
The King's Room, Oxburgh Hall

The Oxburgh Hangings are needlework bed hangings that are held in Oxburgh Hall in Norfolk, England, made by Mary, Queen of Scots and Bess of Hardwick, during the period of Mary's captivity in England.

== Embroidery and the queen ==
The hangings were made between the years 1570 and approximately 1585. An accomplished needlewoman, Bess of Hardwick joined Mary at Chatsworth House for extended periods in 1569, 1570, and 1571, during which time they worked together on the hangings. At that time Mary was imprisoned, in the custody of Bess' husband the Earl of Shrewsbury. One of the embroidery panels, signed as the work of Bess of Hardwick, is dated 1570.

Some of the materials for the textile projects came from France. One of Mary's French administrators, Du Verger, sent silks to Bess of Hardwick in 1574, and in 1577, when Mary was at Sheffield, he sent the Queen a range of coloured silk threads for embroidery, which she called soyes de nuances pour mes ouvrages.

The embroidered panels have been made into a wall hanging, two bed curtains, and a valance. This was probably not the original arrangement of the needlework, and seems likely to be an arrangement sewn together in the late 17th century. There is also another group of 33 embroideries which are the remains of another hanging.

The Oxburgh Hangings consist of green velvet hangings, each with a square centrepiece with octagonal embroidered panels of emblems of plants and animals surrounding it.

=== Print sources ===
The embroidered panels, of which there are over a hundred, were worked in cross stitch on the canvas. The designs of the panels were mostly based on four continental emblem books which Mary owned. The designs were copied from wood-cut illustrations in books by well-known authors such as Claude Paradin, Conrad Gessner, and Pierre Belon. Some of the designs featured exotic and mythical animals copied from the woodcuts of a French book, André Thevet's Les Singularitez de la France Antartique (Paris, 1558). Details featured in the borders of some rectangular panels were derived from the engravings of Hans Vredeman de Vries. Some panels include a phoenix (the symbol of Mary's mother Marie of Guise), and a dragon and a unicorn.

=== Embroiderers in the household ===
The designs were probably devised and first drawn by a professional textile artist at her request and drawn on the canvas. Mary's servant Bastian Pagez was involved in the design process, helping her to pass the time, apparently working up images from her books, and the queen bequeathed some of her embroideries and sewing equipment to another of her French servants, Renée de Rallay. In 1586, Mary's embroiderer was Charles Plouvart. Bess of Hardwick had employed professional embroiderers since 1549, including "Angell my ymbrother".

=== Mary's handiwork ===
The panels made by Mary have her monogram, the letters MA superimposed on the Greek letter phi, and the panels made by Bess have the initials ES. One of the Earl of Shrewsbury's letters mentions the two women working together, with some of Mary's other companions, presenting this as an innocent domestic activity not likely to result in conspiracy or sedition:

"This Queen [Mary] continueth daily to resort unto my wife's chamber, where with the Lady Leviston and Mrs Seton, she useth to sit working with the needle in which she much delighteth and in devising works; and her talk is altogether of indifferent, trifling matters".

The nature of the surviving emblems and their apparent reference to Mary's political situation contradicts Shrewsbury's opinion. A visitor at Tutbury Castle, Nicholas White, mentioned embroidery as Mary's indoor pastime in wet weather. The diversity of the coloured silks relieved the tedium of the labour of the stitch. Mary gave a speech comparing carving, painting and needlework.

=== Provenance ===
The hangings are now part of the Victoria and Albert Museum collection, although they are on permanent long-term loan at Oxburgh Hall. It is thought that the embroideries were once kept at Cowdray Park, and were brought to Oxburgh in 1761 when Mary Browne married Richard Bedingfield. The Browne family seem to have inherited objects and relics associated with Mary from the Howard family. Possibly these relics included a group of Mary's embroideries which had been bought in 1611 from Arbella Stuart (a granddaughter of Bess of Hardwick) by Mary Talbot, Countess of Shrewsbury, a daughter of Bess of Hardwick and the mother of Alethea Howard, Countess of Arundel.

31 more octagonal panels of embroidery, with emblematic designs, some signed "ES", resembling the slips at Oxburgh remain at Hardwick Hall mounted on a screen.

== Political meanings and emblems ==
Thomas Howard, 4th Duke of Norfolk was executed in 1572 for treason, his part in the Rising of the North, and planning to marry Mary, Queen of Scots. During the trial it was mentioned that Mary had sent him a cushion with the Latin motto Virescit Vulnere Virtus, Virtue flourishes from its wounds. John Leslie, Bishop of Ross, testified that he had seen Mary's servant Bortwick deliver the cushion to the Earl, with the motto and device of a knife cutting vines, "all which work was made by the Scots Queen's own hand". This was interpreted as Mary's signal that she was willing to marry the Earl of Norfolk, perhaps by suggesting that the royal branch needed pruning for new fruit. One of the Oxburgh embroidered panels, signed with Mary's monogram, answers Leslie's description exactly, although it seems likely that Mary made two versions of the design and so the surviving panel may not be the work gifted to Norfolk.

James Beaton, Archbishop of Glasgow, her ally in France, sent Mary a watch in January 1575/6, and she wrote to thank him for its jolie devises. Although the watch does not survive, the devices or emblems were copied down. Some of these emblems, referring to enduring adversity, were recorded amongst Mary's embroideries.

John Leslie served as Mary's secretary, and his copy of Conrad Gessner's illustrated work on four-footed mammals, De Quadrupedibus Viviparis (Zürich, 1551), survives in the library of the University of St Andrews. Leslie and his book may have been involved in the production of the embroideries. An embroidered panel featuring a cat is copied from the woodcut in Gessner, and in Leslie's copy an unknown hand has added a translation, "ane catt". However, several other translations used by Mary and Bess as captions differ from those offered in the St Andrew's volume. The embroidered cat panel, labelled "A CATTE", features Mary's monogram and a mouse, and is supposed to represent Elizabeth I oppressing Mary. The textile historian Margaret Swain thought the choice of ginger for the cat's fur reflected Elizabeth's red hair. Alternatively, Mary may have had an emblem of Claude Paradin in mind, in which he used the cat as an emblem of liberty and freedom from imprisonment. This panel was once part of the Oxburgh collection and in 1957 was acquired by the Royal Collection for display at Holyroodhouse.

The son of the Duke of Norfolk, Philip Howard, 13th Earl of Arundel married Anne Dacre. After his father's execution, Philip Howard neglected his wife and attended Elizabeth I, in order to regain royal favour. Mary, hearing of this, sent Anne Dacre an embroidery worked in silks and silver. It depicted two turtle doves eating leaves from a tree. The meaning was interpreted by Anne Dacre's priest that Mary and Anne both loved members of the same family. The novel complicated device and Latin inscriptions were designed by Mary and her embroiderer.

An emblem mentioned by the historian William Camden and recorded by William Drummond of Hawthornden on a bed returned to Holyrood Palace made a similar reference to fruit and the royal succession. The device was an apple tree and a thorn with the motto Per Vincula Cresco or Per Vincula Crescit, meaning to flourish in captivity or in chains. This emblem was also engraved on one of Mary's watches with related motifs. Camden wrote that Mary's use of emblems and a motto Veritas Armata meaning "Truth armed" and forming an anagram Maria Steuarta, were regarded with suspicion and resulted in her transfer from the keeping of the Earl of Shrewsbury to the custody of Amias Paulet and Drue Drury.

At Hardwick Hall a pair of cushion covers include roundels at the four corners and centre, worked in tent stitch, one with Mary's monogram. The designs of the roundels are derived from Gabriello Faerno's Fabulae Centum (Rome, 1563), an Italian version of Aesop's Fables. These designs can be interpreted to mean Elizabeth I, like the protagonists of the fables, would receive her just deserts.
