= Jean de Tournes (1593–1669) =

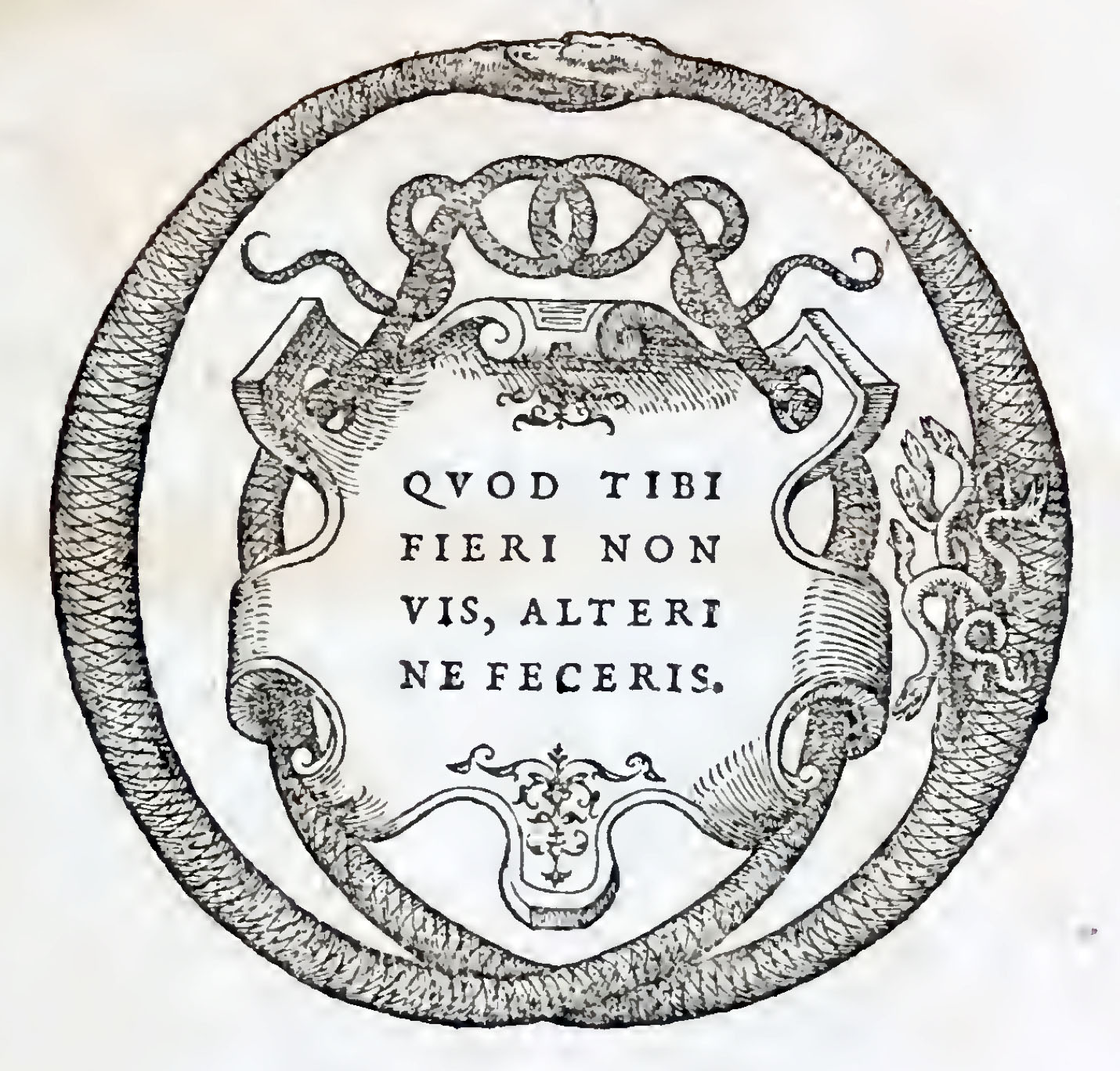
- Device and motto of the printing house of Jean de Tournes, from M. Vitrvvii Pollionis De architectvra libri decem, ad Caes. Avgvstvm, omnibus omnium editionibus longè emendatiores, collatis veteribus exemplis (1586), reprint of the 1552 edition (last leaf, unnumbered)
- Born: 1593
- Died: 1669 (aged 75–76)
- Other names: Jean Detournes; Joannes Tornaesius; Joannes Tornesius; Joannes de Tournes
- Citizenship: Republic of Geneva
- Occupations: publisher, editor, bookseller

Jean de Tournes (1593–1669) was a Genevan printer, book publisher and bookseller, and member of a long-lasting family printing business. He was the son of Jean de Tournes (1539–1615) and grandson of Jean de Tournes (1504–1564); he was the son-in-law of Samuel Crespin.

== Life ==
Jean de Tournes was born in Geneva in 1593. He took over his father's printing and publishing business in 1615. In 1619 he sold his house at the sign of the Deux Vipères in rue Raisin, Lyon, to the printer and bookseller Guichard Julliéron. Jean de Tournes retired in 1653, and was succeeded in the family business by his sons Jean Antoine and Samuel de Tournes. He died in 1669.

The emblem of the de Tournes press was two entwined vipers. Their mottoes included Quod tibi fieri non vis, alteri ne feceris and Virum de mille unum reperi.
