= François Connan =

François Connan (1508 – 1551, in Paris) was a French jurist who took part in the humanist development of an historical jurisprudence. He was a student of Andrea Alciato at the University of Bourges where he was a fellow student and friend of John Calvin. He later and became one of the university's most distinguished epigone. His most celebrated work is the Commentaria iuris civilis (Paris, 1538) an analysis of Roman law and legal theory.

== Works ==
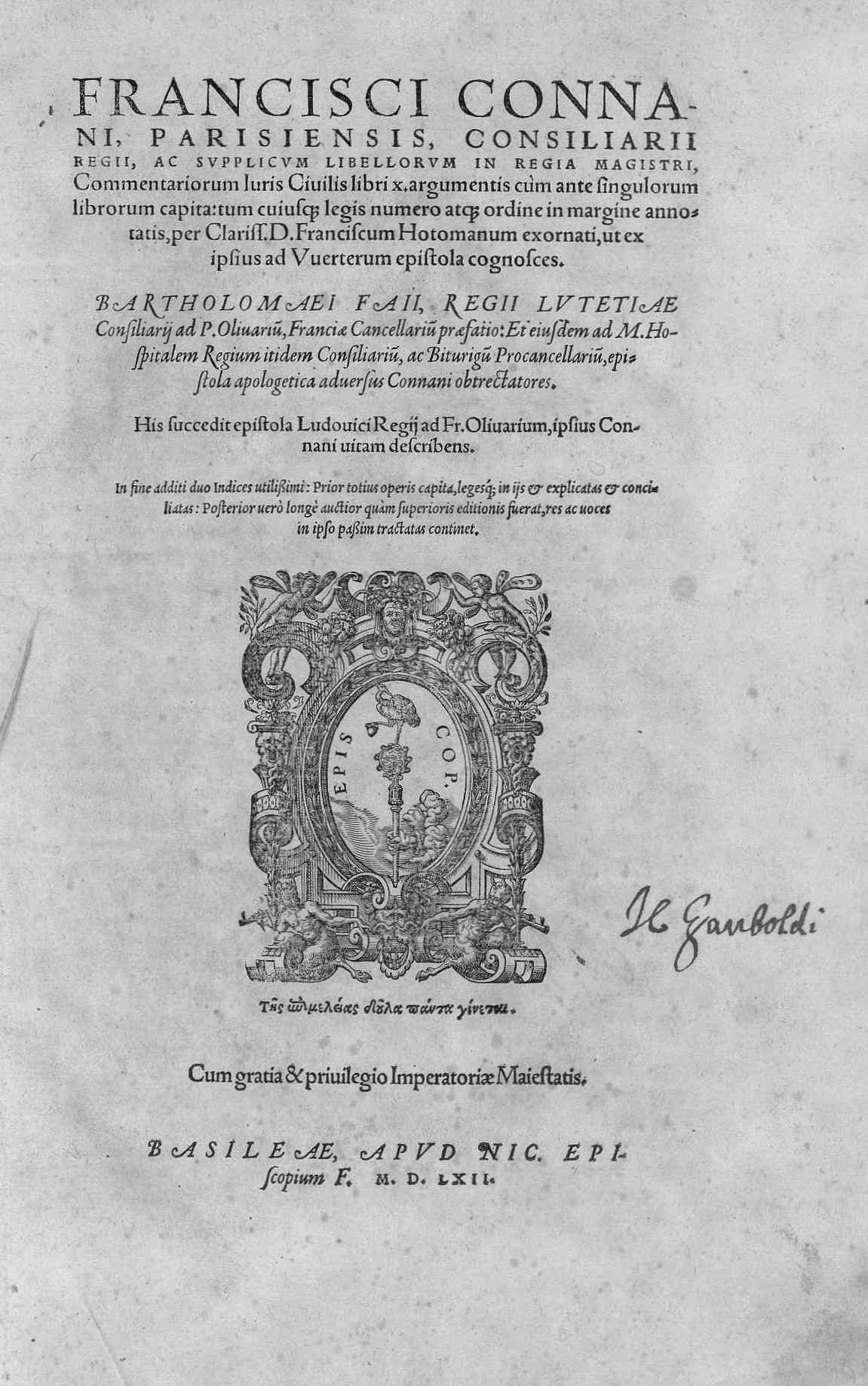
Commentaria iuris civili, 1562 edition

- Commentaria iuris civilis, Paris, 1538.
  - Commentaria iuris civili (in Latin). Basel: Nikolaus Episcopius. 1562.
