= Filippo Picinelli =

Italian Augustinian canon and scholar

Reverend Filippo Picinelli C.R.S.A.
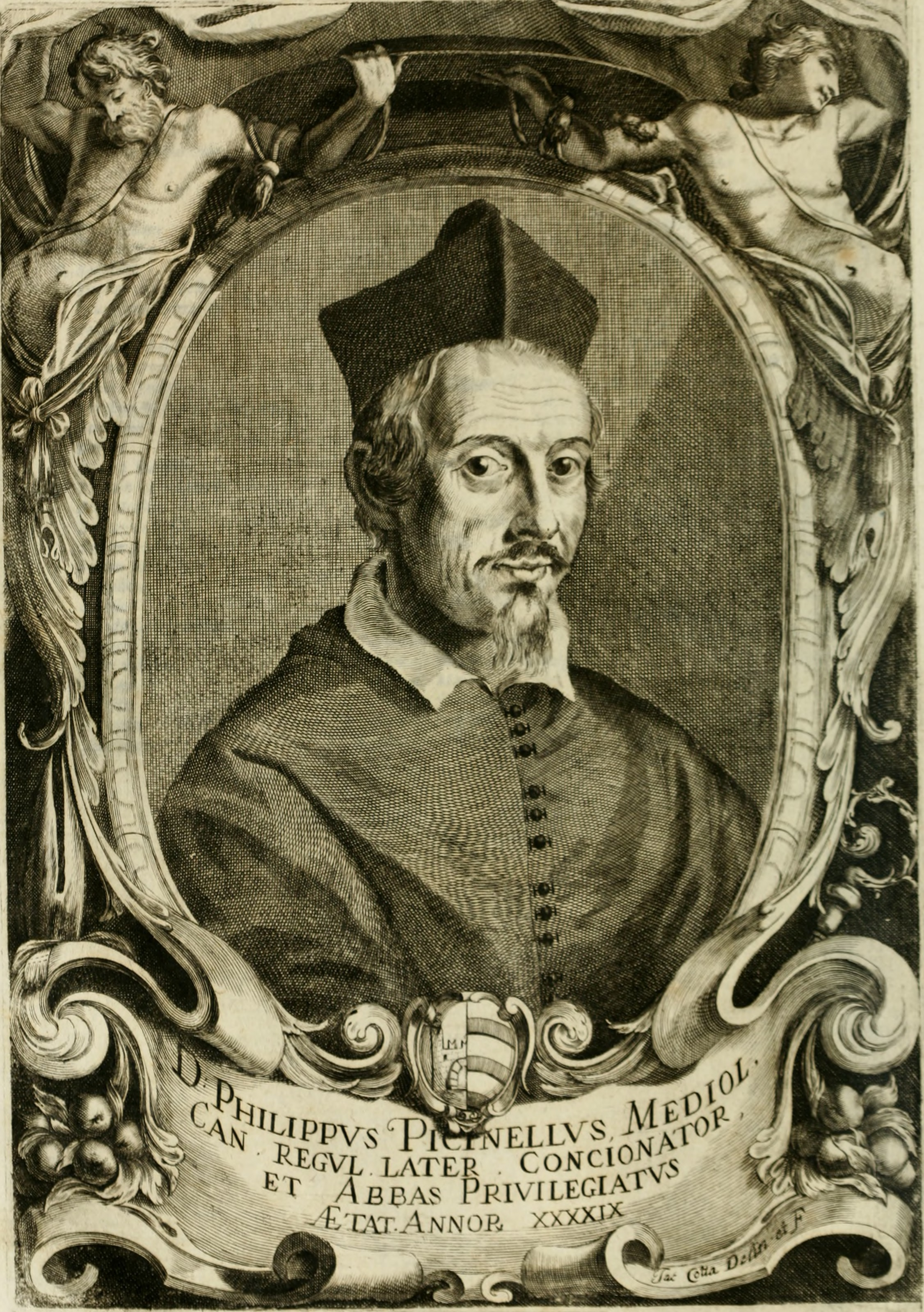
- Filippo Picinelli in Mondo simbolico.
- Born: Carlo Francesco Picinelli; 21 November 1604; Milan, Duchy of Milan
- Died: 1686 (aged 81–82); Milan, Duchy of Milan
- Occupations: Catholic priest, emblematist, writer, preacher
- Known for: Il Mondo simbolico
- Title: abbot

Academic background
- Influences: Alciato; Valeriano

Academic work
- Era: Seicento
- Discipline: Iconography
- Influenced: Ménestrier

Filippo Picinelli C.R.S.A. (21 November 1604 – 1686) was an Italian Augustinian canon, scholar and emblematist. He is best known for his emblem book Il Mondo simbolico, printed in Milan in 1653, which enjoyed great success in Italy and throughout Europe.

== Biography ==
Little is known about the life of Picinelli. The main source of information on this author is the short biography that Picinelli himself includes in his Ateneo dei Letterati Milanesi, a bio-bibliographical dictionary of Milanese authors. He was born in Milan, Italy in November 1604. At baptism, he was named Carlo Francesco, but upon his entrance into the Augustinian Order (1614), his name was changed to Filippo. He studied philosophy in Cremona and theology in Piacenza, where he probably graduated. Once ordained a priest, he devoted himself to teaching in the colleges of his order; he also acquired a considerable reputation as a preacher. His preaching skills won him favour with several bishops, including Paolo Arese, bishop of Tortona, who encouraged Picinelli to publish his works. Later in his life, Picinelli was appointed abbot of Santa Maria della Passione in Milan. He died in Milan in 1686.

Picinelli published several works, in Latin and Italian, among which the following stand out: Applausi festivi o siano Panegirici varii (Venice, 1649), Foeminarum sacrae scripturae elogia (Milan, 1657), Lumi, e riflessi (Milan, 1667), Ateneo dei litterati milanesi, an important biographical source book for Milanese writers and artists (Milan, 1670), and Fatiche apostoliche (Milan, 1672–1674).

== Il Mondo simbolico ==
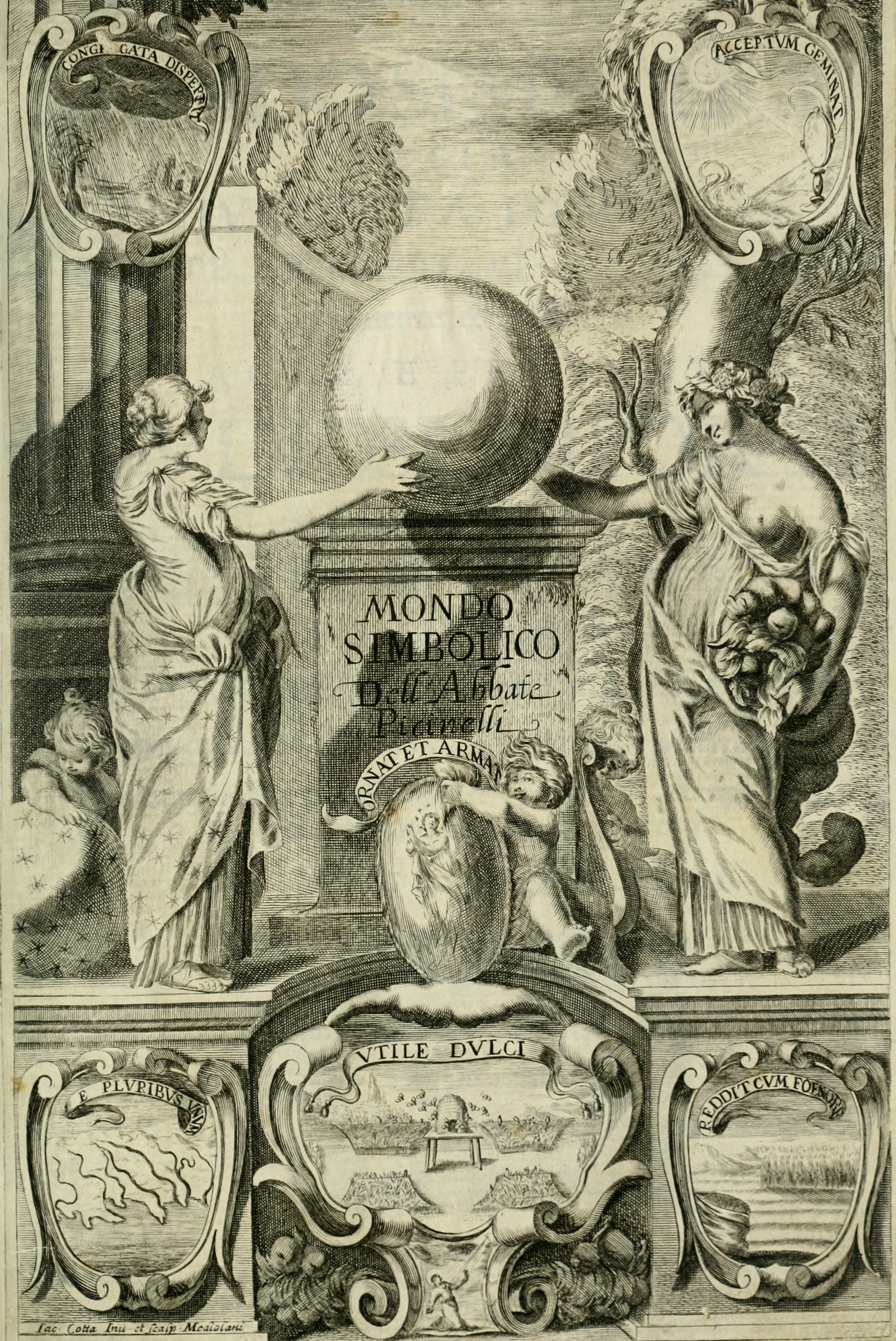
Frontispiece of Picinelli's Mondo Simbolico (Milan, 1653)

Picinelli believed that the world of God's creation could be read as a symbolic book. In 1653 he published his Mondo simbolico (Symbolic World), an encyclopaedia of emblems useful for scholars as a reference book. Picinelli's work was exceedingly popular among the intellectual elite of the Baroque era and went through several editions.

Picinelli's work is the culmination of a lifetime's erudition, drawing on many Renaissance emblem books and medieval encyclopedias and bestiaries. It was intended for "orators, preachers, academicians, and poets," and contained many examples drawn from the works of his predecessors, particularly Alciato and Valeriano. For the material for his encyclopaedic survey of symbols, Picinelli also drew on old manuscripts, some of them unpublished, from Italian monasteries.

Picinelli's Mondo simbolico is divided into two parts, one devoted to natural objects (Corpora Naturalia), and the other to artefacts (Corpora Artificialia).

Picinelli's work was translated into Latin by the Augustinian monk Augustinus Erath (1648–1729), and in the process also expanded. This expanded Latin edition (first published in Cologne in 1681) went through several new editions and can be regarded as the most comprehensive emblem encyclopedia of the seventeenth century. The comprehensiveness of Picinelli's work made it a model for subsequent scholars, including Claude-François Ménestrier, Johannes Michael von der Ketten, Arthur Henkel and Albrecht Schöne.

=== Books ===
- Ateneo dei letterati milanesi. Milan: Vigone. 1670.
- Foeminarum S. Scripturae Elogia: Centuria Singularis. Nuremberg: Ziegerus. 1694.
- Labores Apostolici. Vol. 1. Augsburg: Wohler. 1711.
- Lumina reflexa. Frankfurt: sumptibus societatis. 1702 [1667].
- Mundus Symbolicus. Vol. 1. Cologne: Hermann Demen. 1681 [1653].
- Mundus Symbolicus. Vol. 2. Cologne: Hermann Demen. 1687 [1653].
- Sacrarum religionum maximae. Augsburg: sumptibus Laurentii Kronigeri et Haeredum Theophili Goebelii. 1696.
- Symbola virginea. Augsburg: sumpt. Laur. Kronigeri & Haered. Theophilli Goebelii. 1694.
- Tributa encomiorum. Kempten: impensis Laurentij Kronigeri & Haeredum Theophili Goebelij. 1697.

== Bibliography ==
- López Poza, Sagrario (2000). "Los libros de emblemas como tesoros de erudición auxiliares de la inventio". In Rafael Zafra; José Javier Azanza (eds.). Emblemata Aurea. La emblemática en el arte y la literatura del Siglo de Oro. Madrid: Ediciones Akal. pp. 263–279. ISBN 978-84-460-1490-4.
- Mínguez, Víctor (2001). "El Sol y los astros en el Mundo Simbólico de Filippo Picinelli". Los reyes solares: iconografía astral de la monarquía hispánica. Castelló de la plana: Universitat Jaume I. pp. 99–108.
- Skinfill Nogal, Bárbara (2002). "Similitudo y exemplum senecanos en el Mundus Symbolicus de Filippo Picinelli". In Antonio Bernat Vistarini; John Cull (eds.). Los días del Alción. Emblemas, Literatura y Arte del Siglo de Oro. Palma de Mallorca: José J. de Olañeta. pp. 521–531. ISBN 978-84-9716-173-2.
- Picinelli, Filippo (1997–2006). El mundo simbólico. Eloy Gómez Bravo; Rosa Lucas González; Bárbara Skinfill Nogal (eds.). Zamora (México): El Colegio de Michoacán.
- Lucas González, Rosa (2002). "Presencia de Séneca en Picinelli". In Bárbara Skinfill Nogal; Eloy Gómez Bravo (eds.). Las dimensiones del arte emblemático. México: El Colegio de Michoacán y Consejo Nacional de Ciencia y Tecnología. pp. 103–110. ISBN 978-97-0679-097-2.
- Rueda Smithers, Salvador (2002). "El alimento de los sentidos. Notas sobre la lectura de emblemas y el Mundus symbolicus de Filippo Picinelli". In Bárbara Skinfill Nogal; Eloy Gómez Bravo (eds.). Las dimensiones del arte emblemático. México: El Colegio de Michoacán y Consejo Nacional de Ciencia y Tecnología. pp. 111–121. ISBN 978-97-0679-097-2.
- Manning, John (2004). The Emblem. London: Reaktion Books. p. 127. ISBN 978-1861891983.
- Michelacci, Lara (2018). "Animaux et hommes dans Le Mondo Simbolico (1653) de Filippo Picinelli". In Fernando Copello; Sandra Contamina (eds.). L'animal et l'homme dans leurs représentations. Ponts et frontiéres. Rennes: Presses Universitaires de Rennes. pp. 109–121. ISBN 978-2753574274.
