= Jean de Tournes (1539–1615) =

Swiss–French author, publisher, editor, bookseller

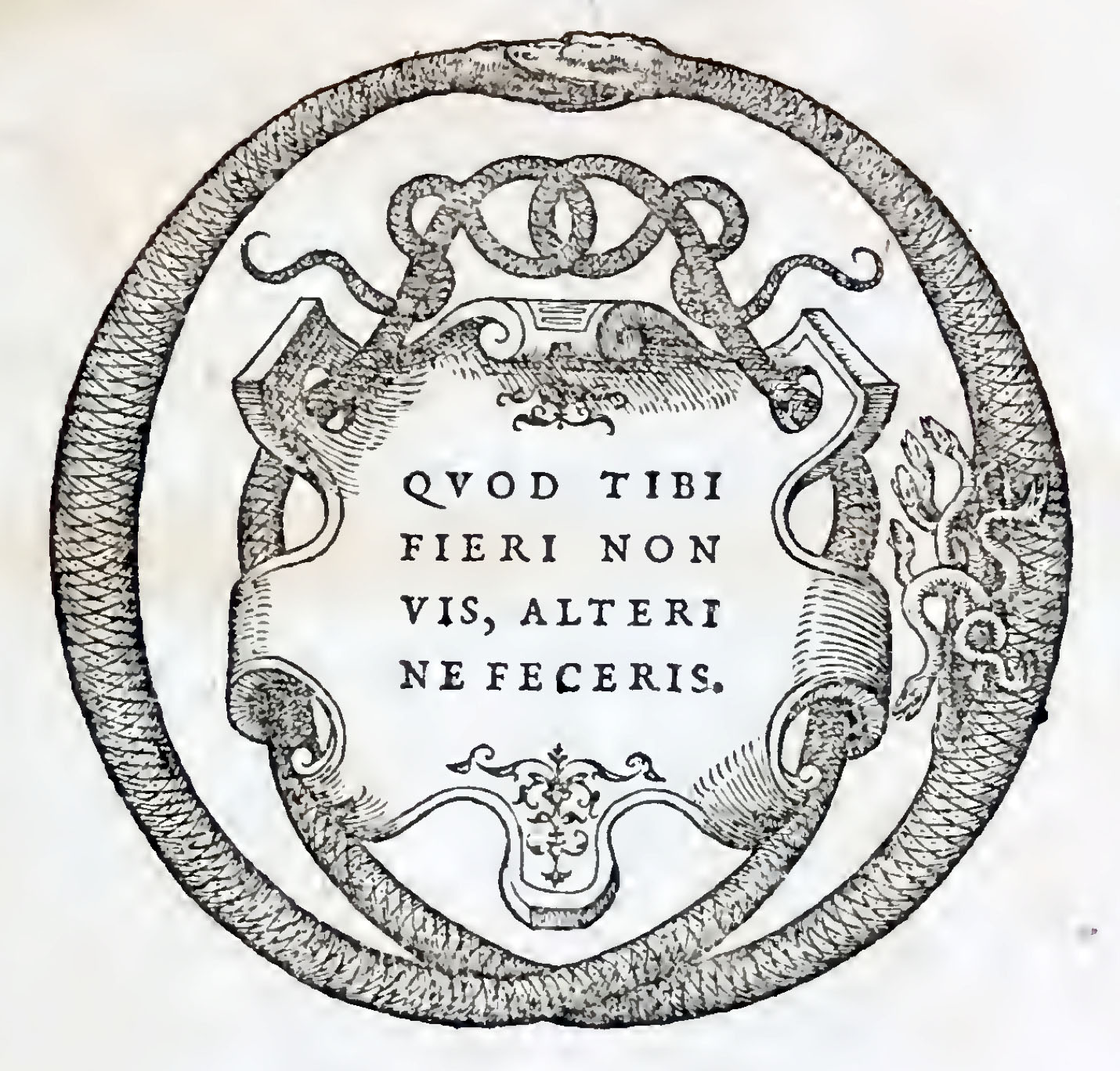
- Device and motto of the printing house of Jean de Tournes, from M. Vitrvvii Pollionis De architectvra libri decem, ad Caes. Avgvstvm, omnibus omnium editionibus longè emendatiores, collatis veteribus exemplis (1586), reprint of the 1552 edition (last leaf, unnumbered)
- Born: 1539
- Died: 1615 (aged 75–76)
- Other names: Jean Detournes; Joannes Tornaesius; Jean De Tournes
- Occupations: Author, publisher, editor, bookseller

Jean de Tournes (1539–1615) was a French author, printer, book publisher and bookseller, and member of the long-lasting family printing business founded by his father Jean de Tournes. After his father's death in 1564 he was the imprimeur du Roi, printer to the French king. He was the father of Jean de Tournes (1593–1669).

== Life ==
Jean de Tournes was born in 1539. He took over his father's printing and publishing business in 1564. He was a Huguenot protestant. In 1567, during the French Wars of Religion, his press was sacked and he was imprisoned for two months. He was imprisoned again in 1572, but escaped the Saint Bartholemew's Day Massacre. In 1585, following the edict of Henri III that protestants must abjure their religion or leave the country, he moved to Geneva. He began printing there in about 1590. He became a bourgeois in 1596, and a member of the Conseil des Deux Cents in 1604. He died in 1615 and was succeeded in the family firm by his son Jean de Tournes.

The emblem of the de Tournes press was two entwined vipers. Their mottoes included Nescit labi virtus; Son art en Dieu; Quod tibi fieri non-vis, alteri ne feceris and Virum de mille unum reperi.
