= Jean de Tournes (1504–1564) =

French printer, book publisher and bookseller (1504–1564)

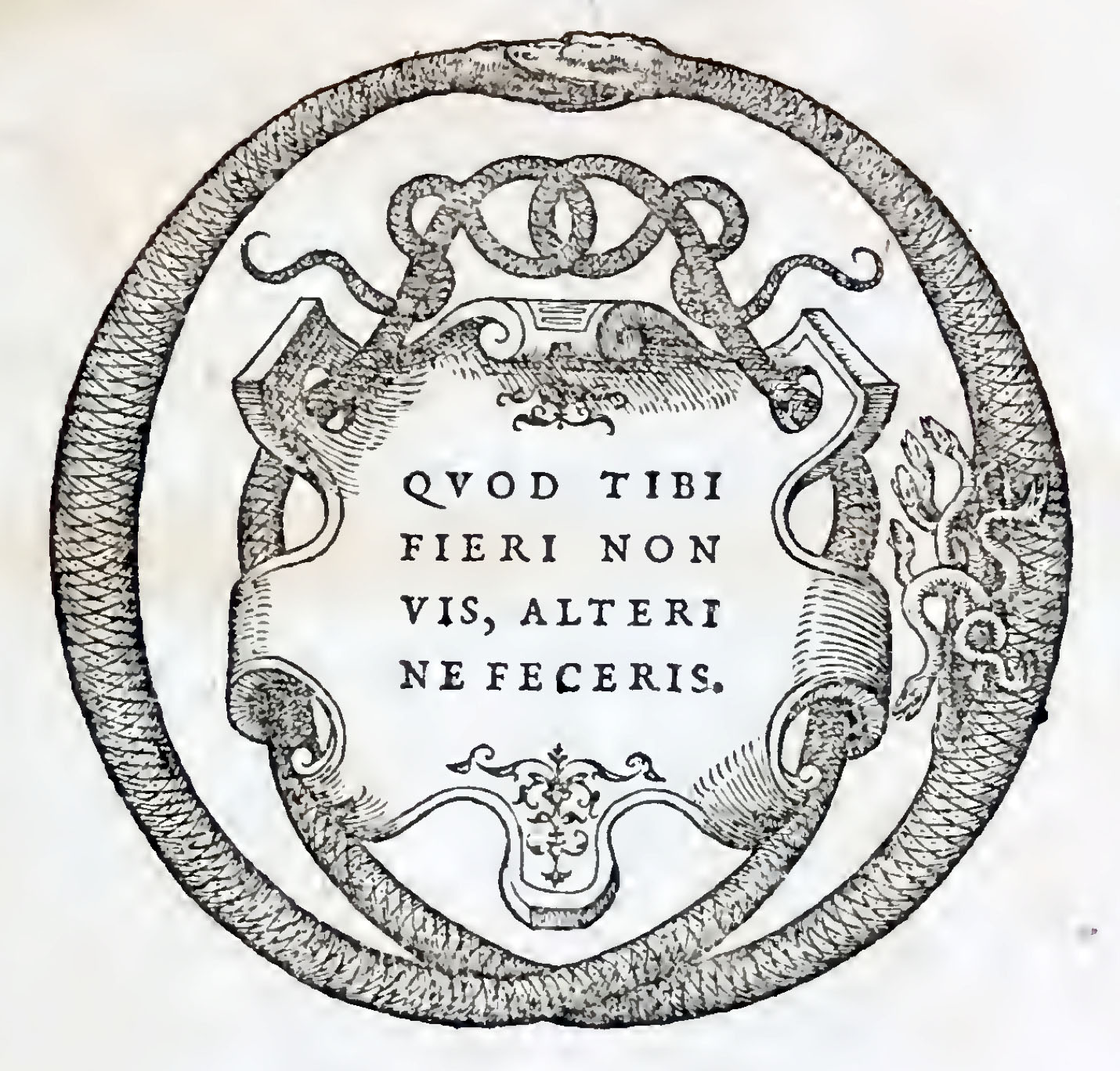
- Device and motto of the printing house of Jean de Tournes, from M. Vitrvvii Pollionis De architectvra libri decem, ad Caes. Avgvstvm, omnibus omnium editionibus longè emendatiores, collatis veteribus exemplis (1586), reprint of the 1552 edition (last leaf, unnumbered).
- Born: 1504; Lyon, France
- Died: 1564 (aged 59–60); Lyon
- Other names: Jean Detourne; Joannes Tornaesius; G. de Tournes
- Occupations: printer, publisher, bookseller

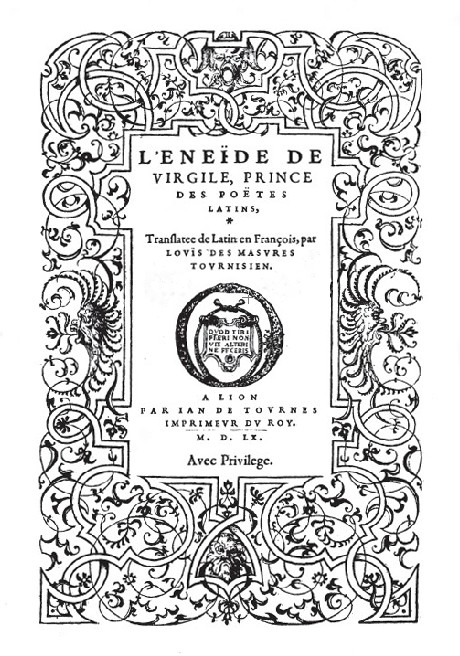
Title-page of the Aeneid of Vergil, translated into French by Louis des Masures, published by Jean de Tournes in 1552

Jean de Tournes (French pronunciation: [ʒɑ̃ də tuʁn]; 1504–1564) was a French printer, book publisher and bookseller, and the founder of a long-lasting family printing business. From 1559 he was the imprimeur du Roi, printer to the French king.

== Life ==
Jean de Tournes was born in Lyon in 1504. He was apprenticed in the printing workshop of Gaspard and Melchior Trechsel, and then worked for about ten years as a compositor in the workshops of Sébastien Gryphe. In 1542 de Tournes set up his own shop, where from 1547 until 1563 he was in partnership with his son-in-law Guillaume Gazeau. He was a learned humanist, and published accurate editions of works of both ancient and modern authors. Until 1547 he employed the engraver Georges Riverdy for illustrated works; after that date he used the noted engraver Bernard Salomon. He converted to Protestantism in about 1545.

Jean de Tournes died of plague in Lyon on 7 September 1564. He was succeeded in the business by his son Jean de Tournes. In 1585 the family and the printing works moved to Geneva in order to escape religious persecution as Huguenots in the French Wars of Religion. In 1727 they returned to Lyon, and in 1906 they were among the founders of the Imprimeries réunies in that city.

The emblem of the de Tournes press was two entwined vipers. Their mottoes included Nescit labi virtus; Son art en Dieu; Per ipsum facta sunt omnia; Quod tibi fieri non vis, alteri ne feceris and Virum de mille unum reperi.

== Publications ==
Jean de Tournes published many of the Lyonnais poets of his generation, including Antoine Du Moulin, Maurice Scève, Louise Labé, Joachim du Bellay and Olivier de Magny. He published accurate editions of the works of authors including Petrarch (1545), Dante (1547), Marguerite de Navarre (1547), Vitruvius (1552) and Froissart (1559–1561). He published numerous works in Latin, Italian and other languages, including a Latin version of Guillaume Le Sueur's account of the Martin Guerre affair (1561). Illustrated books from his press include the Emblemata of Andrea Alciati (1547), Aesop's Fables (1547), the Quadrins historiques de la Bible (1553) and the Metamorphoses of Ovid (1557).
