= Sebastian Gryphius =

German bookseller-printer and humanist

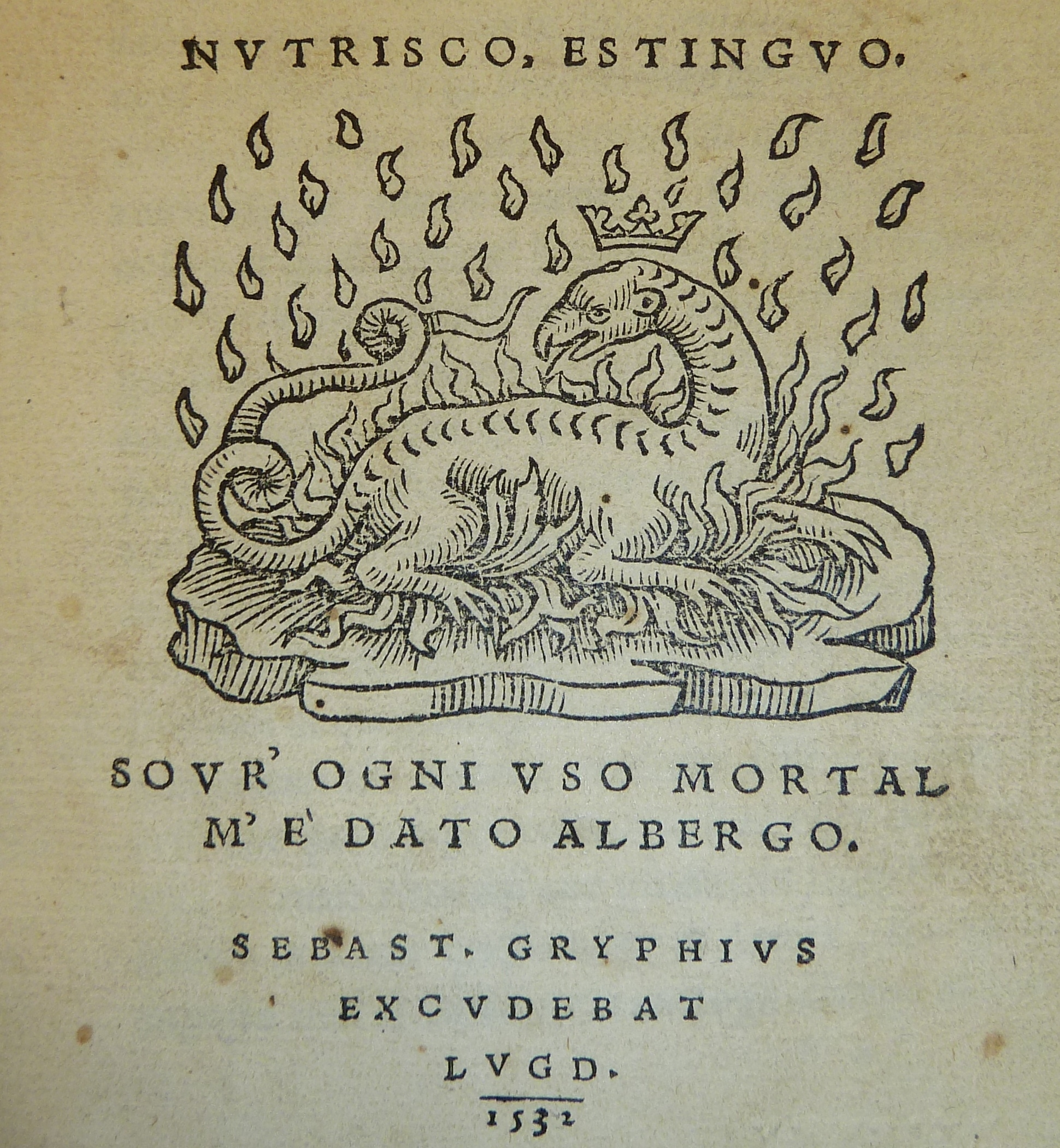
The device of Sebastianus Gryphius in a 1532 book

Sebastian Gryphius (French: Sébastien Gryphe; c. 1493, in Reutlingen – 7 September 1556, in Lyon) was the head of a printing house in Lyon and a humanist.

== Biography ==
The son of Michael Greyff (Greif, Gryff, Gryph), Sebastien Gryphius learned the new craft of printing, first in Germany and then in Venice. Around 1520 he came to Lyon where he settled, likely on the request of the Compagnie de libraires, eventually acquiring French nationality from François I in 1532.

Initially Gryphius primarily published works on law and administration, in Gothic script. He then moved to Latin classics. He also translated classical Greek authors into Latin. He is perhaps best-known today for having published his contemporaries Erasmus, Guillaume Budé, Philip Melanchthon, and Poliziano.

Gryphius was a prolific publisher on language and philology, and had an excellent reputation for type-setting accuracy. While Santes Pagninus was in Lyon, Gryphius published not only an abridged version of his 1526 Institutiones Hebraicae in Greek, Hebrew and Latin in 1528, but also his seminal 1412-page Thesaurus linguæ sanctæ in 1529 and in the following year, the first Hebrew text of the Psalms published in France and translated by Pagninus.

In 1536 he went into business with Hugues de la Porte, who financed him in an independent venture. He founded l'Atelier du Griffon, with a griffin mark. Around this time he introduced an Italic type modelled on that of Aldus Manutius.

In the 1540s he was the highly reputed 'Prince of the Lyon book trade', publishing (on Lucien Febvre's estimate) half of the academic textbooks used in Europe. He promoted the local humanist culture, and his books were prized for their clean lay-out and accuracy. It has been claimed, as the nineteenth-century scholar Henri-Louis Baudrier mentions, that Sebastian Gryphius's printshop (Atelier du Griffon) was characterized as an "angelic society" for free-thinkers, citing Pierre Gauthiez, but Baudrier considers this naming to be sloppy scholarship born of confusion with another coterie of writers known as the Fourvière academy.

His collaborators included André Alciat, François Rabelais, Étienne Dolet, Maurice Scève and Barthélemy Aneau, and they wrote highly of his work, even helping out in practical printing tasks. Their linguistic input and commentary greatly enriched the works printed. Gryphius also published texts which were later added to the Catholic Church's index as heretical, like for example Girolamo Savonarola's Dominicæ Precationis Explanatio.

From 1534-1538, on the recommendation of Jean de Boyssoné, he collaborated with and published Étienne Dolet, an academic and satirical poet, who arrived in Lyon in 1534 after being freed from jail in Toulouse. After publishing the speeches that landed Dolet in prison in Toulouse and, surprisingly given his close ties to Erasmus, the virulent anti-Erasmian Dialogus, de imitatione ciceroniana adversus Desiderium Erasmum, and the book that first made Dolet's scholarly reputation Commentarii linguae latinae (Commentaires sur la langue latine), Gryphius continued to allow Dolet (who held a royal publishing privilege from 1538) to publish using his workshop. The first edition of Carmina was thus published with Dolet's device, but from Gryphe's workshop. Soon, however, the two parted ways, and Dolet began releasing editions of many of Dolet's most successful publications with little or no change, to the point that modern scholars speak of piracy. By 1546, Dolet's friends in high places could no longer protect him and he was burned in Paris as a heretic.

From 1540, Rabelais came to Gryphius to publish his translations of Hippocrates, Galen and Giovanni Mainardi and collaborated with him extensively particularly on texts related to medicine, but also on his edition of Macrobius.

== Family ==
Sebastien Gryphius' brother Franz (François) was also a printer in the rue des Carmes in Paris from 1532–1545, while another relative, Johann (Jean), ran a publishing house in Venice from 1540, which stayed in business until 1585. Both publishing houses borrowed the Lyonnais' device (a griffon on a cube and a globe) and likely sought thereby to take advantage of their better-known relative's reputation. His illegitimate son Antoine (1527?-1599) succeeded him at his printing shop in Lyon. Antoine Gryphius was the father of Sébastien II Gryphius, born around 1570, a bookseller in Lyon and later in Bordeaux.

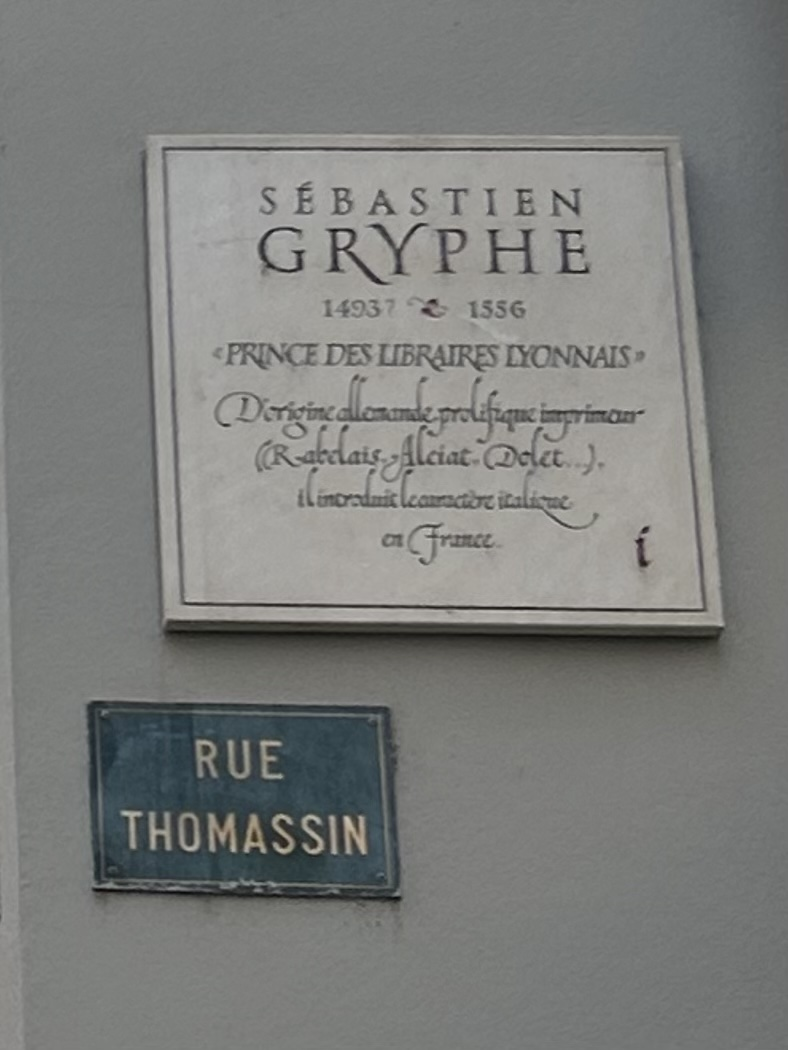
Sebastien Gryphe Historical Marker on Rue Thomassin (Lyon, France)

== Legacy ==
- There is a street named after him in Lyon.
- The journal of the Bibliothèque municipale de Lyon is called Gryphe.
