= Emblem =

Pictorial image that epitomizes a concept or that represents a person

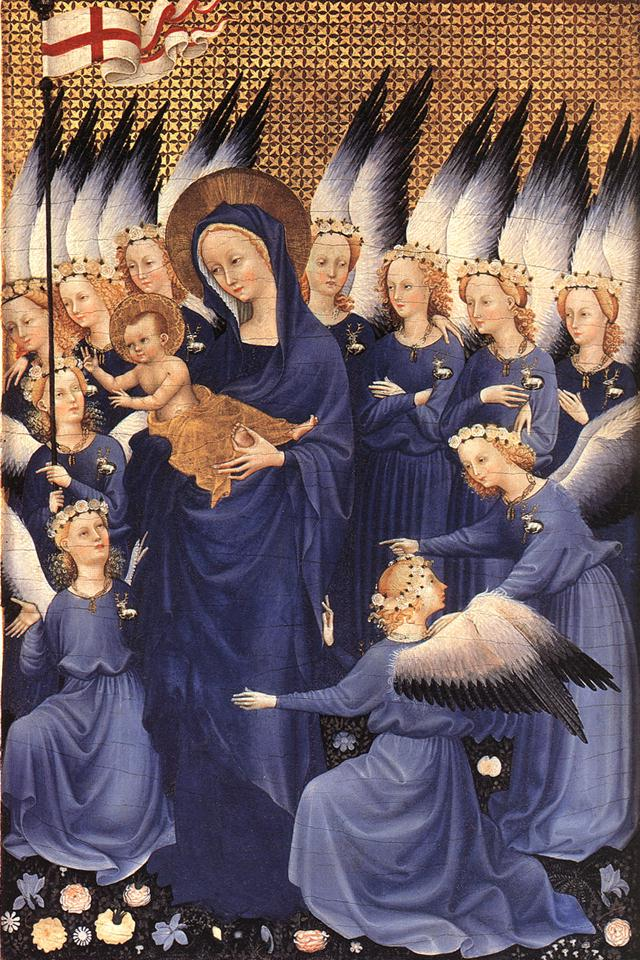
The Wilton Diptych (c. 1395–1399) features angels wearing the White Hart badge, the personal emblem of King Richard II of England

The national emblem of Uzbekistan

The family emblem of the fictional House of El

An emblem is an abstract or representational pictorial image that represents a concept, such as moral truth, allegory, or person, such as a monarch or saint.

== Emblems vs. symbols ==
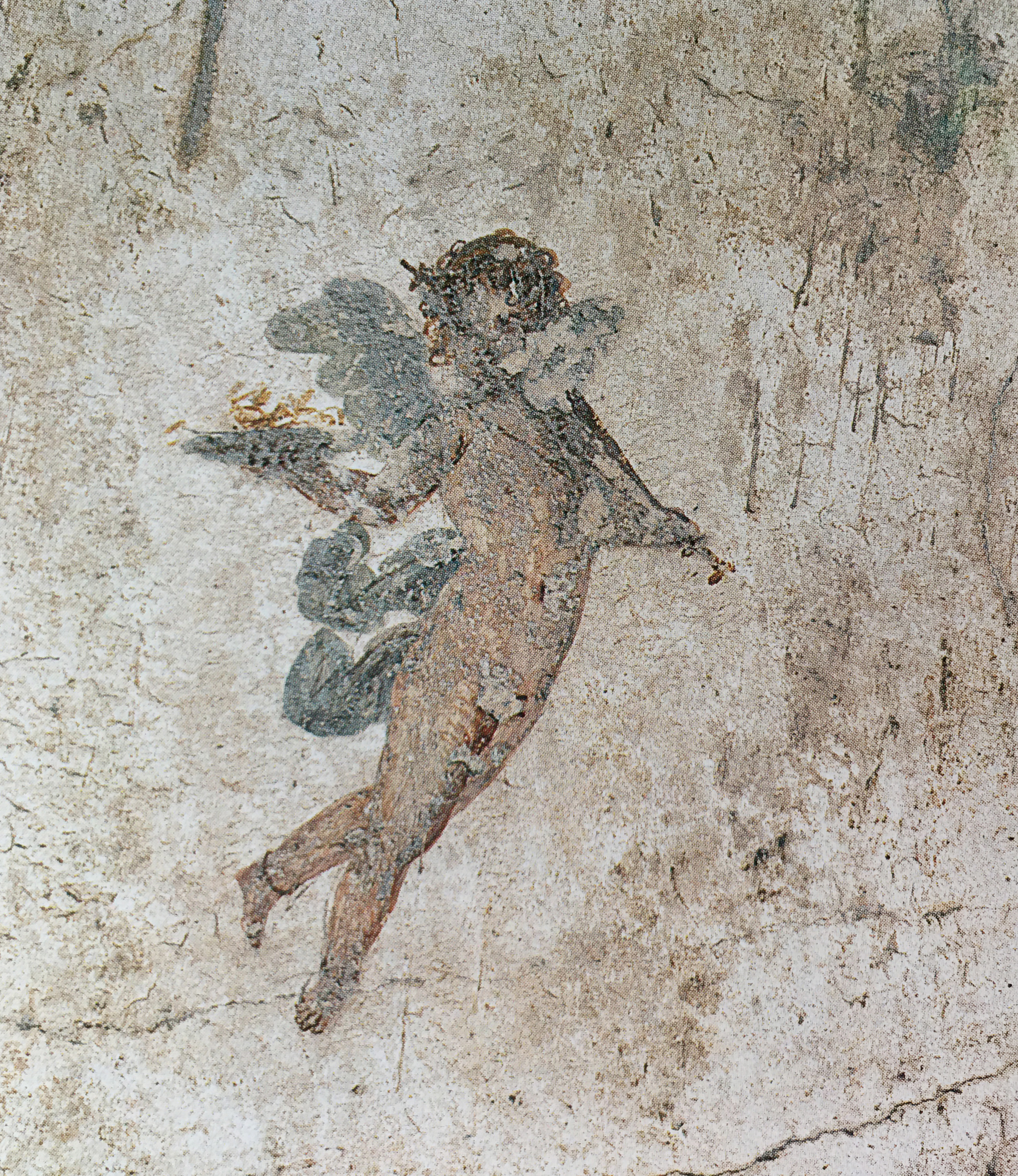
House of the Prince of Naples in Pompeii Triclinium Emblem on North Wall

Although the words emblem and symbol are often used interchangeably, an emblem is a pattern that is used to represent an idea or an individual. An emblem develops in concrete, visual terms some abstraction: a deity, a tribe or nation, or a virtue or vice.

An emblem may be worn or otherwise used as an identifying badge or patch. For example, in the United States, police officers' badges refer to their personal metal emblem whereas their woven emblems on uniforms identify members of a particular unit. A real or metal cockle shell, the emblem of James the Great, sewn onto the hat or clothes, identified a medieval pilgrim to his shrine at Santiago de Compostela. In the Middle Ages, many saints were given emblems, which served to identify them in paintings and other images: St. Catherine of Alexandria had a wheel, or a sword, St. Anthony the Abbot, a pig and a small bell. These are also called attributes, especially when shown carried by or close to the saint in art. Monarchs and other grand persons increasingly adopted personal devices or emblems that were distinct from their family heraldry. The most famous include Louis XIV of France's sun, the salamander of Francis I of France, the boar of Richard III of England and the armillary sphere of Manuel I of Portugal. In the fifteenth and sixteenth century, there was a fashion, started in Italy, for making large medals with a portrait head on the obverse and the emblem on the reverse; these would be given to friends and as diplomatic gifts. Pisanello produced many of the earliest and finest of these.

A symbol, on the other hand, substitutes one thing for another, in a more concrete fashion:

- The Christian cross is a symbol of the crucifixion of Jesus; it is an emblem of sacrifice.
- The Red Cross is one of three symbols representing the International Red Cross. A red cross on a white background is the emblem of humanitarian spirit.
- The crescent shape is a symbol of the moon; it is an emblem of Islam.
- The skull and crossbones is a symbol identifying a poison. The skull is an emblem of the transitory nature of human life.

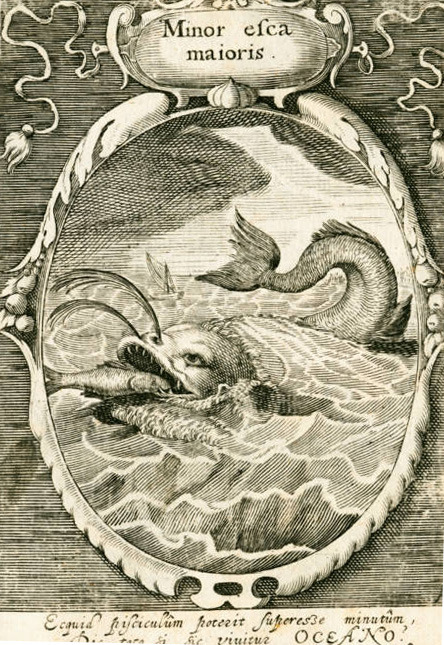
"The big eat the small", a political emblem from an emblem book, 1617

== Other terminology ==
The coat of arms of Estonia with the national emblem of three lions passant.

A totem is specifically an animal emblem that expresses the spirit of a clan. Emblems in heraldry are known as charges. The lion passant serves as the emblem of England, the lion rampant as the emblem of Scotland.

An icon consists of an image (originally a religious image), that has become standardized by convention. A logo is an impersonal, secular icon, usually of a corporate entity.

== Emblems in history ==
Since the 15th century, the terms of emblem (emblema; from Greek: ἔμβλημα, meaning "embossed ornament") and emblematura belong to the termini technici of architecture. They mean an iconic painted, drawn, or sculptural representation of a concept affixed to houses and belong—like the inscriptions—to the architectural ornaments (ornamenta). Since the publication of De re aedificatoria (1452) by Leon Battista Alberti (1404–1472), patterned after the De architectura by the Roman architect and engineer Vitruvius, emblema are related to Egyptian hieroglyphics and are considered as being the lost universal language. Therefore, the emblems belong to the Renaissance knowledge of antiquity which comprises not only Greek and Roman antiquity but also Egyptian antiquity as proven by the numerous obelisks built in 16th and 17th century Rome.

Glyph emblem of the Mayan city of Copán in Honduras, installed by the Yax Kuk Mo Dynasty.

Evidence of the use of emblems in pre-Columbian America has also been found, such as those used in Mayan city states, kingdoms, and even empires such as the Aztec or Inca. The use of these in the American context does not differ much from the contexts of other regions of the world, being even the equivalent of the coats of arms of their respective territorial entities.

The 1531 publication in Augsburg of the first emblem book, the Emblemata of the Italian jurist Andrea Alciato launched a fascination with emblems that lasted two centuries and touched most of the countries of western Europe. "Emblem" in this sense refers to a didactic or moralizing combination of picture and text intended to draw the reader into a self-reflective examination of their own life. Complicated associations of emblems could transmit information to the culturally-informed viewer, a characteristic of the 16th-century artistic movement called Mannerism.

A popular collection of emblems, which ran to many editions, was presented by Francis Quarles in 1635. Each of the emblems consisted of a paraphrase from a passage of Scripture, expressed in ornate and metaphorical language, followed by passages from the Christian Fathers, and concluding with an epigram of four lines. These were accompanied by an emblem that presented the symbols displayed in the accompanying passage.

== Emblems in speech ==
Emblems are certain gestures which have a specific meaning attached to them. These meanings are usually associated with the culture they are established in. Using emblems creates a way for humans to communicate with one another in a non-verbal way. An individual waving their hand at a friend, for example, would communicate "hello" without having to verbally say anything.

=== Emblems vs. sign language ===
Although sign language uses hand gestures to communicate words in a non-verbal way, it should not be confused with emblems. Sign language contains linguistic properties, similar to those used in verbal languages, and is used to communicate entire conversations. Linguistic properties are verbs, nouns, pronouns, adverbs, adjectives, etc.. In contrast with sign language, emblems are a non-linguistic form of communication. Emblems are single gestures which are meant to get a short non-verbal message to another individual.

== Emblems in culture ==
Emblems are associated with the culture they are established in and are subjective to that culture. For example, the sign made by forming a circle with the thumb and forefinger is used in America to communicate "OK" in a non-verbal way, in Japan to mean "money", and in some southern European countries to mean something sexual. Furthermore, the thumbs up sign in America means "good job ", but in some parts of the Middle East the thumbs up sign means something highly offensive.

== See also ==
- Coat of arms
- Crest
- Emblem book
- Logo
- Meme
- Mission patch
- National emblem
- Saint symbology
- Seal (emblem)
- Symbol
- Badge
- Icon
