= Henri-Louis Baudrier =

French bibliographer and magistrate (1815 - 1884)

Henri-Louis Baudrier (pronounced [bo.dʁi.je]; 29 May 1815 – 17 June 1884) was a French bibliographer and magistrate, and the co-author of Bibliographie lyonnaise: recherches sur les imprimeurs, libraires, relieurs et fondeurs de lettres de Lyon au XVIe siècle par le Président Baudrier, publiées et continuées par J. Baudrier, (Note: transl. Bibliography of Lyon: Research on the printers, booksellers, bookbinders, and founders of letters in Lyon in the 16th century by President Baudrier, published and continued by J. Baudrier; "J. Baudrier" refers to Henri-Louis Baudrier's son, Julien Baudrier (1860–1915).) an encyclopaedic work published in eleven volumes between 1895 and 1914. The work focused on the bookselling and publishing industry of 16th-century Lyon, featuring entries on more than 2,000 individuals, many of whom were printers, bookbinders, and booksellers based in Lyon.

Born into a family of magistrates in Lyon, Baudrier embarked on his judicial career in 1846 as a substitute judge, though he was dismissed just two years later. By 1849, he had been reinstated as a magistrate, eventually rising to the position of Court Counsellor (conseiller à la Cour) in 1856 and President of the Chamber (président de chambre) in 1869.

A bibliophile and avid book collector, Baudrier amassed a library of more than 8,000 volumes, primarily composed of 15th and 16th-century Lyonnais imprints. He died in Paris in 1884.
