= Emblemata =

1531 German book of emblems

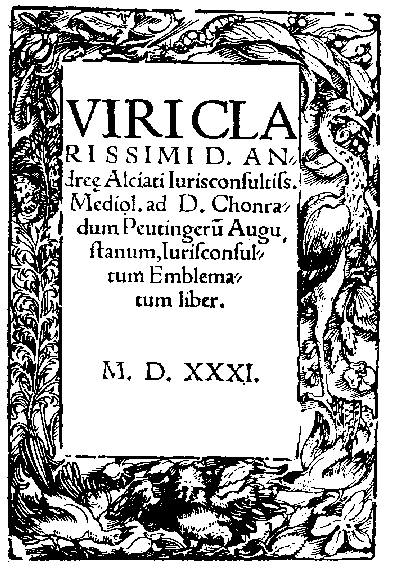
- Title page of original edition.
- Author: Andrea Alciato
- Original title: Viri Clarissimi
- Illustrator: Jörg Breu the Elder
- Language: Latin
- Published: 1531
- Publisher: Heinrich Steyner

The Emblemata, or Emblematum liber first appeared in Augsburg (Germany) in 1531 under the title Viri Clarissimi D. Andreae Alciati Iurisconsultiss. Mediol. Ad D. Chonradum Peutingerum Augustanum, Iurisconsultum Emblematum Liber. Produced by the publisher Heinrich Steyner, the unauthorized first print edition was compiled from a manuscript of Latin poems which the Italian jurist Andrea Alciato had dedicated to his friend Conrad Peutinger and circulated to his acquaintances. The 1531 edition was soon followed by a 1534 edition authorized by Alciato: published in Paris by Christian Wechel, this appeared under the title Andreae Alciati Emblematum Libellus ("Andrea Alciato's Little Book of Emblems"). The word "emblemata" is the plural of the Greek word ἔμβλημα, meaning a piece of inlay or mosaic, or an ornament: in his preface to Peutinger, Alciato describes his emblems as a learned recreation, a pastime for humanists steeped in classical culture.

== History ==
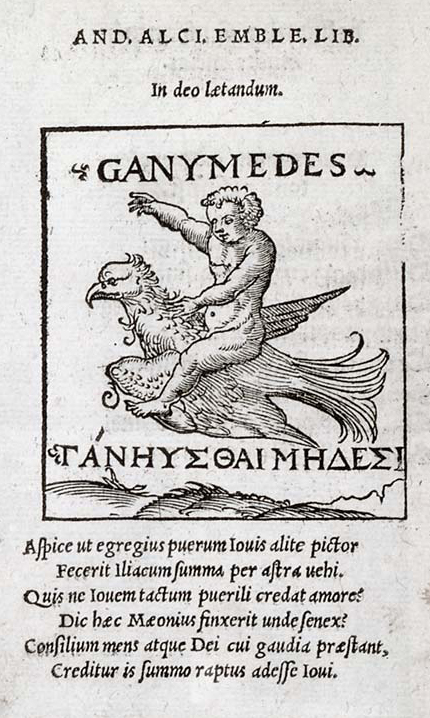
"In Deo Laetandum" (about taking joy from God) from Emblemata.

The first version of Alciati's emblem-book contained 104 emblems without illustrations. It was Heinrich Steyner who made the crucial decision that each emblem should be illustrated and commissioned the engravings from Jörg Breu the Elder. The success of the Emblematum liber was immediate.

The Emblemata soon grew to include over 200 individual emblems and appeared in hundreds of editions, of which probably the best known is that published in Padua by Tozzi in 1621, the Emblemata Cum Commentariis Amplissimis. The "very full commentaries" to which the title refers were written by the French scholar Claude Mignault. Alciato's work spawned thousands of imitations in all the European vernacular languages: secular, religious, or amorous in nature, emblem books were an integral part of European culture for two centuries.

Alciati corresponded with Erasmus and Konrad Peutinger. The preface to Emblemata is dedicated to Peutinger:

"While boys are entertained by nuts and youths by dice, so playing-cards fill up the time of lazy men. In the festive season we hammer out these emblems, made by the distinguished hand of craftsmen. Just as one affixes trimmings to clothes and badges to hats, so it behooves every one of us to write in silent marks. Though the supreme emperor may give to you, for you to own, precious coins and finest objects of the ancients, I myself shall give, one poet to another, paper gifts: take these, Konrad, the token of my love."

== Form ==
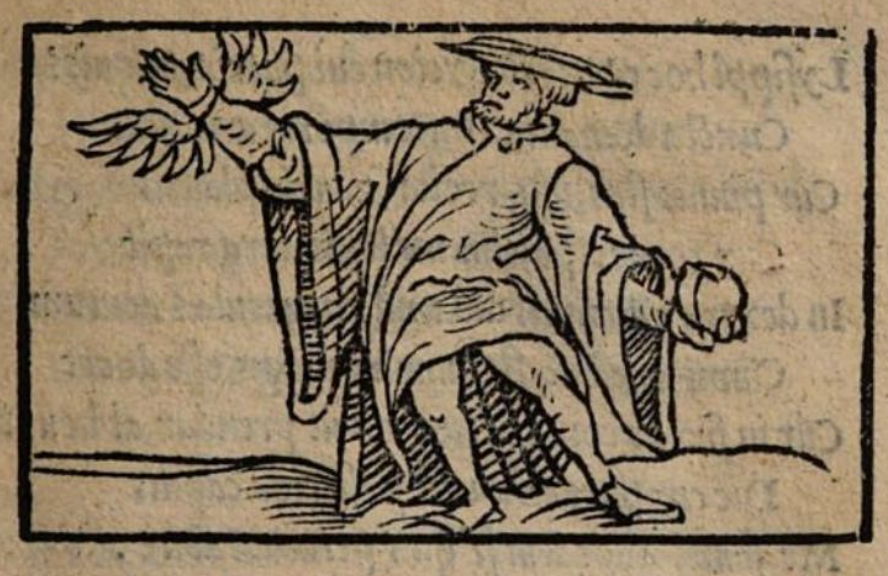
"Paupertatum summis ingeniis obesse ne provehantur" from Emblemata.

Alciati's Emblemata have three basic components. The inscription is a short motto which sums up the point of the emblem. It is paired with an illustration of a scene, often derived from mythology. The inscribed image was known as an impresa and was a common genre. The third part of an emblem was its short descriptive text, the subscriptio. The text often took the form of an epigram.

One inscription reads, "Paupertatum summis ingeniis obesse ne provehantur" (Poverty is a hindrance to the highest talents, lest they be promoted). The image by Jörg Breu the Elder depicts a man with a heavy stone in one hand and wings on the other.

Alciati's description imagines the man's lament, "By means of my innate talent I could fly around the highest citadels, that is, were I not oppressed by an inopportune poverty".

== See also ==
- Adagia
- Greek Anthology
- Ship of Fools (satire)

== Bibliography ==
- Alciati, Andrea (2004). Moffitt, John F. (ed.). A Book of Emblems: The Emblematum Liber in Latin and English. Jefferson, NC: McFarland. ISBN 0786418079.
- Moffitt, John F. (2004). "Introduction". A Book of Emblems: The Emblematum Liber in Latin and English. Jefferson, NC: McFarland. ISBN 0786418079.
