= Andrea Alciato =

Italian jurist and writer (1492–1550)

Doctor Andrea Alciato
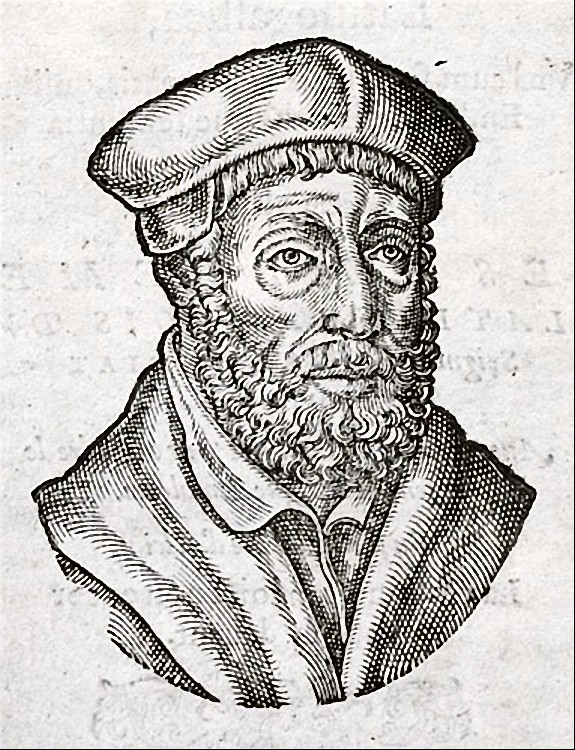
- Portrait of Andrea Alciato, reproduced from the 1584 edition of his emblem book
- Born: Giovanni Andrea Alciato; May 8, 1492; Alzate Brianza, Duchy of Milan
- Died: 12 January 1550 (aged 57); Pavia, Duchy of Milan
- Resting place: Chiesa di Sant'Epifanio
- Occupations: Jurist, university teacher, lawyer, writer
- Parent(s): Ambrogio Alciati and Margherita Alciati (née Landriani)
- Relatives: Francesco Alciati

Academic background
- Education: University of Pavia; University of Bologna; University of Ferrara
- Influences: Seneca, Tacitus, Tribonian, Bartolus de Saxoferrato, Erasmus

Academic work
- Discipline: Civilist, legal theorist, philosopher of law
- School or tradition: Mos gallicus iura docendi
- Institutions: Avignon University; University of Bourges; University of Pavia; University of Bologna; University of Ferrara
- Notable students: Bonifacius Amerbach, Viglius, François Connan, Johannes Secundus, Antonio Agustín y Albanell, Giulio Claro
- Notable works: Emblemata (1531)
- Influenced: French school of legal humanism

Andrea Alciato (8 May 1492 – 12 January 1550), commonly known as Alciati (Andreas Alciatus), was an Italian jurist and writer. He is regarded as the founder of the French school of legal humanists.

== Biography ==
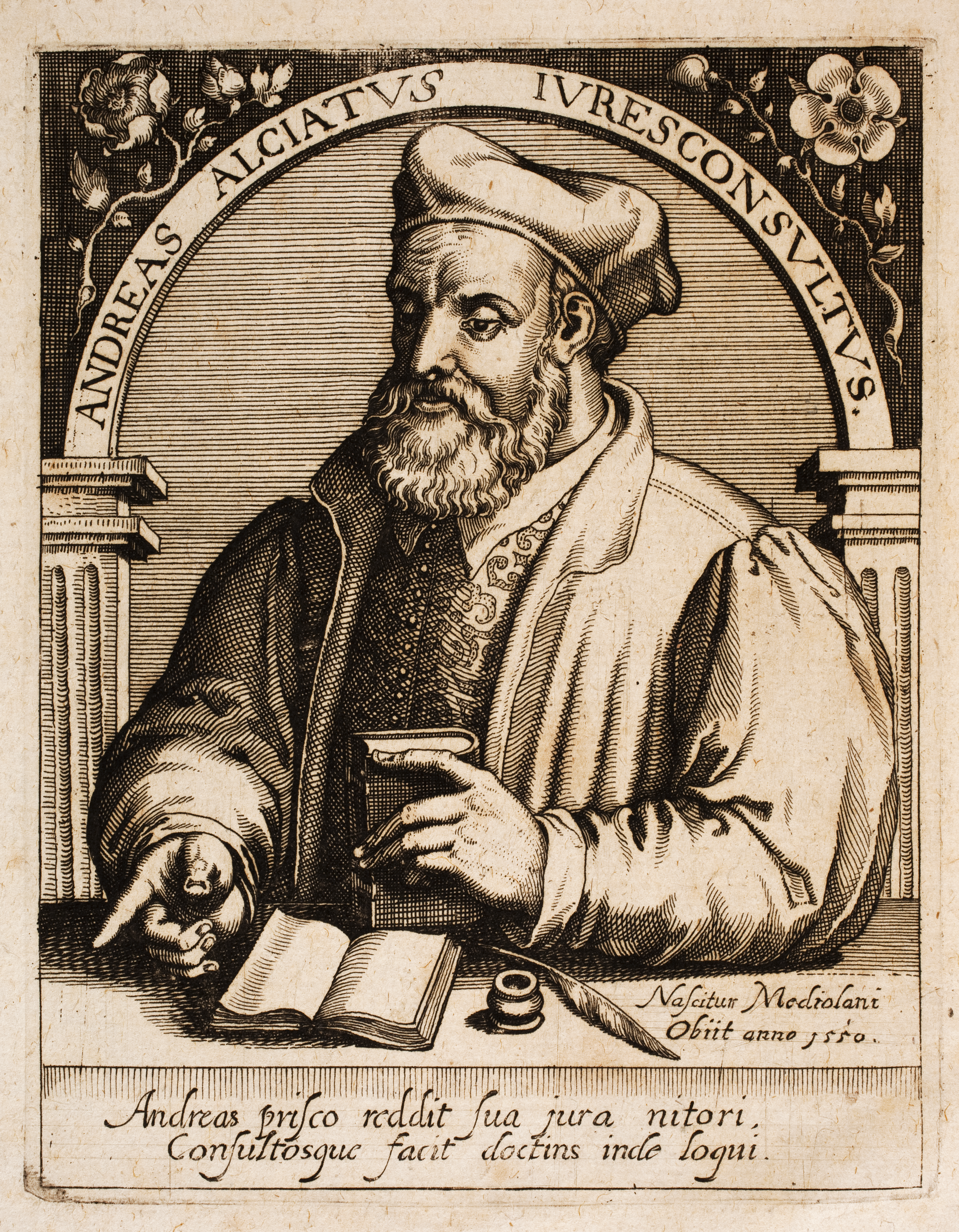
Engraving of Andrea Alciato

Alciati was born in Alzate Brianza, near Milan, and settled in France in the early 16th century. He displayed great literary skill in his exposition of the laws, and was one of the first to interpret the civil law by the history, languages and literature of antiquity, and to substitute original research for the servile interpretations of the glossators. He published many legal works, and some annotations on Tacitus and accumulated a sylloge of Roman inscriptions from Milan and its territories, as part of his preparation for his history of Milan, written in 1504–05.

Among his several appointments, Alciati taught law at the University of Bourges between 1529 and 1535. It was Guillaume Budé who encouraged the call to Bourges at the time. Pierre Bayle, in his General Dictionary (article "Alciat"), relates that he greatly increased his salary there, by the "stratagem" of arranging to get a job offer from the University of Bologna and using it as a negotiation point . At this time, Alciato received a royal pension of 400 livres tournois.

Alciati is most famous for his Emblemata, published in dozens of editions from 1531 onward. This collection of short Latin verse texts and accompanying woodcuts created an entire European genre, the emblem book, which attained enormous popularity in continental Europe and Great Britain.

Alciati died at Pavia in 1550. His heir, Francesco Alciati, commissioned a huge mausoleum in the Church of S. Epifanio.

== Works ==
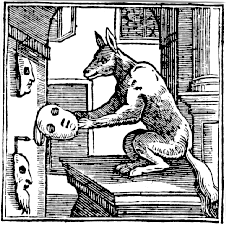
Emblem 189: Mentem, non formam, plus pollere ("mind, not outward form, prevails")

- Annotationes in tres libros Codicis (1515)
- Emblematum libellus (1531)
- De ponderibus et mensuris (in Latin). Venezia: Melchiorre Sessa. 1532.
- Opera omnia (Basel 1546–49)
- Rerum Patriae, seu Historiae Mediolanensis, Libri IV (Milan, 1625) a history of the region of Milan during Antiquity, written in 1504–05.
- De formula Romani Imperii (Basilae: Ioannem Oporinum, 1559, editio princeps)
- In Digestorum titulos aliquot commentaria (in Latin). Vol. 1. Lyon: Compagnie des libraires. 1560.
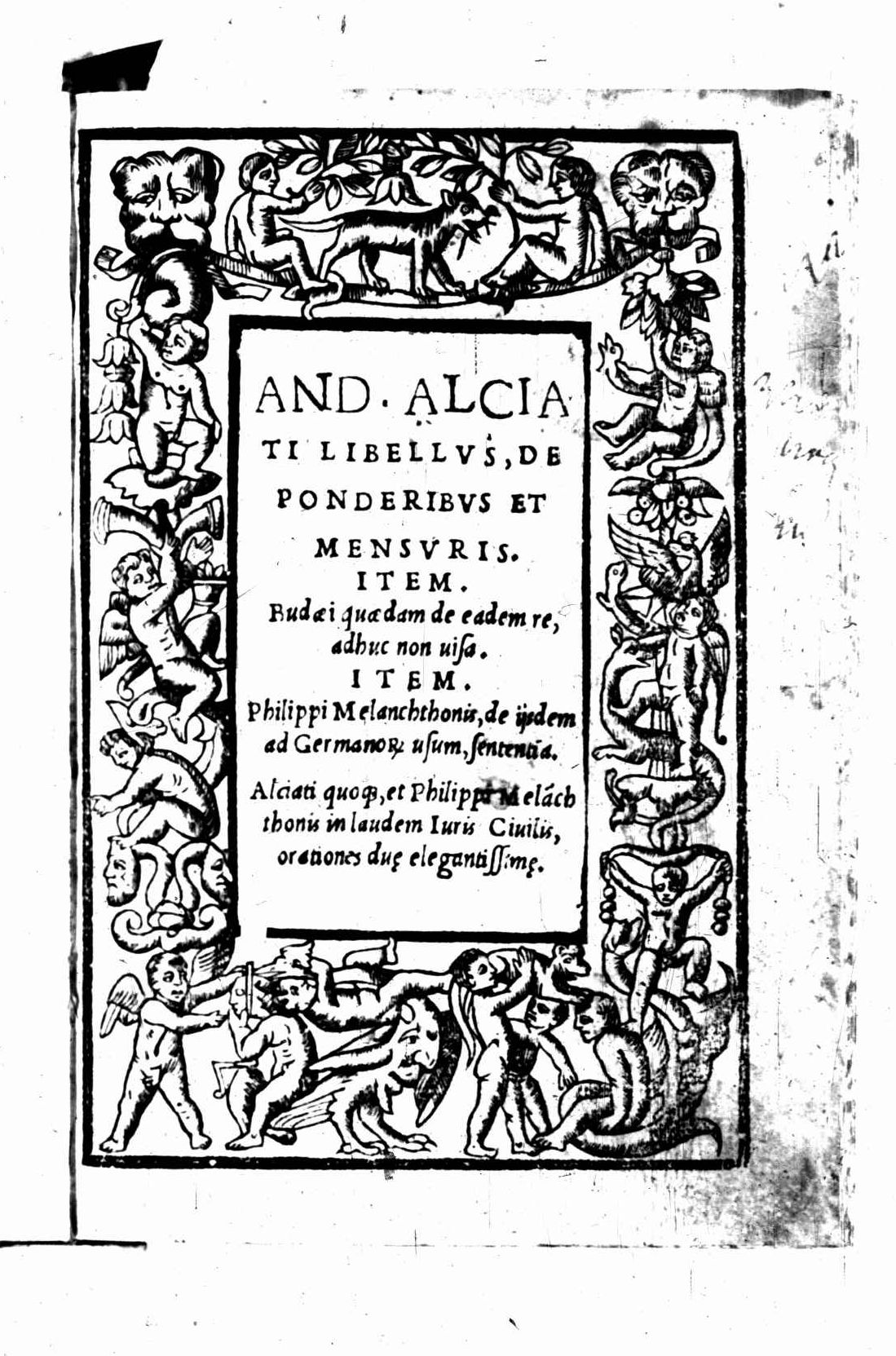
De ponderibus et mensuris, 1532

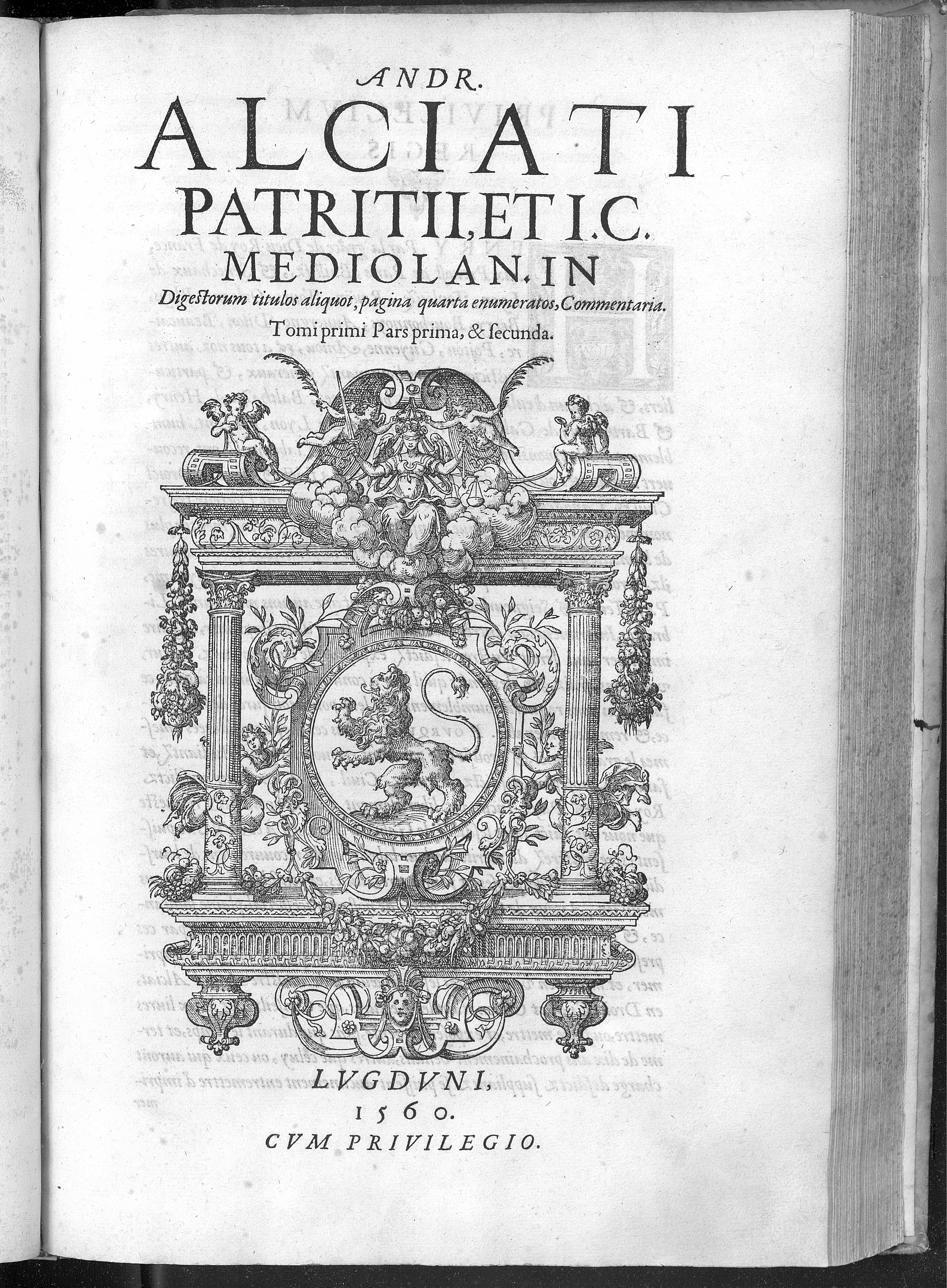
In Digestorum titulos aliquot commentaria, 1560

== Bibliography ==
- Picinelli, Filippo (1670). Ateneo dei letterati milanesi. Milan: Vigone. pp. 25–8.
- Andrea Alciato, Il libro degli emblemi secondo le edizioni del 1531 e del 1534, with Introduction, Italian translation and commentary by Mino Gabriele (Milan: Adelphi, 2009; second revised edition 2015) ISBN 978-88-459-2967-0
- William S. Heckscher, The Princeton Alciati Companion. A Glossary of Neo-Latin words and phrases used by Andrea Alciati and the emblem book writers of his time, including a bibliography of secondary sources relevant to the study of Alciati's emblems (New York: Garland, 1989) ISBN 0-8240-3715-4

== Quotation ==
Plenitudo potestatis nihil aliud est quam violentia.
