= Handwritten Annals of the City of Toulouse =

Book series

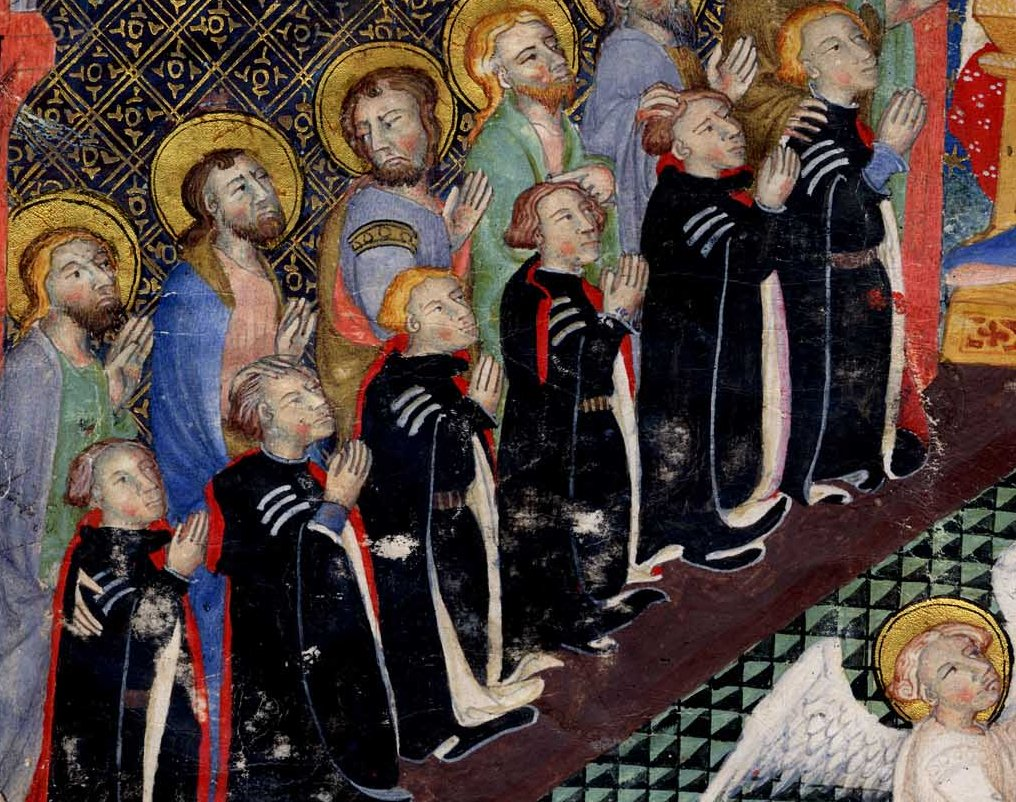
Detail of the illustration of the year 1412–1413. Behind each kneeling capitoul, a saint (either an apostle or their patron saint) is standing.

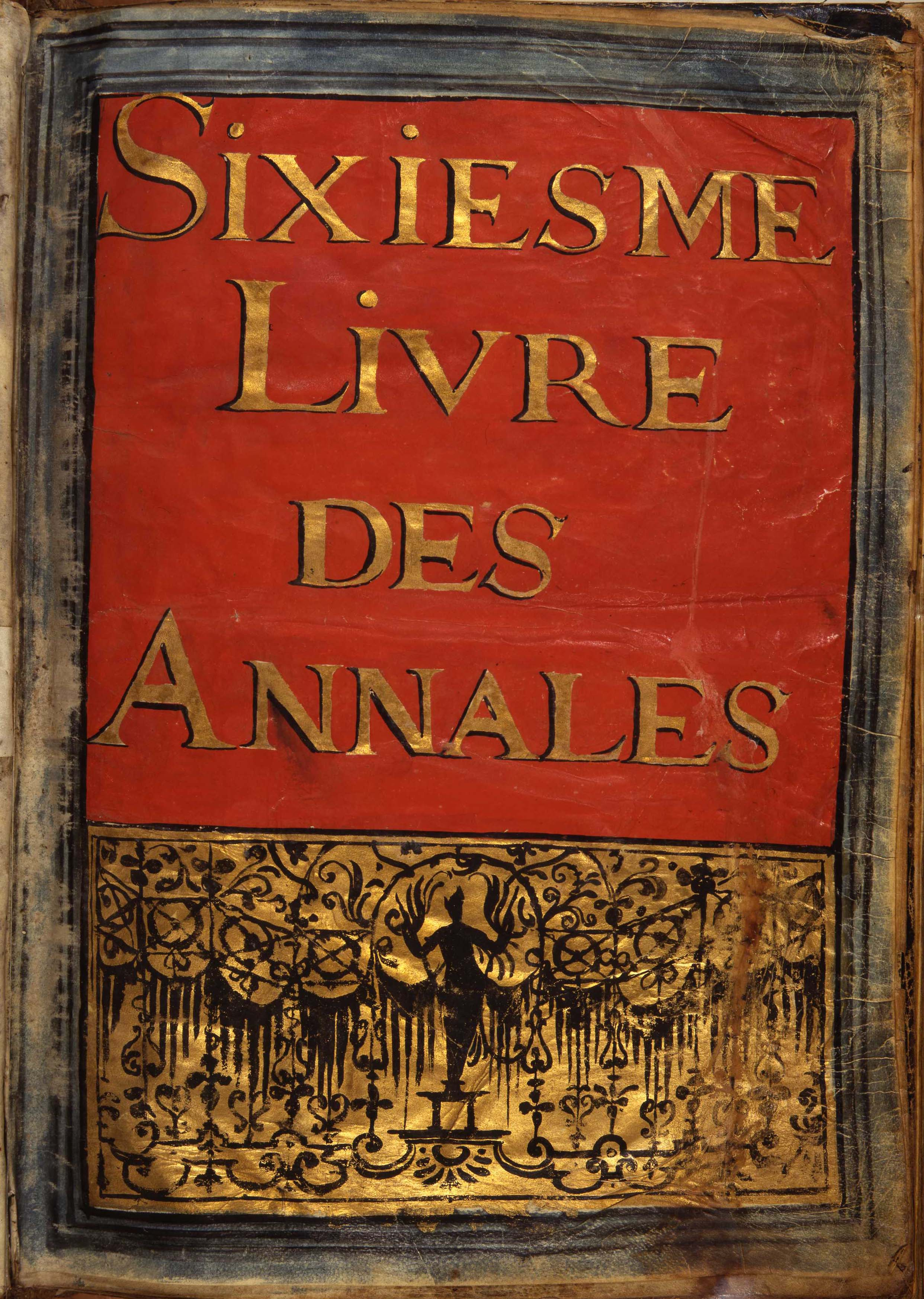
Frontispiece of Book VI of the Annals (1618–1633).

The Handwritten Annals of the City of Toulouse, also known as the Annals of the Capitouls, were held from 1295 to 1787. They consist of a collection of books on which were recorded each year the administrative acts as well as the rights and privileges of the capitouls, the municipal consuls of Toulouse.

These Annals are particularly renowned for the illuminations that decorate them, an original and unique example in Europe of miniature portraits of municipal consuls in the exercise of their office. Although a revolutionary autodafé destroyed most of them on August 10, 1793, the surviving sample nonetheless constitutes an exceptional testimony to Toulouse's past. (Note: Out of 452 chronicles, 183 have completely disappeared. But only 75 portrait plates escaped destruction, 69 of which are preserved in Toulouse.)

== The work of the capitouls ==
The capitouls appear in 1147 as advisers to the count Alphonse Jourdain. Coming from the urban bourgeoisie, they are at first essentially confined to the role of judges of commercial cases. In 1189, taking advantage of a weakening of the count's power and in favour of a popular uprising, they snatch new prerogatives and a certain autonomy from the count Raimond V. They now also take charge of the police, public works, hospital maintenance and the city's finances, and see in the judicial field their powers extended.

But in 1271 the line of the Counts of Toulouse died out and the city was attached to the royal domain. From then on, the royal administration will endeavor to reverse the conquered municipal freedoms, with ever-increasing pressure. To defend their institution the capitouls seek to increase their prestige as well as to keep the memory of their administrative acts, their privileges and their rights.

Thus, in 1295, 24 years after Toulouse was attached to the Royal Crown, a large-format book divided into six parts was created:

- the first part to record the names of the twelve consuls (their number will vary several times and will not be fixed at eight until 1438), as well as various information relating to the notables of the municipal administration and to the districts of the city.
- the second part to copy the customs of Toulouse.
- the third part to copy the statutes, privileges and liberalities of the city.
- the fourth part to transcribe the letters of grace from kings granted to consuls or to the city.
- the fifth part to copy the decrees of the king's court, the ordinances of the royal officers, and all the documents which can be used for the good government of the city and the maintenance of its privileges.
- the sixth part to record the follow-up of notaries and their registers or minutes.

Only the first part must be completed each year, and several pages are left blank for this purpose. It is this part that is more particularly the object of aesthetic care, which is first manifested by the attention paid to the initial letter decorated with portraits of capitouls, although these are then secondary.

At the end of 14th century all the blank pages of this first book, called the "White Book", are filled in. It is then dismembered as follows: parts two to six are in a volume which retains the name "White Book", the first part is bound separately, forming a "Vermilion Book" or "Red Book". This last book will count twelve volumes in 1787, date of the last annal written.

For almost a century, the text of the chronicles was limited to being a kind of municipal directory. In 1383, however, a new element was recounted: the revolt of the Toulouse bourgeoisie, led by the capitouls, against the repression carried out against the Tuchin Revolt by the Duke of Berry, governor of Languedoc. Important events were thus added more and more frequently, and at the end of 15th century chronicles on the "true history of Toulouse" were even added to the Annals. More or less fanciful, they evoke, for example, the foundation of the city by the mythical King Tholus, grandson of Japhet, or even place Toulouse on an equal footing with Rome... Thus the Annals became, particularly during the Renaissance, a tool to promote the city and the actions of the capitouls. Although the historical value of the texts is relative, they nevertheless provide information on the concern of the municipal body to enhance its image and legitimacy in order to better defend itself against attempts by the royal administration or the Parlement of Toulouse to restrict its prerogatives. These picturesque additions disappear in the 17th century, the chronicles then being reduced to a report on the action carried out during the past year.

== Portraits of the capitouls ==
It is the portraits of capitouls illustrating the texts that make the Annals of Toulouse so original and famous. Only one similar set is known: the wooden tablet covers of the archives of the treasury of Siena. However, this collection only includes the coats of arms of Sienese municipal magistrates, enriched with a political or religious scene, and not their portraits. The Annals of Toulouse therefore constitute a truly unique collection of which 75 plates from the years 1352 to 1778 have come down to present day.

From the end of the 13th century to the beginning of the 14th century, portraits take place in the cramped space of the initial letter and are little more than decorative silhouettes with no concern for resemblance. But then, the scenes unfold over an increasingly large space: in 1351 the illumination takes the entire width of the page but occupies a still reduced height, in 1369 an architectural decoration comes to accompany the representation of the capitouls. In 1399 an unfortunately disappeared plate depicts the capitouls as actors in a scene representing the Passion of Christ, in 1413 a plate preserved shows them courting the Virgin. The drawing gains in finesse, going from an illumination decoration to the realization of real small paintings.

In the 15th century political or religious scenes are systematically used as a frame for miniature portraits. The quality is improving, although it varies according to the talent of the illuminators, whose remuneration for this work has always been rather low.

During the French Renaissance (16th century), the paintings generally occupy a whole page, the portraits become more and more realistic and the background more polished, although it evokes non-Toulousian landscapes. The 17th century was marked by scenes covering a double page and, from 1612 to 1644, by the talent of the painter Jean Chalette who, through the drapes, looks, attitudes or hand positions, gives an extraordinary realism to these compositions which are now more paintings than miniatures. Subsequent painters adopted a more conventional style and, except in 1659 for the entry of Louis XIV and in 1701 for that of the Dukes of Burgundy and Berry, the staging was abandoned, the background being generally satisfied with a decor of drapes.

For almost five centuries, the making of these portraits fell within the framework of "image rights", (Note: Like the nobles, the capitouls had the right to have their portraits executed. The miniatures in the Annals are not the only manifestation of this image right; capitouls also had larger portraits made, individually and in groups.) a privilege associated with the function of capitoul. Also the latter were particularly attached to it, to the point that in 1689 the intendant of Languedoc, Lamoignon de Basville, reproached them for being more concerned with the making of their portraits than with the prompt execution of the king's orders.

Examples of portraits from the Handwritten Annals

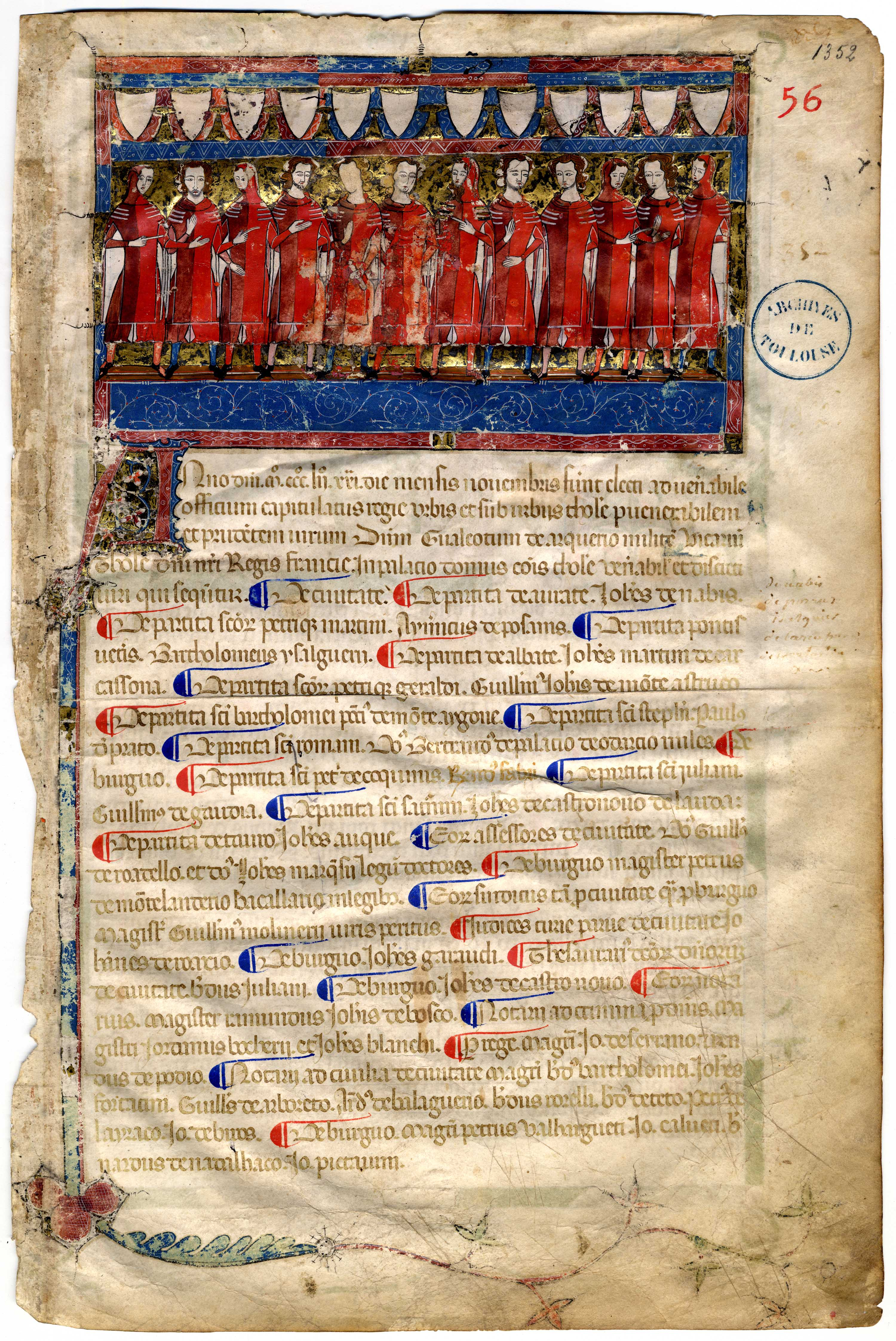
Portraits of capitouls from the year 1352–1353. The oldest preserved sheet.

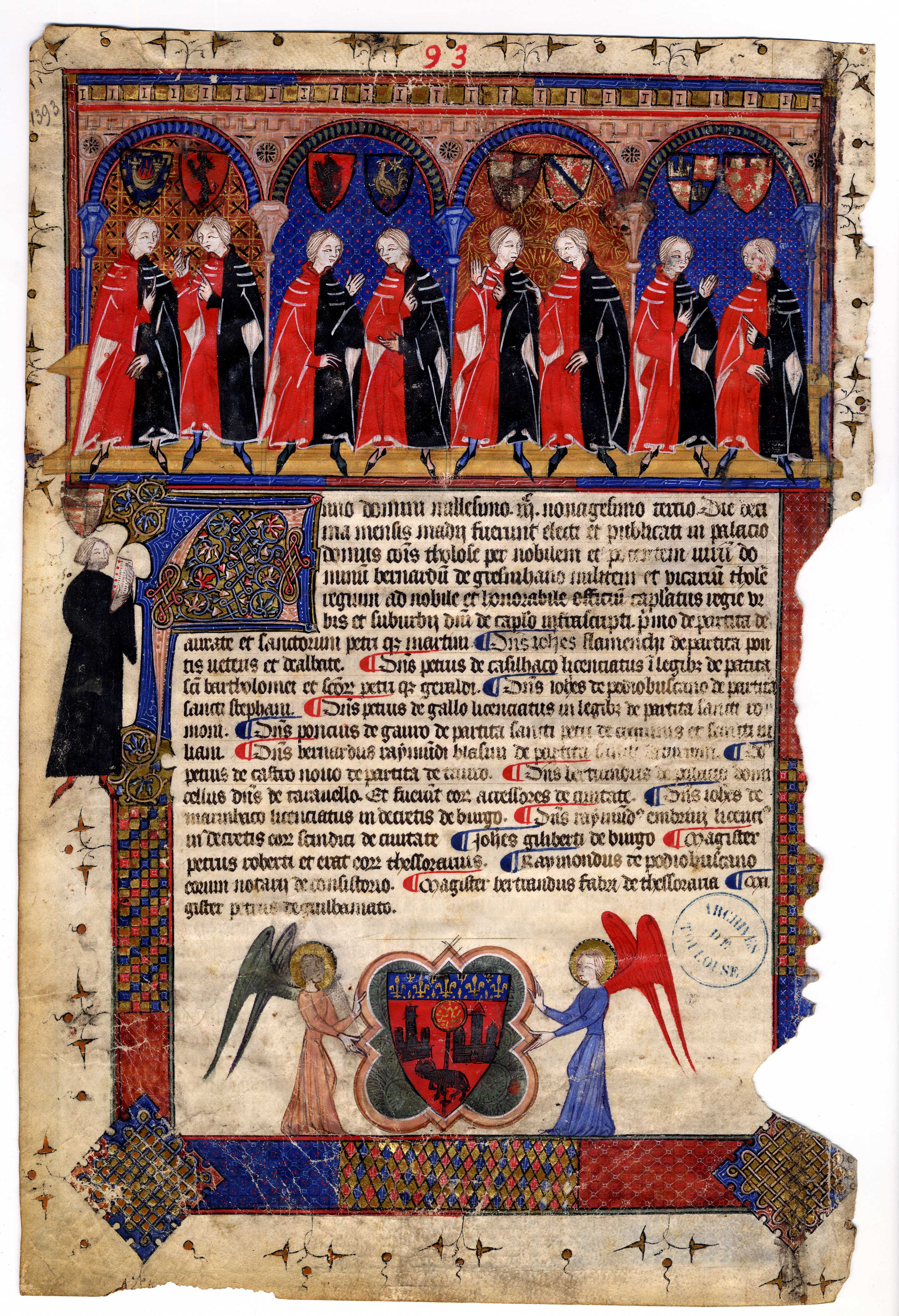
Portraits of capitouls from the year 1393–1394. The arms of Toulouse are represented by two angels shrouded in gold.

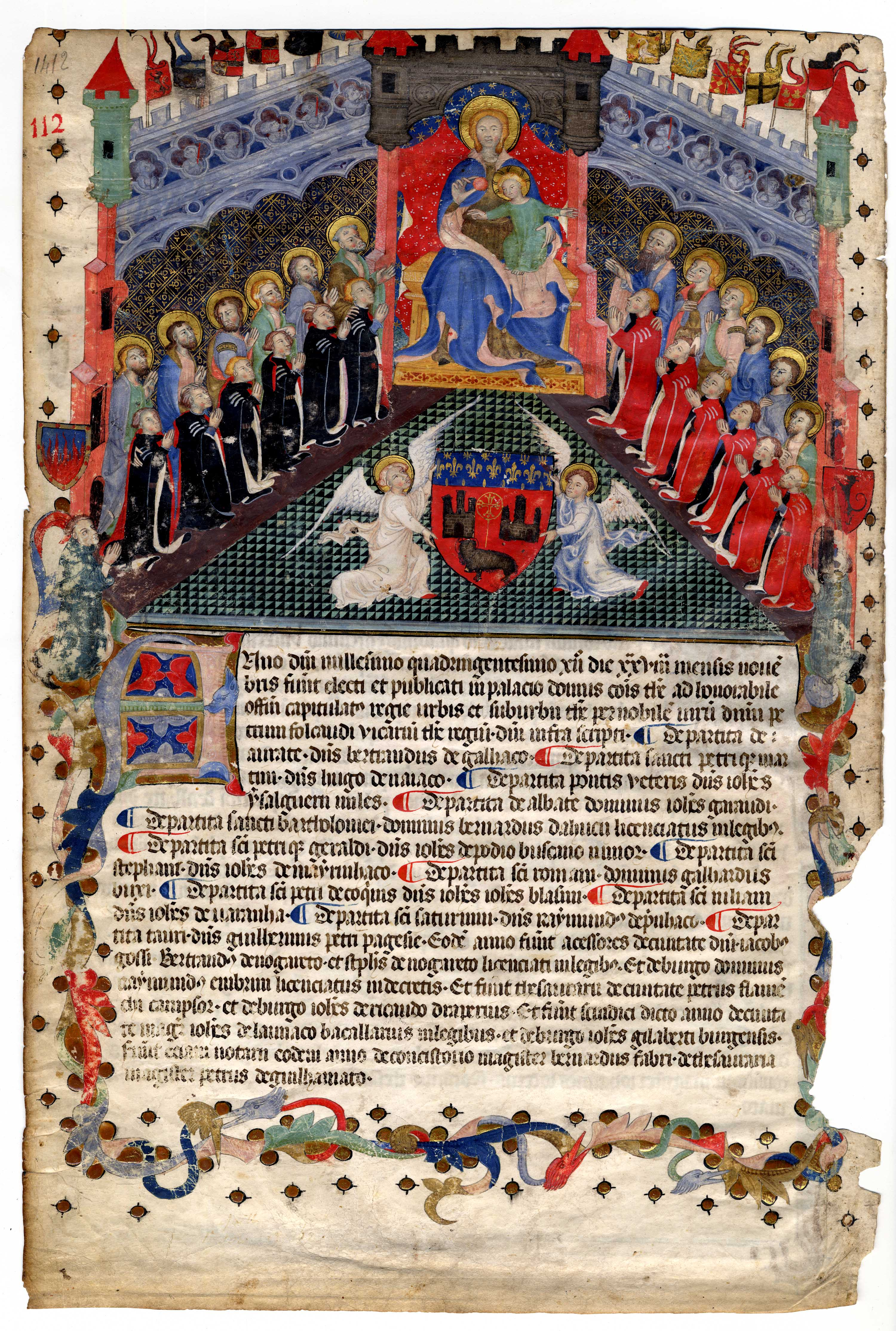
Portraits of the capitouls of the year 1412-1413 and the court of the Virgin Mary or the Virgin with apple.

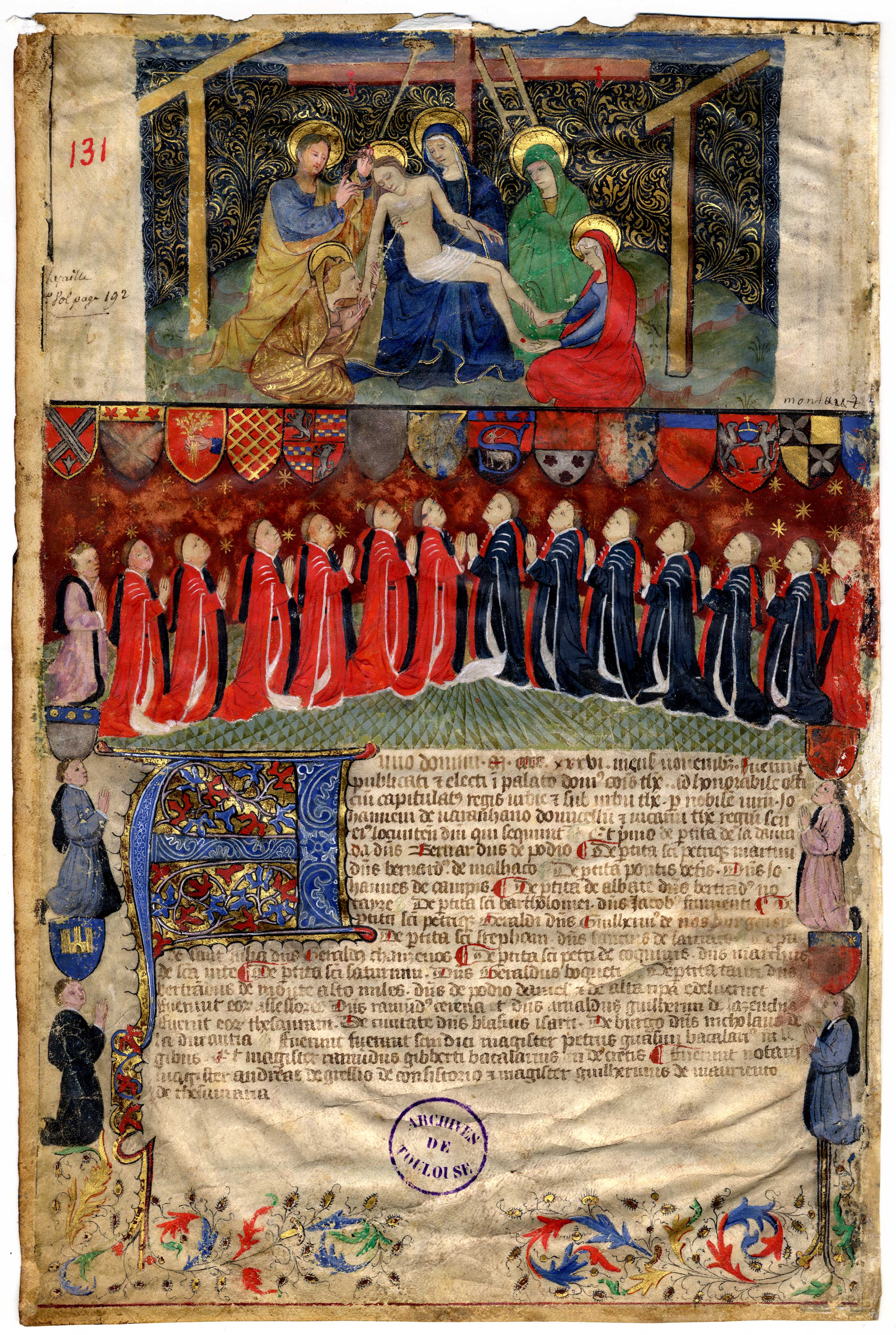
Portraits of capitouls of the year 1436-1437 and the descent from the cross.

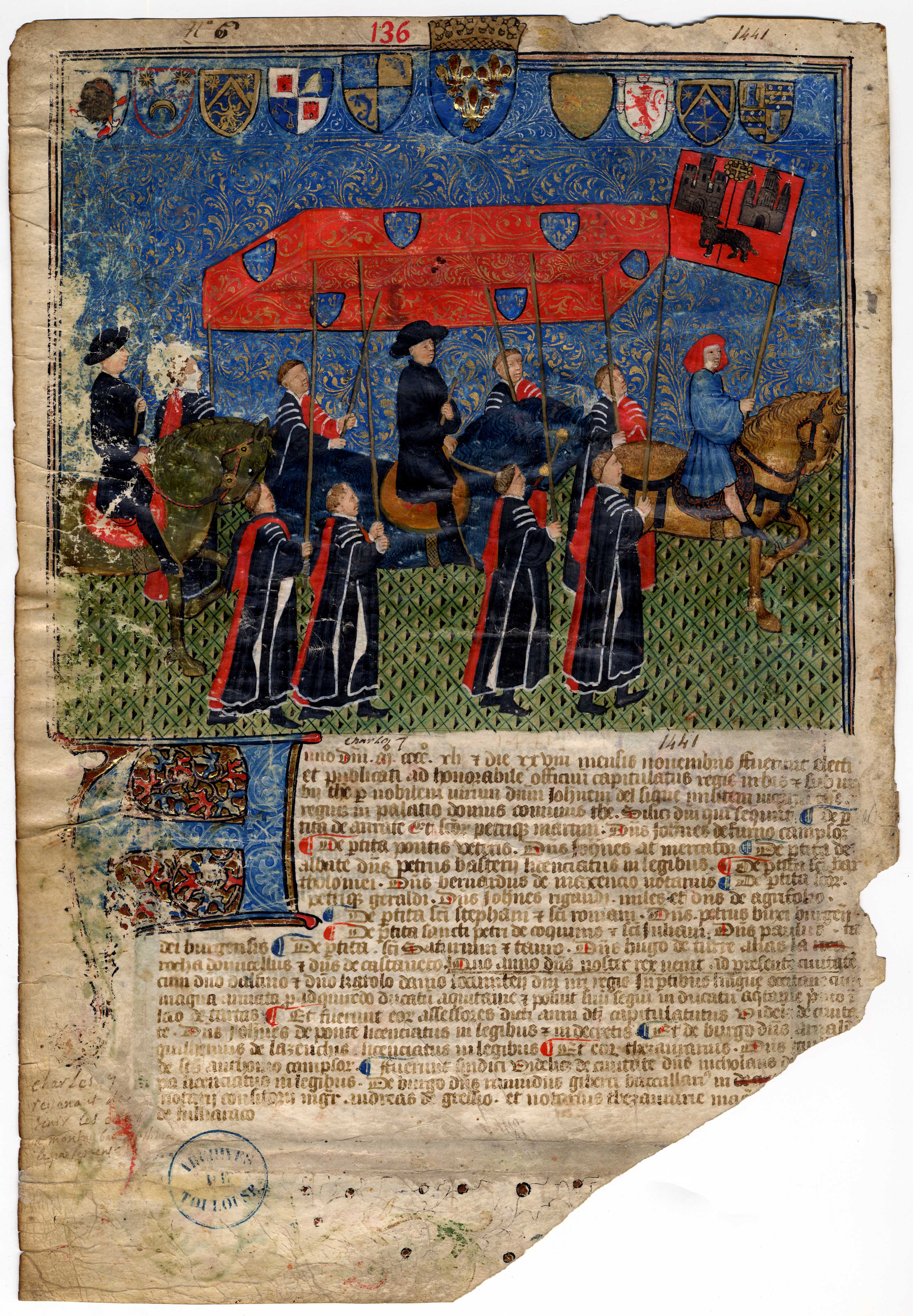
The capitouls of the year 1441-1442 and the entry of King Charles VII into Toulouse.

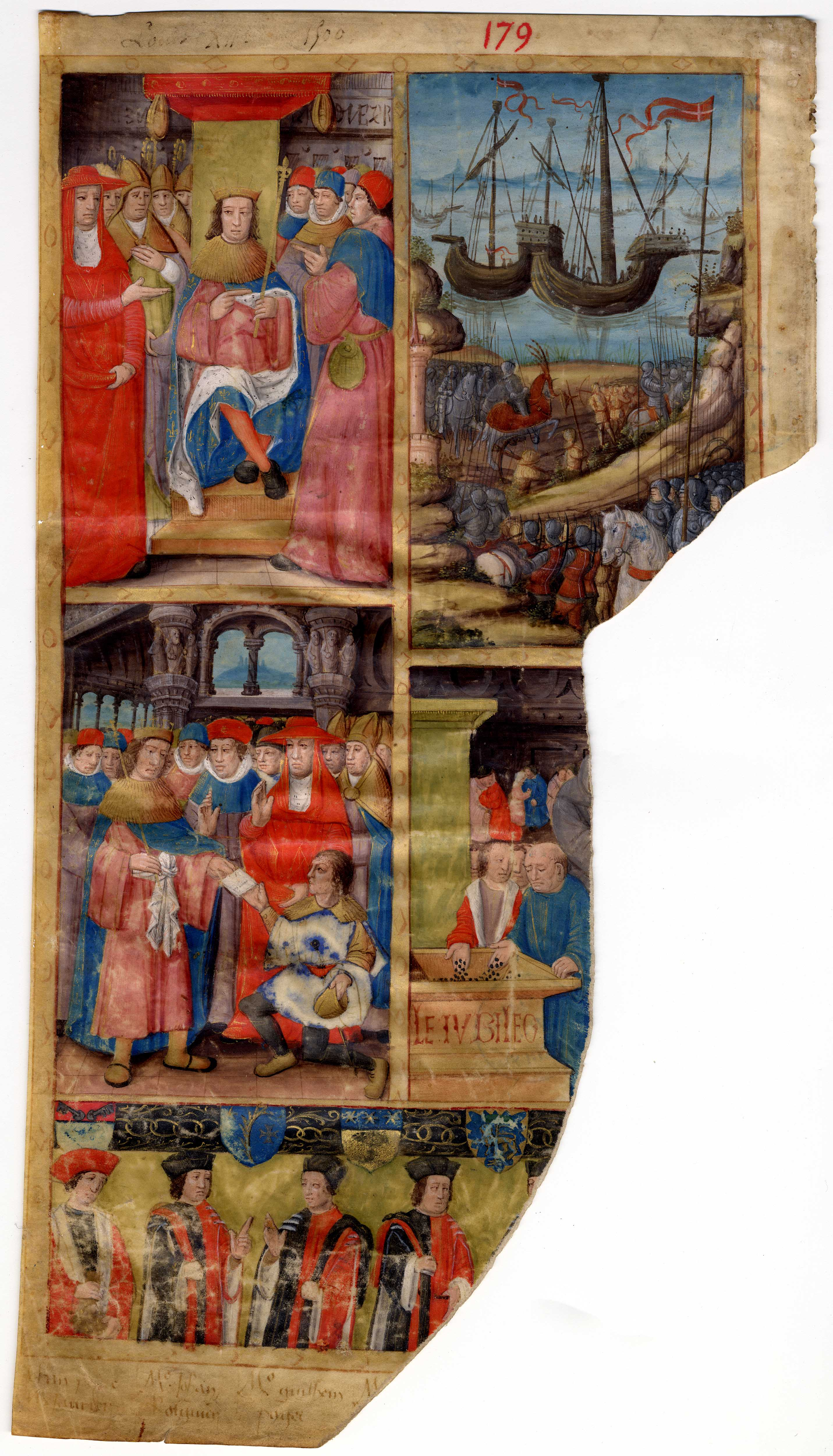
The capitouls of the year 1500-1501 and historical scenes of the year, by Liénard de Lachieze.

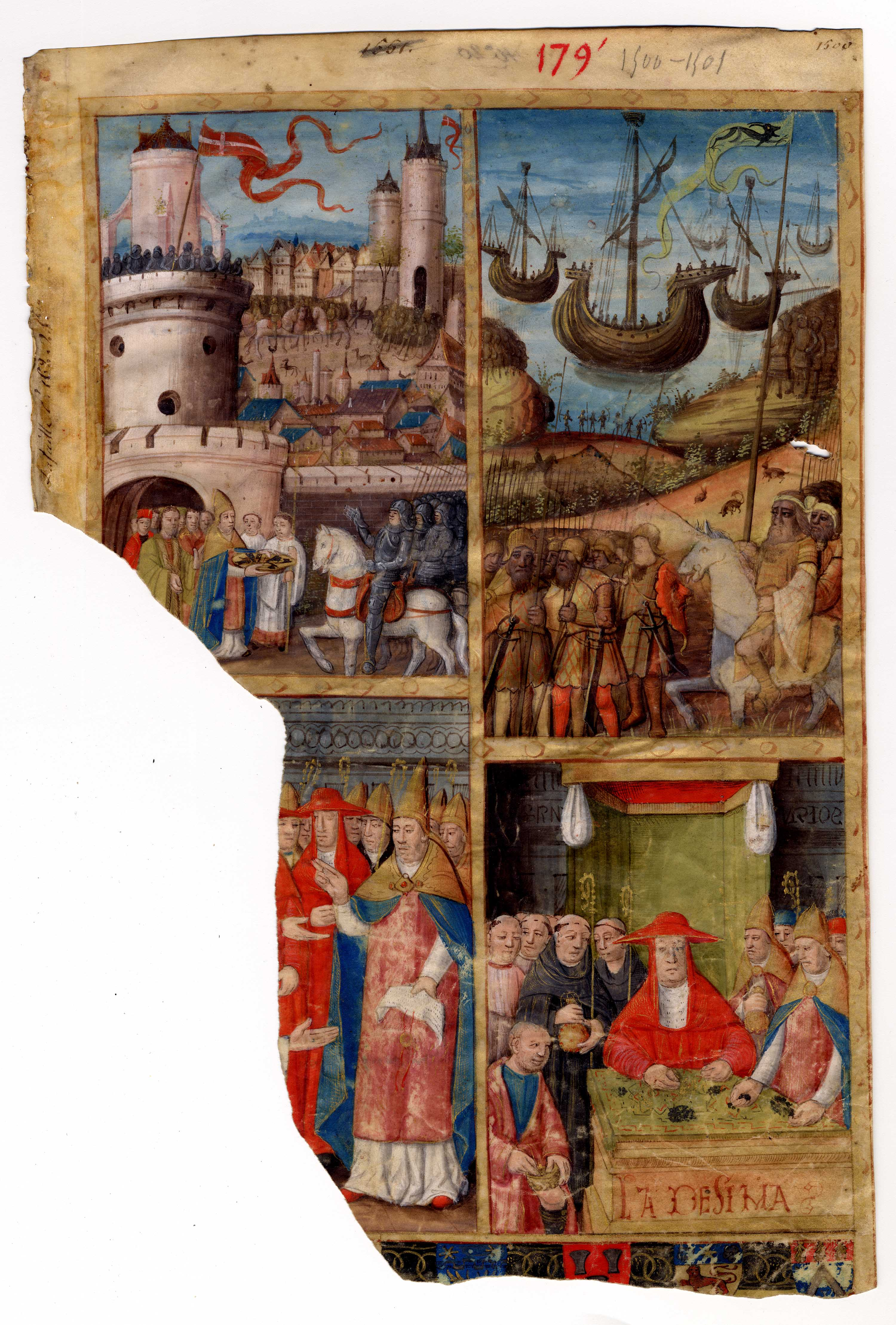
Historical scenes from the year 1500-1501 (continued), by Liénard de Lachieze.

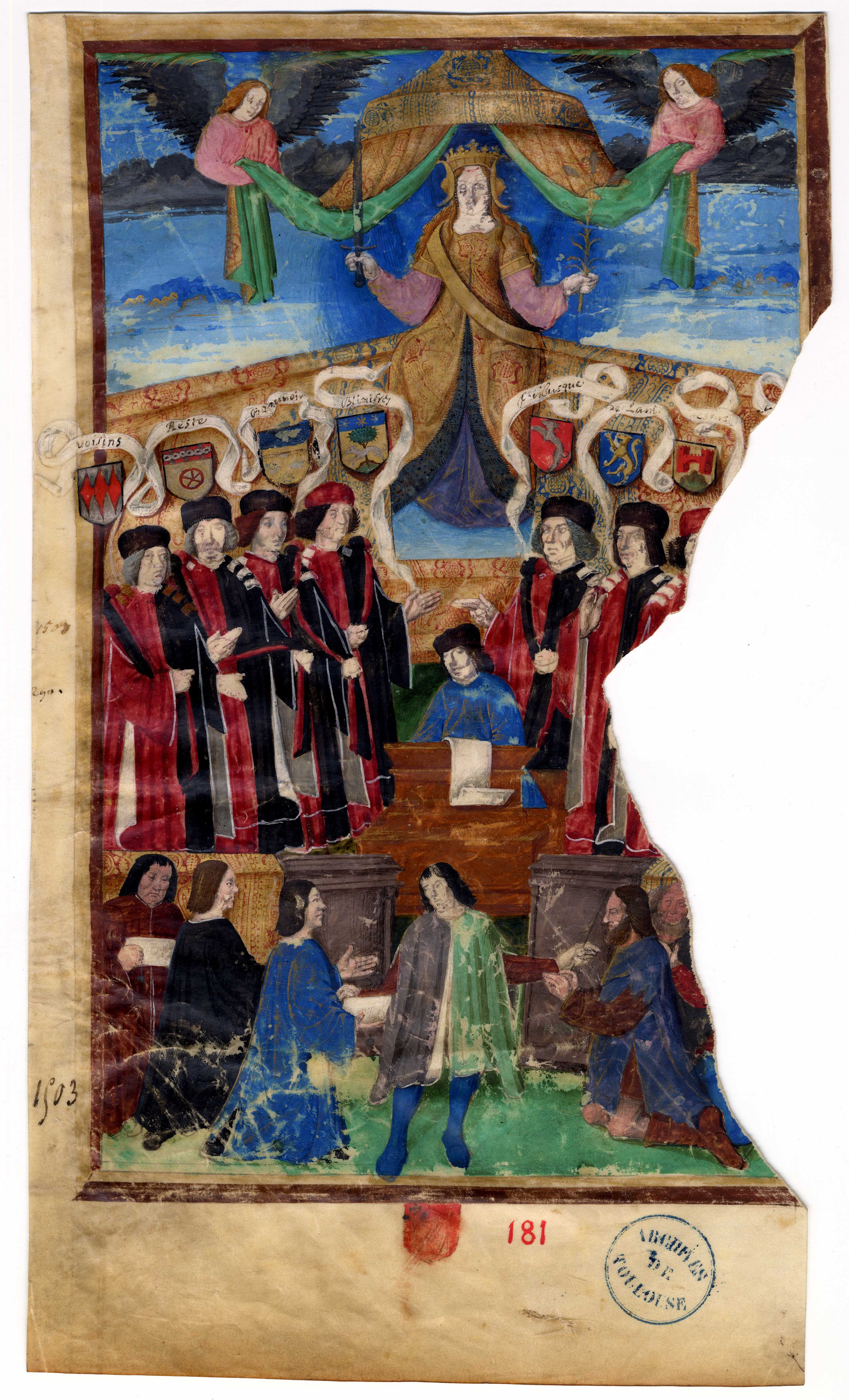
The capitouls of the year 1503-1504 are staged during a court session.

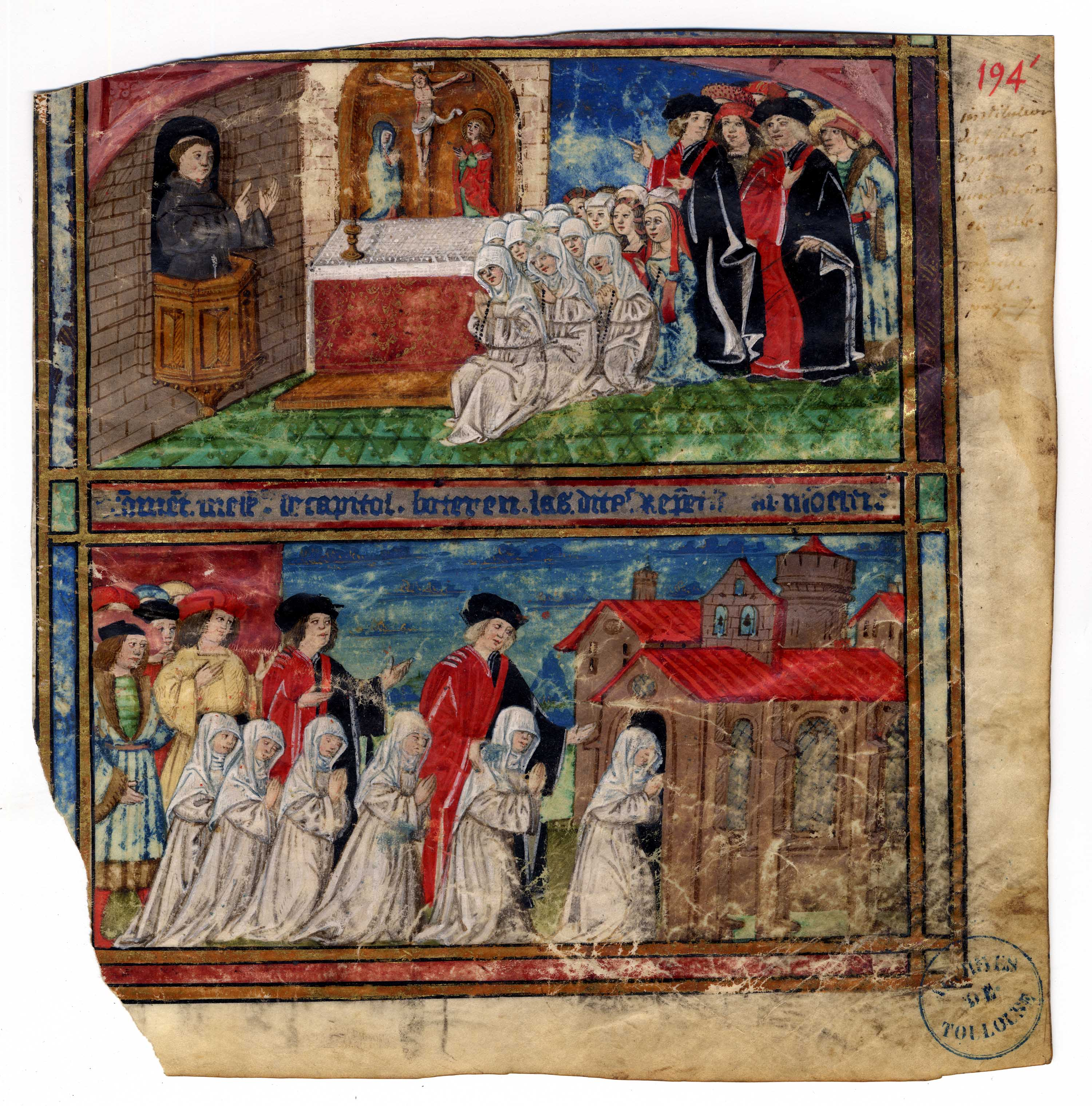
The capitouls of the year 1516-1517 and the institution of the repentations of Sainte-Madeleine, by Mathieu Cochin.

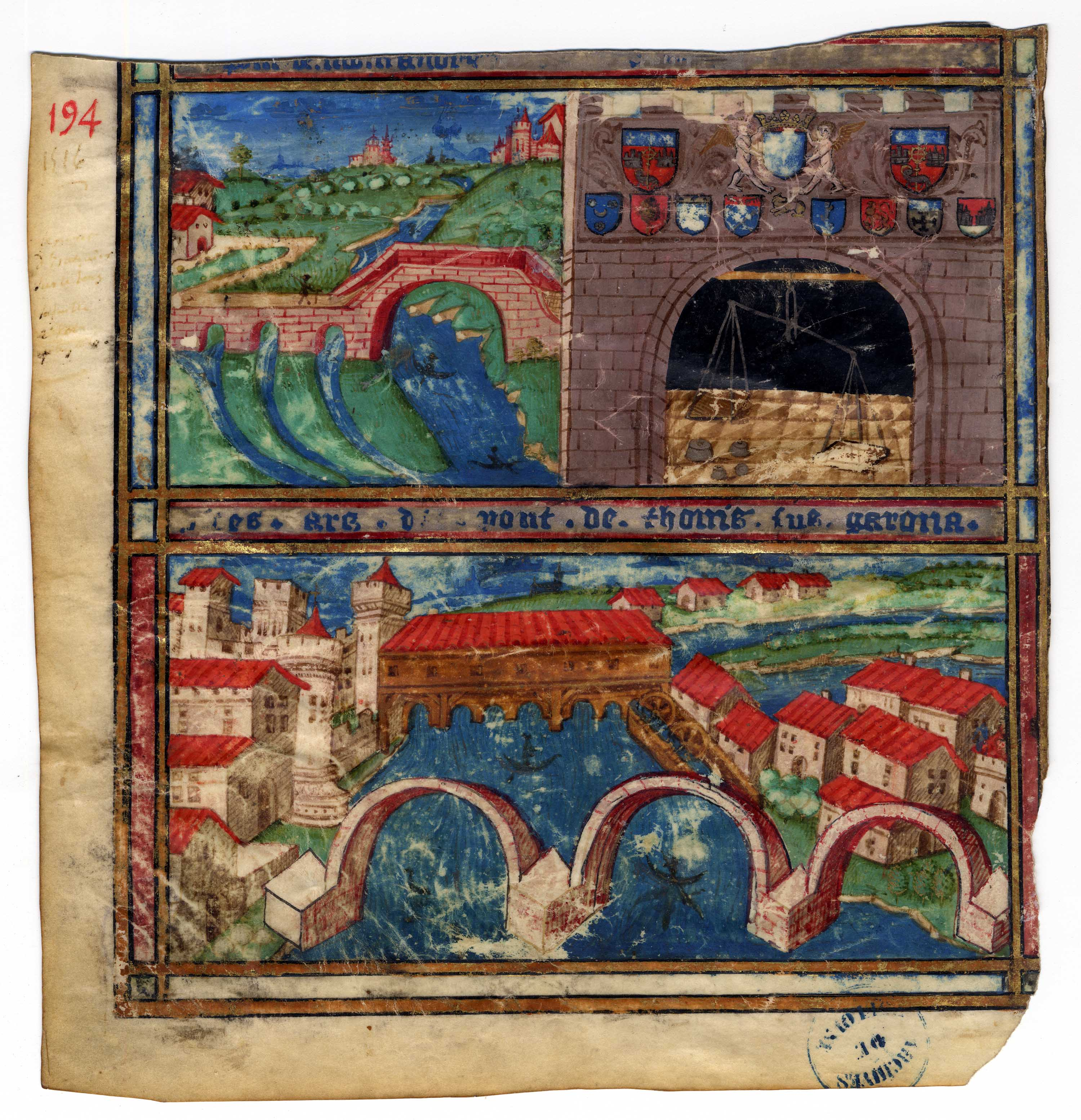
The capitouls of the year 1516-1517 and the bridges of Montaudran, Tounis (under construction), and the weighing house, by Mathieu Cochin.

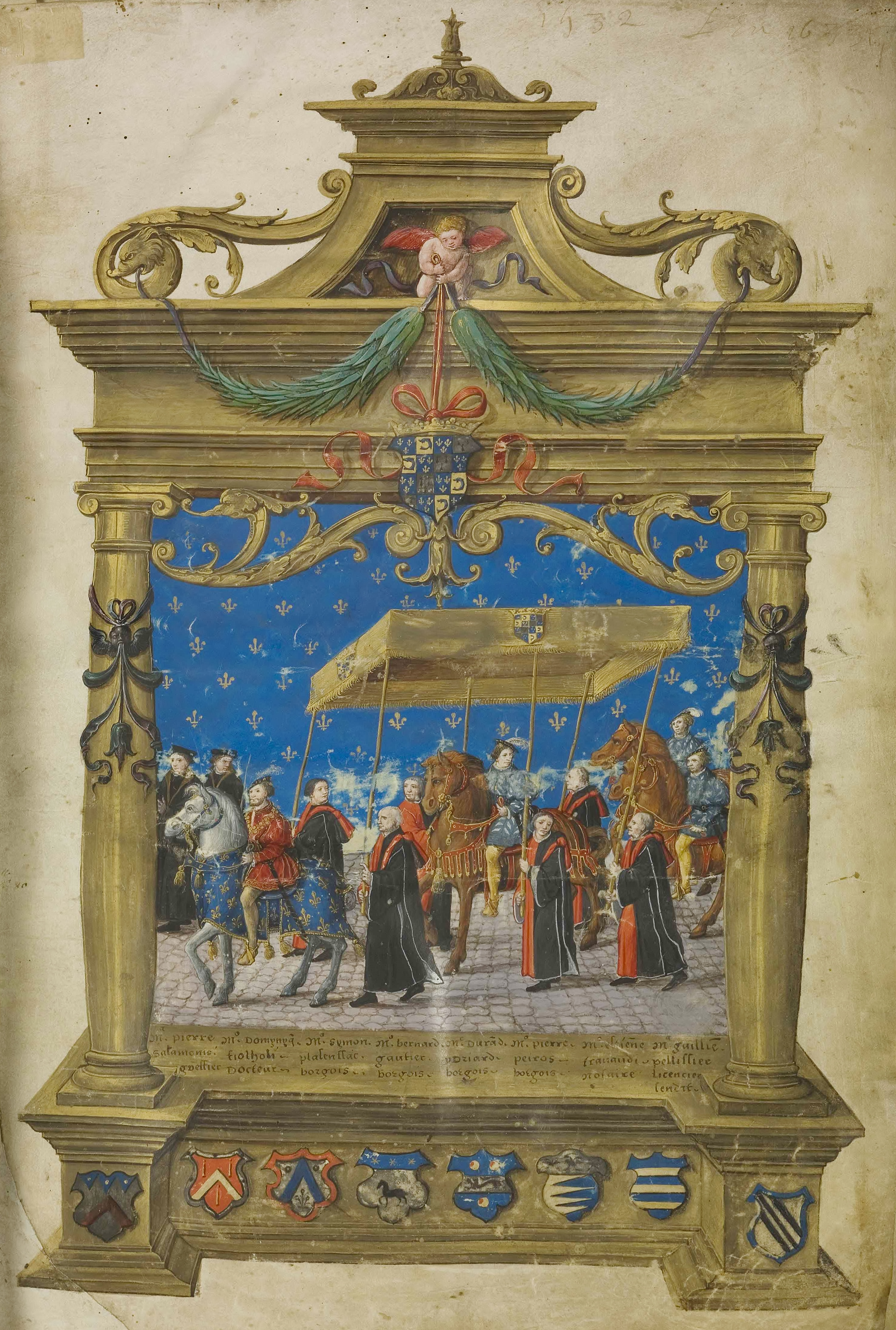
The capitouls of the year 1532-1533 and the entry of the dauphin, son of king Francis I, by Charles Pingault.

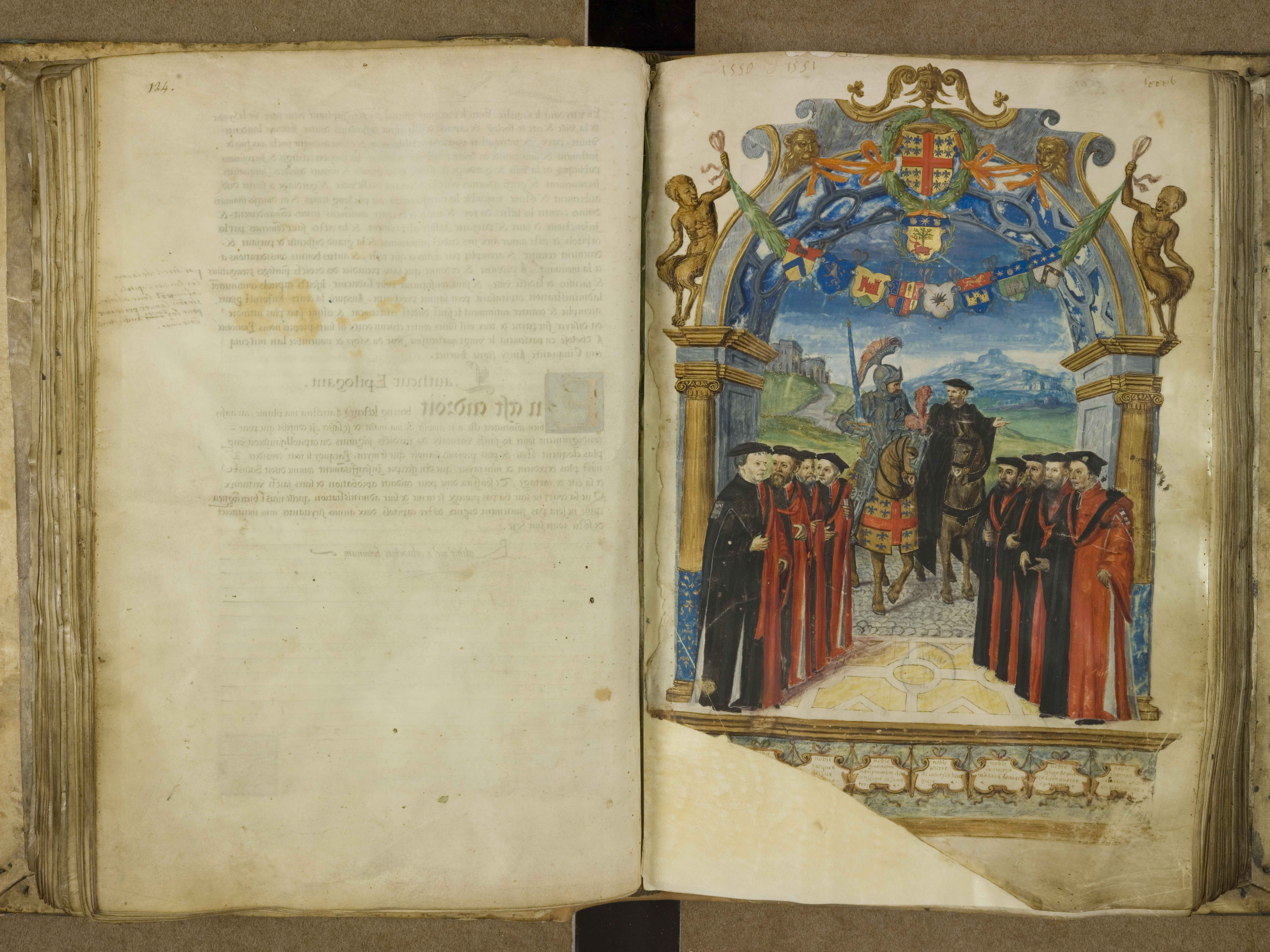
The capitouls of the year 1550-1551 and the entry of the constable Anne de Montmorency, by Jean Faguelin.

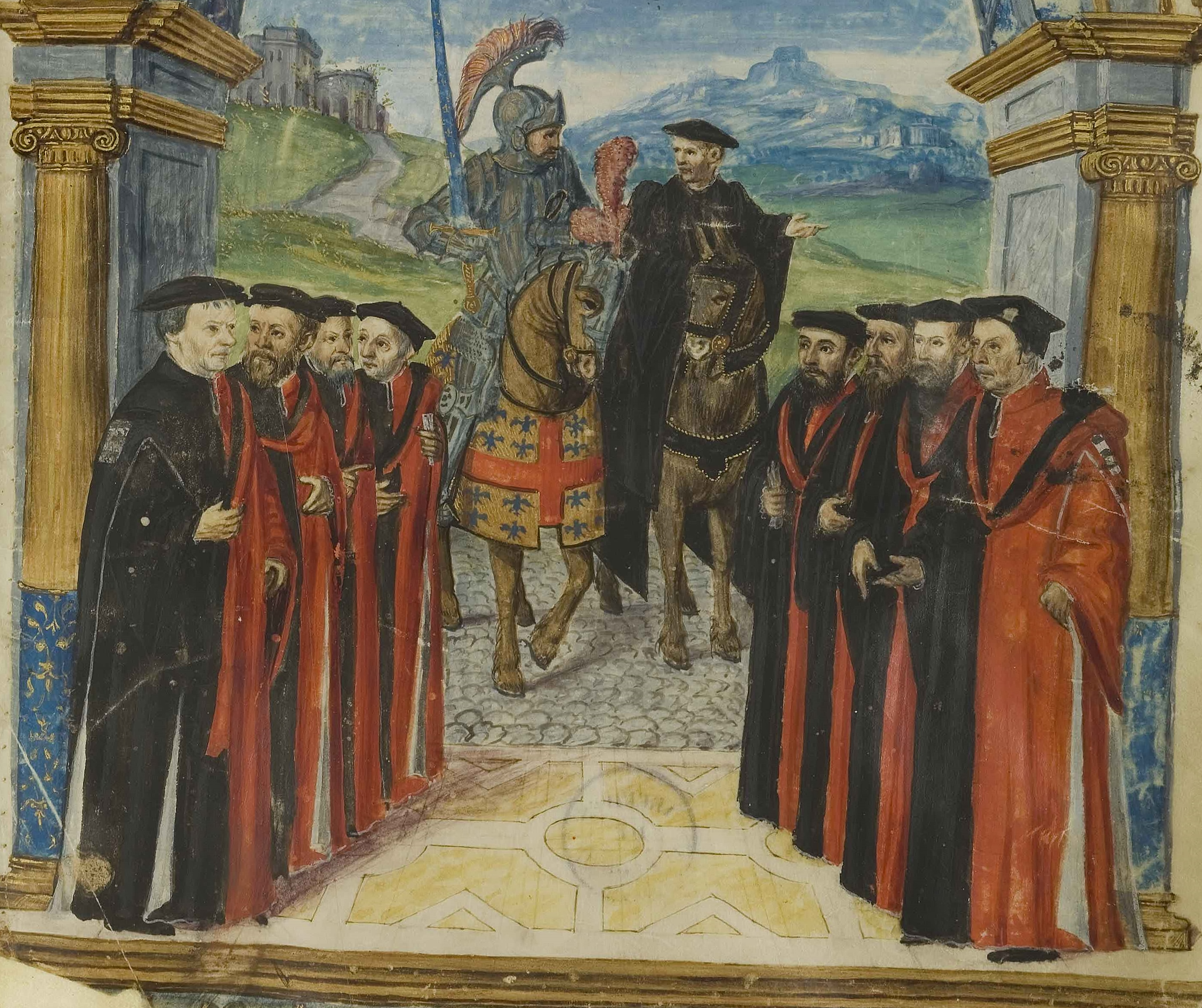
Detail of the previous one, by Jean Faguelin.

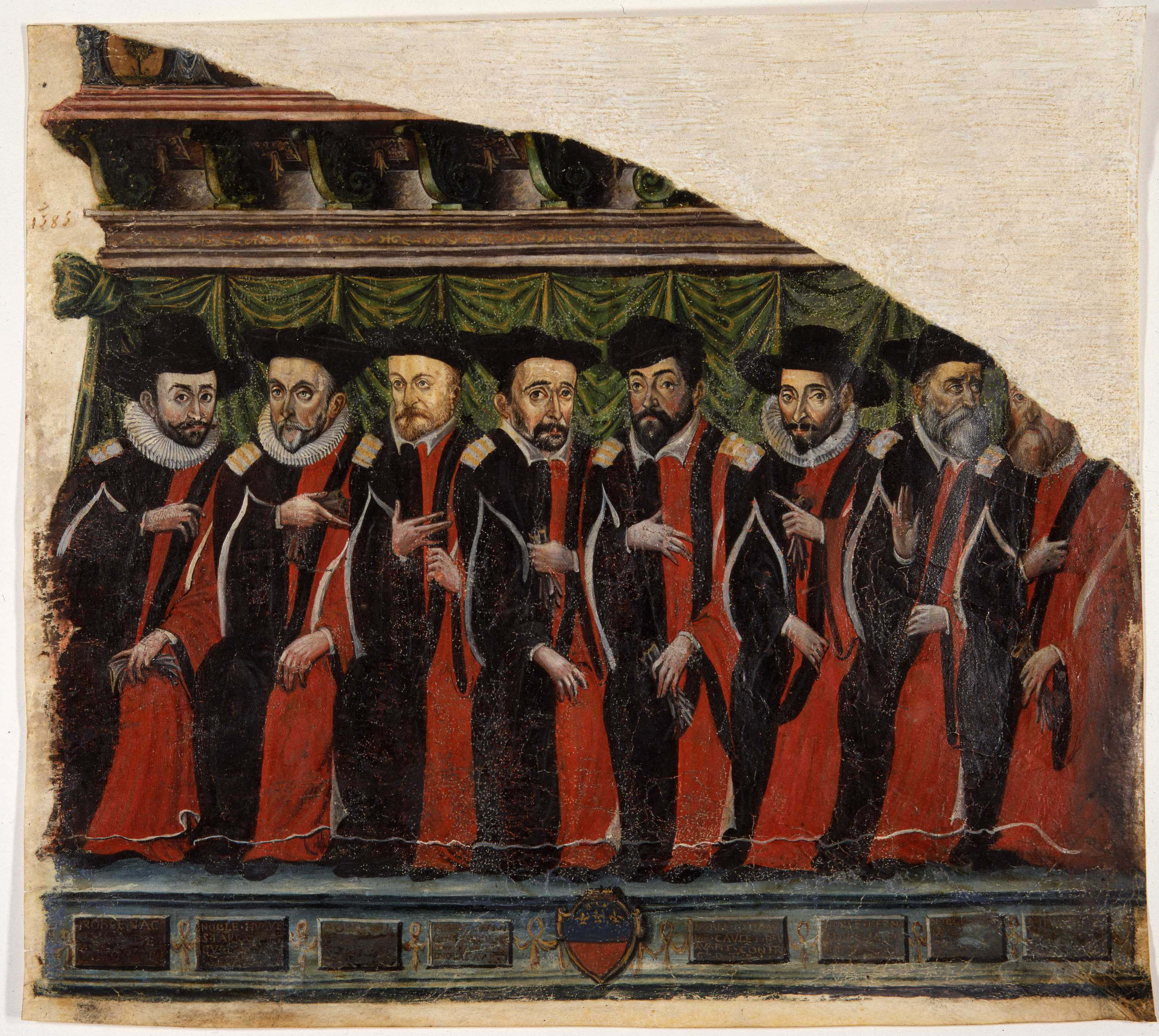
The capitouls of the year 1584–1585, by Thierry Le Roy.

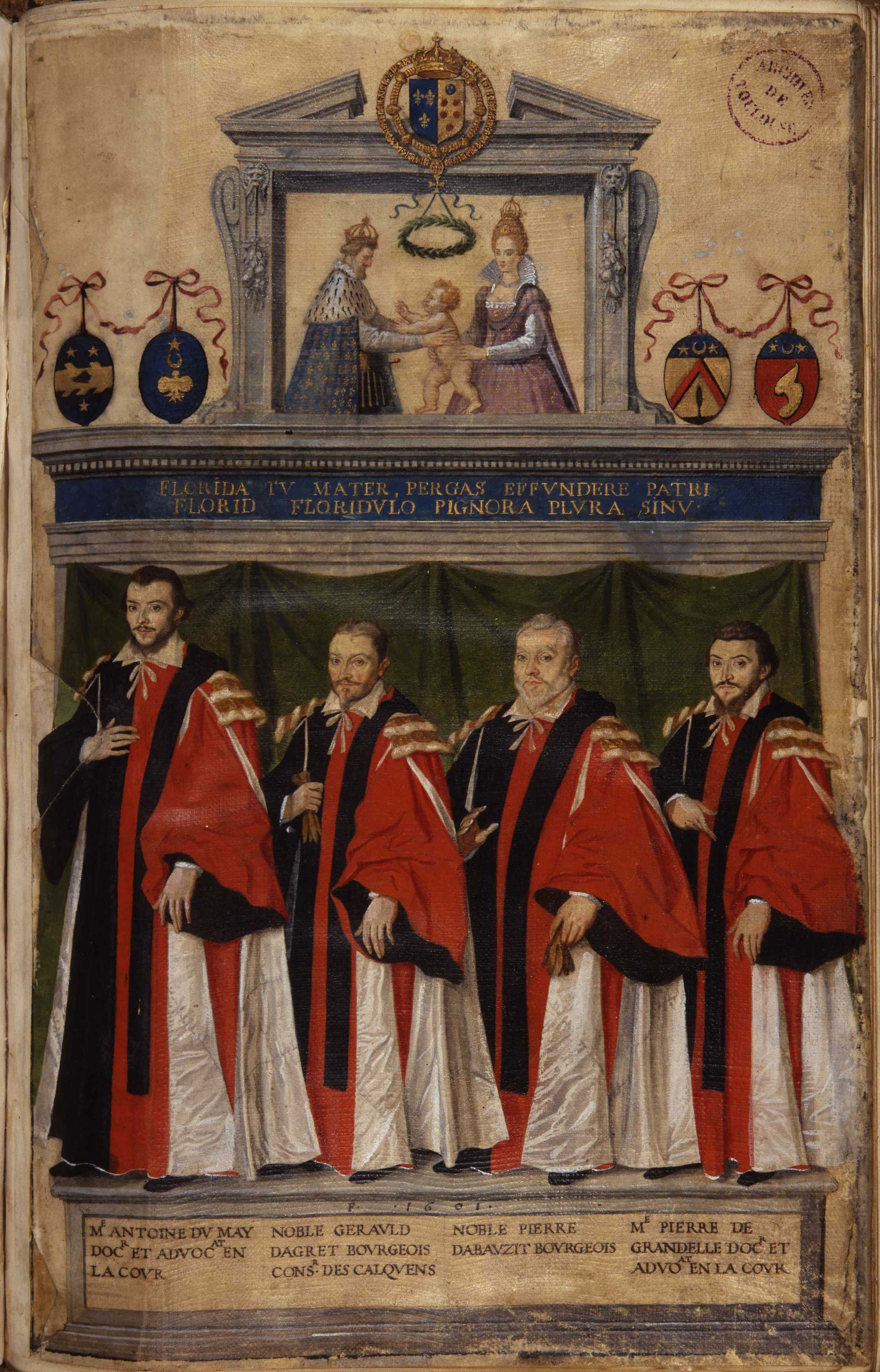
The capitouls of the year 1600-1601 and the marriage of King Henry IV and Marie de' Medici, by Charles Galleri.

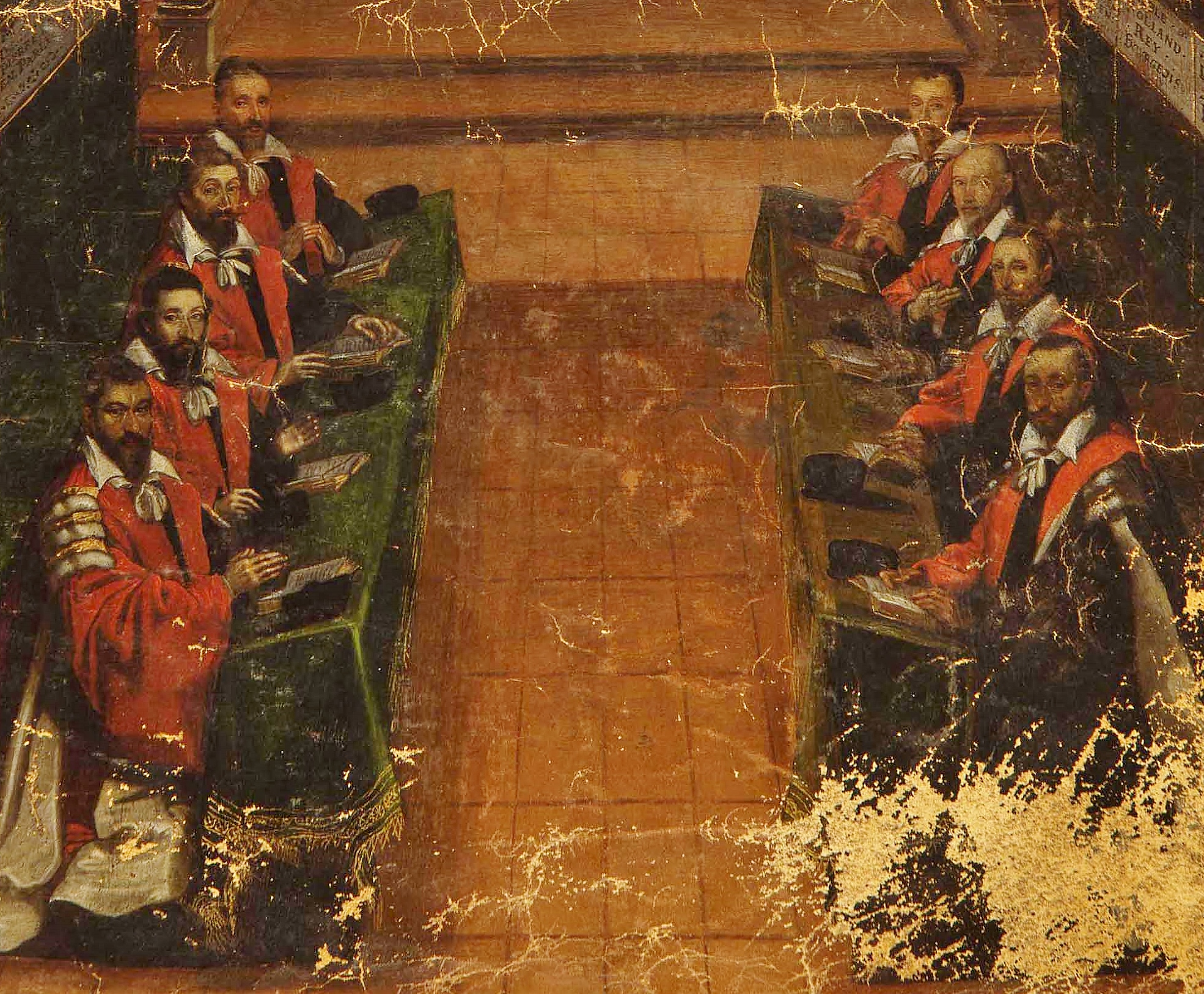
The capitouls of the year 1617–1618 in the chapel of the town house (detail), by Jean Chalette.

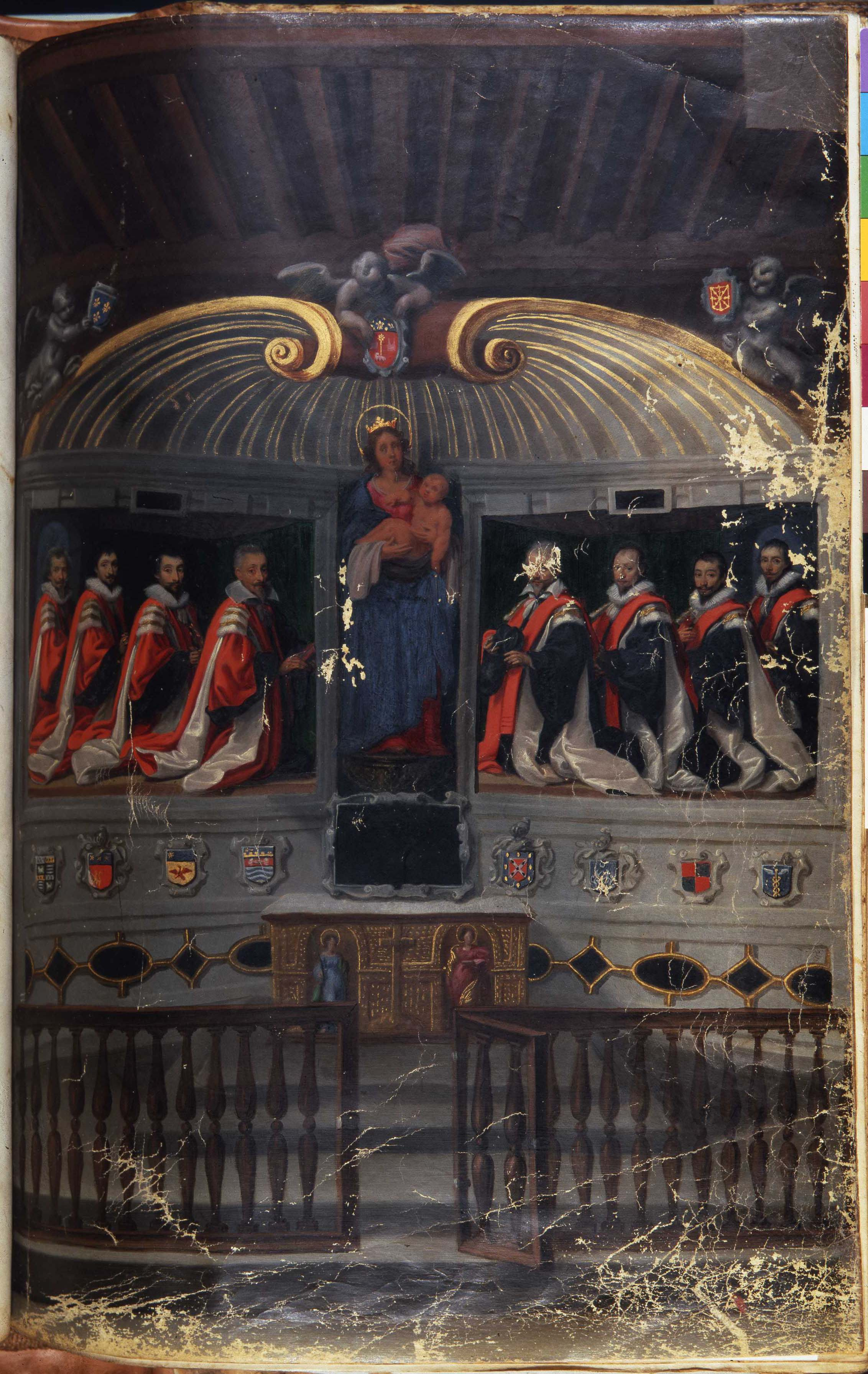
1623-1624, the Virgin and the oratory of the town house, by Jean Chalette.

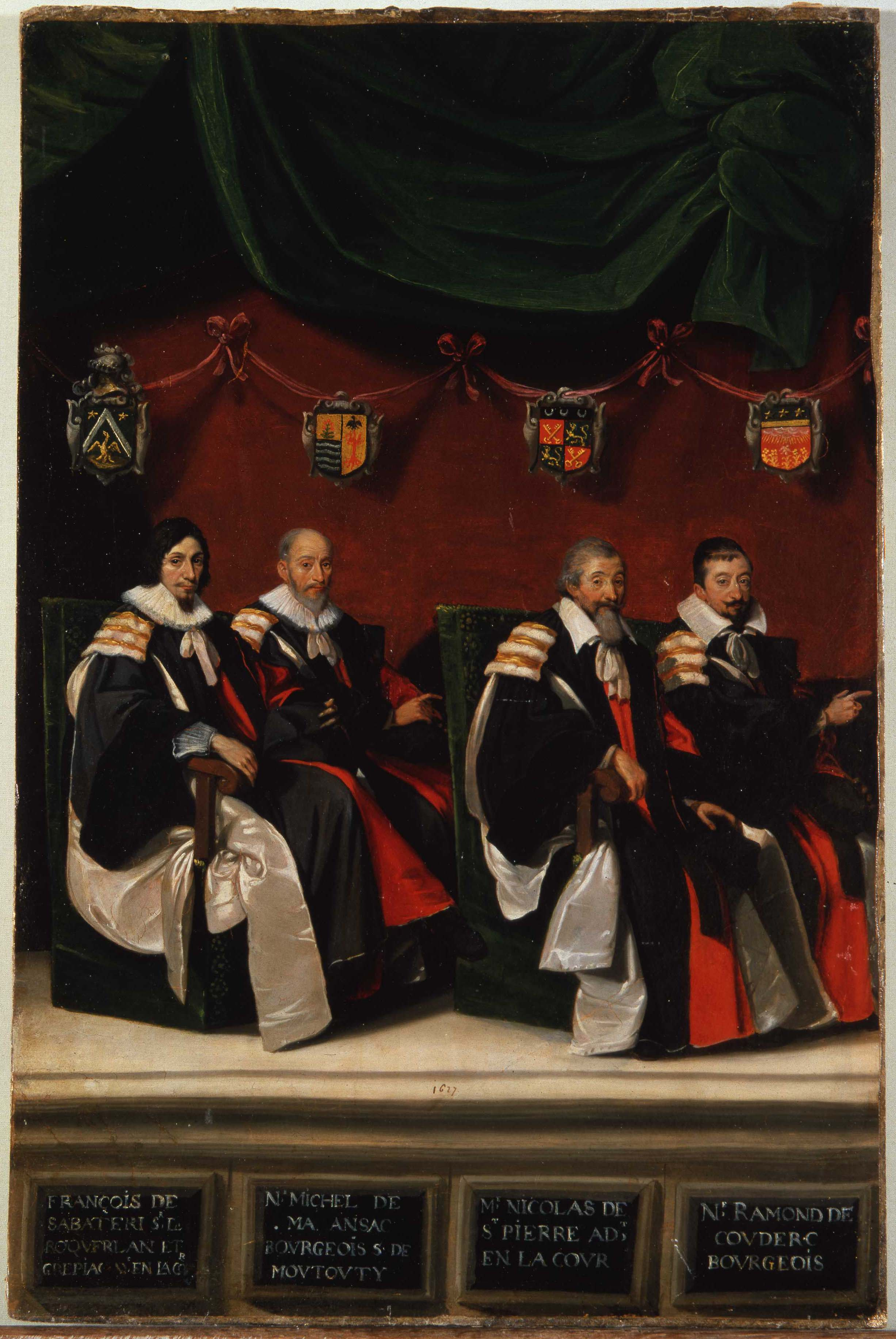
The capitouls of the year 1625–1626, by Jean Chalette.

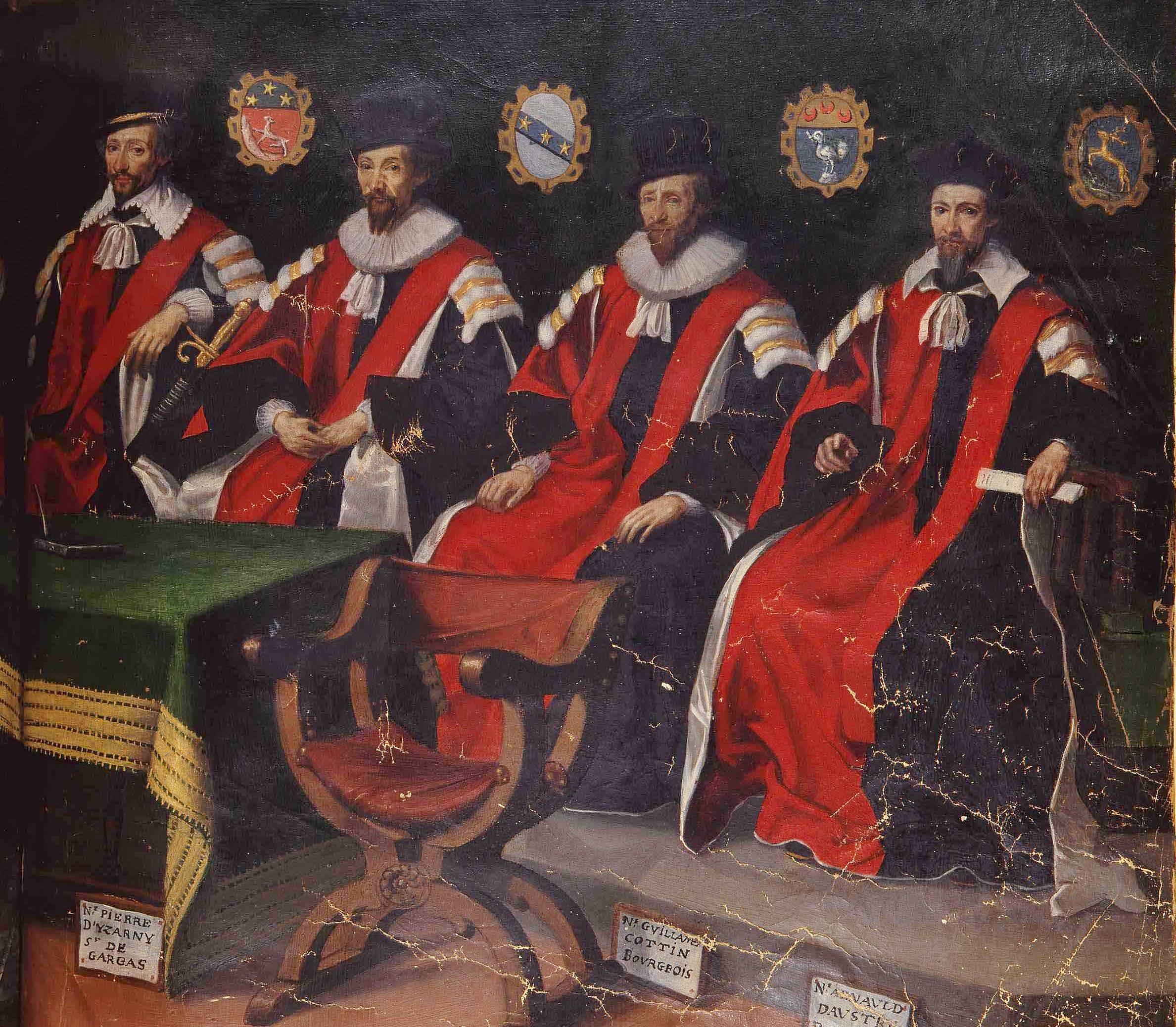
The capitouls of the year 1629-1630 (detail), by Jean Chalette.

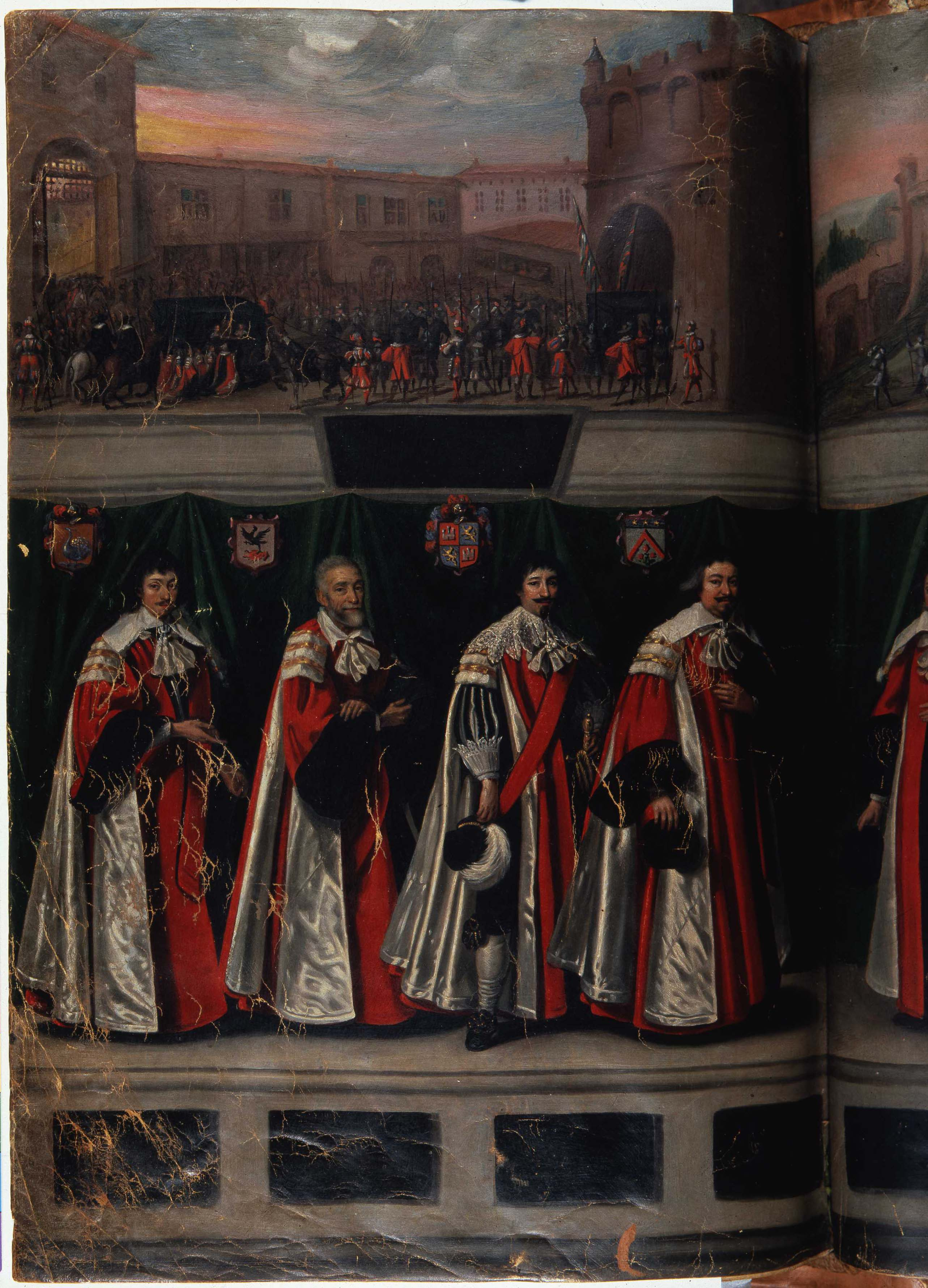
The capitouls of the year 1631-1632 (left part) and the entry of King Louis XIII, by Jean Chalette.

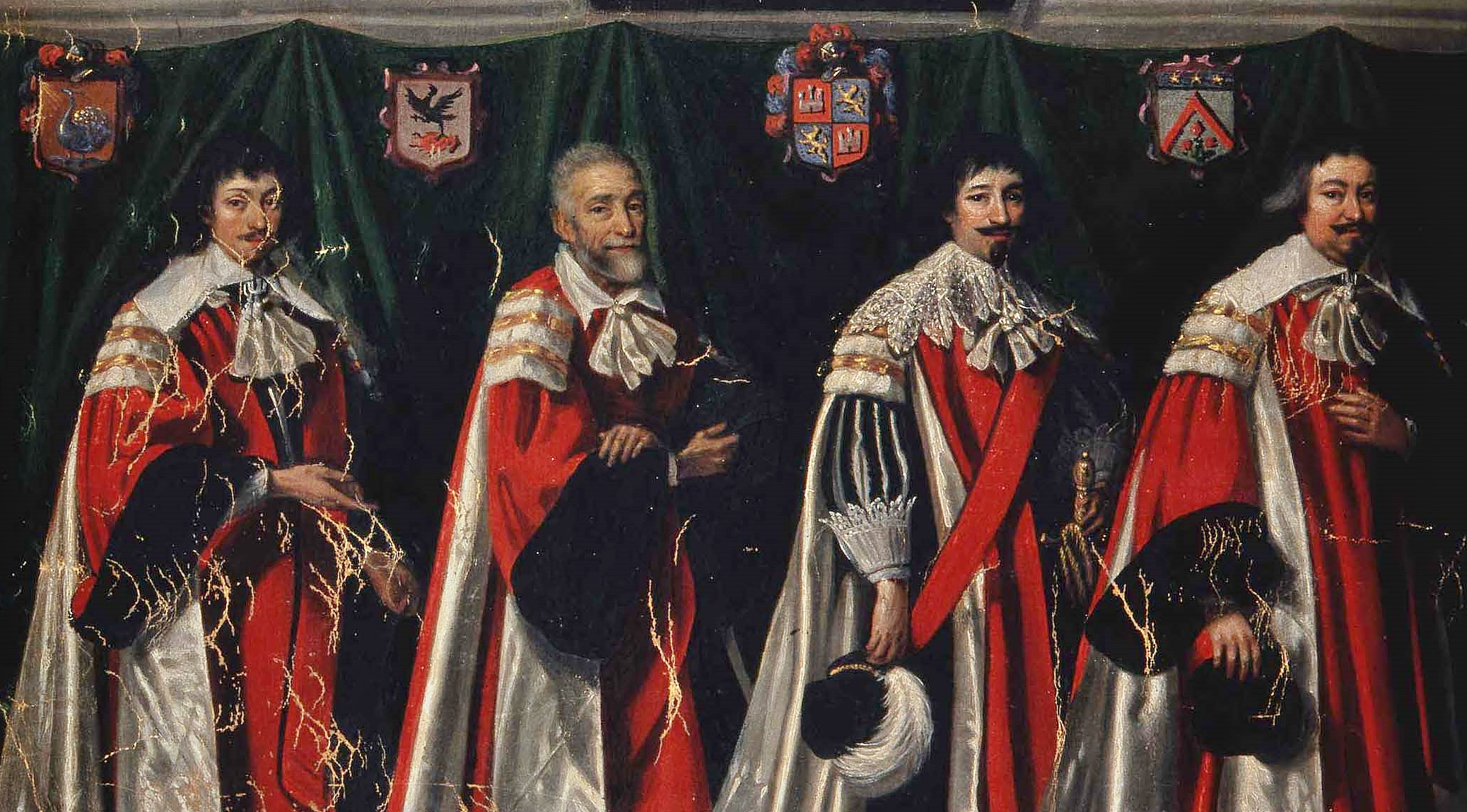
Detail of the previous one, by Jean Chalette.

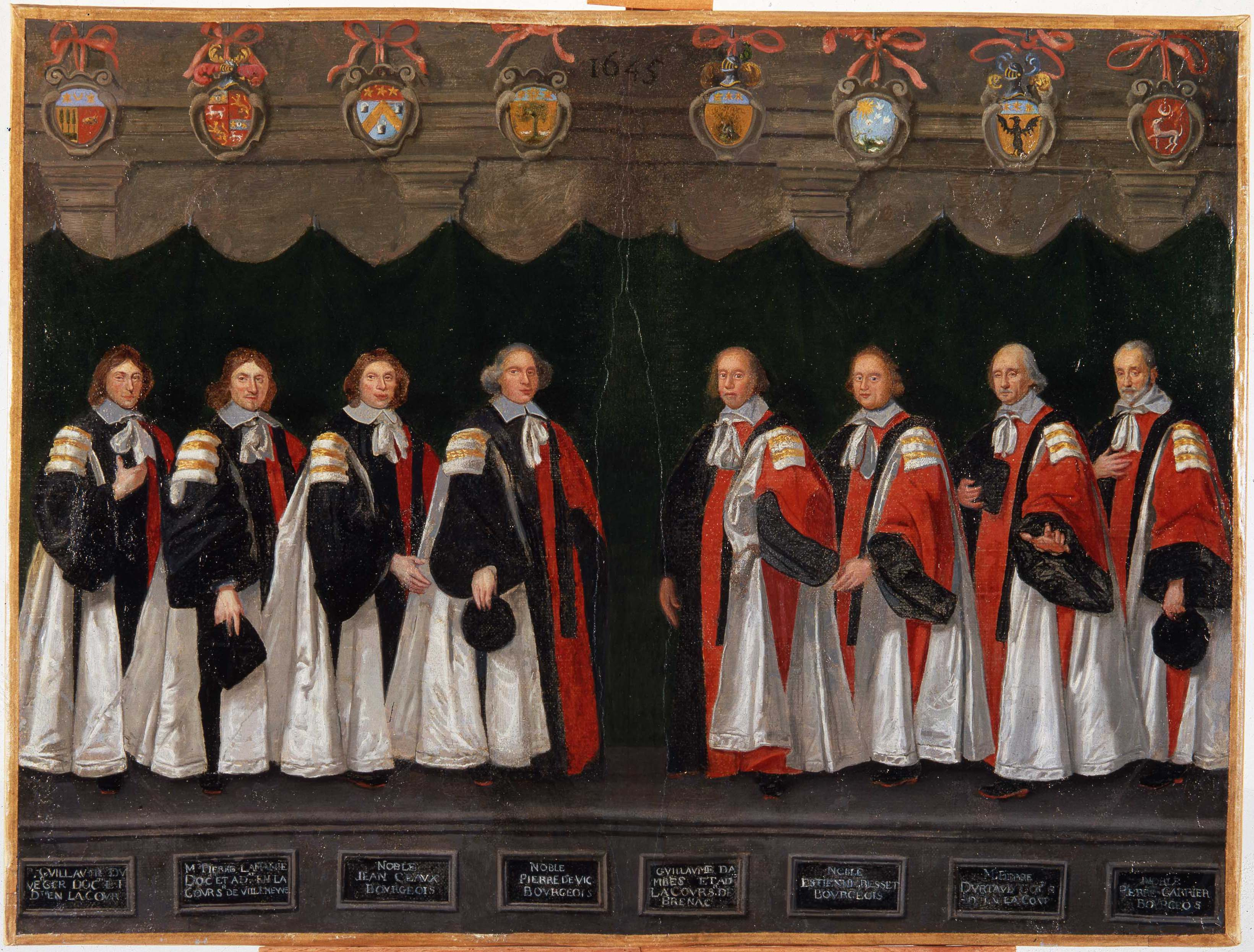
The capitouls of the year 1644–1645, by Antoine Durand.

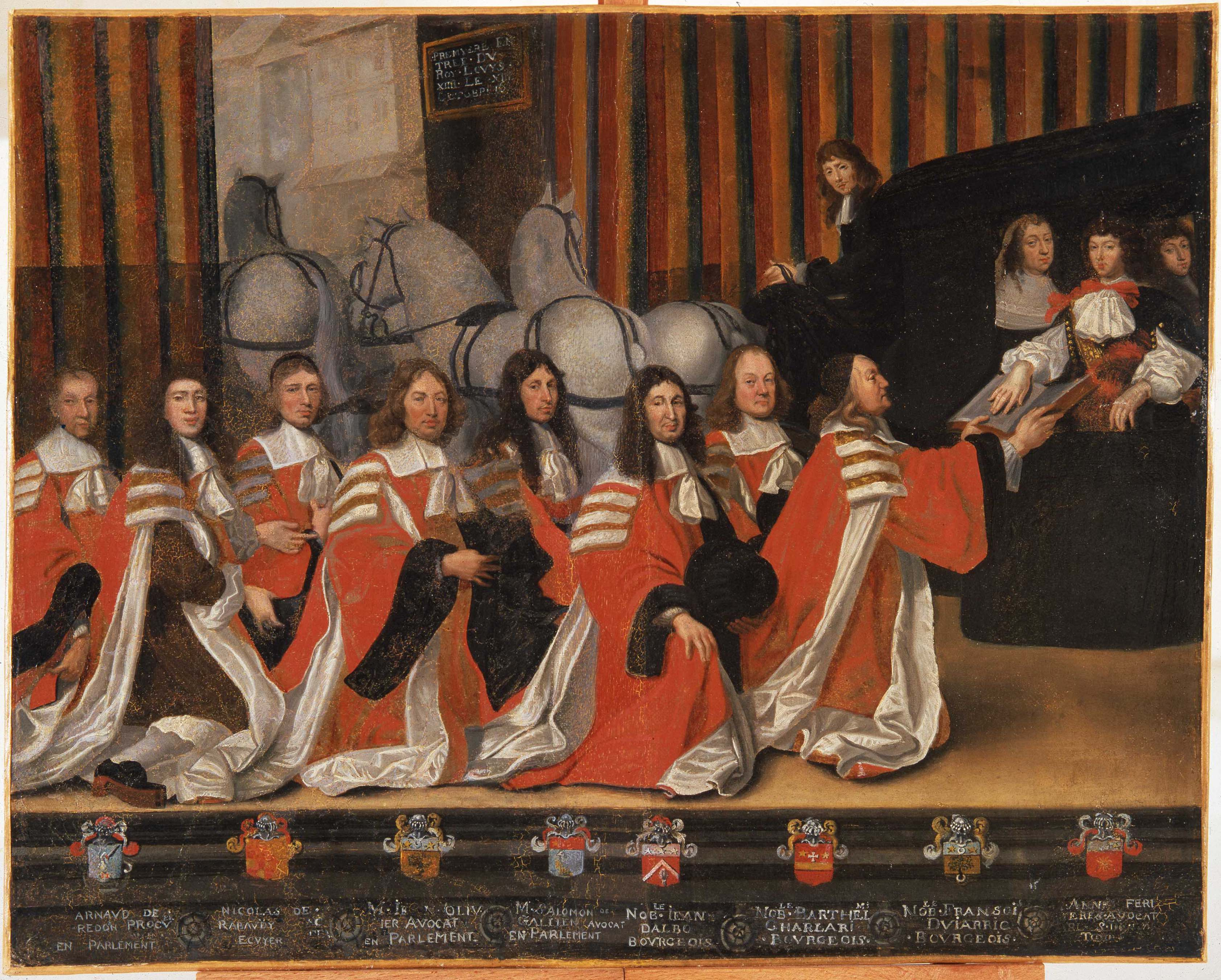
The capitouls of the year 1658-1659 and the entry of Louis XIV, by Antoine Durand.

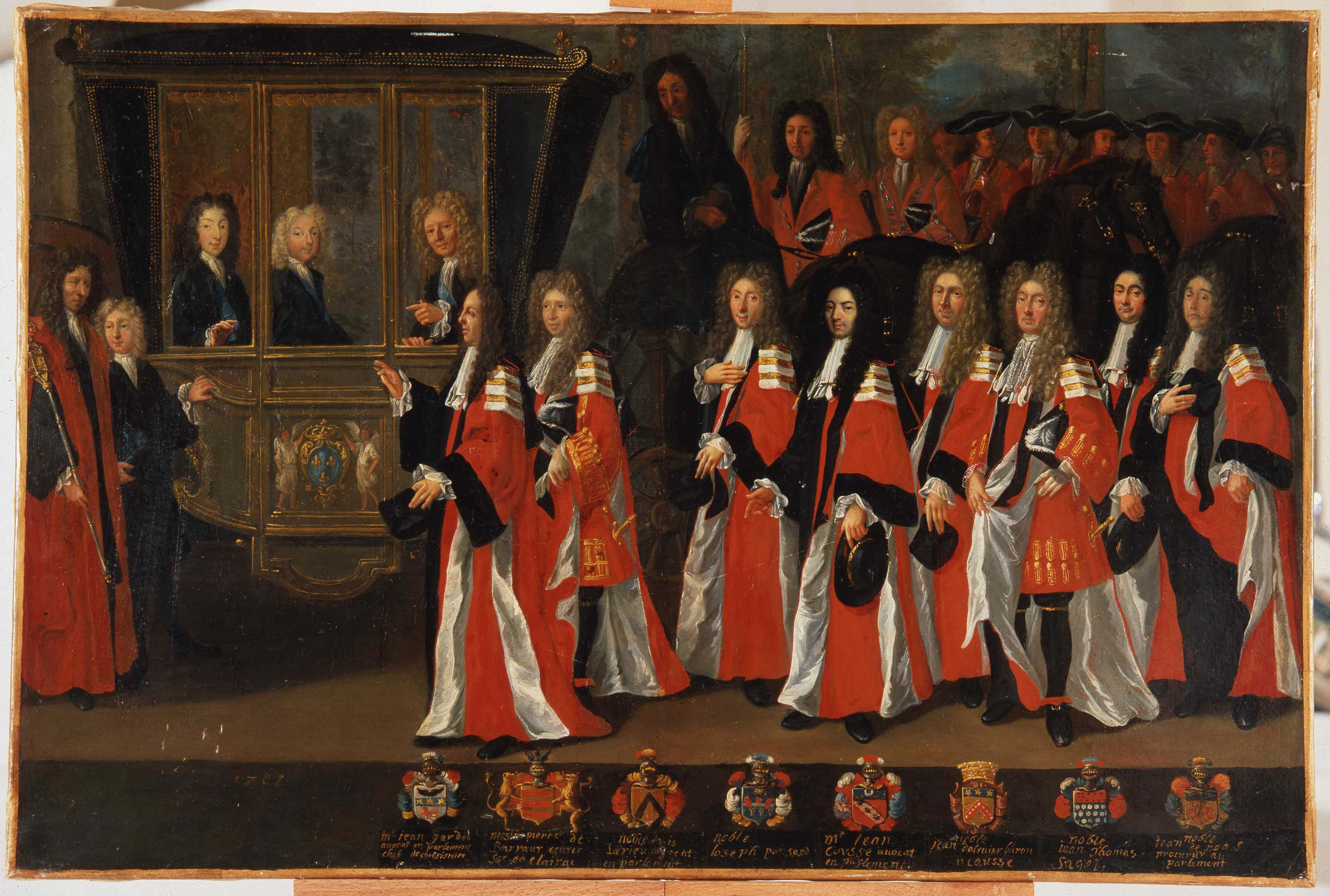
The capitouls of the year 1700-1701 and the entry of the Dukes of Burgundy and Berri, by Jean Michel.

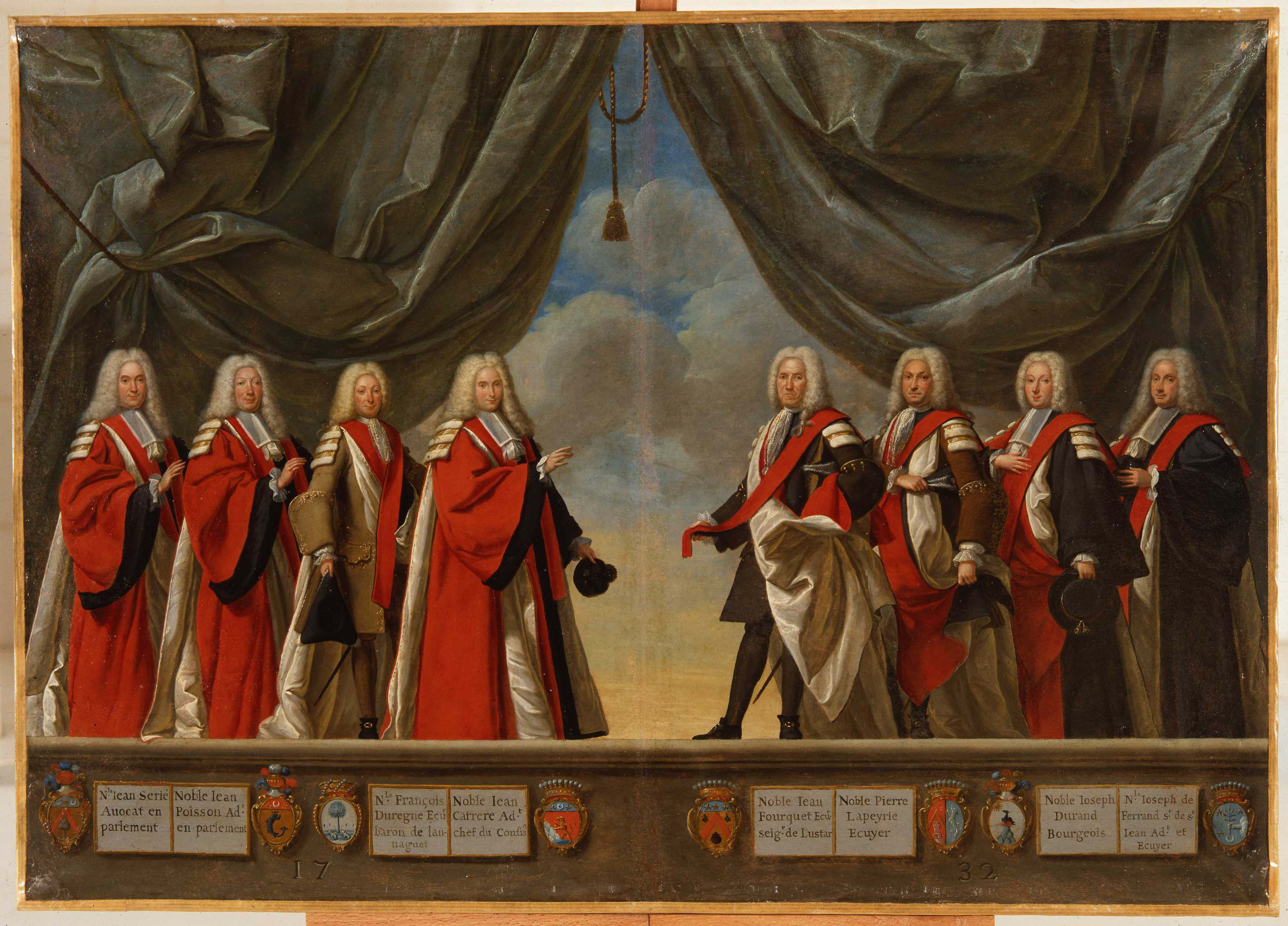
The capitouls of the year 1731–1732, by Antoine Rivalz.

== Bibliography ==
- Christian Cau, Les capitouls de Toulouse - L'intégrale des portraits des Annales de la Ville, 1352-1778 (Capitouls of Toulouse – The complete portraits of the Annals of Toulouse, 1352–1778). Privat editor, 1990.

== See also ==
- Capitoul
