= Jean Chalette =

French painter

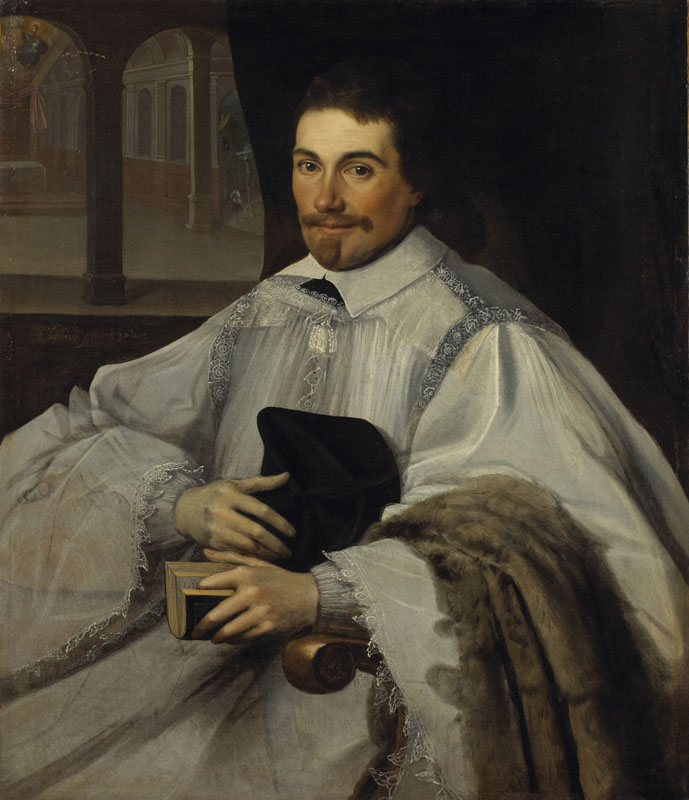
Portrait de Chanoine by Jean Chalette, Musée des Augustins, 1623

Jean Chalette (27 December 1581 (baptised) – 2 October 1643) was a French miniature and portrait painter.

Chalette was born in Troyes, where he at first practised his art. In 1581 he was summoned to Toulouse to decorate the Hôtel-de-Ville, and there gained so much renown that he settled in that city, where he died in 1643.
