= Dean Koontz bibliography =

Author bibliography

This is a list of every work (novels, short stories, etc.) by American novelist Dean Koontz.

== Series ==
=== Black Cat Mysteries / Mike Tucker Series ===
Title	Year	Type	Pages	Notes
Blood Risk	1973	novel	160	As Brian Coffey
Surrounded	1974	novel	220	As Brian Coffey
The Wall of Masks	1975	novel	167	As Brian Coffey

=== Moonlight Bay Series ===
Title	Year	Type	Pages	Notes
Fear Nothing	1998	novel	400	
Seize the Night	1999	novel	416	
Ride the Storm	N/A	novel		(not published yet)

=== Odd Thomas Series ===
#	Title	Year	Type	Pages	Notes
1	Odd Thomas	2003	novel	400	
2	Forever Odd	2005	novel	400	
3	Brother Odd	2006	novel	464	
4	Odd Hours	2008	novel	432	
4.1	Odd Interlude (novella)	2012	novella	253	A three-part ebook. Published as a paperback in 2013.
5	Odd Apocalypse	2012	novel	368	
6	Deeply Odd	2013	novel	335	
6.1	Odd Thomas: You Are Destined to Be Together Forever	2014	novella	38	Ebook
7	Saint Odd	2015	novel	352	

==== Odd Thomas Graphic Novel Prequels ====
#	Title	Year	Type	Pages	Notes
1	In Odd We Trust	2008	graphic novel	204	with Queenie Chan
2	Odd Is on Our Side	2010	graphic novel	186	with Queenie Chan
3	House of Odd	2012	graphic novel	216	with Queenie Chan

=== Frankenstein Series ===
Title	Year	Type	Pages	Notes
Prodigal Son	2005	novel	512	
City of Night	2005	novel	496	
Dead and Alive	2009	novel	352	
Lost Souls	2010	novel	350	
The Dead Town	2011	novel	423	

=== Makani Trilogy ===
Title	Year	Type	Pages	Notes
Last Light	2015	novella	84	Ebook.
Final Hour	2015	novella	82	Ebook.
Troubled Times	2018	novella	N/A	Audio only, found in Darkest Desires
Darkest Desires: The Makani Trilogy	2018	omnibus	N/A	Audio only.

=== Jane Hawk Series ===
	Title	Year	Type	Pages	Notes
1	The Silent Corner	2017	novel	464	
2	The Whispering Room	2017	novel	528	
0.5	The Bone Farm	2018	novella	N/A	Audio only
3	The Crooked Staircase	2018	novel	512	
4	The Forbidden Door	2018	novel	464	
5	The Night Window	2019	novel	448	

=== Nameless ===
==== Season One ====
	Title	Year	Type	Pages	Notes
1	In the Heart of the Fire	2019	novella	62	Ebook.
2	Photographing the Dead	2019	novella	58	Ebook.
3	The Praying Mantis Bride	2019	novella	61	Ebook.
4	Red Rain	2019	novella	50	Ebook.
5	The Mercy of Snakes	2019	novella	61	Ebook.
6	Memories of Tomorrow	2019	novella	55	Ebook

==== Season Two ====
	Title	Year	Type	Pages	Notes
1	The Lost Soul of the City	2021	novella	109	Ebook.
2	Gentle Is the Angel of Death	2021	novella	66	Ebook.
3	Kaleidoscope	2021	novella	71	Ebook.
4	Light Has Weight, but Darkness Does Not	2021	novella	66	Ebook.
5	Corkscrew	2021	novella	54	Ebook.
6	Zero In	2021	novella	60	Ebook

== Standalone novels ==
Title	Year	Type	Pages	Notes
Star Quest	1968	novel	127	An Ace Double, H-70, b/w Emil Petaja, "Doom of the Green Planet"
Fear That Man	1969	novel	129	from "In the Shield" (1969) and "Where the Beast Runs" (1969)
The Fall of the Dream Machine	1969	novel	131	
The Dark Symphony	1969	novel	205	
Hell's Gate	1970	novel	190	
Dark of the Woods	1970	novel	108	
Beastchild	1970	novel	189	expanded from short story (1970)
Anti-Man	1970	novel	142	expanded from "The Mystery of His Flesh" (1970)
Demon Child	1971	novel	224	as "Deanna Dwyer"
The Crimson Witch	1971	novel		expanded from short story (1970)
Legacy of Terror	1971	novel		as "Deanna Dwyer"
Warlock	1972	novel		
Time Thieves	1972	novel	109	
Starblood	1972	novel		expanded from "A Third Hand" (1970)
The Flesh in the Furnace	1972	novel		
A Darkness in My Soul	1972	novel		expanded from 1968 short story
Chase	1972	novel	212	as "K. R. Dwyer" "extensively revised" into Strange Highways
Children of the Storm	1972	novel		as "Deanna Dwyer"
Dance with the Devil	1972	novel		as "Deanna Dwyer"
The Dark of Summer	1972	novel		as "Deanna Dwyer"
The Haunted Earth	1973	novel		
Demon Seed	1973	novel	320	adapted into a film in 1977, novel rewritten in 1997
A Werewolf Among Us	1973	novel		as "Leigh Nichols"
Shattered	1973	novel	304	as "K. R. Dwyer"
Hanging On	1973	novel		
Strike Deep	1974	novel		as "Anthony North"
After The Last Race	1974	novel		
Nightmare Journey	1975	novel		
The Long Sleep	1975	novel		as "John Hill"
Dragonfly	1975	novel	244	as "K. R. Dwyer"
Invasion	1975	novel	190	as "Aaron Wolfe", revised and rereleased as Winter Moon in 1994
Prison of Ice	1976	novel	408	as "David Axton"
Night Chills	1976	novel	384	
The Face of Fear	1977	novel	320	as "Brian Coffey" and as "K. R. Dwyer"
The Vision	1977	novel	368	
The Key to Midnight	1979	novel	419	as "Leigh Nichols", revised and rereleased in 1995
The Funhouse	1980	novel	336	as "Owen West", novelization based on a screenplay by Larry Block
Whispers	1980	novel	502	
The Voice of the Night	1980	novel	352	as "Brian Coffey"
The Eyes of Darkness	1981	novel	352	as "Leigh Nichols"
The Mask	1981	novel	336	as "Owen West"
The House of Thunder	1982	novel	432	as "Leigh Nichols"
Phantoms	1983	novel	448	
Darkfall	1984	novel	384	originally as Darkness Comes
Twilight	1984	novel	592	as "Leigh Nichols" also as The Servants of Twilight
Twilight Eyes	1985	novel	416	much expanded 1987 as Twilight Eyes, this first version becomes the first half of the 1987 revision
The Door to December	1985	novel	416	as "Richard Paige" also as "Leigh Nichols"
Strangers	1986	novel	526	
Watchers	1987	novel	406	
Shadow Fires	1987	novel	528	as "Leigh Nichols"
Lightning	1988	novel	351	reprinted in 2003 with an author's afterword
Oddkins: A Fable for All Ages	1988	novel	180	
Midnight	1989	novel	480	
The Bad Place	1991	novel	417	
Cold Fire	1992	novel	448	
Hideaway	1992	novel	416	
Dragon Tears	1993	novel	432	
Mr. Murder	1993	novel	496	
Winter Moon	1994	novel	480	rewritten from Invasion
Dark Rivers of the Heart	1994	novel	487	
Icebound	1995	novel	408	revised from Prison of Ice.
Intensity	1995	novel	448	
Ticktock	1996	novel	335	
Sole Survivor	1997	novel	436	
False Memory	1999	novel	784	
From the Corner of His Eye	2000	novel	768	
One Door Away from Heaven	2001	novel	720	
By the Light of the Moon	2002	novel	496	
The Face	2003	novel	608	
The Taking	2004	novel	448	
Life Expectancy	2004	novel	496	
Velocity	2005	novel	496	
The Husband	2006	novel	416	
The Good Guy	2007	novel	400	
The Darkest Evening of the Year	2007	novel	368	
Your Heart Belongs to Me	2008	novel	352	
Relentless	2009	novel	368	
Breathless	2009	novel	352	
What the Night Knows	2010	novel	464	
77 Shadow Street	2011	novel	451	
Innocence	2013	novel	352	
The City	2014	novel	416	
Ashley Bell	2015	novel	560	
Devoted	2020	novel	369	
Elsewhere	2020	novel	364	
The Other Emily	2021	novel	362	
Quicksilver	2022	novel	366	
The Big Dark Sky	2022	novel	390	
The House at the End of the World	2023	novel	416	
After Death	2023	novel	382	
The Bad Weather Friend	2024	novel	380	
The Forest of Lost Souls	2024, November 19	novel	396	
Going Home in the Dark	2025, May 20	novel	395	
The Friend of the Family	2026, January 20	novel	370	
A Storm So Bright and Beautiful	2027, January 19	novel	351	

== Collections ==
Title	Year	Pages	Notes
Soft Come the Dragons	1970	143	
Strange Highways	1995	576	
The Paper Doorway: Funny Verse and Nothing Worse	2001	159	

== Short fiction ==
(The stories up to "Where No One Fell" first appeared in "The Reflector", a magazine issued by Shippensburg University, Pa., when Koontz was a student)

This list does not include short fiction from the Makani Trilogy, Jane Hawk series, Nameless or the Odd Thomas series.

Title	Year	Notes
"This Fence"	1965	
"The Kittens"	1965	Later revised in 1966 as "Kittens" Strange Highways
"Of Childhood"	1965	
"A Miracle is Anything"	1966	
"Cloistered Walls"	1966	
"Flesh"	1966	
"For a Breath I Tarry"	1966	
"Hey, Good Christian"	1966	
"Holes"	1966	
"It"	1966	
"I've Met One"	1966	
"Mold in the Jungle"	1966	
"Sam: the Adventurous Exciting Well-traveled Man"	1966	
"Some Disputed Barricade"	1966	
"Something About This City"	1966	
"The Rats Run"	1966	
"The Standard Unusual"	1966	
"Soft Come the Dragons"	1967	rp in collection Soft Come the Dragons
"To Behold the Sun"	1967	rp in collection Soft Come the Dragons
"Little Goody Two-Shoes Chapter One"	1967	In "SF Opinion #4" (Dean Koontz fanzine)
"Little Goody Two-Shoes Chapter Two"	1967	In "SF Opinion #5" (Dean Koontz fanzine)
"Love 2005"	1968	
"A Darkness in My Soul"	1968	rp in collection Soft Come the Dragons. Expanded into A Darkness in My Soul.
"The Psychedelic Children"	1968	rp in collection Soft Come the Dragons
"The Twelfth Bed"	1968	rp in collection Soft Come the Dragons
"Dreambird"	1968	
"Glunk"	1969	In "SF Opinion #7" (Dean Koontz fanzine, special Vaughn Bode issue); based on Bode's comic strip "Junkwaffel"
"Little Goody Two-Shoes Chapter Three"	1969	In "SF Opinion #7" (Dean Koontz fanzine)
"Whoop, the Dead Gerkle"	1969	In "SF Opinion #7" (Dean Koontz fanzine)
"In the Shield"	1969	Combined with "Where the Beast Runs" as Fear That Man
"Temple of Sorrow"	1969	
"Killerbot!"	1969	rp in Soft Come the Dragons as "A Season for Freedom". Revised and re-issued in 1977.
"The Face in His Belly" Part One	1969	
"Where the Beast Runs"	1969	Combined with "In the Shield" as Fear That Man
"Dragon In the Land"	1969	In Soft Come the Dragons
The Face in His Belly" Part Two	1969	
"Muse"	1969	A Leonard Chris story
"A Third Hand"	1970	rp in Soft Come the Dragons. Expanded as Starblood.
"The Good Ship Lookoutworld"	1970	
"Unseen Warriors"	1970	
"The Mystery of His Flesh"	1970	expanded as Anti-Man
"Beastchild"	1970	expanded as Beastchild
"The Crimson Witch"	1970	slightly expanded as The Crimson Witch
"Shambolain"	1970	
"Nightmare Gang"	1970	
"Emanations"	1970	
"Bruno"	1971	A Jake Ash story; revised rp in Strange Highways
"The Terrible Weapon"	1972	
"Cosmic Sin"	1972	A Jake Ash story
"Altarboy"	1972	
"Ollie's Hands"	1972	Revised and re-issued in 1987, rp in Strange Highways
"A Mouse in the Walls of the Global Village"	1972	In Again, Dangerous Visions; In the original Afterword, Koontz mentions having written Hung, "set in the hippie subculture of a small university", which tried to show that Marshall McLuhan's concept of the global village was "on the right track" and that "our world was already being compressed"; his novel, The Fall of the Dream Machine, and stories, 'A Dragon in the Land', and 'A Mouse..' were extrapolations of the concept.
"Grayworld"	1973	Expanded as The Long Sleep as by John Hill
"The Sinless Child"	1973	
"Wake Up To Thunder"	1973	
"Terra Phobia"	1973	
"The Undercity"	1973	
"We Three"	1974	revised rp in Strange Highways
"The Night of the Storm"	1974	Re-issued as a graphic novel in 1976; revised in Strange Highways
"Down in the Darkness"	1986	rp in Strange Highways
"Weird World"	1986	
"Snatcher"	1986	rp in Strange Highways
"The Monitors of Providence"	1986	collaboration
"The Black Pumpkin"	1986	rp in Strange Highways
"The Interrogation"	1987	
"Hardshell"	1987	revised rp in Strange Highways
"Miss Attila the Hun"	1987	revised rp in Strange Highways
"Twilight of the Dawn"	1987	revised rp in Strange Highways
"Graveyard Highway"	1987	
"Trapped"	1989	Re-issued as a graphic novel in 1992; rp in Strange Highways
"Strange Highways"	1995	short story that appears in the collection Strange Highways
"Santa's Twin"	1996	
"Pinkie"	1998	
"Black River"	2000	
"Robot Santa"	2004	
"Darkness Under the Sun"	2010	60 pages
"The Moonlit Mind"	2011	l 102 pages
"Wilderness"	2013	30 pages
"The Neighbor"	2014	32 pages
"Ricochet Joe"	2017	A Kindle motion book which contains moving pictures and interactive parts; 95 pages

== Non-fiction ==
1. "How to Write Best Selling Fiction" (1981)
2. "Writing Popular Fiction" (1972)
3. "A Big Little Life: A Memoir of a Joyful Dog Named Trixie" (2009)

== Essays and introductions ==
1. "Of Childhood" (Reflector, 1966)
2. "Ibsen's Dream" (Reflector, 1966)
3. Introduction to Great Escapes: New Designs for Home Theaters by Theo Kalomirakis (October 15, 2003). ISBN 9607037456.
4. Foreword to Love Heels: Tales from Canine Companions for Independence (October 1, 2003)
5. Foreword to A Rat Is a Pig Is a Dog Is a Boy: The Human Cost of the Animal Rights Movement by Wesley J. Smith (April, 2009)
6. Foreword to The Girl, the Gold Watch & Everything by John D. MacDonald (2014, Trade Paperback Edition)
