= The Face of Fear =

The Face of Fear may refer to:

- The Face of Fear (novel), a 1977 novel by Dean Koontz
- The Face of Fear (film), a 1990 American thriller television film, based on the novel
- The Face of Fear, a 2018 album by Artillery
