= Mr. Murder =

Mr. Murder may refer to:

- Mr. Murder (film), a 1969 Hindi suspense thriller
- Mr. Murder (novel), a 1993 horror novel by Dean Koontz
  - Mr. Murder (miniseries), a 1998 American science fiction-crime thriller television miniseries, based on the novel

== See also ==
- Mr & Mrs Murder, an Australian crime comedy television series
