= Chase (novel) =

1972 novel by Dean Koontz

- First edition
- Author: Dean Koontz (as K. R. Dwyer)
- Language: English
- Genre: Suspense, psychological thriller
- Publisher: Random House
- Publication date: 1972
- Publication place: United States
- Media type: Print (paperback)
- Pages: 178
- ISBN: 0-394-47990-4

Chase is Dean Koontz's first hardcover novel, originally written under the name K. R. Dwyer and released in 1972, it was revised and reissued in 1995 within Strange Highways.

== Plot summary ==
Chase is the story about Benjamin Chase. "Benjamin Chase is a retired war hero living in an attic apartment. He is struggling with a drinking habit. One night he rescues a young woman from an obsessed killer. As a result, the killer has changed his target to Chase. He begins phoning Chase and warning that he is out for revenge. The killer, simply named "The Judge" is threatening to kill Chase but the police don't believe him as he has a history of alcohol-related incidents.

Chase is forced to take matters into his own hands and attempts to unmask The Judge himself and end the threat of a vengeful lunatic."

== Reception ==
In reviewing Chase as a part of Strange Highways, Kirkus Reviews said the book was mostly thrilling while the Orlando Sentinel panned the novel.
