= The Tears of Dragons =

The Tears of Dragons may refer to:

- Tears of the Dragon, a single by Bruce Dickinson
- Dragon Tears, a novel by Dean Koontz
- Tears of Dragon (용의 눈물) a South-Korean film.
