= The Passengers (1977 film) =

1977 film

- Directed by: Serge Leroy
- Written by: Christopher Frank; Dean R. Koontz
- Produced by: Léo L. Fuchs
- Starring: Jean-Louis Trintignant
- Cinematography: Walter Wottitz
- Music by: Claude Bolling
- Release date: 9 March 1977
- Running time: 96 minutes
- Countries: France; Italy
- Language: French

The Passengers (French: Les Passagers, Italian: Viaggio di paura) is a French 1977 drama film directed by Serge Leroy and starring Jean-Louis Trintignant. It was released in the United States as The Intruder. It is based on Dean Koontz's 1973 novel Shattered.

== Cast ==
- Jean-Louis Trintignant as Alex Moineau
- Mireille Darc as Nicole
- Bernard Fresson as Fabio
- Richard Constantini as Marc
- Adolfo Celi as Boetani
- Angela Goodwin
- Yves Barsacq
