= Cold Fire =

Cold Fire may refer to:

Burning process

- Cold Fire (2016), a wildfire that burned in Yolo County, California
- Cold fire (Noongar fire type), a fire type used by Noongar people

Entertainment

- Cold Fire (Koontz novel), a 1991 novel by Dean Koontz
- Cold Fire (Pierce novel), a 2002 novel by Tamora Pierce
- "Cold Fire" (Star Trek: Voyager), a 1995 episode of Star Trek: Voyager
- "Cold Fire" (song), a 1993 song by Rush from the album Counterparts
- The Land Before Time VII: The Stone of Cold Fire, a 2000 direct-to-video film in The Land Before Time franchise

== See also ==
- Cool flame, a flame having maximal temperature below about 400 °C (752 °F)
- Coldfire (disambiguation)
