= The Eyes of Darkness =

1981 novel by Dean Koontz

- First edition
- Author: Dean Koontz (as Leigh Nichols)
- Language: English
- Genre: Suspense
- Publisher: Pocket Books
- Publication date: May 10, 1981
- Publication place: United States
- Media type: Print (paperback)
- Pages: 369
- ISBN: 0-671-82784-7
- OCLC: 34817463

The Eyes of Darkness is a thriller novel by American writer Dean Koontz, released in 1981. The book focuses on a mother who sets out on a quest to find out if her son indeed died one year ago, or if he's still alive.

== Plot ==
A year after her son Danny dies in an alleged accident on a camping trip, stage producer Tina Evans starts receiving paranormal signals insinuating that the boy is still alive. Having never seen Danny's deceased body, she plans to exhume his corpse to put her mind to rest. Assisting Tina is a newly acquainted lawyer Elliot Stryker, formerly working for Army Intelligence, with whom she is having an affair. They are soon targeted by assassins hired by Project Pandora and barely escape alive. Tina, strongly convinced that Danny is still alive, sets out to discover what really happened to her son and rescue him. Elliot accompanies her and the pair are chased by other agents instructed to kill them. Tina is telepathically guided by Danny to an underground lab in Sierra Nevada where her son has been subjected to horrific experiments by a top secret governmental organisation.

== Characters ==
- Christina (Tina) Evans – Danny's mother
- Michael Evans – Danny's father and Tina's ex-husband
- Elliot Stryker – Tina's partner and love interest
- Danny Evans – Tina and Michael's son
- Harold Kennebeck – judge
- Carlton Dombey – scientist for Project Pandora
- Aaron Zachariah – scientist for Project Pandora
- George Alexander – boss of Project Pandora
- Jack Morgan – pilot
- Vivienne Neddler – Tina's house maid
- Willis Bruckster – assassin hired by Project Pandora
- Bob – assassin hired by Project Pandora
- Vince – assassin hired by Project Pandora

== Planned television adaptation ==
According to author Dean Koontz in the afterword of a 2008 paperback reissue, television producer Lee Rich purchased the rights for the book along with The Face of Fear, Darkfall, and a fourth unnamed novel for a television series based on Koontz's work. The Eyes of Darkness was assigned to Ann Powell and Rose Schacht, co-writers of Drug Wars: The Camarena Story, but they could never deliver an acceptable script. Ultimately, The Face of Fear is the only book of the four made into a television movie.
