= Watchers (novel) =

1987 novel by Dean Koontz

- First edition
- Author: Dean Koontz
- Language: English
- Genre: Suspense Horror
- Publisher: Putnam
- Publication date: February 1987
- Publication place: United States
- Media type: Print (hardcover & paperback)
- Pages: 352
- ISBN: 0-399-13263-5
- OCLC: 14213987
- Dewey Decimal: 813/.54 19
- LC Class: PS3561.O55 W38 1987

Watchers is a 1987 suspense novel by American author Dean Koontz. Along with Strangers, Lightning, and Midnight, Watchers is credited with establishing Koontz's status as a best-selling author.

== Plot summary ==
Travis Cornell, a former Delta Force operator, feels that his life has become pointless, and is exploring a canyon near his home when he encounters two genetically engineered creatures that have escaped from a top-secret government laboratory. One, a Golden Retriever with enhanced intelligence, befriends Travis; the other, a creature known as the Outsider, appears to be trying to kill the dog. After eluding the Outsider, Travis takes the dog home. On discovering the dog's exceptional intelligence, he names him Einstein.

Later, he and Einstein find and rescue Nora Devon in a park, who was being pestered by a dangerous man, Arthur Streck. Together they form a trio.

Travis, Nora, and Einstein are soon on the run not only from the Outsider, but from federal agents, determined to track down the laboratory escapees, and Vince Nasco, a ruthless professional assassin, hired by Soviets to kill several human targets who carried knowledge of how to stop the Outsider, in order to further the destruction of the Outsider. He wants the dog to trade for a great sum of cash, alone, without any knowledge from the Soviets or others.

== Characters ==
Travis Cornell
A 36-year-old retired soldier who spent much of his enlisted career as a Delta Force operator. After leaving the military he became a successful real estate broker, but retired from that as well. He thinks he is finally "set". As a result of his many disappointments throughout his life, and the many people close to him who died, he has become depressed and cynical. When he meets Nora Devon and Einstein, all of this changes, and he begins to enjoy life once again.

Nora Devon
A 30-year-old recluse who has lived with her Aunt Violet since she was two. Ridiculed and tormented by her aunt throughout her life, Nora has lost any sense of self-worth and is barely able to go outside her house. She longs to reach out and become a part of the world, and learns to do so through her relationships with Travis and Einstein.

Einstein
A genetically altered golden retriever, created in a top-secret government laboratory, that has acquired a level of intelligence rivaling that of some human beings. Forms a close relationship with Travis and Nora.

The Outsider
Another genetically engineered life-form created in the same laboratory as Einstein. The Outsider, whose appearance is monstrous and terrifying, was treated with scorn and contempt, resulting in a deep hatred of human beings, and especially of Einstein. His base form is a baboon, but with his most dangerous features enhanced, e.g., claws and jaws.

Vince Nasco
A freelance assassin who believes that he absorbs the souls of those he kills, and that if he absorbs enough souls, he will eventually become invincible. Nasco is hired by an unknown client to assassinate every scientist that has worked in the laboratory where Einstein and The Outsider were created. Nasco discovers Einstein and forms a plan to capture Einstein and ransom it for financial gain.

Arthur Streck
Nora's stalker (not main character)

Lemuel Johnson
An NSA agent assigned to lead hunt for Einstein and The Outsider, following their preceding breakout from the laboratory. He is an atychiphobiac due to his stern and harsh upbringing by his father, a self-made upper-middle class black man who believes failure is never acceptable.

== Adaptations ==
A series of low-budget horror films was loosely based on the book.

- Watchers (1988)
- Watchers II (1990)
- Watchers III (1994)
- Watchers Reborn (1998)

In the film adaptation Travis is a sixteen-year-old boy, and Nora is his mother. The Outsider is renamed OXCOM, and Vince Nasco is replaced by NSO agents searching for the monster. Travis also has a girlfriend named Tracey.
