= Your Heart Belongs to Me (disambiguation) =

"Your Heart Belongs to Me" is a song by The Supremes.

Your Heart Belongs to Me may also refer to:

- "Your Heart Belongs to Me" (Hind song), the Dutch entry in the Eurovision Song Contest 2008
- Your Heart Belongs to Me (novel), a novel by Dean Koontz
- "My Heart Belongs to Me" (Barbra Streisand song)
- "Your Heart Belongs to Me" (The Supremes song)
- "Dil Mere Naam" (transl. Your Heart Belongs to Me), a song by Rahul Mishra and Sonu Nigam from the 2025 Indian film Ek Deewane Ki Deewaniyat
