= Winter Moon =

Winter Moon may refer to:

- Winter Moon (album), a 1980 album by Art Pepper
- "Winter Moon", song by Bradley Joseph on the 1999 album Solo Journey
- Winter Moon, revised reissue of Invasion, a 1975 novel by Dean Koontz
- Winter Moon, a 2017–2024 webcomic/webtoon series by Merryweather Media
