= Rykoff =

Rykoff may refer to:

- Rykoff, character in The Silent Battle
- Alan, Jorja and Marcie Rykoff, characters in Strangers (Dean Koontz novel)
