= Watchers Reborn =

- Official DVD cover
- Directed by: John Carl Buechler
- Written by: Sean Dash
- Based on: Watchers by Dean R. Koontz
- Produced by: Darin Spillman
- Starring: Mark Hamill; Lisa Wilcox; Stephen Macht
- Music by: Terry Plumeri
- Distributed by: New Concorde Home Entertainment
- Release date: June 30, 1998
- Running time: 90 minutes
- Country: United States
- Language: English

Watchers Reborn (also known as Watchers 4) is 1998 American science fiction horror film is the 1994 sequel to the horror film Watchers 3 and it is the fourth and final installment in the Watchers film series. Directed by John Carl Buechler and starring Mark Hamill, the film is loosely based on the 1987 novel Watchers by Dean Koontz.

== Plot ==
Ever since he lost his wife and son in a devastating fire, Detective Jack Murphy has wandered around life in a fog. He is forced to face his terrifying memories when his partner Gus is killed in a manner too brutal to be human, too clever to be animal. The only clues to Gus's death are a vagabond Golden Retriever and Dr. Grace Hudson, the beautiful scientist who seeks him out.

Dr. Hudson tells Jack that Einstein, the dog, is actually one half of a super-secret government experiment. With an IQ of 140, the dog was designed as a tracker for a genetically engineered killing machine known as the Outsider. Jack and Grace must stop the Outsider from killing again while preventing Lem Johnson, a pitbull, and the NSA from terminating the experiment, killing everyone who has knowledge of its existence.

== Cast ==
- Mark Hamill as Detective Jack Murphy
- Lisa Wilcox as Dr. Grace Hudson
- Stephen Macht as Lem Johnson
- Gary Collins as Gus Brody

Jason Voorhees actor Kane Hodder, who had previously worked with Buechler on Friday the 13th Part VII: The New Blood, has a minor role sans make-up. Also, musical legend Lou Rawls has a minor role as the coroner.

== Release ==
The sequel did not receive a theatrical release, and instead it went straight-to-video. The film was released on a DVD by New Concorde Home Entertainment in 2004.
