= Icebound =

Icebound may refer to:

- Icebound (play), a 1923 play by Owen Davis
- Icebound (film), a 1924 silent film, based on the play
- Icebound (novel), a 1995 novel by Dean Koontz
- Ice Bound: A Woman's Survival at the South Pole, a 2003 TV movie starring Susan Sarandon
