= Darkfall (disambiguation) =

Darkfall is a 2009 MMORPG video game.

Darkfall may also refer to:

- Darkfall (Koontz novel), a 1984 novel by Dean Koontz
- Darkfall (Carmody novel), a 1997 novel by Isobelle Carmody
- Dark Fall, a 2002 horror video game
- "Darkfall", a song by God Is an Astronaut on the 2007 album Far from Refuge
- Dark Fall, a group of characters in the anime television series PreCure Splash Star
