= The Key to Midnight =

1979 novel by Dean Koontz

- First edition
- Author: Dean Koontz (as Leigh Nichols)
- Language: English
- Genre: Suspense, horror
- Publisher: Pocket Books
- Publication date: 1979 (1995 in paperback)
- Publication place: United States
- Media type: print
- Pages: 392
- ISBN: 0-671-80915-6
- OCLC: 32377348
- Preceded by: The Vision
- Followed by: The Funhouse

The Key to Midnight is a suspense-horror novel by American writer Dean Koontz, released in 1979 under the pseudonym Leigh Nichols. It is considered Koontz's first success.

== Overview ==
In the 1995 paperback edition, Koontz states that The Key to Midnight "is not like anything else I have done"; he also explained that he revised the novel for that year's edition, cutting 30,000 words and adding 5,000. In August 2010, Koontz released a "better" version in Paperback.

== Plot synopsis ==
Lisa Chelgrin is a US Senator's daughter. Her life has been erased and true past blocked. Her imposed, fake new identity is Joanna Rand. A detective, Alex Hunter, is hired to track Lisa down, but he finds nothing. Years later, during a vacation in Kyoto, Japan, he views a lounge act in which Lisa Chelgrin performs. Her name is different than it was before, and she is older, now working as the nightclub owner and singer. Nevertheless, the detective knows it is she. He sends for his dead-case file, and his privately employed messenger is almost killed delivering it. Someone is watching him and Lisa.

At the same time, a person known as The Doctor (Inamura) is trying to find a way around Lisa's memory block. He assumes that by removing a "password" or "pass-phrase," he can access Lisa's true memories. Under hypnosis, however, Lisa can only repeat the phrase "tension, apprehension, and dissension have begun," instead of answering the questions The Doctor asks her about her true past. After the first series of events, Lisa and Alex try to deal with their respective pasts so they can survive.

== Characters ==
- Lisa Chelgrin/Joanna Rand
- Alex Hunter
- The Doctor/ Omi Inamura
- Mariko
- Franz Rotenhausen/ The Hand
- Tom Chelgrin/ Ilya Lyshenko
- Wayne Kennedy
- Ursula Zaitsev
- Anson Peterson/ Anton Broskov
- Antonio Paz
- Ignacio Carrera
- Marlowe
