= Watchers 3 =

- Official DVD cover
- Directed by: Jeremy Stanford
- Written by: Michael Palmer
- Based on: Watchers by Dean R. Koontz
- Produced by: Luis Llosa; Roger Corman (Executive Producer)
- Starring: Wings Hauser; Gregory Scott Cummins; Daryl Keith Roach
- Distributed by: New Concorde Home Entertainment
- Release date: June 10, 1994
- Running time: 84 minutes
- Country: United States
- Language: English

Watchers 3 is a 1994 American science fiction horror film sequel to the 1990 horror film Watchers II and it is the third installment in the Watchers film series directed by Jeremy Stanford. Starring Wings Hauser, the film is loosely based on the 1987 novel Watchers by Dean Koontz. Produced by Roger Corman, Watchers 3 was shot entirely on location in Peru.

== Plot ==
A top secret experiment spawns two highly intelligent life-forms: Einstein, a Golden Retriever with an IQ of 175; and the Outsider, a deformed monstrosity that exists to kill and to avenge its creators. When the Outsider escapes into the jungles of South America, the government sends in Ferguson and some ex-military convicts to catch the beast. But what starts out as a high-speed chase ends in carnage. Only Einstein knows the Outsider's motives, and only the canine can outsmart the creature.

== Cast ==
- Wings Hauser as Ferguson
- Gregory Scott Cummins as Benetti
- Daryl Keith Roach as Nat (credited as Daryl Roach
- John Linton as MacCready (credited as John K. Linton)
- Lolita Ronalds as Gomez
- Frank Novak as Stratten
- William Butler as Tom (uncredited)
- Alex The Dog as Einstein The Dog

== Release ==
This sequel did not receive the benefit of a theatrical release as the original did. Instead, it went straight-to-video. The film was released on a DVD by New Concorde Home Entertainment in 2003.
