= The Door to December =

1985 novel by Dean Koontz

- First edition
- Author: Dean Koontz (as Richard Paige)
- Language: English
- Genre: Suspense, mystery
- Publisher: Signet Books
- Publication date: 1985
- Publication place: United States
- Media type: Print (paperback)
- Pages: 405
- ISBN: 0-451-13605-5
- OCLC: 49979655
- LC Class: CPB Box no. 2015 vol. 7

The Door to December is a horror novel by author Dean Koontz, released in 1985. It was originally released under the pseudonym Richard Paige.

== Plot synopsis ==
When a pair of renowned psychologists are brutally murdered, Laura McCaffrey is called to assist in the case. Meeting with Dan Haldane, a police lieutenant, she is told that one of the victims was her divorced spouse, Dylan, who kidnapped their only daughter six years ago. While inside the crime scene, police notify Lieutenant Haldane of a naked young girl wandering the streets of Los Angeles in a daze. It turns out that the girl was Melanie McCaffrey, Laura's daughter. She was found in a catatonic, autistic state, and is sent to the hospital. It soon becomes apparent that Dylan was using his only child in a series of experiments that combined science and the occult. Unfortunately, it has resulted in unintended and deadly consequences.
