= Coldfire =

Coldfire may refer to:

- Atari Coldfire Project
- Coldfire (comics)
- Coldfire Trilogy, sci-fi trilogy
- NXP ColdFire, microprocessor architecture

== See also ==
- Cold Fire (disambiguation)
