= The Mask (Koontz novel) =

Thriller novel by Dean Koontz

- First edition
- Author: Dean Koontz (as Owen West)
- Language: English
- Genre: Mystery, Suspense
- Publisher: Jove Books
- Publication date: 1981
- Publication place: United States
- Media type: Paperback
- Pages: 305
- ISBN: 0-515-05695-2
- OCLC: 27721515

The Mask is a thriller novel by American writer Dean Koontz originally released under the pseudonym Owen West in 1981. Koontz later re-released the novel under his own name.

== Plot summary ==
An amnesic blonde girl appears in the middle of traffic on a busy day. Carol and Paul, a married couple, are drawn to her, seeing her as the child they never had, they take her in. Then Carol begins to have nightmares about ghastly noises in the dead of night, a bloody face in a mirror, and a razor-sharp ax.
