= Twilight Eyes =

1985 novel by Dean Koontz

- Cover of Twilight Eyes
- Author: Dean Koontz
- Language: English
- Genre: Horror
- Publisher: Berkley Publishing
- Publication date: 1987
- Publication place: United States
- Media type: Print (hardback and paperback)
- Pages: 464 pp
- ISBN: 0-425-10065-0
- OCLC: 16510349
- LC Class: CPB Box no. 2503 vol. 11

Twilight Eyes is a horror novel by American writer Dean Koontz, released in 1985 (the original version, published by Land of Enchantment) and 1987 (expanded version, Berkley). Throughout the book, a character with the self-appointed name "Slim MacKenzie" uses his psychic powers to hunt Goblins – a kind of monster that seems to have the ability to mimic human beings.

== Plot summary ==
The book begins with Slim sneaking up on, and killing, a "goblin or beast" on the fair grounds of a local carnival. Goblins are monsters which can shapeshift between human and bestial forms, genetically engineered super-predators which desire bloodshed and human misery. Created in an ancient, technologically superior era of human civilization, they exist to torment and ultimately murder humans. Their true form can only be seen by a few people, including Slim himself. While they appear and act as a normal person would, goblins experience only negative emotions like fear and hate. Their only pleasure is in torturing and murdering humans.

Slim's "Twilight Eyes", which are colored purple like the skyline at dusk, give him the ability to receive psychic, or prophetic, premonitions of the future. They also allow him to see through the human-like disguise of the goblins.

After this encounter, Slim proceeds to join the carnival (one of many he has drifted to) as a way to support himself while killing goblins and hiding from his murderous past, in which he killed an uncle by marriage that was a goblin responsible for the deaths of several family members. One of the prominent members of the "carnies" is a young woman named Rya Raines, who quickly becomes his lover and confidant. As their relationship matures, Slim has several more run-ins with the goblins which leads to the revelation that a fellow carnie Joel, and even Rya herself, can see the goblins too, and that each of them in their own way has suffered terribly from the goblins' actions in their past. It is revealed that Rya had long before made a pact with the goblins to report to them whenever she found someone who could see through their disguise in exchange for safety from their predations. She wants Slim to make the same pact with them, but he refuses. This creates a gulf between her and Slim that comes to bloodshed between them. She regrets this later and after reconciling with Slim she becomes his wife. They decide to go on a mission to destroy any and all of the creatures they possibly can.

Together they set out on a personal mission to wage a secret war against the monsters in a small mining town named Yontsdown, Pennsylvania, the seeming center of their cruel and brutal version of civilization. There they discover and face the ultimate plans that the goblins have for the world and all of mankind.

== Differences in the two versions ==
This book was released in two entirely different forms. The first hardback printing was actually only the first half of the story. The full text appeared for the first time in America in the paperback edition. The hardback was first released in a limited edition with four variations:

- Trade Hardcover
- Collector's Edition (numbers 1 through 50)
- Signature Edition (numbers 51 through 250)
- Lettered Edition (24 copies marked A through Y)

They are identical except the trade hardcover was issued without the patterned leatherette slipcase which accompanied the various signed editions. The Signature Edition, the Collector's Edition and the Lettered Edition have a limitation page signed by both Dean Koontz and Phil Parks, the illustrator. The Collector's Edition was identical to the Signature Edition but included a special inscription by Koontz and an original drawing by Parks. The 24-copy Lettered Edition was divided between Koontz, Parks, and publisher Christopher.

== Reception ==
In October 2016, Madeline Raynor of Entertainment Weekly recommended Twilight Eyes in a list of clown-themed horror novels.

In December 2023, Twilight Eyes was one of 673 books that were removed from teachers' classroom libraries in Orange County, Florida due to state laws.
