= The House of Thunder =

1982 novel by Dean Koontz

- First edition
- Author: Dean Koontz (as Leigh Nichols)
- Language: English
- Genre: Horror, Suspense
- Publisher: Pocket Books
- Publication date: 1982
- Publication place: United States
- Media type: Print (Paperback)
- Pages: 342
- ISBN: 0-671-43266-4
- OCLC: 25904321

The House of Thunder is a horror novel written by best-selling author Dean Koontz, released in 1982. The book was originally published under the pseudonym Leigh Nichols.

== Summary ==
The novel revolves around a woman named Susan Thorton, who wakes up in a hospital bed with no recollection of her past or how she got there. Her physician, Dr. McGee, helps Susan recover some of her memory, including that of an antisemitic hate crime she witnessed years earlier that led to the death of her fiance, but she can't seem to recall anything related to the company where she works or her recent past. Phone calls from her colleagues do nothing to jog Susan's memory.

In the meantime, Susan begins having dreams and vivid hallucinations connected to her fiance's murder. The men responsible for the crime show up at the hospital, although they claim not to recognize her and none of them appear to have aged at all, despite the fact that over a decade has passed. The men begin tormenting Susan, who must decide whether or not she can trust Dr. McGee as she tries to discover if the men are ghosts, doppelgangers, or if these horrific experiences only exist in her mind.
