= Mr. Murder (miniseries) =

- Genre: Crime thriller Science fiction
- Based on: Mr. Murder by Dean Koontz
- Screenplay by: Stephen Tolkin
- Directed by: Dick Lowry
- Starring: Stephen Baldwin
- Theme music composer: Louis Febre; Mark Snow
- Country of origin: United States
- Original language: English
- No. of episodes: 2

Production
- Producers: Kenneth Kaufman; George Jackson; Ann Kindberg; Dean R. Koontz; Rob Lee; Doug McHenry; Debbie Smith
- Cinematography: Greg Gardiner
- Editor: Brent White
- Running time: 193 minutes
- Production companies: Elephant Walk Entertainment; Endemol Entertainment; Patchett Kaufman Entertainment; Pro 7

Original release
- Network: TVNZ
- Release: September 21, 1998
- Network: ABC
- Release: April 26 – April 29, 1999

Mr. Murder is a 1998 American science fiction-crime thriller television miniseries starring Stephen Baldwin based on the 1993 book of the same name by Dean Koontz. It was first broadcast in New Zealand on September 21, 1998. The first part then aired on ABC in the United States on Monday, April 26, 1999, at 9:00 p.m. and the finale aired on Thursday, April 29, at 9:00 p.m.

== Synopsis ==
Father and Son Drew Oslett Sr.(James Coburn) and Jr. (Thomas Haden Church) are shadowy operatives who create assassins and now through pioneering genetically engineering and cloning intend to create a perfect untraceable assassin. After electrocuting their intended candidate to gain his DNA, the tissue samples are contaminated and replaced by those belonging to Marty Stillwater (Stephen Baldwin) who is a successful mystery novel writer. Seven years later his clone Alfie is genetically engineered to be a perfect soldier and has been conditioned to be a remorseless killing machine. But unbeknownst to his creators he has developed a telepathic bond with Marty along with Remote Viewing capabilities. The clone is jealous of Marty's life and family, and intends to replace Marty. This intention prompts the Osletts to take a hit out on all the Stillwaters.

== Cast ==
- Stephen Baldwin as Marty Stillwater / Alfie
  - Ryan O'Donohue as Young Alfie Stillwater
- Julie Warner as Paige Stillwater
- Bill Smitrovich as Lieutenant Lowbock
- Thomas Haden Church as Drew Oslett Jr.
- James Coburn as Drew Oslett Sr.
- Kaley Cuoco as Charlotte Stillwater
- Brittney Lee Harvey as Emily Stillwater
- Don Hood as James Stillwater
- K Callan as Alice Stillwater
- Dan Lauria as General Aames
- Don McManus as Carl Clocker
- Dennis Creaghan as General Greydon Lamont
- Bertila Damas as Detective Beatrice Del Rio
- Richard Riehle as John Wexel
- Brandon Smith as Senator James Ewald

== Production ==
Koontz sold the film rights to Mr. Murder to Savoy Pictures after the book's publication. The adaptation was initially scheduled to be a big budget theatrical feature in 1996 starring Bruce Willis as Marty Stillwater and to be directed by Uli Edel. However, this version never came into fruition.

With the feature film unable to get off the ground, the rights were sold to a different production company that developed the project as a miniseries on a much smaller budget. This adaptation was directed by Dick Lowry from a teleplay by Stephen Tolkin. The cast included Stephen Baldwin as Marty Stillwater, Julie Warner as Paige Stillwater, Thomas Haden Church as Drew Oslett Jr., and James Coburn as Drew Oslett Sr., a character not in the book. It was broadcast in New Zealand on September 21, 1998, and was later broadcast in the United States on ABC on April 26 and April 29, 1999.

== Reception ==
Ray Richmond of Variety.com gave the miniseries a negative review, writing that it did not make any sense and that the only difference between the identical twins was their manner of speaking.
