= Darkfall (Koontz novel) =

1984 novel by Dean Koontz

- First edition (UK, with original title)
- Author: Dean Koontz
- Original title: Darkness Comes
- Cover artist: Graham Potts
- Language: English
- Genre: Horror
- Publisher: W. H. Allen (UK); Berkley Books (US)
- Publication date: Feb 1984 (UK); Oct 1984 (US)
- Publication place: United States
- Media type: Paperback
- Pages: 351
- ISBN: 0-491-03152-1
- OCLC: 11997351

Darkfall is a horror novel by the best-selling author Dean Koontz, released in 1984. The novel is also known as Darkness Comes.

== Synopsis ==
Jack Dawson, a New York City detective, is dealing with a variety of situations in his life. His wife Linda died, leaving him the sole caretaker for their two children, Penny and Davey. He is also forced to confront an especially brutal string of murders of Mafia criminals, which have been seemingly done by animals even though no living creature would simply tear a victim to pieces without actually eating anything. Finally, his work partner Rebecca, with whom he begins a tentative personal relationship, dismisses his eventual belief that there may be supernatural or magical factors in the killings.

In truth, these creatures have been called forth from hell by a bocor named Baba Lavelle. Because of their small size, Lavelle assumed were just minor demons and the portal to Hell is not yet big enough to accommodate greater entities. At the end of the novel, Dawson is surprised to see that the portal has grown so big it has engulfed the shed where it is concealed. Numerous tentacles have sprouted from the pit and dragged Lavelle to hell. When Jack sees this, he comes to the conclusion that this was just a mere finger of a greater evil that was about to come. When holy water doesn't stop the pit from growing, Jack uses his blood from a wound inflicted by a tentacle to stop the pit. He fears that if he fails, he will be forced to sacrifice himself into the pit. The novel ends with all the denizens turning to mud and Jack hearing Rebecca say "I love you Jack" in thin air.

== Television adaptation ==
According to Koontz in the afterword of a 2008 paperback reissue of The Eyes of Darkness, television producer Lee Rich purchased the rights for this book along with The Face of Fear, The Eyes of Darkness, and a fourth unnamed novel for a television series based on Koontz's work. Koontz himself wrote the script for Darkfall. A change in studio heads, however, resulted in the project being put into turnaround as the new head of the network, according to Koontz, "didn't want to make a movie about 'little creatures living in the walls.'" Ultimately, The Face of Fear was the only book of the four made into a television movie.
