= Dragonfly (Koontz novel) =

1975 novel by Dean Koontz

- Author: Dean Koontz
- Language: English
- Genre: Suspense, mystery
- Publisher: Random House
- Publication date: 1975
- Publication place: United States
- Media type: Print (Hardback & Paperback)
- Pages: 244
- ISBN: 0-394-49214-5
- OCLC: 1288456
- Dewey Decimal: 813/.5/4
- LC Class: PZ4.K8335 Dr PS3561.O55

Dragonfly is a suspense-mystery novel by American writer Dean Koontz, released under the pseudonym K. R. Dwyer in 1975. The book has not been re-issued since.

== Plot summary ==
An innocent man has been turned into a walking time bomb. In 4 days, he will kill 100,000 people.
