= Farhad Mann =

American film director

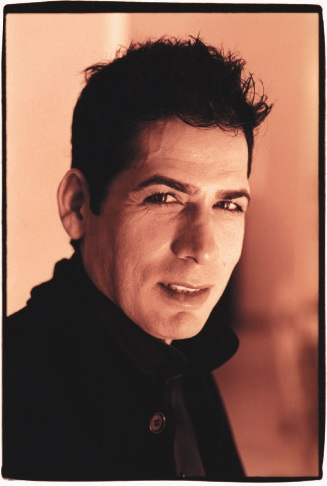
- Education: ArtCenter College of Design
- Occupations: Film, television, and commercial director
- Years active: 1987–present

Farhad Mann (Persian: فرهاد من) is an American director, screenwriter of film, television and commercials, and owner of the production company FMPI.

Mann has directed episodes for television series such as Beauty & the Beast, The Listener, Murdoch Mysteries, and Aaron Stone, as well as many television films. Notable feature films he has directed include Lawnmower Man 2: Beyond Cyberspace (which he also wrote) for New Line Cinema, and Fighting for Freedom. The pilot episode of Max Headroom ("Blipverts") that he directed for ABC won several Emmys. The next pilot he directed, Nick Knight, was developed by CBS into the long-running Forever Knight.

Mann directed the TV movie adaption of Dean Koontz's novel, The Face of Fear. He most recently directed the TV movies A Mother's Crime, The Past Never Dies, and A Killer In My Home.

Mann is also the creator and owner of the Los Angeles–based commercial production company FMPI, a producer of campaigns for domestic and international clients.

== Early life and education ==
Mann earned his Masters Film Degree with Distinction at the ArtCenter College of Design in Pasadena. His student film Frames, a short black comedy about an obsessed filmmaker and his girlfriend, won an Emmy and 17 international First Place awards, including at the New York Film Festival. Director Lee Strasberg saw Frames on Showtime and invited Mann to study in his Masters Program where he directed several theatrical productions.

== Company ==
FMPI is a company that produces commercials, television, feature films and integrated media.

== Filmography ==
Film

Year	Title	Director	Writer	Producer
1995	Return to Two Moon Junction	Yes	No	No
1996	Lawnmower Man 2: Beyond Cyberspace	Yes	Yes	No
2013	Fighting for Freedom	Yes	No	Yes

Short film

- Don't Panic It's Organic (2013)

TV movies

- Nick Knight (1989)
- The Face of Fear (1990)
- Stranger in My Home (1997)
- His and Her Christmas (2005)
- In Her Mother's Footsteps (2006)
- Devil's Diary (2007)
- The Lost Treasure of the Grand Canyon (2008)
- The Toyman Killer (2013)
- Til Death Do Us Part (2014)
- Fatal Memories (2015)
- The Game of Love (2016)
- Hopeless, Romantic (2016)
- Twist of Fate (2016)
- Can't Buy My Love (2017)
- Daughter for Sale (2017)
- A Mother's Crime (2017)
- The Past Never Dies (2019)
- A Killer In My Home (2020)
- Mixed Baggage (2022)

TV series

Year	Title	Notes
1987	Max Headroom	Episode "Blipverts"
1988	Knightwatch	Episode "Knights of the City"
1998-1999	V.I.P.	4 episodes
2000	Diagnosis Murder	Episode "A Resting Place"
2004	1-800-Missing	Episode "Cop Out"
2004-2005	Wild Card	3 episodes
2005	Young Blades	Episodes "The Invincible Sword" and "To Heir Is Human"
2005	Strong Medicine	Episode "Broken Hearts"
2007	Painkiller Jane	3 episodes
2008-2019	Murdoch Mysteries	5 episodes
2008	ReGenesis	Episode "What It Feels Like"
2010	Aaron Stone	Episodes "Damage Control" and "In the Game of the Father"
2011-2013	The Listener	5 episodes
2016	Beauty & the Beast	Episode "Love Is a Battlefield"
2018	In Contempt	4 episodes
2022	Coroner	2 episodes
2022	Circuit Breakers	2 episodes

== Commercials ==
Mann has directed several trendsetting commercials for multiple national campaigns. These include Pepsi, Budweiser, Coors, McDonald's, Coca-Cola, Toyota, American Express, Chevrolet, and also for several agencies including Saatchi & Saatchi, Ogilvy & Mather, Grey Worldwide, DDB Worldwide, McCann-Erickson, J. Walter Thompson, Leo Burnett, Young and Rubicam.

These commercials have won many awards including, Clios, International film & TV festival of New York, Houston International film festival, IFPA CINDY award, Art Directors Club of New York, and U.S. Television Commercials Festival Chicago.
