= David Herrington =

British photography director

- Born: England, United Kingdom
- Occupation: Cinematographer

David Martin Herrington is a British-born director of photography, noted for his work in advertising, film and TV. He graduated from the London School of Technology and began his career as a cinematographer as an apprentice while working for the Rank Organization in London, England. He emigrated to Toronto, Ontario, Canada, and joined the staff of Film House to become chief timer and technical director before deciding to follow his passion of becoming a director of photography.

Herrington now lives in Los Angeles where he has worked on commercials for Dodge, Lincoln, Mercury, Toyota, McDonald's, Hallmark, Sony, Sears, Coca-Cola and AT&T.

He has been nominated and won numerous awards for his commercials including a Bronze Lion (Cannes Film Festival), and several Bessie Awards (Canadian Advertising Awards). In 1995, Herrington received a coveted Commercial CSC award for his work on Frigidaire's I Am a Chef.

During shooting of a commercial with John Landis, Herrington was asked to film Blues Brothers 2000. He went on to film many TV and theatrical projects, including 1-800-Missing for three seasons, and Shoot 'Em Up for Peter Pau and Michael Davis.

== Filmography ==
Year	Title	Role	Notes
1986	A Judgment in Stone		
1988	Primo Baby		
1998	Blues Brothers 2000		
1991	Love & Murder		
2002	You Stupid Man		
2013	Fighting for Freedom		
2014	E.M.S.		
2015	Death Valley		
TV
Year	Title	Genre	Notes
1986	Kay O'Brien	(TV series)	
1986	A Deadly Business		
1988	War of the Worlds	(4 episodes, 1988–1989)	
1990	A Quiet Little Neighborhood, a Perfect Little Murder		
1990	Common Ground		
1992	Deadly Matrimony		
1994	Hostage for a Day		
1999	The Hoop Life	(TV series)	
2000	The Color of Friendship		
2001	Jenifer		
2001	Final Jeopardy		
2002	Verdict in Blood		
2002	A Killing Spring		
2003	America's Prince: The John F. Kennedy Jr. Story		
2004	Carry Me Home		
2005	1-800-Missing	(12 episodes)	
2005	Plague City: SARS in Toronto		Gemini Award nomination for Best Photography in a Dramatic Program or Series
2006	The House Next Door		
2006	The Accidental Witness		
2007	The Best Years	(9 episodes)	
2008	True Confessions of a Hollywood Starlet		
2009	Deadliest Sea		
2009	Ny-Lon		
2011	Nikita		
2011	Transporter: The series (TV Series)		
2011	Warehouse 13		
2011	Republic of Doyle		
