= 77 Shadow Street =

2011 novel by Dean Koontz

- First edition hardback cover
- Author: Dean Koontz
- Language: English
- Genre: Horror, science fiction, thriller
- Published: 2011 (Bantam Books)
- Publication place: United States
- Media type: Print (hardback, paperback), e-book, audiobook
- Pages: 451
- ISBN: 9780553807714
- Followed by: Odd Apocalypse

77 Shadow Street is a New York Times Bestselling 2011 sci-fi horror novel by American author Dean Koontz, and his 101st novel. The book was first released on December 27, 2011, through Bantam Books, and follows a diverse group of individuals living in an apartment building with a dark history of murder and mystery. The story of 77 Shadow Street is narrated through the viewpoints of each of the building's occupants, including the newer and more sinister characters of One and Witness.

Prior to the book's release in the United Kingdom, 77 Shadow Street was listed as an example of the increased rate of ebook piracy.

== Synopsis ==
The book is set in the Pendleton, an upscale apartment building named after its first owner, Andrew North Pendleton. Years ago in the late 1880s, Pendleton had constructed the building as an extravagant mansion (then named "Belle Vista") for himself and his family, only for his wife and two children to get mysteriously abducted one night. The experience left Pendleton in a state of madness and he lived as a recluse for years. The mansion was purchased years later by the Ostock family, who were murdered in 1935 by their butler. His only explanation before committing suicide was that their murders had been necessary in order to save the world. The house was later purchased and transformed into apartments, however, one of the construction workers went missing during its transformation.

During the ongoing events of the book the current residents of the Pendleton are subjected to a series of bizarre events that include strange creatures and plants, a mysterious person initially known only as "Witness" (later revealed to be an associate of one of the building residents), and a series of monitors that call out the location and description of each of the building residents with the instruction to "exterminate" them. They are unable to seek any outside help, as the building and its surroundings have been reduced to a wasteland filled with the various threats. Adding to the rising threat is the slow realization that the occupants of the building have been transported to the year 2049 and that they are at the mercy of an entity known only as "One". As the story progresses, one of the occupants, a hitman by the name of Mickey Dime, starts killing off the Pendleton's residents one by one even as others are overtaken by the building's various other threats.

The story's climax comes with the group realizing that the futuristic state is a result of the research of one of the Pendleton's occupants, Dr. Kirby Ignis. This research was brought to fruition by another scientist, Dr. Von Nordquist, with the intention of dramatically reducing the human population, which Ignis and Nordquist saw as a serious problem for the world. Ignis is somewhat horrified by the potential future, but swears that if the future dystopia is one possibility, so would a more positive future. Because of his potential destiny to create the world that everyone had traveled to, Ignis is later killed by one of the other residents after they are returned to the present time.

The book ends with Mickey Dime in a mental institution for his crimes and with the other scientist, Nordquist, dying when his car "accidentally" drives off a cliff.

== Reception ==
Critical reception for 77 Shadow Street was mixed. Bloody Disgusting and the Daily Express both gave mostly negative reviews for the novel, with the reviewer for Bloody Disgusting calling it "a boring, under-plotted mess." SFX magazine and RT Book Reviews both gave more favorable reviews, with SFX saying that although the book wasn't "ideal" and that Koontz was "still firmly in the shadow of authors like Stephen King", it was "entertaining" and an "undemanding horror page-turner".
