= Fighting for Freedom =

- Directed by: Farhad Mann
- Written by: Chris Loken
- Starring: Kristanna Loken; Bruce Dern; José María Yazpik; Patricia De León
- Cinematography: David Herrington
- Music by: Julio Reyes Copello
- Production company: Loken Mann Productions
- Release date: September 12, 2013
- Country: United States
- Language: English

Fighting for Freedom is an American drama film written by Chris Loken and directed by Farhad Mann. Starring Kristanna Loken, Bruce Dern, José María Yazpik and Patricia De León. The film premiered in New York on September 12, 2013, at the Fairview Plaza Cinema 3. It had its Los Angeles premiere October 18, 2013, at the Laemmle NoHo 7. On December 3, 2013, the film was released on DVD. Loken Mann Productions is the production company for the film. Grand Entertainment Group is the distribution company for the DVD. Fighting for Freedom portrays the complex illegal immigration crisis to meet the Salazar family and the Dobbe family that employs them.

== Plot ==
Oscar and Maria Salazar, trapped in Mexico, are denied work visas to return to the U.S. Their plight is further complicated by the birth of a child, Angelina; their other two children, born at Love Orchard, are U.S. citizens. Oscar decides to enter the U.S. illegally. He and Maria, carrying Angelina, skirt death crossing the Arizona desert. Their journey is juxtaposed alongside that of Dobbe daughter Karen, a rising star in an arch-conservative law firm. The Salazar family arrives safely, until the authorities raid Love Orchard and order a deportation hearing for the now three-year-old Angelina. The case is taken to Washington by Karen, who, by opting to defend Angelina, befuddles her boss, makes up with her estranged father, and converts her conservative counterpart into her relatively liberal lover.

== Cast ==
- Kristanna Loken as Karen
- Bruce Dern as Christian Dobbe
- José María Yazpik as Oscar Salazar
- Patricia De León as Maria
- Ian Duncan as Jake Grove
