= Shadow Fires =

1987 novel by Dean Koontz

Shadowfires
- First edition
- Author: Dean Koontz
- Language: English
- Genre: Horror
- Publisher: Avon Books
- Publication date: 1987
- Publication place: United States
- Media type: Print (Paperback)
- Pages: 436
- ISBN: 0-380-75216-6
- OCLC: 28011779

Shadowfires is a novel by American writer Dean Koontz, released in 1987. Koontz's attempt at a straightforward horror novel, it was originally released as Shadow Fires under the pseudonym Leigh Nichols, and tells the story of a young woman who, in the process of getting a divorce from her husband of seven years, becomes a widow after a traffic accident. However, her husband's body soon disappears from the morgue, and other bodies are discovered, murdered horribly. The woman, Rachael, and her significant other, Ben Shadway, find themselves learning a secret too terrible for anyone to believe, followed by forces who wish to silence and kill them.

== Plot summary ==
The protagonist of the story is a woman who is in the process of divorcing her abusive husband Eric, an intense scientist at a bio-research company, when he is killed in a traffic accident.

As it turns out, the husband was doing research into immortality, due to an obsession with cheating death stemming from sexual abuse he suffered as a child and the fear that his abuser is waiting for him in Hell. In fact, he experimented on himself using an untested serum designed to grant incredible regenerative abilities.

The husband wakes up in the morgue, but his "immortality" turns out to be flawed; it cannot properly repair brain damage, as the "mind" is made of electrical signals and not just flesh and protein. The trauma from the traffic accident has resulted in him suffering constant pain and a lack of mental clarity. The husband, now an unstoppable killing machine, proceeds to stalk his wife across the country while slowly descending into madness as the return from death causes him to mutate at a rapid pace.

Rachael and her boyfriend Ben Shadway track the reanimated Eric to his secret country hideaway in the hope of killing him before he can regenerate to a level where he would be able to find and kill Rachael. However, Eric outwits them and manages to hide in the trunk of Rachael's car after overhearing her and Ben in conversation discussing their plan to split up and meet in Las Vegas.

As Rachael Leben unwittingly transports Eric toward Las Vegas, she stops off along the way and witnesses Eric emerge from the trunk of her car, now hideously transformed into some kind of indescribable mutant and rapidly mutating. A chase ensues into the desert, but Rachael manages to escape from Eric's clutches while he's feeding on a den of rattlesnakes and finds her way back to her car, setting off again toward Vegas. Some time later Eric kills and eats the driver of a car then rapes, kills, and devours the female passenger before he too sets off to Vegas. Ben Shadway is also being chased by federal agent Anson Sharp, who harbours a 20-year-old grudge against Shadway after the two served in Vietnam together and Shadway exposed Sharp's corruption and illegal smuggling activities, culminating in Sharp being dishonourably discharged from the US army. Partners in Eric Leben's bio-research company are also on the tail of Shadway and Rachael Leben to try to prevent them from exposing the top-secret project that the company was working on to the media but are stopped by Sharp's forces. Sharp seeks to kill them both, to keep Project Wildcard secret and get revenge on Ben.

After a lengthy pursuit across Nevada to Las Vegas, the couple have their final confrontation with Eric at Ben's hotel. Eric's mutation finally stabilizes into a seemingly unstoppable and unrecognizable insectoid form incapable of being slain by the firearms they have. Thinking quickly they pour gasoline on Eric and set him on fire. Consumed by fire, the accelerated metabolism in Eric's mutated body devours itself in an attempt to regenerate and mutate further, reducing his body to ooze and finally killing the genetic abomination but not before Eric's shattered consciousness finally accepts death. Sharp attempts to kill them but one of his own men who realizes how insane Sharp had become shoots Sharp in the head and kills him. With both their enemies dead, Rachael and Ben finally prepare to get married as well as break the story to the press.
