= The Darkest Evening of the Year =

2007 novel by Dean Koontz

- Author: Dean Koontz
- Language: English
- Genre: Psychological thriller
- Publisher: Bantam Books
- Publication date: November 27, 2007
- Publication place: United States
- Media type: Print (hardback)
- Pages: 352 pp (1st edition, hardback)
- ISBN: 0-553-80482-0 (1st edition, hardback)
- OCLC: 153581244
- Dewey Decimal: 813/.54 22
- LC Class: PS3561.O55 D287 2007

The Darkest Evening of the Year is a novel by the author Dean Koontz, released on November 27, 2007. The title is a possible allusion to Robert Frost's "Stopping by Woods on a Snowy Evening".

== Premise ==
Amy Redwing's risk-taking on behalf of desperate dogs is legendary. With money she inherited from a source she will never discuss, she founded and runs a group that rescues abandoned or abused golden retrievers. She has a treasury of astonishing rescue stories—a friend tells her she'll be broke by the time she's 40 if she carries on funding the work. Is it this reckless devotion to her work that prevents her making a commitment to the love of her life, Brian McCarthy? It seems so when a particularly thrilling and bizarre rescue brings Nickie into her care. Nickie is instantly recognized as pack leader by Amy's own two dogs, and her bond with Amy is like no other dog's. But at this moment of joy an unknown and dangerous person arrives on the scene.

Evidence mounts up that Amy is being pursued by those who wish her, Brian and her dogs harm. A handful of murderers are after Brian and Amy, stealing, spying and murdering anyone who gets in their way.

Brian and Amy try and work past their respective dark pasts in order to save each other, their dogs and other innocents caught in the mess.

== Reception ==
Janet Maslin, writing for the New York Times gave a negative review, criticizing the plot, characters, and "tacked-on political or cultural commentary."
