= Your Heart Belongs to Me (novel) =

2008 novel by Dean Koontz

- Cover of Your Heart Belongs to Me
- Author: Dean Koontz
- Cover artist: Tom Hallman
- Language: English
- Genre: Suspense, psychological, psychological thriller, horror, medical thriller, Gothic, science fiction
- Published: 2008 (Bantam Books)
- Publication place: United States
- Media type: Print
- Pages: 352 pp
- ISBN: 0-553-80713-7

Your Heart Belongs to Me is a novel by science fiction/horror writer Dean Koontz. The plot revolves around Ryan Perry, who receives a heart transplant.

== Plot synopsis ==
The book follows a man, Ryan Perry, who is stalked by the reanimated corpse of the woman who donated the heart he received in a heart transplant.

== Reception ==
Publishers Weekly gave the audiobook a negative review, criticizing the narrator and the book's plot. National Review, by contrast, recommended the book and complimented the plot.
