= Icebound (novel) =

1976 novel by Dean Koontz

- Cover of Icebound, English Paperback Edition
- Author: Dean Koontz (as David Axton)
- Original title: Prison of Ice
- Cover artist: Chris Moore
- Language: English
- Genre: Thriller
- Publisher: Ballantine Books
- Publication date: 1976 (first edition)
- Publication place: United States
- Media type: Print (paperback & hardcover)
- Pages: 408 pp
- ISBN: 0-345-38435-0

Icebound is a novel written by Dean Koontz. The book was originally published in 1976 under the title Prison of Ice under Koontz's pseudonym David Axton, and was revised and re-released as Icebound in 1995.

== Plot summary ==
The plot concerns a group of international scientists working for the project of towing an iceberg to be used as relief for droughts. It is headed up by the husband and wife team of Rita and Harold (Harry) Carpenter. Rita secretly has the fear of cold, ice and snow. Due to an unexpected storm, the scientists become stranded on the iceberg with bombs ticking under them. If they do not find a way out, they will perish. A Russian submarine is trying to rescue them, but the rescue is complicated by the ice. Meanwhile, another problem arises. One of the crew members is secretly an assassin with an agenda of his own.

== Publication history ==
Prison of Ice was first published by Lippincott on October 18, 1976 in the United States. It was published by W. H. Allen & Co. in the United Kingdom.

Prison of Ice was re-released as Icebound in 1995, published by Ballantine Books. Koontz had either retained or bought back the rights to his early novels when they were out of print, and sold the rights for seven of his books from the 1970s to Ballantine, including Prison of Ice, for approximately $10 million in the 1990s.
