= Invasion (Koontz novel) =

1975 novel by Dean Koontz

- First edition
- Author: Dean Koontz (as Aaron Wolfe)
- Cover artist: Kelly Freas
- Language: English
- Genre: Suspense, Horror
- Publisher: Laser Books
- Publication date: 1975 (as Invasion); 1994 (as Winter Moon)
- Publication place: United States
- Media type: Paperback
- Pages: 190
- ISBN: 0-373-72009-2
- OCLC: 270840758

Invasion is a 1975 horror novel by American writer Dean Koontz, originally released under the pseudonym Aaron Wolfe. In 1994 Koontz re-released the book under the title Winter Moon, including updates and revisions. Winter Moon is the current title under which the book can be purchased.

== Overview ==
Winter Moon is divided into two parts. Part One: The City of the Dying Day, contains chapters one through thirteen. Part Two: The Land of the Winter Moon, comprises chapters fourteen through twenty-two.

In Los Angeles, a city street turns into a fiery apocalypse. In a lonely corner of Montana, a mysterious presence invades a forest. As these events converge and careen out of control, neither the living nor the dead are safe.

== Plot ==
The story begins with a thirty-two-year-old Los Angeles police officer named Jack McGarvey. Jack is caught in a shootout at a gas station. He kills the gunman but is badly injured and spends months recovering in a hospital. When Jack returns home, the McGarveys receive a letter stating that Jack has inherited the Quartermass Ranch in Eagles Roost, Montana from his late partner's father, Eduardo Fernandez.

While Jack was recovering from his injuries, Eduardo was experiencing strange events in Montana. He sees glowing lights in the trees and hears strange sounds. One night he discovers a massive black circle and suspects it is a portal opened by an alien. Soon after, he notices wild raccoons watching him and intruding in his house. The raccoons all perish strangely, and Eduardo contacts the local veterinarian, Travis Potter. The veterinarian performs an autopsy which does not reveal anything conclusive as to the cause of death. Squirrels and birds now spy on him. Although frightened, Eduardo eventually challenges the traveler to come to him in its true form instead of using animals. One night he hears a shambling on his porch. With shotgun in hand, he opens the door and sees the traveler piggybacking on his late wife's corpse, taken from the family plot on the ranch. Travis Potter discovers Eduardo's body and an autopsy determines he suffered a heart attack.

Jack moves into Eduardo's ranch with his wife, Heather, and son, Toby. They are looking forward to a quiet life in Montana, away from big city crime and a safe place for Toby to attend school. The family adopts a golden retriever named Falstaff, who adores Toby.

The McGarveys soon experience strange things. Both Travis Potter and attorney Paul Youngblood hint that something unusual may have occurred just before Eduardo's death. All three McGarveys have similar recurring dreams of an entity offering promises of happiness if they would let it into their minds, but each senses the promises are false and vehemently refuses the offer. Heather thinks of it as the Giver. The Giver hypnotizes Toby through electronic devices and attempts to communicate with Jack through Toby. The family eventually reveals to one another the similarity of their dreams and different baffling events.

The Giver becomes impatient and bolder, having never previously met resistance with any species. It attempts to trap the family during a blizzard by disabling their vehicles and phone lines. Jack leaves on foot to ask a neighbor to drive his wife and son away from the house, while Heather and Toby remain at the house armed with gasoline cans and guns. Although they barricaded the house, the Giver is able to break in. It appears in two separate forms, each riding a corpse from the ranch's family plot. Heather discovers that bullets do not damage the Giver riding Eduardo's corpse, so she sets the house on fire, hoping the flames will destroy the creature. She shoots at the second corpse, damaging it, and realizes the Givers cannot move easily without their mounts. The first Giver has walked its corpse through the fire, and although it continues to pursue them, Heather sees that the fire has consumed part of it, allowing her some hope. Toby traps the Giver in his mind by tricking it into thinking he accepts its offer, while actually immobilizing the Giver and allowing him, his mother, and Falstaff to escape the house.

Jack is picked up by a snowplow driver, Harlan Moffit, and sees the house on fire when they pull in the driveway. Heather and Toby are carrying gas cans up the back stairs, and Harlan assists the family when Jack tells him of an alien invasion. Toby states that he cannot continue to hold the Giver captive for long, and that the Giver is actually in the caretaker's house. They carry the gasoline cans to the caretaker's house and see a third entity, riding another corpse, held immobile by Toby's imagination. The main body of the Giver is further back in the house and is a massive being which sprouted off the three smaller extensions of itself. Toby continues to hold the being's will in place, and the adults pour gasoline and set the building on fire.

After the authorities have taken everyone's statement, Toby tells his father that, at the very end, the Giver sprouted off a few small worms that tried to escape by boring into the wood. He is not sure if any of them survived, and Jack says that they will leave that to the scientists and authorities to handle. A few weeks later, the family moves back to Los Angeles.

== Characters ==
- Jack McGarvey. Thirty-two-year-old police officer married to Heather McGarvey, and father of Toby McGarvey.
- Heather McGarvey. The wife of Jack McGarvey and mother of Toby McGarvey
- Toby McGarvey. The eight-year-old son of Jack and Heather McGarvey
- Falstaff. A golden retriever adopted by the McGarveys
- Eduardo Fernandez. A lonely man in his 70s, owner of the Quartermass Ranch and father of Jack's late partner
- The Giver/The Traveler. An alien being that desires control of anything that it wishes, living or dead. It does not understand the concept of death and believes that everything in existence is there only for its own use
- Travis Potter. The veterinarian of the town of Eagle's Roost
- Paul Youngblood. Attorney responsible for Eduardo's estate and neighbor of the McGarveys
- Harlan Moffit. A snowplow driver who rescues Jack McGarvey and assists the family in their battle with the Giver
- Anson Oliver. A movie director who shot Jack McGarvey at Arkadian Station
