= Watchers II =

- Promotional release poster
- Directed by: Thierry Notz
- Written by: Henry Dominic
- Based on: Watchers by Dean R. Koontz
- Produced by: Roger Corman
- Starring: Timothy Marlowe; Marc Singer; Tracy Scoggins; Jonathan Farwell; Irene Miracle
- Cinematography: Edward J. Pei
- Edited by: Diane Fingado & Adam Wolfe
- Music by: Rick Conrad
- Production companies: Concorde Pictures; Centaur Films
- Distributed by: International Video Entertainment
- Release date: August 16, 1990
- Running time: 101 minutes
- Country: United States
- Language: English

Watchers II is the 1990 sequel to the 1988 horror film Watchers. Starring Marc Singer and Tracy Scoggins, the film is loosely based on the 1987 novel Watchers by Dean Koontz. It was released on August 16, 1990.

The film's writers were credited under a pseudonym as they were not members of the Writers Guild at the time.

== Plot ==
The film continues the saga of two genetically altered life forms turned loose. One is a super-intelligent golden retriever with an uncanny ability to communicate and reason. The other is a hybrid monster, a non-human assassin created to track the dog and destroy all who come in contact with it.

The golden retriever finds and befriends a fugitive from the Marine Corps. The clever dog prompts the Marine captain to call an animal psychologist from the top secret laboratory where the genetic manipulation occurred. Together with this trusted psychologist, they attempt to elude the murderous monster and the gory trail of death closing in on them.

== Cast ==
- Timothy Marlowe as Jason
- Marc Singer as Paul Ferguson
- Tracy Scoggins as Barbara White
- Jonathan Farwell as Steve Malceno
- Irene Miracle as Sarah Ferguson
- Mary Woronov as Dr. Doris Glatman
- Don Pugsley as Smith (credited as Donald Pugsley)
- Joseph Hardin as Wesson
- Harri James as Bell (credited as Diana James)
- John Lafayette as Watson
- Keisha as Woman At Motel (credited as Raquel Rios)

== Release ==
The sequel did not receive a theatrical release, and instead went straight-to-video on VHS and LaserDisc formats. The film remained out-of-print for many years until September 23, 2003, when both this film and the original were released on a double feature DVD by Artisan Entertainment, although the release was eventually discontinued.

== Reception ==
Variety wrote "Roger Corman’s second try at adapting Dean R. Koontz's bestseller is a marked improvement, yielding a suspenseful thriller."

Scott Weinberg of eFilmCritic.com gave the film a 2.5 out of 5, and stated "Watchers 2 is an improvement of Empire Strikes Back proportions over its predecessor for one distinct reason: Part 2 doesn't have Corey Haim from Watchers in it. The plot is, not at all surprisingly, exactly the same as in the original Watchers, but none of the plot stuff really matters all that much. What's most interesting about Watchers 2 ('most' being a relative term) is that it actually seems to follow much more closely to the Dean Koontz source material than did the original. It's still a painly chintzy and woodenly delivered little affair, but if you happen to be a fan of the novel, Part 2 is the one you'd probably dig the 'most'."

Walter Chaw of Film Freak Central described the film as "A joyless exercise".

J. P. Harris, in his 2001 book Time Capsule: Reviews of Horror, Science Fiction and Fantasy Films and TV Shows from 1987-1991, stated "While a marked improvement over Watchers, Watchers II is hardly more faithful to the wonderful novel; 'improvements' by scripter Dominic include several plot flaws. But the kernel of both films and book are still there. The monster has an awful rubbery suit by Dean Jones and William Star Jones, which is ineffective even as a shadow. The film gives Singer an opportunity to be laughably macho. As in the book, the best scenes are of the dog, played by golden retriever Dakai, using a computer and other displays of intelligence."
