= The Vision (novel) =

1977 novel by Dean Koontz

- First edition
- Author: Dean Koontz
- Language: English
- Genre: Horror, mystery
- Publisher: G. P. Putnam's Sons
- Publication date: 1977
- Publication place: United States
- Media type: Print (Paperback)
- Pages: 287
- ISBN: 0-399-12063-7
- OCLC: 27938037
- Dewey Decimal: 813/.54 20
- LC Class: PS3561.O55 V56 1986

The Vision is a 1977 horror-mystery novel by American writer Dean Koontz.

== Plot summary ==
After being assaulted and mutilated as a child by her family's gardener, Berton Mitchell, Mary Bergen exhibits clairvoyant abilities. With the help of her older brother Alan and husband Max, she aids the police in their murder investigations. However, she can only sense pieces of a crime as they happen in real time.

A few days before Christmas, Mary thwarts a serial killer from claiming another victim. Afterwards, Alan, who has always been jealous of Max for coming into his sister's life and taking over his role as her helper, tries to persuade her once again to divorce him. She refuses. He accepts her decision and leaves for a vacation.

Mary and Max travel home to spend the holidays at their mansion. However, she suddenly has a strong vision of four women being murdered sometime in the future. This has never happened before, as previously she could only have visions as they happen in real time. Max tries to tell her it was just a dream, but is unsure. The next morning, a news report comes on detailing the murder of four women who lived together by a single assailant. Mary thinks she recognizes one of the victims.

Mary attends her weekly meeting with her psychiatrist, who tries to help her get over the traumatic childhood attack by reliving it. She remembers beating wings and an awful voice whispering to her. However, before she can remember Mitchell's face, several glass figurines in the office fly off the shelves and begin pelting the two. The commotion stops only after Mary ceases to think of her assault. That night, Mary has another vision of the same killer murdering three people at a hair salon. Just as she attempts to picture the killer's face, Max's gun animates and begins shooting at them. The couple become convinced they are being haunted by a poltergeist trying to hinder Mary's visions. The next morning, another news report comes out confirming the triple homicide took place. She calls Alan in a panic, who manages to calm her down.

Shortly afterwards, Mary gets another vision that the killer is going to climb a tower in the town of King's Point and snipe residents during a Christmas Eve boat parade. With the blessing of a police chief she knows, Percy Osterman, she and Max travel there to stop the attack. Residing in King's Point is Mary's longtime friend and journalist Lou Pasternak, who they stay with. The three try to figure out who the killer is. Berton Mitchell is brought up, but Mary knows he committed suicide in his jail cell shortly before the trial, always claiming he was innocent. They ask Osterman to investigate Mitchell's wife and son, who they assume to still be alive, as possible suspects.

The next day, Mary tries to envision the killer's face again. However, a flock of seagulls attack her and Max and don't let up until she stops trying. They then travel to the King's Point police station, where they manage to convince the skeptical sheriff, John Patmore, to place officers in every tower in the town. However, no attack takes place that night, much to Patmore's frustration. Afterwards, while eating dinner at Lou's, Mary has another vision of a woman she thinks she recognizes being murdered by the killer.

The next day, the three receive two pieces of bad news. The familiar woman Mary saw in her vision is found dead, and Osterman calls to reveal that Mitchell's wife and son died in an arson attack on their trailer decades previously. Convinced that the sniper killings will really happen, she gets Lou and Max to drive her to a closed fun center with a tower she saw in her visions that night. Mary and Max break into the center while Lou waits in the car as a lookout.

Mary is wracked with more visions of flapping wings and memories of her childhood assault. She waits at the top of the tower while Max waits at the bottom of the stairs. The killer arrives and stabs Lou to death before proceeding inside, where they attack and wound Max. He manages to play dead while the killer, revealed to be Alan, climbs the stairs and shows himself to his sister.

Mary flashes back to her assault and realizes it was Alan who attacked her, not Berton Mitchell. He tied her to the floor of Mitchell's cottage before biting her, slashing her with a knife, and stuffing a live bat up her vagina, where her memory of flapping wings came from. While she was in a coma in the hospital, her brother managed to place false memories and a psychic hold on the incident by telling all the terrible things he would do to her if she ever spoke of what really happened. All the "poltergeist" incidents were Mary's own powers acting against her due to the hold. Alan also reveals that he was the one that murdered Mitchell's wife and son, and that all the victims Mary recognized were previous girlfriends of his.

Bleeding profusely, Max manages to exit the center and get the attention of arriving cops and Patmore, who mistakes him for the killer and shoots him in the shoulder. Mary, now knowing the truth, uses her psychic powers to make the bats that live in the tower attack Alan. He falls down the stairs and breaks his neck. A few weeks later, she attends Lou's funeral and goes to visit a recovering Max in the hospital. She happily reveals she is not afraid of the dark anymore.
