= Dark Rivers of the Heart =

1994 novel by Dean Koontz

- First edition
- Author: Dean Koontz
- Cover artist: Chip Kidd
- Language: English
- Genre: Suspense, Thriller, Romance
- Publisher: Alfred A. Knopf
- Publication date: 1994
- Publication place: United States
- Media type: Print
- Pages: 487
- ISBN: 0-679-42524-1
- OCLC: 45117870

Dark Rivers of the Heart is a novel by Dean Koontz, published in 1994.

== Plot ==
Spencer Grant is a man with a tainted, yet shadowy past with a lovable dog, Rocky whom he rescued after it was abused. Together they embark on a quest to find a life with a woman named Valerie Keene, whom Roy met in a nightclub. Grant and his dog come back to the club later to find out that the woman is late for work.

When Grant attempts to find her at her home, a SWAT-like team bombards the place, sending Grant into confusion. Grant is now determined to find Valerie, using his skills he learned as both a computer expert and from extensive training in the U.S. Army.

He searches for her in Las Vegas and is pursued by a secret and nameless government agency which is also looking for Valerie. Using vast amounts of diverted government funds and weapons, it can access any information it wants and easily create false identities for its agents. Neither the President nor the Cabinet knows of its existence and many of its support staffers think they are in legitimate agencies fighting drug dealers and terrorists. Spencer gets caught in a storm in the Nevada desert and is injured. He is rescued by Valerie, who has been tracking him with a homing device she hid on his truck after she saw him enter her house. She helps Spencer recover from injuries.

Meanwhile, Roy Miro, a high-ranking official in the agency, is the main antagonist who has been looking for Valerie for months. She is a threat to agency because her husband was the son of its head, and was murdered when he wanted to expose it. Using her excellent computer skills Valerie has kept ahead of the agency but it has been a constant flight. Roy, who enjoys killing anyone he considers imperfect, and the agency use a satellite to find Spencer and Valerie's location in the desert. He and some agents get into a helicopter and corner them in a shopping center.

While the agents are looking for them, Spencer and Valerie take over the agency's helicopter and fly out of Nevada to Colorado. They tie up the crew and steal a car to visit the house where Spencer lived as a child. When he was 14 years old he heard a noise in the night and went out to the barn in the backyard to investigate. Inside the barn he found his father, a famous artist, torturing a woman as part of a "project" in which he has killed many people, including his wife. Spencer found a gun but only wounded his father. His father was later sent to a mental hospital. Roy, expecting Spencer to go there to confront his personal nightmares, takes Spencer's father out of the hospital and flies to the Colorado house to confront Spencer and Valerie.

Spencer's father, who considers Roy to be insane, shoots him in the barn. That only paralyzes Roy. When the cowering Rocky turns and suddenly attacks his father, Spencer uses the opportunity to fatally shoot him. He and Valerie leave the barn and she uses access to a satellite heat beam to kill or scare off the other agents. Ultimately they and other victims of the agency start a new life helping an already organized resistance group against it. Meanwhile, Roy, who they thought dead, is recovering. He and another member of the agency, the daughter of its leader, plan to make her president. The fight continues.

== Critical reception ==
According to Publishers Weekly, "The scientific lore is always riveting and, at times, as when the fleeing man is caught in a flood, the suspense is electrifying; but far too often, the narrative stops dead as characters turn into ventriloquist dummies mouthing the author's views on the erosion of freedom in the U.S. With the Koontz name attached, though, even a mash of blatant polemic and high-powered action like this will no doubt sell like crazy."
