= The Funhouse (novel) =

1980 novelization by Dean Koontz

- First edition
- Author: Dean Koontz (as Owen West)
- Language: English
- Genre: Suspense, mystery, horror, thriller
- Publisher: Jove Books
- Publication date: 1980
- Publication place: United States
- Media type: Print (paperback)
- Pages: 333 pp
- ISBN: 0-425-14248-5
- OCLC: 30373917
- Preceded by: The Key to Midnight
- Followed by: Whispers

The Funhouse is a 1980 novelization by American author Dean Koontz, based on a Larry Block (aka Lawrence J. Block) screenplay, which was made into the 1981 film The Funhouse, directed by Tobe Hooper. As the film production took longer than expected, the book was released before the film.

Koontz originally published the novel under the pseudonym Owen West.

== Plot synopsis ==
In 1955, Ellen, a young woman tired of being oppressed by her meek father and psychotically religious mother, falls in love with a barker from a traveling carnival named Conrad. Despite her mother's pleas, she runs away with the carnival and marries him. However, it is revealed that Conrad is a Satan worshipper using Ellen to spawn the Antichrist. Stuck at the fair as she cannot go back to her parents, she eventually gives birth to a hideously deformed infant. One stormy night, the demonic baby attacks Ellen. She crushes it to death just as Conrad comes home. Enraged, he beats but does not kill her, stating that he will hunt her down one day and murder her own children. Ellen runs off into the night.

In 1980, a boy impregnates his girlfriend, a girl named Amy. He refuses to raise the child or pay for an abortion. She tearfully runs home to her religious, alcoholic mother, who is revealed to be Ellen. Amy eventually tells her mother that she is pregnant, causing Ellen to strike her. However, she agrees to pay for an abortion and takes her to the doctor, but only to stop Amy from "giving birth to the Antichrist."

Amy's younger brother, Joey, is secretly afraid of Ellen, as she frequently comes into his room late at night, drunkenly ranting about how he may be a demon in disguise. He decides to run away with a traveling fair that is coming to town the following week. The carnival is revealed to be Conrad's. After years of searching, the other carnies try to persuade Conrad that he will never find Ellen, but he refuses to give up. That night, a young couple is lured to the carnival's funhouse where they are disembowelled and partially eaten by Gunther, the demonic, monstrous son that Conrad had with the carnival's fortune teller, Madame Zena. Conrad plans to use Gunther to kill Ellen's children.

Amy visits the diner, where her promiscuous best friend Liz works. Liz says she is going to run away to Las Vegas and become a call girl. She invites Amy to come with her the morning after they go to the carnival. Joey visits the fair during the day and is recognized by Conrad as possibly being Ellen's child. When asked what his mother's name is, Joey is frightened and lies. Conrad is disappointed but lets him go.

After running background checks on the town's residents through a private investigator, Conrad learns that Amy and Joey are Ellen's children. He tells Madame Zena that he plans to lure them to the funhouse and kill them. Horrified, she refuses to help with his scheme, and he strangles her to death.

That night, Amy, Liz, and their dates, Buzz and Richie, go to the carnival. Joey escapes from home and goes to the carnival as well, with the intent of running away with it. He finds Conrad and tells him his desire. Conrad lures him to the funhouse and ties him up, revealing that he knows he lied about his mother.

The group arrive at the funhouse and board the ride. Midway through it, Conrad shuts off the power, stranding the four teens inside. Gunther drags Richie away and tears off his head. The three others attempt to find an exit. Amy arms herself with a knife from a display. Liz runs further into the funhouse, alone, before Gunther finds and dismembers her in the basement.

Conrad appears with Joey on a leash and fatally shoots Buzz with a pistol. Amy manages to keep the knife hidden. She tricks Conrad into thinking that she is approaching Joey to comfort him, before fatally stabbing Conrad in the throat and taking his gun. Amy and Joey descend into the basement, where Gunther attacks. After Amy shoots him, he falls into the funhouse's machinery and is torn apart. The siblings find the exit, and Amy carries Joey out of the funhouse and into the morning light.

== Characters ==
- Ellen Giavanetto Straker Harper - mother of Amy and Joey and ex-wife to Conrad
- Conrad Straker - owner and barker of the carnival funhouse, father of Gunther and Victor, ex-husband to Ellen and Madame Zena
- Amy Harper - Ellen's daughter
- Joey Harper - Amy's younger brother
- Jerry Galloway - Amy's ex-boyfriend, father of Amy's aborted child
- Ghost - carnival employee
- Gunther Twibunt Straker - carnival employee and Conrad's second son
- Paul Harper - Ellen's husband
- Madame Zena Penetsky - carnival fortune teller, ex-wife to Conrad, mother of Gunther
- Liz Duncan - friend of Amy
- Buzz Klemmet - Amy's date to the carnival
- Richie Atterbury - Liz's boyfriend
- Marco the Magnificent - carnival magician
- Victor Martin Straker - Conrad and Ellen's baby
