= Cold Fire (Koontz novel) =

1991 novel by Dean Koontz

- First edition
- Author: Dean Koontz
- Cover artist: Don Brautigam
- Language: English
- Genre: Horror
- Publisher: Putnam
- Publication date: 1991
- Publication place: United States
- Media type: Print
- Pages: 382
- ISBN: 0-399-13579-0
- OCLC: 24851599

Cold Fire is a 1991 horror novel written by the American author Dean Koontz.

== Plot ==
Recently retired teacher Jim Ironheart risks his life to save lives. In Portland he saves a young boy from an oblivious drunk driver in a van. In Boston he rescues a child from an underground explosion. In Houston he disarms a man who was trying to shoot his own wife – and he is not just lucky enough to be in the right place at the right time. He gets “inspirations” and knows he must hurry to wherever prompted. He rushes off to hail a cab or catch a plane, dropping whatever he's doing at the moment, much to the surprise of those around him. He has no idea where these visions come from or why, but he believes that he must be some sort of God-sent guardian angel with a heavenly gift.

Reporter Holly Thorne was in Portland to write a less than exciting piece on a school teacher who has recently published a book of poetry full of poems which Holly finds are pure transcendental garbage – but such is Holly's lot in life. She is a fine writer but is failing at her job because she is filled with too much integrity and compassion to be a good reporter. As she is leaving she witnesses Jim rescuing the child from the drunk driver and felt there was something fishy in Jim's explanations of how he started running for the child before seeing or hearing the van coming. She discovers there have been 12 last-minute rescues reported over the last three months in other newspapers by a mysterious Good Samaritan named Jim with blue eyes.

Holly is intrigued by Jim and his intense but cold blue eyes – eyes which burn with a passionate, cold fire, hence the novel's title.

Holly decides to follow this humble yet elusive savior on his next “mission.” Unbeknownst to Jim, she rapidly follows him to the airport and boards a United Airlines DC-10 plane bound for Chicago. She decides to confront him and learns about Jim's strange but extraordinary powers. Jim tells her that he has been sent by God to save a mother and a child on the plane – he does not know why God has chosen these two in particular, but he does know that they must change seats or they will die in the horrific plane crash about which he has been sent a vision. Holly is struck by Jim's belief that he has some magical power, sent by God no less.

Holly takes a more cynical view on things and decidedly argues how ridiculous such thoughts are. She questions why “God” would choose to let these two people live, and allow 151 other passengers to die, as Jim has foreseen. Surely there are much more worthy people aboard, and why would God even have the plane crash at all? Holly presses Jim to do much more than just tell the couple to move, but that he should warn the pilot and maybe save everyone aboard. Jim initially refuses, and decidedly refuses to question his visions. He tells Holly simply that God sends him, and he only follows the instructions – to do anything beyond that would be to somehow go outside God's will. Who else, he asks, could be sending him visions to save lives precisely at the right time? Holly reasons with him, and convinces him that there is no good reason for Jim (or God) to let anyone die needlessly. The plane, however, is damaged beyond saving and still crashes, but the number of fatalities reduces from 151 to 47.

After the crash, Holly manages to gain Jim's confidence. They are attracted to each other, but Holly cannot help but be curious about Jim's mysterious visions. She decides to discover exactly how, why, and who, just as any reporter would naturally want to know. Yet the more she pries, the stranger things get. Nearly all Jim's childhood memories are completely missing, except that he knows his parents died when he was 9 and he then lived at his grandparents’ ranch. He only knows very vague details about everything from his childhood, and gets angry when Holly questions him. She begins to see that his strange abilities are linked to his childhood and lack of memories from then. She hears him whisper in his sleep continuously for several nights, “There is an Enemy. It is coming. It’ll kill us all. It is relentless.” She and Jim start to have identical terrifying nightmares surrounding the old mill from his grandparents’ ranch, and during one of these “nightmares” they are both completely conscious and experience violence while fighting some eerie force coming at them from the walls and ceiling – needless to say, they are convinced the force behind it all is definitely not God, nor is it benign.

Holly unquestionably decides they must go back to the ranch to find the source of everything, though she is fearful of what they will find. Jim is at first reluctant, but as they near the ranch, he becomes more and more convinced that the being is something wholly great and powerful – something not of this world.

Once inside the windmill's creepy tower room, the alien reveals itself from the adjacent pond, at first through sounds analogous to church bells and then an entrancing display of dancing colors and exploding lights. The being then starts to magically use a pen and paper to make words appear, and later manifests as a voice. It calls itself THE FRIEND who has come to them from ANOTHER WORLD. When asked why, it says, “TO OBSERVE, TO STUDY, TO HELP MANKIND.” Holly asks why, then, it attacked them the previous night, to which THE FRIEND replies that that was the work of its other half: THE ENEMY. When asked about the bells and lights, it says that it does that “FOR DRAMA?” Holly asks why the certain individuals are chosen over others, and THE FRIEND gives replies that one will cure all cancers, one will become a great president, one will become a great spiritual leader, et cetera. While Jim is wholly enthusiastic and pleased, Holly cannot believe the answers, for it does not make any logical sense and the answers seem trite, fantastical and childish to her.

Holly questions THE FRIEND far and deep about Jim while he is out of the room. All the answers continue to be too predictable to believe, and it finally answers her nagging with threats and then, most shockingly, with the words “I,” “MY,” and, “ME.” At that moment, it is discovered that Jim is actually himself the source of both THE FRIEND and THE ENEMY, that it is he who is causing the nightmares and not God or some alien force. After Jim's parents died in horrific circumstances which he witnessed, the 9 year old became obsessed with a book about an alien in a pond next to a windmill – he became so obsessed that the child never grew up until one day an adult-in-body Jim ran away and started a presumably normal life. Holly helps Jim deal with his past and the two begin a new life together.

== Movie adaptation ==
According to Koontz in the afterword of a 2004 paperback reissue, he and an unnamed director developed the book into a screenplay independently. They then took it to various studios to pitch the project. Koontz was dismayed that every executive had the same suggestion - that the fictional aliens in Ironheart's life story become real. The project was never made into a film as they couldn't find anyone to support the script as is and not demand changes.
