= The Servants of Twilight =

1984 novel by Dean Koontz

- First edition
- Author: Dean Koontz
- Original title: Twilight
- Language: English
- Genre: Thriller
- Publisher: Pocket Books
- Publication date: 1984
- Publication place: United States
- Media type: Print (Paperback)
- Pages: 440 pp
- ISBN: 0-671-43267-2
- OCLC: 21372048

The Servants of Twilight is a novel by American suspense writer Dean Koontz, originally released under the pseudonym Leigh Nichols in 1984. Its original title was just Twilight. The book's plot revolves around a single mother being tormented by members of a religious cult whose leader believes the woman's son to be the Antichrist. A film adaptation was released in 1991.

== Plot summary ==
Single parent Christine Scavello and her young son Joey are confronted in a mall parking lot by a madwoman who claims that Joey is the Antichrist. After a distressing attack on the family home results in her dog being decapitated, Christine enlists the help of private detective Charlie Harrison. Harrison traces a van that is following Christine back to one Grace Spivey—a charismatic elderly woman who is the leader of a fanatical religious cult called The Servants Of Twilight.

Christine is provided with bodyguards for her protection; however, it is not long before one of them is killed in an attack by cult members. Christine, Charlie, Joey, and the new dog Chewbacca begin a tiresome cross country journey to escape the deluded members of "The Twilight". It seems that no matter how far they travel or where they go, Spivey's people find them. It is revealed that this is due to Spivey being a psychic who can see into the future, a gift that also plagues her with many sleepless nights.

After several more attacks (including a car bomb and an arson attack) the group tries to escape the growing threat of The Twilight by retreating to Charlie's lodge in the mountains. Here, Charlie finds himself falling in love with Christine, and the two end up sleeping together.

Spivey is certain that Joey is the Antichrist, and continually has visions of the apocalypse where the child is the cause. Rather than considering herself insane or unjust, Spivey sees her need to kill the boy (as well as anyone that may get in her way) as a service to mankind. Her faith is so strong that she is able to enlist the following of many key members of the community, including police officers and a man named Kyle Barlowe - a sociopath Spivey had saved from a life of crime.

The Servants of Twilight eventually track the group to Charlie's mountain lodge. After a chase and more gun fights with heavily armed cult members in a treacherous blizzard, the family finds themselves in a cave in the side of a mountain. They are exhausted, Charlie has suffered a gunshot wound to the shoulder and Joey develops a serious illness, including hives to the face and a very pale complexion, both caused by exposure to the extreme cold.

Kyle Barlowe knows he must finish the job, but finds he does not have the ability to kill a child, even if Grace believed him to be the Antichrist.

The story reaches its climax inside the cave when Spivey and her last standing helper, Kyle Barlowe, begin their descent to kill the child and stop the supposed rise of the Antichrist. Christine has no energy left to fight, and Charlie is barely conscious from his gunshot wound. It all looks very bleak as Grace Spivey raises a gun to Joey's head. Just before she pulls the trigger, however, Spivey is attacked by a barrage of bats who attack her and leave her for dead. The strange behavior of the bats causes Christine to wonder if her son could have caused the attack.

The book closes with the end of the ordeal and with Christine and Charlie in a stable relationship. Charlie's curiosity about Joey grows, as the boy's illness cleared up very quickly and mysteriously. The story ends with Charlie trying to find evidence in the buried remains of the family's original dog. The grave does not hold the remains of Christine's dog but a dog of a different breed, which Charlie finds humorous and concludes that Joey could not be the Antichrist.

== Reception ==
Publishers Weekly called it one of Koontz's better thrillers, although they said a chase sequence at the end goes on too long.

== TV film adaptation ==
The television film adaptation of The Servants of Twilight was made in 1991 after the book became an international best seller. The film starred Jarrett Lennon as Joey, Belinda Bauer as Chris, Bruce Greenwood as Charlie Harrison, and cult-favorite Grace Zabriskie as Grace Spivey, also called Mother Grace, the charismatic leader of a fanatical religious cult known as the Church of the Twilight and was directed by Jeffrey Obrow. The film is currently available on DVD in most countries, including the United States.

The Austin Chronicle wrote: "While not as awful as the last film adaptation of a Dean Koontz novel (the evil Corey Haim vehicle Watchers), Servants is a far cry from what it could have been." Variety said: "This is a better-than-usual film adaptation of a horror novel, eliciting its fair share of chills and shudders [...]"
