= The Face of Fear (film) =

1990 American television film

- Original Movie Poster / Newspaper Print Ad 1990
- Genre: Thriller
- Based on: The Face of Fear by Dean Koontz
- Screenplay by: Dean Koontz; Alan Jay Glueckman
- Directed by: Farhad Mann
- Starring: Pam Dawber; Lee Horsley
- Theme music composer: John Debney
- Country of origin: United States
- Original language: English

Production
- Executive producers: Grant Rosenberg; Lee Rich
- Producer: William Beaudine Jr.
- Cinematography: Peter Mackay
- Editor: M. Edward Salier
- Running time: 120 minutes
- Production companies: Papazian-Hirsch Entertainment; Warner Bros. Television

Original release
- Network: CBS
- Release: September 30, 1990

The Face of Fear is a 1990 American thriller television film directed by Farhad Mann and starring Pam Dawber and Lee Horsley. It is based on the 1977 novel of the same name by Dean Koontz, who also co-wrote the teleplay with Alan Jay Glueckman. It has aired on CBS on September 30, 1990.

== Plot ==
During a snowstorm, a killer traps a former mountain climber who has psychic powers and his fiancee in a New York skyscraper office building. In order to escape, they will have to face impossible odds by rappelling down the outside of the building as if it is a mountain.

Swedish VHS cover. (The English language version is mostly identical.)

== Cast ==
- Pam Dawber as Connie Weaver
- Lee Horsley as Graham Harris
- Bob Balaban as Ira Preduski
- William Sadler as Anthony Prine
- Kevin Conroy as Frank Dwight Bollinger

== Production ==
To create some of the scenes in the movie Pam Dawber had to be suspended from ropes. She had initially expected that most of the rappelling scenes would be filmed by stunt doubles, but found that the cast had to do many of their own stunts. Dawber had chosen to film The Face of Fear as it was different from the roles she was typically offered at the time, which she described as "the nice girl or the mom". Actor Lee Horsley experienced some difficulty while filming, as his character had a phobia of heights and Horsley himself was not. He had to use one of his own phobias, claustrophobia, to evoke the emotions needed for Graham.

Author Dean Koontz was brought on to co-write the script.

== Release ==
The Face of Fear aired on CBS on September 30, 1990.

== Reception ==
The Wisconsin State Journal rated the movie at two stars, writing that "Tension is maintained for the most part and if you have a fear of heights, you'll be in a perpetual sweat for about two-thirds of this TV movie."

Ken Tucker of Entertainment Weekly gave the film a C−, calling it "bland" and "mediocre", saying "a psychic mountain-climber" has "Koontz stretch(es) the limits of credibility", that the "murders are more graphic than anything I’ve seen on TV recently" but that the "constraints of prime-time don’t allow this movie to become truly unsettling."

On the other hand, Empire, who gave it three stars, called it "a gripping TV time-waster", saying it took "the most hackneyed of TV movie premises — a psychic is pursued by the serial killer whose crimes he has been mentally witnessing — and a few leftover bits of the plot of Die Hard" and that it was "surprisingly, well, good" and that "the clichéd characters are given a touch more depth than usual, and there are neat, non-stereotyped supporting performances from cop Bob Balaban and smarmy journalist William Sadler".
