= Lightning (Koontz novel) =

1988 sci-fi novel by Dean Koontz

- First edition
- Author: Dean Koontz
- Language: English
- Genre: Fantasy, science fiction, thriller
- Publisher: G. P. Putnam's Sons
- Publication date: 1988
- Publication place: United States
- Media type: Print
- Pages: 351
- ISBN: 0-399-13319-4
- OCLC: 53023283
- LC Class: CPB Box no. 2116 vol. 2

Lightning is a 1988 thriller novel by American writer Dean Koontz. The novel tells the story of a woman born during a freak lightning storm and the mysterious blond-haired stranger who appears out of nowhere again and again to save her from tragedy.

== Plot ==
As Laura Shane is born in January 1955, during a freak lightning storm, a mysterious blond stranger prevents a drunken doctor from attending to the difficult delivery. Throughout Laura's life, the man reappears several times to save Laura and her family from danger, always preceded by a bolt of lightning. Over the years, Laura begins to think of this man as her guardian angel. The blond man turns out to be Stefan, a German who was involved in secret Nazi time traveling experiments, sending agents to the future to uncover ways to change the outcome of World War II. Stefan had previously arrived in an alternate version of 1984 and had seen the results of allowing the drunk doctor to participate in the delivery. In that timeline Laura became a quadriplegic who, despite her disability, wrote beautiful books of poetry which inspired Stefan to renounce his mission, and travel to difficult parts of her life to change them. However, his superior Kokoschka became suspicious of him and followed him, sending assassins into the future to learn of their path. These four assassins are responsible for all the narrow escapes Laura has experienced throughout her life.

With the aid of modern technology, Stefan prepares to go back to his own time. He makes a jump to see Winston Churchill and convinces him that the institute containing the time machine must be bombed; Churchill agrees. Stefan also makes a trip to Adolf Hitler, to convince the dictator of various threads that must be cleared up, in reality sabotaging the German war effort.

While he is gone, Laura and her son Chris are attacked by more Nazis, as records of a police stop have been discovered. Stefan returns to find Laura and Chris dead. He works around the time limit of the machine by sending Laura a message to save them. Despite this, Chris and Laura still have to battle all four men themselves. Laura kills all four men pursuing them and protects Chris as best she can. In the long months that follow, Laura and Chris are questioned by the police. They soon believe a story of "drug dealers who wanted revenge." Stefan and Laura are reunited and fall in love.

== Publication history ==
Lightning was published by G. P. Putnam's Sons in 1988. A 2003 reprinting includes a new afterword by the author, discussing editorial politics.

== Reception ==
Publishers Weekly wrote: "The reader senses that the author got too caught up in the trick of the lightning, and inadvertently stole the thunder from the rest of this potentially intriguing tale." Kirkus Reviews said: "Shame on Koontz for following up his best chiller yet (the exciting, inspired Watchers) with this erratic popcorn that nearly buries its neat premise [...] under soap operatics more absurd than any purveyed in his earlier novels. Kirkus reviewed a 1988 audiobook version and said: "This is an unsatisfactory abridgment. Even a listener who hasn't read the book will be aware of large gaps of missing information."
