= Dragon Tears =

1993 novel by Dean Koontz

- First edition
- Author: Dean Koontz
- Cover artist: Don Brautigam
- Language: English
- Genre: Thriller, Horror novel
- Publisher: Putnam
- Publication date: 1993
- Publication place: United States
- Media type: Print
- Pages: 377
- ISBN: 0-399-13773-4
- OCLC: 29061094
- LC Class: CPB Box no. 2369 vol. 4

Dragon Tears is a 1993 paranormal/horror novel by the American author Dean Koontz.

== Reception ==
Kirkus Reviews referred to Dragon Tears "an electrifying terrorfest" and Koontz's "silkiest writing yet", noting that the author "hooks us at once [...] and never lets go". Publishers Weekly similarly highlighted how "Koontz romps playfully and skillfully through this grown-up enchantment, dealing out such motifs as a talking dog and taking potshots at recognizable pop culture". They concluded that the novel is "as irresistible (and nutritionally valuable) as a stack of brownies".

Despite such praise, Kirkus Reviews mentioned that "Koontz gets a bit preachy about social decay—but his action never flags in this vise-tight tale".

Publishers Weekly also noted that "the prose may occasionally strike a false note".

Booklist also reviewed the novel.
