= Life Expectancy (novel) =

2004 novel by Dean R. Koontz

- Cover
- Author: Dean Koontz
- Original title: None
- Translator: None
- Illustrator: None
- Cover artist: Tom Hallman
- Language: English
- Series: None
- Genre: Suspense, psychological novel
- Publisher: Bantam Books
- Publication date: 2004
- Publication place: United States
- Media type: Print
- Pages: 496 pp
- ISBN: 0-553-58824-9
- OCLC: 62205787

Life Expectancy is a novel by suspense/horror writer Dean Koontz. The plot centers on five pivotal moments in the life of a self-proclaimed "lummox" named James "Jimmy" Tock.

== Plot summary ==
James Tock was born in Snow County Hospital in Colorado and at the exact moment his grandfather, Josef Tock, a pastry chef, dies of a stroke. Though crippled by a stroke earlier in the week, moments before his death, Josef recovers miraculously to impart on his son Rudy ten cryptic predictions: among them that his grandchild will be named James—but that everyone will call him Jimmy. Josef also predicts five terrible days to come in his grandson's life. Coherent though his bizarre speech may be, Josef Tock does not recover from this event, but expires just as the baby is born.

Earlier in the evening, Rudy Tock made the acquaintance of a strange man, Konrad Beezo. Beezo is a clown for the very circus Tock's pass is for, and is a fitful, spiteful, creepy, chain-smoking individual half in his clown costume. His wife Natalie, a trapeze artist of some renown and born of a good family, is lying in childbirth, says he, and her relatives have virtually disowned her for marrying him. He speaks glowingly of his soon-to-be-born son, who is to be named "Punchinello", and will carry on the fine tradition of clowning. He speaks venomously of his father-in-law, using many colorful epithets.

Tock is only too grateful to leave Beezo. However, the grief for his father's death was short-lived. Beezo, upon learning Natalie died in childbirth, goes insane ranting about her family sending assassins to kill her and begins shooting, killing a doctor and a nurse. Tock, in perhaps the one moment of heroism in his meek baker's life, convinces the mad clown his enemies have left, and momentarily quells his anger.

Jimmy Tock writes the book, a loose autobiography of personal experience, reminisces, and second- or even third-hand accounts of events, transcribing it from a series of tapes on the eve of his fifth and final terrible day. The narrative is given in an often self-deprecating, comically understated manner. However, certain experiences stand out starkly, most noticeably blundering into a harrowing, yet almost surreal, bank robbery by a trio of plastique-wielding crazed history buff clowns led by none other than Punchinello Beezo—in which Jimmy gradually realizes he's falling for a comely fellow hostage and a dangerous game of chicken with a severely disturbed stalker on an icy road the night his wife Lorrie, the former fellow hostage is about to deliver their first child (on the second predicted date). The man after the Tocks is none other than Konrad Beezo himself, looking for retribution for his imprisoned, and accidentally-gelded son. His mad obsession with the family frames both this terrible day and the next predicted day for Beezo desires a male Tock child as his prize, a new son to raise in the fine clown tradition. The lunatic will do whatever he must to collect what he believes due him, including numerous facial reconstructive surgeries to assume new identities and escape the grasp of the law. Jimmy believes that everyone in the world is tenebrously yet inexorably connected to one another, just as his toes were at birth. This phenomenon is often called "Six degrees of separation". Punchinello, who is currently imprisoned, is asked by Jimmy and Lorrie, who aided in his conviction and sentencing, to donate one of his kidneys to help save the life of Annie Tock, the daughter of Jimmy and Lorrie. Punchinello only agrees to the donation in return for multiple favors that are frivolous by comparison to the precious kidney. As the deal is about to be complete, Punchinello asks that Jimmy kills Virgilio Vivacemente as one last favor.

As the prophecies are fulfilled one by one, and he survives each, Jimmy learns many things about himself—as well as Konrad, Natalie, Punchinello, and Konrad's father-in-law, Virgilio Vivacemente, the vain, sadistic patriarch of the acrobatic clan who casts his long shadow over the lives of both the Tocks and the Beezos. Some of Jimmy's revelations are beautiful; others fearsome; still others shake his meek, lumbering pastry chef's life to the foundation and cause him to reflect on the true meaning of syndactyly—as both an ailment and a life's philosophy.
