= Shattered (Koontz novel) =

1973 novel by Dean Koontz

- First edition
- Author: Dean Koontz
- Language: English
- Publisher: Random House
- Publication date: 1973
- Publication place: United States
- Media type: Print (Hardback, Paperback)
- Pages: 183 pp
- ISBN: 0-394-48529-7
- OCLC: 650574
- Dewey Decimal: 813/.5/4
- LC Class: PZ4.K8335 Sh PS3561.O55

Shattered is a 1973 novel by Dean Koontz; it was previously published for Random House under his pseudonym, K.R. Dwyer. The Berkeley edition was published in February 1985, the second printing was in June 1985, and the third printing was in November 1985.

For the 1985 printing, the author's name is given as "Dean R. Koontz."

== Plot summary ==
Artist Alex Doyle and his new family, bride Courtney and her 11-year-old brother Colin, are moving from Philadelphia to San Francisco. Courtney's flying out ahead to get the house set up. Alex and Colin are driving there in Alex's new Ford Thunderbird. The cross-country trip starts out as a bonding experience, but their car is being tailed by a van; a van driven by a psychopath intent on terrorizing them.
