= Midnight (Koontz novel) =

1989 novel by Dean Koontz

- First edition
- Author: Dean Koontz
- Cover artist: Don Brautigam
- Language: English
- Genre: Horror
- Publisher: G. P. Putnam's Sons
- Publication date: 1989
- Publication place: United States
- Media type: Print
- Pages: 383
- ISBN: 0-399-13390-9
- OCLC: 20672877

Midnight is a horror novel by American writer Dean Koontz. It was published in 1989. The book is a cross-genre novel. It includes aspects of suspense, science fiction, love story, and horror.

== Overview ==
As with many Koontz books, Midnight is divided into parts. Part One: Along the Night Coast, contains chapters one through fifty-seven. Part Two: Daybreak in Hades, contains thirty-seven chapters, but is similar to Part One in that it begins with its own 'Chapter One'. Part Three: The Night Belongs To Them, follows suit, begins with its own Chapter One, and has forty-one chapters.

Midnight was Dean Koontz's first No. 1 hardcover on the New York Times bestseller list.

Midnight includes a mixture of plots from the 1950s film Invasion of the Body Snatchers and H.G. Wells' tale The Island of Dr. Moreau. Koontz mentions both of these later in the novel.

== Plot summary ==
Janice Capshaw is pursued and killed by a pack of mysterious, nightmarish beasts while on a nighttime jog along the beach of her northern California home of Moonlight Cove. Sam Booker, an undercover FBI agent, arrives in Moonlight Cove to investigate the recent rash of suspicious deaths, including that of Capshaw. Tessa Jane Lockland, sister of Capshaw, also arrives in Moonlight Cove to investigate her sister's death.

Chrissie Foster, an eleven-year-old girl who lives on a farm north of town, accidentally witnesses her parents in a physically altered state - part-human and part-beast - and is forced to flee for her life. She heads towards town to seek help.

Sam, Tessa and Chrissie are all separately hunted by the mysterious beasts. Sam and Tessa meet by chance in a laundromat where they have both retreated after being stalked by the beasts. Mistrustful of one another at first, they realize that to survive they must work together.

Sam discovers that Thomas Shaddack, a brilliant computer scientist, is converting the citizens of Moonlight Cove into something unexplained. Sam also learns that the local police are aiding Shaddack in the conversions and that their state-of-the-art computer system, given to them by Shaddack’s company, is unnecessarily sophisticated for the needs of a small town police force.

Because of a letter sent to the FBI by Moonlight Cove resident, Harry Talbot, offering information about the recent disturbing events, Sam and Tessa decide to go to Harry at his place of residence. Harry is a Vietnam vet, who was badly injured in the war and now uses a wheelchair. He has not yet been ‘converted’. Because he spends most of his time watching the people of Moonlight Cove through his telescope, Harry has learned a great deal about what is going on and also learns that the local police are involved.

Chrissie also ends up at Harry Talbot’s, after her attempt to approach the local church ends with her having to evade the beasts again, and she makes the reasoned guess that Harry may be a safe person to approach.

Together, the four protagonists piece together more fully the story behind the happenings of Moonlight Cove. Thomas Shaddack's company, New Wave Technology, has created an injectable solution of microcomputers called microspheres that, when administered, converts a human into a super-human member of the New People who are no longer susceptible to illness, injury, fatigue, or emotion. Conversion has an unforeseen side-effect: stripped of the capacity to feel any human emotion but fear, life becomes intolerably meaningless, and most of the newly converted townspeople regress irresistibly into a beast state, concerned only with hunting, killing, and consuming prey.

As events unfold, Shaddack descends further into madness. He refuses to acknowledge that his plans have gone terribly wrong and that the conversions should be stopped. Seeing that nothing can stop the town's descent into chaos, the Chief of Police, Loman Watkins, vows to kill Shaddack, which will also kill every converted person in the community; Shaddack wears a telemetry device that monitors his heartbeat, and if his heart stops, a supercomputer at New Wave Technology headquarters will transmit a fatal microwave frequency to the New People's microspheres.

The final showdown takes place at the local high school, after Sam heads there to use a school computer terminal to get a warning to the outside world and request assistance, which alerts both Shaddack and Watkins. Shaddack is killed in the final confrontation, triggering the deaths of almost all the New People. Sam, Tessa and Chrissie survive and the FBI arrive with the military to clean up the mess.

== Characters ==
- Sam Booker: a forty-two year old FBI agent, who has lost his wife and is now a single parent to a teenager, Scott.
- Tessa Jane Lockland: a thirty-three year old documentary film maker and the sister of Janice Capshaw, an early victim of Shaddack's regressive citizens.
- Chrissie Foster: an 11-year-old girl who escapes from her parents after they try to convert her to one of Shaddack's regressive citizens.
- Loman Watkins: Chief of Police for Moonlight Cove. A good police officer who cares about the well-being of his community. He is one of the first people converted by Shaddack, but he is converted without his consent.
- Thomas Shaddack: the primary antagonist. He is a sociopath with no remorse. He has no ability to understand, or care about, the lives of others. He became a murderer at a very young age when he killed both of his parents. He sees his purpose in life as nothing less than the complete subjugation of the human race which would enable him to do anything and everything that his twisted mind desires.
- Harry Talbot: a disabled Vietnam veteran who observes the changes in the town through his telescope and alerts the FBI to the problems.
- Moose: Harry Talbot's intelligent service dog.
- Janice Capshaw: a late night exercise enthusiast and the widow of a Lutheran minister. She is an early victim of Shaddack's regressive citizens. Her sister Tessa, or T.J., comes to town to investigate her death.
- Mike Peyser: a regressive citizen.
- Neil Penniworth: becomes a technological regressive (one with the computer) believes that the technological regressive is the next evolution of the new people.

== Film adaptation ==
In June 1993, it was reported that producers Mace Neufeld and Robert Rehme had acquired the rights to Midnight to develop as a feature film to be directed by Stuart Gordon.
