= Strange Highways (short story collection) =

Book by Dean Koontz

- First (limited) edition
- Author: Dean Koontz
- Cover artist: Phil Parks
- Language: English
- Genre: Horror, suspense
- Publisher: Cemetery Dance Publications, Warner
- Publication date: 1995
- Publication place: United States
- Media type: Print (hardback & paperback)

Strange Highways is a collection of 12 short stories and two novels by American author Dean Koontz, released in May 1995. Four of the stories are revised from their originals. A British edition of the book (without the novella Chase) was previously issued by Headline in April 1995. It was nominated for the Bram Stoker Award for Best Fiction Collection.

Cemetery Dance Publications printed a limited edition hardcover of the book (ISBN 1-881475-15-8). It was slipcased and limited to 750 signed and numbered copies.

== Content ==
- "Strange Highways" (novel): a failed author returns to his hometown after many years to attend his father's funeral, only to find himself suddenly and inexplicably thrust back through time to relive a traumatic event from his past, and possibly to find redemption. In the introduction, Koontz lists the Centralia, Pennsylvania, mine fire as an inspiration for this story.
- "The Black Pumpkin": a twelve-year-old boy tries to stop his sadistic older brother from buying a monstrous-looking pumpkin from a creepy pumpkin carver, but to no avail. That night, the frightening truth about the pumpkin and its carver is revealed.
- "Miss Attila the Hun": A bizarre alien lifeform tries to take over the planet, and the only thing in its way is a schoolteacher known as Miss Atilla the Hun.
- "Down in the Darkness": after a couple buys a new house, the husband discovers a mysterious door that seems to appear and disappear at will. When he goes through it, he discovers a horrifying secret.
- "Ollie's Hands": a young man with extraordinary psychic abilities and his tragic attempt to pursue a relationship with a woman whose life he saves. [Revised version]
- "Snatcher": a loathsome purse snatcher steals a purse from a strange old woman, only to find out too late that there was far more to her (and her purse) than met the eye.
- "Trapped": a woman and her son trying to fend off an attack by giant, mutated rats.
- "Bruno": a private eye meets a "probability cop" from another dimension, and together they hunt down a dangerous alien. [Revised version]
- "We Three": three siblings with special powers eliminate the rest of mankind, thinking that they're the "new race", but soon one of them is pregnant with a creature even more powerful who just might eliminate them. [Revised version]
- "Hardshell": a wounded cop stalks a killer through an abandoned warehouse, but there's more to this seemingly stereotypical situation than meets the eye.
- "Kittens": the first short story Koontz ever sold. An abused girl learns the horrible truth about God "taking her kittens to Heaven", and she devises an even more horrible revenge. [Revised version]
- "The Night of the Storm": a group of intelligent robots go on a hunting trip in the woods, where they learn that the myth of "human beings" may not be a myth after all.
- "Twilight of the Dawn": a devout atheist who finds his lack of faith challenged in the wake of his son's painful death from cancer.
- "Chase" (novella): A Vietnam war hero goes on the hunt for a murderous criminal.
