= Strangers (Koontz novel) =

1986 novel written by Dean Koontz

- First edition
- Author: Dean Koontz
- Language: English
- Genre: Science fiction
- Publisher: Putnam
- Publication date: 1986
- Publication place: United States
- Media type: Print
- Pages: 526
- ISBN: 0-399-13143-4
- OCLC: 50819625
- LC Class: CPB Box no. 2097 vol. 17

Strangers is a horror novel written by Dean Koontz, released in 1986.

== Plot ==
A group of people are brought together by their different and equally strange maladies. Dominick has somnambulism, Ginger has unexplained lapses into a fugue state, Father Brendan loses his faith and later gains a miraculous "gift", and Ernie has nyctophobia.

Dominick receives Polaroids that lead him to the Tranquility Motel, situated in the middle of the Nevada "high-desert", thirty miles west of Elko. Together with Ned and Sandy, who run the restaurant next door to the motel, they discover that their true memories from the summer of the previous year may have been suppressed.

Later Ginger, Jorja, and the other people who stayed at the Tranquility Motel are contacted and invited to join the group. Ginger shares that their memories are suppressed by Azrael Blocks, a means of brainwashing induced through drugs and hypnosis. She received hypnosis as a treatment to uncover a cause of her malady.

The Tranquility "community" are unaware that those behind the suppression are watching them. They are joined by Jack Twist (who was led to the Tranquility Motel by a series of postcards placed there by an insider). The group finally comes up with a strategy to uncover the government secret that has been hidden at the Thunder Hill Depository in the hills.

== Primary characters ==
- Dominick Corvaisis, author
- Ginger Weiss, surgeon
- Ernie Block, U.S.M.C. (ret.), and his wife, Faye Block
- Brendan Cronin, priest and curate
- Jack Twist, former Army Ranger and P.O.W., professional thief
- Jorja Monatella, formerly Rykoff, Las Vegas casino cocktail waitress
- Alan Rykoff, Jorja's estranged husband
- Marcie Rykoff, their young daughter
- Sandy Sarver, diner waitress, and her husband, Ned Sarver, short-order cook
- Leland Falkirk, U.S. Army Colonel
- Parker Faine, artist
- Stefan Wycazik, parish priest
- Miles Bennell, scientist
- Bob Alvarado, U.S. Army General

== Adaptation ==
In 2018, it was announced that an adaptation of Strangers is in development at Fox for a one hour drama created by Criminal Minds creator Jeff Davis. The project is a co-production between Fox and Sony Pictures Television.
