= Mr. Murder (novel) =

1993 novel by Dean Koontz

- First edition
- Author: Dean Koontz
- Language: English
- Genre: Horror
- Publisher: G. P. Putnam's Sons
- Publication date: 1993
- Publication place: United States
- Media type: Print
- Pages: 415
- ISBN: 0-399-13899-4
- OCLC: 31423592

Mr. Murder is a horror novel by the best-selling author Dean Koontz, released in 1993.

== Plot ==
Bestselling mystery writer Marty Stillwater was recording himself one day when he realized that he was saying "I need..." repeatedly. When he rewound the recording he found that he had been unconsciously repeating "I need" for over 7 minutes. Marty was tense that whole day, when he put the kids to bed though he calmed down considerably and was finally consoled.

Meanwhile, the Killer is roaming the streets before his job. He goes into a bar and leaves with a prostitute to go to a motel. He has sex with her and then murders her because she cannot assuage his frustration. He proceeds to kill his targets and returns to his hotel. That night, still restless, he is drawn for some reason towards Topeka. Suddenly, he starts saying:

"I need... to be... I need to be... I need to be..." As the suburbs and finally the dark prairie flash past on both sides, excitement builds steadily in him. He trembles on the brink of an insight that, he senses, will change his life. "I need to be... to be... I need to be someone." At once he understands the meaning of what he has said. By "to be someone," he does not mean what another man might intend to say with those same three words; he does not mean that he needs to be someone famous or rich or important. Just someone. Someone with a real name. Just an ordinary Joe, as they used to say in the movies of the forties.

— Mr. Murder page 48-49

The Killer is attracted like a magnet by some force he doesn't understand to the Stillwater residence. On his way he kills several people; an old couple for a set of clothes and a gas station clerk to steal food and money. When he breaks into the Stillwater house he sees a picture of Marty and believes it to be himself. He observes books authored by Marty and decides they are his. He sees the pictures of the daughters Emily and Charlotte and Marty's wife Paige, he then decides he wants to be the father and husband. He attempts to write a book but cannot and in his frustration he destroys the computer.

Marty was quite upset about his fugues (a break in one's memory) and so went to see a doctor. The doctor attributed it to stress.

When Marty comes home he finds things misplaced and his computer smashed. The Other then enters and accuses him of being an impostor. He menaces Marty who shoots him twice in the chest, but the Other is unfazed. The fight catapults them over the banisters leaving the Other seriously injured but he gets away. Marty's family returns home, and Marty sends them to their neighbour's house. Soon after, the police arrive. Cyrus Lowbock, the detective, interrogates Marty and doesn't believe his story, insinuating it is a publicity stunt. Marty and his wife refuse to cooperate and the police leave.

The Other's body has rapidly recovered from his injuries but the effort leaves him ravenous. After consuming massive amounts of food he returns to get Paige and the girls back from Marty who he believes has stolen them. He manages to get the daughters from the neighbour's house, but Marty sees him and gives chase. The car crashes and the girls escape but the Killer flees again.

Drew Oslett and Karl Clocker, two operatives of a clandestine government agency are sent to retrieve the Killer (referred to as "Alfie") They discover the bodies of the two seniors and Alfie's tracking device. A message from their agency leads them toward the People magazine article on Marty Stillwater and they discover his connection with the Killer. They meet a contact who might help them find Alfie. To maintain their cover they decide the Stillwaters have to be terminated to look like a murder/suicide and Alfie has to be brought in.

Meanwhile, the Stillwaters flee to a cabin in Mammoth Lakes and prepare to defend themselves against attack by The Other. Paige hides under a rock to ambush The Other, but unpredictably he rams his car through the cabin. The Stillwaters then flee to an abandoned church. Here Marty is shot and Paige and the girls are trapped. As The Other prepares to kill them, Drew and Karl track him down. Drew kills The Other and is then killed by Karl who has turned against the agency. He rescues the Stillwaters, provides them with new identities, a new home and evidence to bring the agency down. He explains that cloning and genetic engineering were used to create a breed of elite assassins, with Marty's tissue samples accidentally becoming involved in creating Alfie. After a few months Marty mails the evidence to the authorities from an anonymous name and the Stillwaters begin their new lives.

== Characters ==
Marty Stillwater - Marty is a mystery novelist. His wife is Paige and they have two daughters: Emily and Charlotte.

Paige Stillwater - Paige is Marty's wife and is a counselor.

Charlotte Stillwater - First daughter of Marty and Paige.

Emily Stillwater - Second daughter of Marty and Paige.

The Killer - A genetically engineered clone of Marty that is named Alfie. He was created by mistake. Has been trained in many forms of combat and is experienced in "real world" combat missions.

Drew Oslett - Alfie's handler. He is paired with Karl Clocker, whom he despises.

Karl Clocker - Karl is paired with Drew.

Cyrus Lowbock - Lowbock is a cynical detective who was in charge of the investigation of Marty's attack. He didn't believe the story Marty told him, which caused Marty and Paige to kick him out of the house.

== Adaptations ==
Koontz sold the film rights to Mr. Murder to Savoy Pictures after the book's publication. The adaptation was initially scheduled to be a big budget theatrical feature in 1996 starring Bruce Willis as Marty Stillwater and to be directed by Uli Edel. However, this version never came into fruition.

With the feature film unable to get off the ground, the rights were sold to a different production company that developed the project as a miniseries on a much smaller budget. This adaptation was directed by Dick Lowry from a teleplay by Stephen Tolkin. The cast included Stephen Baldwin as Marty Stillwater, Julie Warner as Paige Stillwater, Thomas Haden Church as Drew Oslett Jr., and James Coburn as Drew Oslett Sr., a character not in the book. It was broadcast in New Zealand on September 21, 1998, and was later broadcast in the United States on ABC on April 26 and April 29, 1999.
