= The Face of Fear (novel) =

1977 novel by Dean Koontz

- First edition
- Author: Dean Koontz (as Brian Coffey)
- Language: English
- Genre: Suspense, horror
- Publisher: Bobbs-Merrill Company
- Publication date: 1977
- Publication place: United States
- Media type: Print (Hardcover)
- Pages: 232
- ISBN: 0-672-52312-4
- OCLC: 22779029

The Face of Fear is a suspense-horror novel by American writer Dean Koontz, first published in 1977. It was originally released under the pseudonym Brian Coffey.

== Plot summary ==
Graham Harris was once one of the world's foremost mountain climbers, until a fall five years earlier left him with a lame leg, a fear of heights...and a frightening psychic ability in which he can see murders as they are happening. Harris lives in New York City, where a murderous madman known as the Butcher has been mutilating young women. While he is giving an interview on live television one night, Graham senses the Butcher claiming another victim. When the madman realizes that Graham poses a threat to him he formulates a plan to kill the clairvoyant. While working late one night in his office building, Graham senses that the Butcher is coming to his floor aboard an elevator. With his girlfriend Connie at his side, Graham begins a long night of playing hide and seek to try to avoid the psychopath's grip, during which, Connie and Graham gradually run out of places to hide, and are eventually faced with a horrific ultimatum: either stay and take their chances with the Butcher, or scale the face of the building in the midst of a blizzard. Graham is eventually talked into facing his fear with the latter, with the Butcher shooting at them all the while. Eventually, the Butcher is violently killed in an incident involving a piece of machinery. Graham and Connie escape, but they soon meet up with Anthony Prine, who is the other half of the Butcher. (It is revealed that he and Bollinger had a quasi-Leopold and Loeb relationship.) Prine confronts them, but he is wounded by detective Ira Preduski. In the epilogue, it is revealed that Connie and Graham are engaged.

== Major characters ==
=== Graham Harris ===
Graham has blue eyes, is thirty-eight years old, stands five feet eleven inches tall, and has "thick reddish-blond hair". He feels affection for Connie Davis, his girlfriend. His father, a successful publisher, died when Graham was a year old, and left him a trust fund. Graham took his stepfather (Evan Harris)'s last name when his mother, a cocktail waitress, was married to the man. Five years before the events of the book, Graham fell on Mount Everest, and his injuries included sixteen broken bones and internal injuries: up to current times, he has made three more attempts to climb Everest and has failed each time. He is the publisher of two mountain climbing magazines. Graham is a clairvoyant who has been helping the police, particularly Detective Ira Preduski, in trying to find the Butcher: Graham feels that he himself has "a responsibility to develop and interpret his psychic talent". While being interviewed on Manhattan at Midnight by Anthony Prine, a two-hour interview programme, Graham senses that Edna Mowry, the Butcher's tenth victim, is being killed, and then senses that she has been killed. The killer realises that Graham knows to much, and might be able to identify him. He murders security guards and the few other people still working in the "Bowerton Building", a multi storey structure which houses Graham's office, but Graham senses the killer's presence. The armed killer pursues Graham and Connie through the Bowerton; they have no weapons, and their attempts to escape include sometimes scaling the outer walls of the building, before they finally escape the clutches of Frank Bollinger. After Bollinger is killed, they head back to Graham's house, where they are confronted by Ira Preduski and Anthony Prine (who, none of them know, is one half of the Butcher), surviving Prine's assault mostly due to Preduski shooting Prine in self-defense. By the end of the story, he and Connie have decided to get married.

=== Connie Davis ===
Connie is Graham Harris's girlfriend and the owner of an antique shop. Thirty-four years old and a brunette, Connie has lived with Graham for eighteen months. "To Connie, there was but one obscenity, and that was the grave". Connie believes that helping and healing Graham is the most important thing in her life, and loves him more than she has anyone else, ever. "She was his (Graham's) doctor and nurse as well as his lover". Connie is chased along with Graham throughout the "Bowerton Building", escaping and fleeing with Graham to his house. Her life is likely saved by Detective Preduski shooting Anthony Prine in self-defense. By the end of the story, she and Graham have decided to get married.

=== Ira Preduski ===
Ira is a Manhattan homicide Detective, paired up with Detective Daniel Mulligan. He has brown eyes and a pale complexion, and described as being "quick to take blame for everything". He lived in the south until he was four years old, although his parents weren't born there, and then moved north with his parents. According to Ira himself, he hasn't found "the right woman". He is present at the tenth and eleventh Butcher murders. When Dr. Enderby suggests to him at the crime scene of Sarah Piper that the Butcher is two people and they are working together, he disagrees with Enderby, saying "I can't see psychopaths working together so smoothly and effectively". Anthony Prine is wounded at Graham Harris's house by Ira, who is shooting in self-defense, likely saving the life of Graham Harris. Ira seems to know at the end of the novel that Graham and Connie plan on getting married.

=== Anthony Prine ===
The host of Manhattan at Midnight, Prine also forms one-half of the Butcher. Prine murders Sarah Piper, the eleventh victim of the Butcher. He plans to cause chaos between all races and people in New York City, and then rise to power from the destruction. Born Billy James Plover and with a southern accent, he has mastered the ability to speak with or without a southern accent. Nine months after meeting Frank Bollinger, he felt he knew Frank better than he knew any other human being, ever. Anthony calls Charles Manson "a two-bit con man, a cheap sleazy hood". Waiting outside the "Bowerton Building" for Frank, he leaves after the time limit he and Frank agreed on passes, and drives by the building later, seeing the cops, and seemingly knowing what happened to Frank. Anthony goes to Graham's house, waits for him to come in, and shoots Graham in the back. He is wounded by Ira Preduski at the end of the book.

=== Franklin Dwight Bollinger ===
Frank represents the second half of the Butcher, assumed to be a detective, and is thirty-seven years old. He describes himself as an "admirer of William Blake's poetry", and after his first meeting with Anthony Prine he felt that they were twins. His doctor has told him that he is likely to die of hypertension (Frank exhibits extreme nervous tension). Frank kills the tenth victim of the Butcher, Edna Mowry. He chases Graham and Connie through the "Bowerton Building", and is killed when a road grader's driver chases Frank with the machine in self-defense. Frank runs away, but slips on ice and falls: the driver of the road grader is unable to stop the machine in time, and Frank is hit by the road grader's plow..... ..

== Minor characters ==
First nine victims of the Butcher - The victims' (all women) professions: housewife, lawyer, sales clerk, model, two school-teachers, and three secretaries. Although all are raped before being killed, Dr. Enderby says they are only raped "To impress us" and also says "Sex isn't the motivating factor": perhaps supporting his opinion is the fact that there is no evidence of anal, genitalia, or breast mutilation (and there is also no evidence of lip or tongue mutilation, either).

Edna Mowry - Edna has green eyes. She works at the Rhinestone Palace as a stripper. Edna is the tenth victim of the Butcher (she is killed by Frank Bollinger), and is found having been stabbed many times (one a throat wound), with "a [plug] of flesh" having been cut out of her stomach, and is found nude at the crime scene.

Sarah Piper - The eleventh victim of the Butcher (Anthony Prine her killer), Sarah is a stripper at the Rhinestone Palace alongside Edna Mowry, who she says "was my best friend. She is described as a "well-built blond", and mentions to Graham Harris that "I do some light hooking...". Ira describes her as having a "soft Georgia accent". Sarah also says about Edna, "I was her only friend".

Dr. Andrew Enderby - He is the medical examiner at Sarah Piper's crime scene. In his fifties with thick hair, brown eyes, and a salt-and-pepper mustache, he suggests (correctly) to Ira Preduski that the Butcher is two people working together to commit the murders.

Billy- Frank's partner in killing women who fakes the big meal after the killing was done. Frank Bollinger also calls him "Dwight".

== Television film adaptation ==
The story was adapted into a 2-hour TV movie of the same name that aired on CBS Sunday September 30, 1990. It starred Lee Horsley as Graham Harris, Pam Dawber as Connie Weaver, Kevin Conroy as the Butcher, Bob Balaban, and William Sadler. It was directed by Farhad Mann, with a teleplay by Dean Koontz and Alan Jay Glueckman.
