= Dean Koontz =

American writer and screenwriter (born 1945)

- Born: Dean Ray Koontz; July 9, 1945 (age 81); Everett, Pennsylvania, United States
- Education: Shippensburg State College (BA)
- Occupations: Novelist; short story writer; screenwriter; poet
- Spouse: Gerda Ann Cerra (m. 1966)
- Writing career
- Pen name: Aaron Wolfe; Brian Coffey; David Axton; Deanna Dwyer; John Hill; K.R. Dwyer; Leigh Nichols; Anthony North; Owen West; Richard Paige
- Genres: Suspense; horror fiction; science fiction; thriller; fantasy
- Notable works: Odd Thomas; Demon Seed; Watchers; Hideaway; Intensity; Phantoms; The Face of Fear; Lightning
- Website: www.deankoontz.com

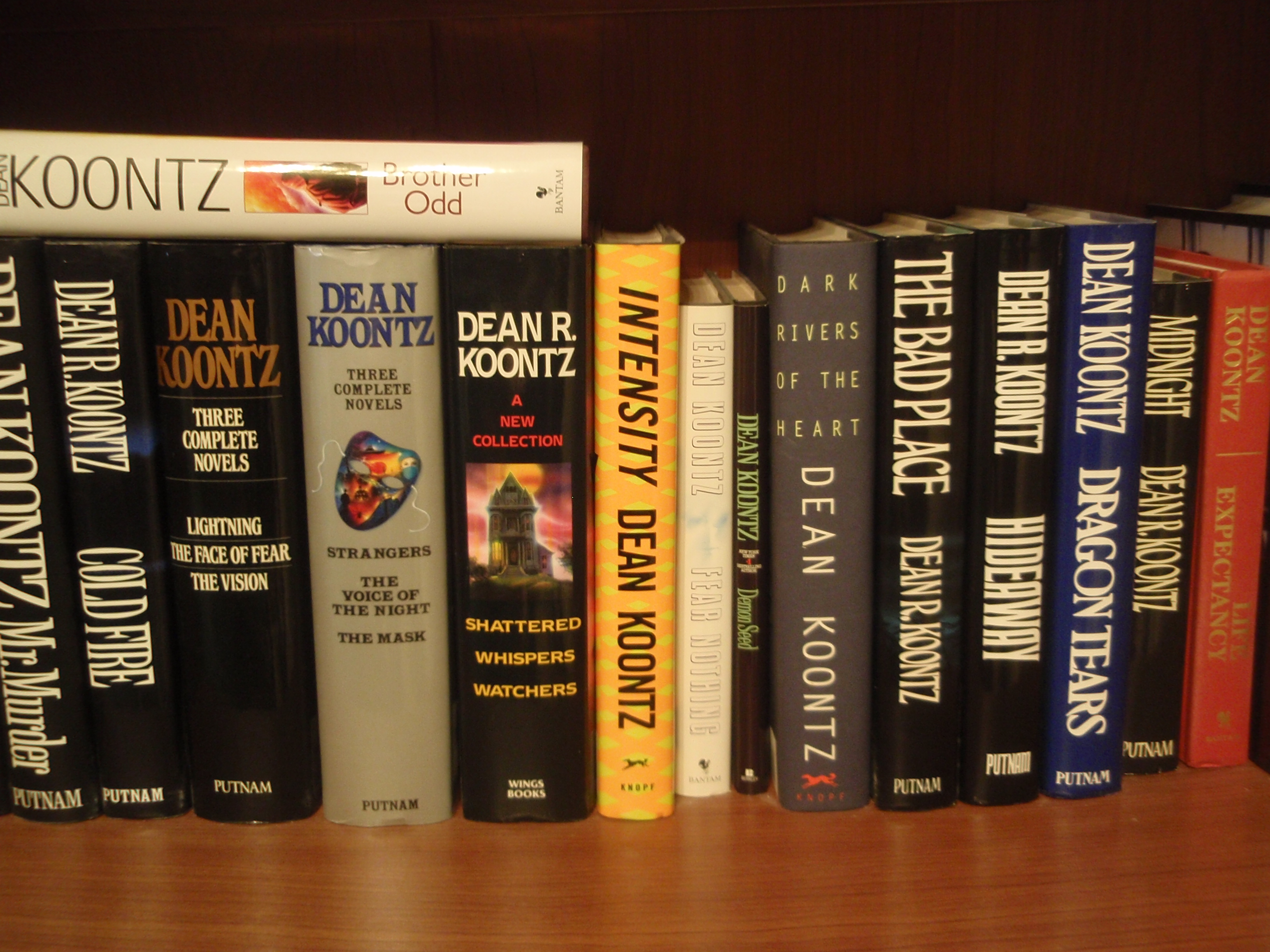
A collection of Dean Koontz books

Dean Ray Koontz (born July 9, 1945) is an American author. His novels are billed as suspense thrillers, but frequently incorporate elements of horror, fantasy, science fiction, mystery, and satire. Many of his books have appeared on The New York Times Best Seller list, with fourteen hardcovers and sixteen paperbacks reaching the number-one position. Koontz wrote under a number of pen names earlier in his career, including "David Axton", "Deanna Dwyer", "K. R. Dwyer", "Leigh Nichols", "Brian Coffey" and "Joe Cocker". He has published over 105 novels and a number of novellas and collections of short stories, and has sold over 500 million copies of his work. He has been acknowledged as "America's most popular suspense novelist" by Rolling Stone and as one of today's most celebrated and successful writers.

== Early life ==
Koontz was born on July 9, 1945, in Everett, Pennsylvania, the son of Florence (née Logue) and Raymond Koontz. He has said that he was regularly beaten and abused by his alcoholic father, which influenced his later writing, as also did the courage of his physically diminutive mother in standing up to her husband. He was raised in Bedford, Pennsylvania and graduated from Bedford High School in 1963. While attending Shippensburg State College, Koontz married his high school girlfriend Gerda Ann Cerra in 1966.

In his senior year of college he won a fiction competition sponsored by Atlantic Monthly magazine. After graduation in 1967, he went to work as an English teacher at Mechanicsburg High School in Mechanicsburg, Pennsylvania. In the 1960s, Koontz worked for the Appalachian Poverty Program, a federally funded initiative designed to help poor children. In a 1996 interview with Reason magazine, he said that while the program sounded "very noble and wonderful, ... [i]n reality, it was a dumping ground for violent children ... and most of the funding ended up 'disappearing somewhere.'" This experience greatly shaped Koontz's political outlook. In his book, The Dean Koontz Companion, he recalled that he

... realized that most of these programs are not meant to help anyone, merely to control people and make them dependent. I was forced to reconsider everything I'd once believed. I developed a profound distrust of government regardless of the philosophy of the people in power. I remained a liberal on civil-rights issues, became a conservative on defense, and a semi-libertarian on all other matters.

== Career ==
In his spare time Koontz wrote his first novel, Star Quest, which was published in 1968. Koontz went on to write over a dozen science fiction novels. Seeing the Catholic faith as a contrast to the chaos in his family, Koontz converted in college because faith provided existential answers for life; he admired Catholicism's "intellectual rigor", saying it permitted a view of life that saw mystery and wonder in all things. He says he sees Catholicism as English writer and Catholic convert G. K. Chesterton did: that it encourages a "joy about the gift of life". Koontz says that spirituality has always been part of his books, as are grace and our struggle as fallen souls, but he "never get[s] on a soapbox".

In the 1970s Koontz began writing suspense and horror fiction, both under his own name and several pseudonyms, sometimes publishing up to eight books a year. Koontz has stated that he began using pen names after several editors convinced him that authors who switched back and forth between different genres invariably fell victim to "negative crossover" (alienating established fans and simultaneously failing to pick up any new ones). Known pseudonyms used by Koontz during his career include Deanna Dwyer, K. R. Dwyer, Aaron Wolfe, David Axton, Brian Coffey, John Hill, Leigh Nichols, Owen West, Richard Paige, and Anthony North. As Brian Coffey, he wrote the "Mike Tucker" trilogy (Blood Risk, Surrounded, Wall of Masks) in acknowledged tribute to the Parker novels of Richard Stark (Donald E. Westlake). Many of Koontz's pseudonymous novels are now available under his real name. Many others remain suppressed by Koontz, who bought back the rights to ensure they could not be republished; he has, on occasion, said that he might revise some for republication, but only three have appeared — Demon Seed and Invasion were both heavily rewritten before they were republished, and Prison of Ice had certain sections bowdlerised.

After writing full-time for more than 10 years, Koontz had his acknowledged breakthrough novel with Whispers, published in 1980. The two books before that, The Key to Midnight and The Funhouse, also sold over a million copies, but were written under pen names. His first bestseller was Demon Seed, the sales of which picked up after the release of the film of the same name in 1977, and sold over two million copies in one year. His first hardcover bestseller, which finally promised some financial stability and lifted him out of the midlist hit-and-miss range, was his book Strangers. Since then, 12 hardcovers and 14 paperbacks written by Koontz have reached number one on The New York Times Best Seller list.

Bestselling science fiction writer Brian Herbert has stated, "I even went through a phase where I read everything that Dean Koontz wrote, and in the process I learned a lot about characterization and building suspense."

In 1997 psychologist Katherine Ramsland published an extensive biography of Koontz based on interviews with his family and him. This "psychobiography" (as Ramsland called it) often showed the conception of Koontz's characters and plots from events in his own life.

Early author photos on the back of many of his novels show a balding Koontz with a mustache. After Koontz underwent hair transplantation surgery in the late 1990s, his subsequent books have featured a new, clean-shaven appearance with a fuller head of hair. Koontz explained the change by claiming that he was tired of looking like G. Gordon Liddy.

Many of his novels are set in and around Orange County, California. As of 2006, he has lived there with his wife, Gerda, in Newport Coast, California, behind the gates of Pelican Hills. In 2008, he was the world's sixth-most highly paid author, tied with John Grisham, at $25 million annually.

In 2019 Koontz began publishing with Amazon Publishing. At the time of the announcement, Koontz was one of the company's most notable signings.

== Pet dogs ==
One of Koontz's pen names was inspired by his dog, Trixie Koontz, a Golden Retriever, shown in many of his book-jacket photos. Trixie originally was a service dog with Canine Companions for Independence (CCI), a charitable organization that provides service dogs for people with disabilities. Trixie was a gift from CCI in gratitude of Koontz's substantial donations, totaling $2.5 million between 1991 and 2004. Koontz was taken with the charity while he was researching his novel Midnight, a book which included a CCI-trained dog, a black Labrador Retriever, named Moose.

In 2004 Koontz wrote and edited Life Is Good: Lessons in Joyful Living in her name, and in 2005, Koontz wrote a second book credited to Trixie, Christmas Is Good. Both books are written from a supposed canine perspective on the joys of life. The royalty payments of the books were donated to CCI. In 2007, Trixie contracted terminal cancer that created a tumor in her heart. The Koontzes had her euthanized outside their family home on June 30. After Trixie's death, Koontz has continued writing on his website under the name "TOTOS", standing for "Trixie on the Other Side". Trixie is widely thought to have been his inspiration for his November 2007 book, The Darkest Evening of the Year, about a woman who runs a Golden Retriever rescue home, and who rescues a "special" dog, named Nickie, which eventually saves her life. In August 2009, Koontz published A Big Little Life, a memoir of his life with Trixie.

In October 2008 Koontz revealed that he had adopted a new dog, Anna. Eventually, he learned that Anna was the grandniece of Trixie. Anna died on May 22, 2016. Koontz then adopted a new dog, Elsa, on July 11, 2016.

== Disputed authorship ==
A number of letters, articles, and novels were ostensibly written by Koontz during the 1960s and 1970s, but he has stated he did not write them. These include 30 erotic novels, allegedly written together by Koontz and his wife Gerda, including books such as Thirteen and Ready!, Swappers Convention, and Hung, the last one published under the name "Leonard Chris". They also include contributions to the fanzines Energumen and BeABohema in the late 1960s and early 1970s, including articles that mention the erotic novels, such as a movie column called "Way Station" in BeABohema.

Koontz wrote in How to Write Best Selling Fiction, a much revised and updated version of 'Writing Popular Fiction' (1972), "During my first six years as a full-time novelist ... I wrote a lot of ephemeral stuff; anything that would pay some bills ... I did Gothic romance novels under a pen-name ... Like many writers, I did some pornography too, and a variety of other things, none of which required me to commit my heart or my soul to the task. (This is not to say I didn't bother to do a good job; on the contrary, I never wrote down to any market, and I always tried to give my editors and readers their money's worth.)" The Gothic novels are identifiable, but none of Koontz's acknowledged work fits into the latter category.

Koontz has stated on his website that he used only the ten known pen names and "there are no secret pen names used by Dean"; he adds that his own identity was stolen by "a person he had previously worked with professionally", who submitted letters and some articles to fanzines under Koontz's name between 1969 and at least the early 1970s. Koontz has stated that he was only made aware of these bogus letters and articles in 1991 in a written admission from the identity thief. He has stated that he will reveal this person's name in his memoirs.

== Awards ==
Work	Year & Award	Category	Result	Ref.
Beastchild	1971 Locus Award	SF Novel	Nominated	
Beastchild	1971 Locus Award	Short Fiction	Nominated	
Beastchild	1971 Hugo Award	Novella	Nominated	
Strangers	1986 British Fantasy Award	August Derleth Award	Nominated	
Strangers	1987 World Fantasy Award	Novel	Nominated	
Oddkins: A Fable for All Ages	1989 Locus Award	Novella	Nominated	
Midnight	1989 Bram Stoker Award	Novel	Nominated	
Midnight	1990 Locus Award	Horror	Nominated	
The Bad Place	1991 Locus Award	Horror/Dark Fantasy Novel	Nominated	
Hideaway	1992 Bram Stoker Award	Novel	Nominated	
Hideaway	1995 Grand Prix de l'Imaginaire	Foreign Novel	Nominated	
Watchers	1990 Soaring Eagle Book Award		1st Runner-up	
Watchers	1993 Japan Adventure Fiction Association Prize		Won	
Mr. Murder	1994 Locus Award	Horror Novel	Nominated	
Dark Rivers of the Heart	1995 Prometheus Award	SF Novel	Nominated	
Strange Highways	1995 Bram Stoker Award	Fiction Collection	Nominated	
Strange Highways	1996 Locus Award	Collection	Nominated	
Fear Nothing	1998 Bram Stoker Award	Novel	Nominated	
The Paper Doorway: Funny Verse and Nothing Worse	2003 Utah Beehive Book Award	Poetry	Nominated	
Robot Santa	2004 Bram Stoker Award	Work for Young Readers	Nominated	
Life Expectancy	2005 Gumshoe Awards	Thriller	Nominated	
Odd Thomas	2006 Evergreen Book Award		Nominated	
What the Night Knows	2011 Goodreads Choice Awards	Horror	Nominated	
Odd Apocalypse	2012 Goodreads Choice Awards	Horror	Nominated	
Odd Apocalypse	2013 Audie Awards	Thriller or Suspense	Nominated	
Deeply Odd	2013 Goodreads Choice Awards	Horror	Nominated	
Innocence	2014 Killer Nashville Awards	Silver Falchion Award – Speculative/Horror/Science Fiction/Fantasy	Won	
The City	2014 Goodreads Choice Awards	Horror	Nominated	
Saint Odd	2015 Goodreads Choice Awards	Horror	Won	
The Forest of Lost Souls	2025 Audie Awards	Thriller or Suspense	Nominated	

Koontz was also nominated in 1988 and 1989 for the World Fantasy Special Award—Professional award. He also won the World Horror Convention Grand Master Award in 1996 & the Ross Macdonald Literary Award in 2003.

== Screenplays ==
- 1979: CHiPs episode 306: "Counterfeit" (as Brian Coffey)
- 1990: The Face of Fear
- 1998: Phantoms
- 2005: Dean Koontz's Frankenstein

== Film adaptations ==
- Demon Seed (1977) – MGM – starring Julie Christie, Fritz Weaver, and Robert Vaughn as the voice of Proteus
- The Passengers (1977) – MGM – starring Jean-Louis Trintignant (French film adaptation of Koontz's novel Shattered)
- Watchers (1988) – Universal Pictures – starring Corey Haim, Barbara Williams, and Michael Ironside
- Whispers (1990) – Cinepix – starring Victoria Tennant, Chris Sarandon, and Jean LeClere
- Watchers II (1990) – Concorde Pictures – starring Marc Singer and Tracy Scoggins
- The Face of Fear (1990) – CBS – starring Pam Dawber and Lee Horsley, also includes Kevin Conroy and William Sadler
- Servants of Twilight (1991) – Trimark – starring Bruce Greenwood
- Watchers 3 (1994) – Concorde Pictures – starring Wings Hauser
- Hideaway (1995) – Tristar Pictures – starring Jeff Goldblum, Christine Lahti, Jeremy Sisto, and Alicia Silverstone
- Intensity (1997) – Fox – starring John C. McGinley, Molly Parker, and Piper Laurie
- Mr. Murder (1998) – ABC – starring Stephen Baldwin, Thomas Haden Church, and James Coburn
- Phantoms (1998) – Miramax/Dimension Films – starring Peter O'Toole, Ben Affleck, Rose McGowan, and Joanna Going
- Watchers Reborn (1998) – Concorde Pictures – starring Mark Hamill
- Sole Survivor (2000) – Fox – starring Billy Zane, John C. McGinley, and Gloria Reuben
- Black River (2001) – Fox – starring Jay Mohr and Stephen Tobolowsky
- Frankenstein (2004) – USA Network – starring Adam Goldberg, Parker Posey, Michael Madsen, Vincent Perez, and Thomas Kretschmann (Koontz pulled out of the project midway through production because he did not like the direction the film was headed. He ended up writing his own books with the storyline he had originally created. The project continued without him.)
- Odd Thomas (2013) – starring Anton Yelchin
