= 1976 in literature =

This article contains information about the literary events and publications of 1976.

== Events ==
- June 21 – The Market Theatre in Johannesburg, South Africa, is opened as a multiracial venue by Barney Simon.
- September 3 – Novelist Antonio di Benedetto is released from prison after 18 months of imprisonment and torture under the National Reorganization Process (military dictatorship) in Argentina.
- September 9 – The Royal Shakespeare Company starts a noted production of Shakespeare's Macbeth at The Other Place, Stratford-upon-Avon, England, with Ian McKellen and Judi Dench in the leading roles, directed by Trevor Nunn.
- October 25 – The Royal National Theatre on London's South Bank opens in premises designed by Sir Denys Lasdun, with a performance of Goldoni's 18th-century comedy Il Campiello.
- unknown dates
  - Théâtre Nanterre-Amandiers is established in new premises at Nanterre.
  - Mary Ronnie became the world's first female national librarian, at the National Library of New Zealand.

== New books ==
=== Fiction ===
- Brian Aldiss – The Malacia Tapestry
- Kingsley Amis – The Alteration
- Isaac Asimov – The Bicentennial Man and Other Stories
- Margaret Atwood – Lady Oracle
- Elliott Baker – Klynt's Law
- Nina Bawden – Afternoon of a Good Woman
- Martin Bax – The Hospital Ship.
- Ann Beattie – Chilly Scenes of Winter
- Peter Benchley – The Deep
- Jack M. Bickham – Twister
- Michael Bishop – And Strange at Ecbatan the Trees
- John Blackburn – The Face of the Lion
- Lady Caroline Blackwood – The Stepdaughter
- Pierre Boileau and Thomas Narcejac – La lèpre
- Ben Bova
  - City of Darkness
  - The Multiple Man
- Ray Bradbury – Long After Midnight
- Marion Zimmer Bradley
  - Drums of Darkness
  - The Shattered Chain (tenth in the Darkover series)
- John Braine – Waiting for Sheila
- William F. Buckley – Saving the Queen (the first Blackford Oakes thriller)
- Eleanor Alice Burford
  - The Passionate Enemies (writing as Jean Plaidy)
  - The Plantagenet Prelude (writing as Jean Plaidy)
  - The Pride of the Peacock (writing as Victoria Holt)
  - Saraband for Two Sisters (writing as Philippa Carr)
- Anthony Burgess – Beard's Roman Women
- Taylor Caldwell – Ceremony of the Innocent
- Ramsey Campbell – The Height of the Scream
- Rosemary Carter
  - Forests of the Dragon
  - Man of the Wild
- Jack L. Chalker – A Jungle of Stars
- Vera Chapman – The King's Damosel
- James Hadley Chase – Do Me a Favour, Drop Dead
- C. J. Cherryh
  - Brothers of Earth (first in the Hanan Rebellion duology)
  - Gate of Ivrel (first in The Morgaine Cycle)
- Agatha Christie – Sleeping Murder
- Arthur C. Clarke (edited by Angus Wells) – The Best of Arthur C. Clarke 1937 – 1955
- Jon Cleary – A Sound of Lightning
- Theodore R. Cogswell (co-writing with Charles A. Spano, Jr.) – Spock, Messiah!
- Michael Collins – The Blood-Red Dream
- Catherine Cookson
  - The Slow Awakening (writing as Catherine Merchant)
  - The Tide of Life
- Michael Crichton – Eaters of the Dead
- Clive Cussler – Raise the Titanic!
- Lionel Davidson – The Sun Chemist
- Dorothy Salisbury Davis – A Death in the Life
- Len Deighton – Twinkle, Twinkle, Little Spy
- Samuel R. Delany – Triton
- Colin Dexter – Last Seen Wearing (second in the Inspector Morse series)
- Philip K. Dick (co-written with Roger Zelazny) – Deus Irae
- Peter Dickinson – King and Joker
- Gordon R. Dickson – The Dragon and the George
- Jane Donnelly
  - Dark Pursuer
  - The Intruder
  - The Silver Cage
- Rosalyn Drexler (written as Julia Sorel)
  - Dawn: Portrait of a Teenage Runaway (TV film novelization)
  - Rocky (film novelization)
- Michel Droit – La Mort du connétable
- Allen Drury – A God Against the Gods
- Lois Duncan – Summer of Fear
- Allan W. Eckert – The HAB Theory
- Clive Egleton – State Visit
- Charles Einstein – The Blackjack Hijack
- Buchi Emecheta – The Bride Price
- Marian Engel – Bear
- Paul Erdman – The Crash of '79
- John Farris – The Fury
- Dick Francis – In the Frame
- Brian Freemantle – The November Man
- Alan Dean Foster (ghostwritten as George Lucas) – Star Wars: From the Adventures of Luke Skywalker
- Paula Fox – The Widow's Children
- Dick Francis – In the Frame
- Christopher Frank – The Dream of the Mad Monkey (Le Rêve du singe fou)
- Morton Freedgood (written as John Godey) – The Talisman
- John Gardner
  - Moriarty
  - To Run a Little Faster
- Brian Garfield – Gundown
- Hugh Garner – The Intruders
- Romain Gary (writing as Émile Ajar) – Hocus Bogus (Pseudo)
- Noel Gerson
  - Neptune
  - Special Agent
- William Goldman – Magic
- Richard Gordon – Doctor on the Job (fourteenth in the Doctor series)
- Winston Graham – The Four Swans (sixth in the Poldark series)
- Gerald Green – The Hostage Heart
- Peter Van Greenaway – Suffer! Little Children
- Sam Greenlee – Baghdad Blues
- Judith Guest – Ordinary People
- Joe Haldeman – Mindbridge
- Alex Haley – Roots: The Saga of an American Family
- Donald Hamilton – The Retaliators (seventeenth in the Matt Helm series)
- Harry Harrison – Skyfall
- Sterling Hayden – Voyage: A Novel of 1896
- Marcy Heidish – A Woman Called Moses
- Frank Herbert – Children of Dune
- James Herbert – The Survivor
- James Herriot – Vets Might Fly (fifth in the James Herriot series)
- George V. Higgins – The Judgment of Deke Hunter
- Jack Higgins – Storm Warning
- Reginald Hill – Another Death in Venice
- Helen Hodgman – Blue Skies
- Robert Holdstock
  - Eye Among the Blind
  - The Graveyard Cross
  - Magic Man
  - On the Inside
  - The Time Beyond Age
  - Travellers
- Cecelia Holland
  - Floating Worlds
- Velda Johnston
  - Deveron Hall
  - The Frenchman
- Gayl Jones – Eva's Man
- Thomas Keneally – Season in Purgatory
- Warren Kiefer – The Pontius Pilate Papers
- Dean Koontz
  - Prison of Ice (writing as David Axton)
  - Night Chills
- William Kotzwinkle – Doctor Rat
- Michael Kurland – Tomorrow Knight
- Derek Lambert (writing as Richard Falkirk) – Blackstone Underground (fifth in the Blackstone series)
- Louis L'Amour
  - The Rider of Lost Creek
  - To the Far Blue Mountains
  - Where the Long Grass Blows
- Ursula K. Le Guin – Orsinian Tales
- Elsie Lee
  - The Nabob's Widow
  - Roommates
- John Lee – The Ninth Man
- Tanith Lee – Don't Bite the Sun
- Stanisław Lem – The Chain of Chance
- Elmore Leonard – Swag
- Rhoda Lerman – The Girl That He Marries
- Ira Levin – The Boys from Brazil
- Roger Longrigg – The Babe in the Wood
- Robert Ludlum – The Gemini Contenders
- Richard A. Lupoff
  - The Crack in the Sky
  - Lisa Kane
  - Sandworld
  - The Triune Man
- Ross Macdonald – The Blue Hammer (eighteenth and final novel in the Lew Archer series)
- Alistair MacLean – The Golden Gate
- George R. R. Martin – A Song for Lya
- Eugene McCabe – Victims: A Tale from Fermanagh
- Helen McCloy – The Changeling Conspiracy
- Barbara Mertz
  - Legend in Green Velvet (writing as Elizabeth Peters)
  - Patriot's Dream (writing as Barbara Michaels)
- Nicholas Meyer – The West End Horror
- James Mills – The Seventh Power
- Thomas F. Monteleone – The Time Connection
- Robin Moore
  - Dubai
  - The Establishment (co-written with Harold Shumate)
  - Hotel Tomayne
  - The Kaufman Snatch
  - The Pearl Harbor Cover-Up (co-written with Frank Schuler)
  - The Season (co-written with Patricia Hornung)
  - The Terminal Connection
  - Valency Girl (co-written with Susan Deitz)
- Michael Moorcock
  - The Adventures of Una Persson and Catherine Cornelius in the 20th Century
  - The End of All Songs
  - Moorcock's Book of Martyrs
  - The Sailor on the Seas of Fate
  - The Time of the Hawklords (co-writing as with Michael Butterworth)
- Ryū Murakami – Almost Transparent Blue
- Fănuș Neagu – Frumoșii nebuni ai marilor orașe ("Those Beautiful Lunatics of the Great Cities")
- Christopher Nicole
  - Dark Passage (writing as Andrew York)
  - Mistress of Darkness
  - Guillotine (writing as Mark Logan)
  - Tricolour (writing as Mark Logan)
- Larry Niven
  - The Long ARM of Gil Hamilton
  - A World Out of Time
- Frederick Nolan – The Mittenwald Syndicate
- Andrew J. Offutt
  - Beautiful Bitch (writing as John Cleve)
  - Chieftain of Andor
  - Disciplined! (writing as Jeff Morehead)
  - The Erogenous Zone (writing as John Cleve)
  - Succulent Line-Up (writing as John Cleve)
  - Serena, Darling (writing as John Cleve)
  - The Submission of Claudine (writing as Turk Winter)
  - Triple Play! (writing as Jeff Morehead)
  - The Undying Wizard (second volume in the Cormac Mac Art continuation series
- T. V. Olsen
  - Day of the Buzzard
  - Westward They Rode
- Robert B. Parker – Promised Land
- James Patterson – The Thomas Berryman Number
- Gary Paulsen
  - The Death Specialists
  - The Implosion Effect
- Samuel Anthony Peeples – The Man Who Died Twice
- Doris Piserchia – A Billion Days of Earth
- Denis Pitts – The Predator
- Dudley Pope – Ramage's Diamond (seventh in the Ramage series)
- Timothy Powers – The Skies Discrowned
- Terry Pratchett – The Dark Side of the Sun
- Richard Price – Bloodbrothers
- Christopher Priest – The Space Machine
- Bill Pronzini
  - Freebooty (writing as Jack Foxx)
  - Games
  - The Running of Beasts (with Barry N. Malzberg)
- Manuel Puig – Kiss of the Spider Woman
- Simon Raven – The Survivors
- Piers Paul Read – Polonaise
- Ishmael Reed – Flight to Canada
- Douglas Reeman
  - Passage to Mutiny (ninth in the Richard Bolitho series, writing as Alexander Kent)
  - Surface with Daring
- Ruth Rendell
  - A Demon in My View
  - The Fallen Curtain
- Anne Rice – Interview with the Vampire
- Harold Robbins – The Lonely Lady
- Tom Robbins – Even Cowgirls Get the Blues
- Rosemary Rogers – Wicked Loving Lies
- William Rotsler (written as John Ryder Hall) – Futureworld (film novelization)
- Lawrence Sanders
  - The Tangent Factor
  - The Tangent Objective
- Pamela Sargent – Cloned Lives
- Elizabeth Savage – The Girls from the Five Great Valleys
- Hubert Selby Jr. – The Demon
- David Seltzer – The Omen (film novelization)
- Tom Sharpe – Wilt
- Bob Shaw
  - Cosmic Kaleidoscope
  - A Wreath of Stars
- Sidney Sheldon – A Stranger in the Mirror
- Anne Rivers Siddons – Heartbreak Hotel
- Alan Sillitoe – The Widower's Son
- Robert Silverberg – Shadrach in the Furnace
- Clifford D. Simak – Shakespeare's Planet
- George Frederick Sims – The End of the Web
- Upton Sinclair (died 1968) – The Coal War
- Carolyn Slaughter – The Story of the Weasel
- Guy N. Smith
  - The Ghoul (film novelization)
  - Night of the Crabs (first in the Crabs series)
  - Return of the Werewolf (second in the Werewolf by Moonlight series)
- Wilbur Smith – Cry Wolf
- Jerry Sohl
  - Blow-Dry (writing by Nathan Butler)
  - I, Aleppo
- Muriel Spark – The Takeover
- Judith St. George – The Secret in the Old House
- Brian Stableford
  - The Face of Heaven (first in The Realms of Tartarus trilogy)
  - The Florians (first in the Daedalus Mission series)
  - The Mind-Riders
- Christina Stead – Miss Herbert (The Suburban Wife)
- John Steinbeck – The Acts of King Arthur and His Noble Knights
- Fred Mustard Stewart – Six Weeks
- Mary Stewart – Touch Not the Cat
- David Storey – Saville
- Jacqueline Susann – Dolores
- Rosemary Sutcliff – Blood Feud
- Douglas Sutherland – Strike!
- Bernard Taylor – The Godsend
- Elizabeth Taylor (died 1975) – Blaming
- Mildred D. Taylor – Roll of Thunder, Hear My Cry
- Emma Tennant – Hotel de Dream
- Paul Theroux – The Family Arsenal
- Craig Thomas – Rat Trap
- Arthur Tofte – The Day the Earth Stood Still (film novelization)
- Glen Tomasetti – Thoroughly Decent People: An Australian Folktale
- Elleston Trevor (writing as Adam Hall) – The Kobra Manifesto (seventh in the Quiller series)
- William Trevor – The Children of Dynmouth
- Leon Uris – Trinity
- Jack Vance – Maske: Thaery
- Gore Vidal – 1876
- Kurt Vonnegut – Slapstick
- Frank Waldman – The Pink Panther Strikes Again (film novelization)
- Alice Walker – Meridian
- Irving Wallace – The R Document
- Ian Watson – Orgasmachine
- Alec Waugh – Married to a Spy
- Angus Wells
  - The Burning Man (written as Andrew Quiller)
  - Death Wears Grey (written as Andrew Quiller)
  - The Golden Dead (written as Andrew Quiller)
  - The Land of Mist (written as Andrew Quiller)
  - The Return of a Man Called Horse (film novelization)
  - Vengeance Hunt (written as Andrew Quiller)
- Morris West – The Navigator
- Donald E. Westlake – Dancing Aztecs
- Lionel White – Jailbreak
- Patrick White – A Fringe of Leaves
- Christopher Wood
  - The Further Adventures of Barry Lyndon by Himself
  - Seven Nights in Japan (written as John Drew) (film novelization)
- Richard Woodley – The Bad News Bears (film novelization)
- Colin Wilson – The Space Vampires
- Gene Wolfe – The Devil in a Forest
- Roger Zelazny
  - Bridge of Ashes
  - Doorways in the Sand
  - The Hand of Oberon (fourth in The Chronicles of Amber series)
  - My Name Is Legion

=== Children and young people ===
- Raymond Abrashkin (with Jay Williams) – Danny Dunn Scientific Detective (fourteenth in the Danny Dunn series)
- Richard Adams – The Tyger Voyage
- Lynne Reid Banks
  - The Adventures of King Midas
  - The Farthest-Away Mountain
- Marc Brown – Arthur's Nose (first in the Arthur Read series)
- Mary Virginia Carey – The Mystery of Death Trap Mine (24th in the Alfred Hitchcock and the Three Investigators series)
- Betty Cavanna – Mystery of the Emerald Buddha
- Michael Collins (as William Arden) – The Mystery of the Dancing Devil (25th in the Alfred Hitchcock and the Three Investigators series)
- Helen Cresswell – The Winter of the Birds
- Vic Crume – The Shaggy D.A. (film novelization)
- Peter Dickinson (illustrated by David Smee) – The Blue Hawk
- Jack Gantos – Rotten Ralph (first in the Rotten Ralph series)
- Roger Hargreaves (Mr. Men)
  - Mr. Bounce
  - Mr. Chatterbox
  - Mr. Dizzy
  - Mr. Impossible
  - Mr. Jelly
  - Mr. Funny
  - Mr. Fussy
  - Mr. Lazy
  - Mr. Mean
  - Mr. Muddle
  - Mr. Noisy
- Janet Quin-Harkin (illustrated by Anita Lobel) – Peter Penny's Dance
- Marguerite Henry (illustrated by Wesley Dennis) – A Pictorial Life Story of Misty
- Diana Wynne Jones – Power of Three
- Judith Kerr – Mog's Christmas (second in the Mog series)
- Alexander Key – Jagger, the Dog from Elsewhere
- E. L. Konigsburg – Father's Arcane Daughter
- Richard Peck – Are You in the House Alone?
- Florence Engel Randall – A Watcher in the Woods
- William Rawls – Summer of the Monkeys
- Maurice Sendak (co-writing with Matthew Margolis) – Some Swell Pup or Are You Sure You Want a Dog?
- William Steig
  - Abel's Island
  - The Amazing Bone
- Dr. Seuss
  - The Cat's Quizzer
  - Hooper Humperdink...? Not Him! (writing as Theo. LeSieg)
- Ruth Plumly Thompson (illustrated by Dick Martin) – The Enchanted Island of Oz
- Eve Titus – Basil in Mexico (fourth in the Basil of Baker Street series)
- Gertrude Chandler Warner – Benny Uncovers a Mystery (19th in the Boxcar Children series)
- Robert Westall – The Wind Eye
- Paul Zindel – Pardon Me, You're Stepping on My Eyeball!

=== Drama ===
- Ngugi wa Thiong’o and Mugo – The Trial of Dedan Kimathi
- Neil Simon – California Suite

=== Non-fiction ===
- Bruce Bahrenburg – The Creation of Dino De Laurentiis' King Kong
- James Herbert Brennan – An Occult History of the World
- Lothar-Günther Buchheim – U-Boot-Krieg
- Richard Dawkins – The Selfish Gene
- Leonard Gribble
  - Famous Mysteries of Detection
  - Famous Mysteries of Modern Times
- Tony Hillerman (editor) – The Spell of New Mexico
- Christopher Keane – The Hunter
- Arthur Koestler – The Thirteenth Tribe
- Ron Kovic – Born on the Fourth of July
- Daniel P. Mannix – We Who Are Not as Others
- James A. Michener – Sports in America
- Arthur Ransome (died 1967) – The Autobiography of Arthur Ransome (edited by Rupert Hart-Davis)
- Teddy Stauffer – Forever is a Hell of a Long Time: An Autobiography
- William Stevenson – A Man Called Intrepid
- Bob Woodward (with Carl Bernstein) – The Final Days

== Births ==
- May 31 - Douglas Stuart, Scottish-American writer
- August 29 - Mieko Kawakami, Japanese novelist and poet
- October 31 – Seth Abramson, American journalist and poet
- unknown dates
  - Bora Chung, Korean short story writer and novelist
  - Kristin Cashore, American young adult and fantasy writer

== Deaths ==
- January 12 – Agatha Christie, English crime writer (born 1890)
- January 25 – Victor Ehrenberg, German historian (born 1891)
- February 2 – Barbara Euphan Todd, English children's writer (born 1890)
- February 12 – John Lewis, Welsh philosopher (born 1889)
- March 5 – Charles Lederer, American screenwriter and film director (born 1910)
- March 7 – Tove Ditlevsen, Danish poet and fiction writer (suicide, born 1917)
- March 13 – Sergiu Dan, Romanian novelist and journalist (born 1903)
- April 2 – Taos Amrouche, Algerian novelist (born 1913)
- April 28 – Richard Hughes, British novelist (born 1900)
- May 7 – Alison Uttley, English writer of children's books (born 1884)
- July 3 – Alexander Lernet-Holenia, Austrian poet, dramatist and fiction writer (born 1897)
- July 15 – Paul Gallico, American novelist, short story and sports writer (born 1897)
- August 9 – José Lezama Lima, Cuban writer and poet (born [1910)
- August 29 – Kazi Nazrul Islam, Bengali poet (born 1899)
- September 10 – Dalton Trumbo, American novelist and screenwriter (born 1905)
- October 30 – Barbu Solacolu, Romanian poet, translator and economist (born 1897)
- November 4 – Robert Speaight, English actor, biographer and essayist (born 1904)
- November 6 – Patrick Dennis, American novelist (pancreatic cancer, born 1921)
- November 23 – André Malraux, French novelist (born 1901)
- December 21 – Munro Leaf, American children's author (born 1905)
- December 22 – Martín Luis Guzmán, Mexican novelist and journalist (born 1887)
- December 26 – Yashpal, Hindi novelist (born 1903)
- December 29 – G. B. Edwards, Guernsey-born writer (born 1899)

== Awards ==
- Friedenspreis des Deutschen Buchhandels: Max Frisch
- Hugo Award for Best Novella: Roger Zelazny, Home Is the Hangman
