= William F. Buckley Jr. bibliography =

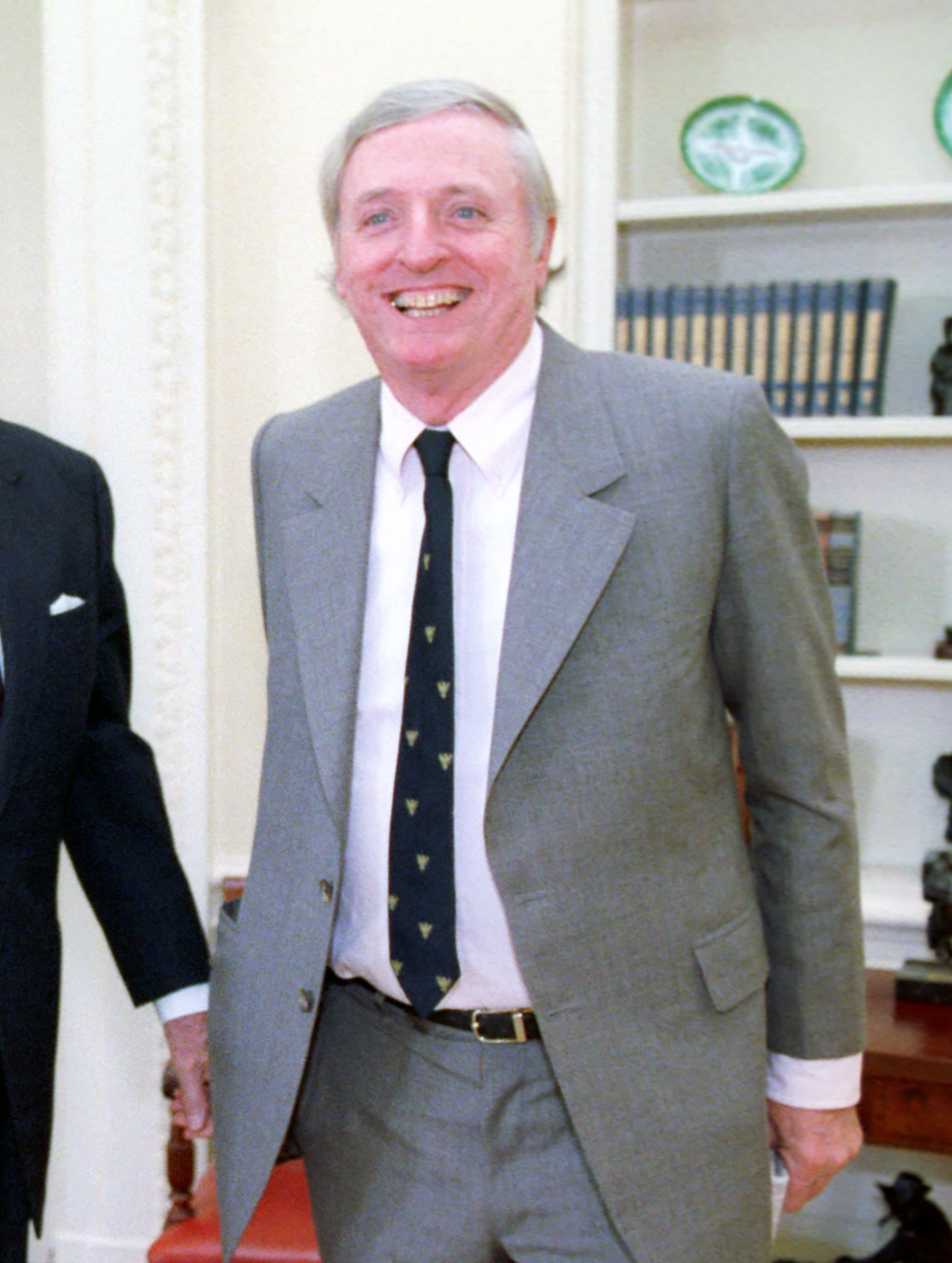
- Non-fiction↙: 32
- Travel↙: 5
- Fiction↙: 8
- Blackford Oakes↙: 12

The following is a list of written works by William F. Buckley Jr.

== Articles ==
- "Replies from American Debaters," with Alfred MaKulec, Gordon Mack, Elizareth B. Flory, Roger Cozens, Howard E. Goldfarb, Charles E. Lilien, Harry B. Stults, Irwin Kuhr, Charles Radcliffe, Frederick M. Peyser Jr. & C. David Cornell. Quarterly Journal of Speech, vol. 36, no. 1 (1950), pp. 15-22. doi:10.1080/00335635009381537.
- "Harvard Hogs the Headlines." Human Events, vol. 8, no. 20 (1951), pp. 1–5.
- "The Colossal Flunk." American Mercury (Mar. 1952), pp. 29–37.
- "What Price Uniformity?" Human Events, vol. 9, no. 24 (1952).
- "Father Fullman's Assault." Catholic World (Aug. 1952), pp. 328–333.
- "Freedom to Agree." American Mercury (Jun. 1953), pp. 101–107.
- "Does Just Any College Qualify?" The Freeman (Jun. 14, 1954), pp. 667–670.
- "The Liberal Mind." Facts Forum News (Jun. 1955), pp. 6, 52–57, 60.
- "On Experiencing Gore Vidal." Esquire (Aug. 1969), pp. 108–130.
- "Amnesty International." Newark Advocate (Apr. 13, 1970), p. 4. Archived from the original.
- "Human Rights and Foreign Policy: A Proposal." Foreign Affairs, vol. 58, no. 4 (Spring 1980), pp. 775–96. doi:10.2307/20040504. JSTOR 20040504.
- "The Poverty of Anti-Communism," with Robert Conquest, Nathan Glazer, and John Lukacs. The National Interest, no. 55 (Spring 1999), pp. 75–85. JSTOR 42897145.

== Non-fiction ==
External videos
- Panel discussion on God and Man at Yale, November 4, 2011, C-SPAN
- Panel discussion on The Unmaking of a Mayor, November 18, 2015, C-SPAN

- God and Man at Yale. Chicago: Henry Regnery Company. 1951. ISBN 9780895266927.
- McCarthy and His Enemies: The Record and Its Meaning. Chicago: Henry Regnery Company. 1954. ISBN 9780895264725.
- Up from Liberalism. Introduction by Senator Barry Goldwater. Foreword by John Dos Passos. Lanham, Maryland: Rowman & Littlefield Publishers. 1959. ISBN 9781258119836.
- The Committee and Its Critics: A Calm Review of the House Committee on Un-American Activities. New York: G. P. Putnam's Sons. 1962. ISBN 9780911956061.
- Rumbles Left and Right: A Book About Troubling People and Ideas (PDF). Introduction by Russell Kirk. New York: G. P. Putnam's Sons. 1963. ISBN 9781245552745.
- Dialogues in Americanism. with Steve Allen, L. Brent Bozell, James MacGregor Burns, Robert M. Hutchins, and Willmoore Kendall. Chicago: Henry Regnery Company. 1964. ISBN 9780911956146.
- The Unmaking of a Mayor. New York: Viking Press. 1966. ISBN 0870003917.
- The Jeweler's Eye. New York: G. P. Putnam's Sons. 1968. ISBN 9781111606787.
- Odyssey of a Friend: Whittaker Chambers' Letters to William F. Buckley Jr. 1954–1961. New York: G. P. Putnam's Sons. 1969. ISBN 9780895267887.
- The Governor Listeth. New York: G. P. Putnam's Sons. 1970. ISBN 9780425020241.
- Did You Ever See a Dream Walking?: American Conservative Thought in the Twentieth Century. Indianapolis: Bobbs-Merrill Company. 1970. ISBN 0672512408.
- Quotations from Chairman Bill. New Rochelle, New York: Arlington House. 1970. ISBN 9780870000638.
- Cruising Speed: A Documentary. New York: Putnam. 1971. ISBN 9780399101816.
- Inveighing We Will Go. New York: G. P. Putnam's Sons. 1972. ISBN 9780399110375.
- Four Reforms: A Guide for the Seventies. New York: G. P. Putnam's Sons. 1973. ISBN 9780399111709.
- United Nations Journal: A Delegate's Odyssey. New York: G. P. Putnam's Sons. 1974. ISBN 9780399114083.
- Execution Eve: And Other Contemporary Ballads. New York: G. P. Putnam's Sons. 1975. ISBN 9780399115318.
- A Hymnal: The Controversial Arts. New York: G. P. Putnam's Sons. 1978. ISBN 9783991222736.
- Overdrive: A Personal Documentary. New York: Doubleday. 1983. ISBN 9780385182690.
- Right Reason: A Collection. New York: Doubleday. 1985. ISBN 9780385152358.
- On the Firing Line: The Public Life of Our Public Figures. New York: Random House. 1989. ISBN 9780394575681.
- Gratitude: Reflections on What We Owe to Our Country. New York: Random House. 1990. ISBN 9780394576749.
- In Search of Anti-Semitism. New York: Continuum International. 1992. ISBN 9780826406194.
- Happy Days Were Here Again: Reflections of a Libertarian Journalist. New York: Random House. 1993. ISBN 9780679403982.
- Buckley: The Right Word. New York: Random House. 1996. ISBN 9780614206951.
- Nearer, My God: An Autobiography of Faith. New York: Doubleday. 1997. ISBN 9780385478182.
- The Lexicon: A Cornucopia of Wonderful Words for the Inquisitive Word Lover. New York: Harcourt. 1998. ISBN 9780156006163.
- Let Us Talk of Many Things: The Collected Speeches. New York: Forum (Prima Publishing). 2000. ISBN 9780761525516.
- The Fall of the Berlin Wall. Hoboken: Wiley, John & Sons. 2004. ISBN 9780471267362.
- Miles Gone By: A Literary Autobiography. Chicago: Regnery Publishing. 2004. ISBN 9780895260895.
- Cancel Your Own Goddam Subscription. New York: Basic Books. 2007. ISBN 9780465002429.
- Flying High: Remembering Barry Goldwater. New York: Basic Books. 2008. ISBN 9780465008360.
- The Reagan I Knew. New York: Perseus Publishing. 2008. ISBN 9780465009268.
- Buckley vs. Vidal: The Historic 1968 ABC News Debates. Introduction by Robert Gordon. Memphis, Tennessee: Devault-Graves Digital Editions. 2015. ISBN 9781942531128.

== Travel ==
- Airborne: A Sentimental Journey. New York: Charles Scribner's Sons. 1976. ISBN 9780025180406.
- Atlantic High: A Celebration. New York: Doubleday. 1982. ISBN 9780316114400.
- Racing Through Paradise: A Pacific Passage. New York: Random House. 1987. ISBN 9780394557816.
- Windfall: The End of the Affair. New York: Random House. 1992. ISBN 9780679403975.
- Getting About: Travel Writings of William F. Buckley Jr. Encounter Books. 2023. ISBN 9781641773171.

== Fiction ==
- The Temptation of Wilfred Malachey. New York: Doubleday. 1985. ISBN 9780894809231.
- Brothers No More. New York: Doubleday. 1995. ISBN 9780385477949.
- The Redhunter: A Novel Based on the Life of Senator Joe McCarthy. New York: Warner Books, Inc. 1999. ISBN 9780316115896.
- Spytime: The Undoing of James Jesus Angleton. San Diego: Harcourt Brace. 2001. ISBN 9780151005130.
- Elvis in the Morning. San Diego: Harcourt Brace. 2001. ISBN 9780151006434.
- Nuremberg: The Reckoning. San Diego: Harcourt Brace. 2002. ISBN 9780151006793.
- Getting It Right: A Novel. Washington DC: Regnery Publishing. 2003. ISBN 9780895261380.
- The Rake: A Novel. Washington DC: HarperCollins. 2007. ISBN 9780061238550.

== Blackford Oakes novels ==
- Saving the Queen. New York: Doubleday. 1976. ISBN 9780385038003.
- Stained Glass. New York: Doubleday. 1978. ISBN 9780446823234.
- Who's on First. New York: Doubleday. 1980. ISBN 9780385146814.
- Marco Polo, If You Can. New York: Doubleday. 1982. ISBN 9780385152327.
- The Story of Henri Tod. New York: Doubleday. 1984. ISBN 9781581824780.
- See You Later, Alligator. New York: Doubleday. 1985. ISBN 9780385194426.
- High Jinx. New York: Doubleday. 1986. ISBN 9781888952520.
- Mongoose R.I.P. New York: Random House. 1987. ISBN 9780394559315.
- Tucker's Last Stand. New York: Random House. 1990. ISBN 9780394576756.
- A Very Private Plot. New York: William Morrow & Company, Inc. 1993. ISBN 9780688127954.
- The Blackford Oakes Reader. Bloomington: iUniverse, Inc. 1999. ISBN 9780836280982.
- Last Call for Blackford Oakes. New York: Harcourt. 2005. ISBN 9780151010851.
