= Later Alligator (disambiguation) =

Later Alligator is a 2019 video game

Later Alligator may also refer to:

- See You Later, Alligator, a 1956 single originally titled "Later, Alligator"
- See You Later, Alligator (novel), by William F. Buckley, Jr
