= The Indian in the Cupboard =

1980 children's fantasy novel by Lynne Reid Banks

- First edition (UK)
- Author: Lynne Reid Banks
- Illustrator: Robin Jacques (UK); Brock Cole (US)
- Language: English
- Series: Indian in the Cupboard
- Genre: Children's fantasy
- Publisher: J. M. Dent (UK); Doubleday and Company (US)
- Publication date: 1980
- Publication place: United Kingdom
- ISBN: 978-0-380-60012-0
- OCLC: 8878954
- Followed by: The Return of the Indian

The Indian in the Cupboard is a low fantasy children's novel by the British writer Lynne Reid Banks. It was published in 1980 with illustrations by Robin Jacques (UK) and Brock Cole (US). It was later adapted as a 1995 children's film of the same name. Later books in the series were illustrated by Piers Sanford.

The original book was followed by four sequels: The Return of the Indian (1985); The Secret of the Indian (1989); The Mystery of the Cupboard (1993); and The Key to the Indian (1998). All were published by Doubleday Books in hardcover, then by Avon Books, now HarperCollins, in paperback. There have been multiple reprints in various formats, including movie tie-in editions. The publisher recommended reading level is age nine and up.

All the books revolve around a young boy, Omri, who discovers the powers of a magical cupboard. When plastic toys are locked in the cupboard, they become real, living beings, resulting in Omri befriending an 18th-century Iroquois (Haudenosaunee) chief named Little Bear (Little Bull in some editions). As the series progresses, Omri and his friend Patrick learn more about the cupboard's powers, including its ability to transport people to and from through history.

The book has received numerous awards and been both critiqued and praised on its literary merit, and has once been recommended reading in the school curriculum. In a review of the first book of the series, Kirkus Reviews observed, "The first book had a fine balance between childish desire to play with the tiny figures and awareness that, though small, they were real people who ought not to be so manipulated." The book was reviewed in the 1981 New York Times article "BOOKS: Best For Children" where it was called "the best novel of the year". At one time, classrooms and libraries widely accepted the book, to the point that it was part of the teaching curricula for children at the novel's recommend reading level. In 2003 and 2004, HarperTrophy reprinted the original book, along with the other four novels in the series, and commissioned Michael Koelsch to illustrate new cover artworks.

== Plot summary ==
On Omri's ninth birthday, his best friend Patrick gives him the disappointing gift of a small plastic Indian figurine. Omri also receives a white metal medicine cupboard from his brother. The only key in the house that fits the cupboard's lock is the key to Omri's great-grandmother's jewellery box. Omri puts the plastic figurine in the cupboard and locks it with the key, only to discover the following morning that the figurine has come to life as a three-inch-tall Iroquois Indian man.

Though the tiny man, whose name is Little Bear (Little Bull in some editions), initially believes that Omri is a god, he quickly realizes that Omri is only an ordinary, albeit giant, boy, and proceeds to boss him around. Little Bear explores the house and garden, while Omri provides for Little Bear's needs. Little Bear's rejection of the gift of a tipi (as Iroquois live in longhouses) leads Omri to research more about the Iroquois people, causing him to rethink some of his stereotypical views of American Indians and to realize that Little Bear is a real person with a history and culture. Omri is particularly affected when a plastic figure of an elderly Native American chief dies of shock upon being brought to life. Little Bear, however, claims the old chief's headdress, as he is the only one around to take the title, and becomes more demanding than ever.

Patrick offers Omri a gift of a plastic cowboy so that Omri can play properly with his toy Indian. Omri rejects the gift, which leads to letting Patrick in on the secret. Overwhelmed with excitement, Patrick urges Omri to bring loads of plastic people to life, while Omri protests that the people would be real, not toys to be played with. Nevertheless, Patrick uses the cupboard without Omri's knowledge, bringing to life the plastic cowboy, who turns out to be a man named Boone from an entirely different place and time as Little Bear. Over Omri's objections, Patrick introduces Boone to Little Bear. The two tiny men mistrust one another from the start, with Boone deriding Little Bear as "savage" and "dirty." The antagonism comes to a head when Omri and Patrick introduce the duo to television; when Boone cheers the slaughter of Native Americans in an old Western, Little Bear shoots him in the chest with an arrow.

Little Bear is immediately guilty, but does not know enough medicine to save Boone, while the boys are far too large to help. Omri brings to life the figure of a World War I medic, who turns out to be a man named Tommy Atkins from the trenches of France. Tommy, believing that this is a strange dream, saves Boone's life before being transported back through the cupboard. Little Bear continues to treat Boone's injuries, and the two gradually come to trust one another. This incident finally impresses upon Patrick that the tiny people are not toys. Though both boys have become attached to Boone and Little Bear, they agree to return everyone to their own time.

As chief, Little Bear demands a bride. Little Bear chooses from an array of plastic Native American figurines and Omri brings to life an Iroquois woman called Bright Stars (Twin Stars in some editions). The two boys and the tiny people have a final celebration, during which Boone becomes Little Bear's blood brother as does Omri, before the miniature people are sent home through the cupboard. Each boy keeps the now-plastic image of their friend as a memento, and Omri gives the cupboard's key back to his mother so that he will not be tempted to bring them back.

== Reception ==
The New York Times' 1981 review "BOOKS: Best for Children" called it the "best novel of the year". Kirkus Reviews observed, "The first book had a fine balance between childish desire to play with the tiny figures and awareness that, though small, they were real people who ought not to be so manipulated." Advocates for the book praise the novel on aspects of convincing characters, reader captivation and enchantment, and keeping in touch with young readers, among other things.

=== Awards ===
The Indian in the Cupboard has received several literary awards across the years and is becoming regarded as a classic in children's literature. A list of the awards received is as follows:

List of awards and nominations
Award	Year	Result
Pacific Northwest Young Readers Choice Award	1983	Won
California Young Reader Medal	1985	Won
Virginia Young Readers Program Award	1987	Won
Illinois Rebecca Caudill Young Readers Award	1988	Nominated
Massachusetts Children's Book Award	1988	Won
Arizona Young Readers Award	1989	Won

=== Criticism ===
The novel has been criticised for its portrayal and representation of Native Americans. At the 1991 American Library Association national conference, Naomi Caldwell-Wood and Lisa A. Mitten (former presidents of the American Indian Library Association) listed the book and its sequels under "Titles to avoid", calling them "classic examples of highly acclaimed books riddled with horrendous stereotypes of Native Americans. Banks has created her 'Indian' character from the mixed bag of harmful cliches so common among British authors". Similarly, Rhonda Harris Taylor explains that one aspect of controversy surrounding this novel is the "fact that the book's portrayal of Native Americans is seen as acceptable, implying its representations of American Indians as savages are the way American Indians are viewed in the mainstream," and that the role of Omri reinforces ideas of white paternalism. According to Freedom to Read, the book was challenged by a school board in Kamloops, British Columbia, and was temporarily removed from public libraries on the basis of the "potentially offensive treatment of native peoples." The book was reintroduced into libraries, but the title was placed on the list of challenged materials for teacher information. In 1992, Doris Seale, a Santee Dakota, Abenaki and Cree librarian, wrote, "My heart aches for the Native child unfortunate enough to stumble across, and read, these books. How could she, reading this, fail to be damaged? How could a white child fail to believe that he is far superior to the bloodthirsty, subhuman monsters portrayed here?"

== Sequels ==
=== The Return of the Indian (1985) ===
The second book in the series was published in paperback by Avon books, now an imprint of HarperCollins Publishers. It was a New York Times Notable Book. It was illustrated by Bill Geldart, William Coldart (UK), and Piers Sanford (US).

Omri and Patrick intervene aggressively in Little Bear's home world, Kirkus observed in contrast to the first book, noting "Feisty, likable characters and the precise logic by which Banks evolves events from her premises make this one of the better recent fantasies. Readers, enjoying the action and adventure, may also ponder its moral dilemmas."

==== Plot summary ====
A year after the events of the previous book, Omri wins first prize in a story-writing competition for his tale "The Plastic Indian", which is actually a recounting of his real adventures with the cupboard; everyone else assumes that Omri's story is fictional. Wanting to share his good news, Omri brings Little Bear and Twin Stars through the magic cupboard. Little Bear returns badly injured by the French soldiers he has been fighting in his own time. Omri attempts to bring back Tommy, the WWI field medic from the first book, but receives only Tommy's neatly folded uniform and medical bag, causing him to realize that Tommy was killed in the war.

Omri goes to Patrick for help. At first Patrick seems to have banished the memory of the tiny people from his mind, but then reluctantly shows Omri that he still carries the plastic figure of Boone in his pocket. Patrick's cousin Tamsin recently received a set of plastic medical figurines as a birthday gift, and the boys plan to borrow it and bring the whole group to life in the cupboard; however, Tamsin catches them taking the miniatures. Omri is able to slip one figure, a nurse, into his pocket.

Omri and Patrick put the nurse in the cupboard and bring her to life. The nurse, called Matron, believing she has dozed off while on duty, saves Little Bear's life. Matron also announces that Twin Stars is pregnant, and the boys decide that it would be safer to keep Bright Stars with them until after the baby is born, rather than return her to her war-torn village.

Patrick brings the cowboy Boone back to life through the cupboard in order to help Twin Stars care for Little Bear. Little Bear tells Boone about the troubles his people are suffering during their war with the French, and Boone wishes that he could somehow supply his friend with the "modern" six-shooters that are common in Boone's late-19th-century timeline. Patrick gets the idea to take plastic soldiers (with 20th century weaponry) back through the cupboard to Little Bear's time. Little Bear likes the idea of modern weapons, but refuses to bring English soldiers back to his village. Omri is reluctant, believing this amounts to meddling with history, but is won over by his desire to save Little Bear's people. The boys buy several more plastic Iroquois figures from the local shops and bring them all to life with the cupboard to serve as Little Bear's army. They also buy plastic miniatures of modern guns to give to the Iroquois, as well as a miniature Royal Marine figurine (who turns out to be a British corporal named Fickits) to instruct the Iroquois in their use.

After Little Bear and his troops are sent back, a casual comment by Boone prompts Omri and Patrick to wonder if it is the key which is magical, rather than the cupboard. Omri climbs into a large empty chest while holding Little Bear's plastic tipi and has Patrick turn the key. Omri finds himself looking through the eyes of one of the tipi's painted decorations, where he witnesses a group of Algonquins attacking Little Bear's village. The tipi is set on fire, but Patrick brings him back in the nick of time, only to find half Omri's hair singed off and his face blistered. Both Patrick and Omri are shaken, both by Omri's injuries and by the brutal reminder that Little Bear's time is real and dangerous.

That night, Patrick brings back the Iroquois army, only to find that they were completely unprepared for the use of modern weapons; their unfamiliarity with the power of the weapons results in them surrounding their enemies and shooting without realising how far the shots would travel, with some of them being shot by their own side by accident. Matron is able to save several lives but many are dead or dying. Little Bear feels ashamed of leading his troops into death, but Twin Stars is able to comfort him by showing off their newborn son, whom he names Tall Bear.

Later that night, while Patrick and Omri have the house to themselves, a trio of skinheads breaks in the house to burgle the family. Patrick and Omri bring back their Marine friend Fickits, along with a complement of troops, and set them loose on the skinheads, who are peppered by tiny machine-gun fire, causing them to flee. Omri's parents return and scold the boys for taking care of the burglars themselves rather than calling the police (Omri is also scolded for "playing with fire" and burning his face).

Before returning Little Bear and Twin Stars to their own time, Omri finally tells Little Bear about the prize-winning story, which was the reason Omri wanted to see Little Bear all along. Little Bear reflects that his son will be proud to know that his father will live on in Omri's story long after his death.

=== The Secret of the Indian (1989) ===
The third book in the series was illustrated at least by Graham Philpot (UK), Ted Lewin (US), and Piers Sanford (later).

==== Plot summary ====
Omri's school headmaster confronts Omri about his prize-winning story, believing that it might be true, as he had previously been shocked by these same "tiny people" on a day when Omri brought Little Bear to see his school. The headmaster threatens to get to the bottom of the mystery, causing Omri to fear that adults will learn the secret and use it to manipulate history.

Patrick agrees with Omri that it has become too dangerous to continue using the magic, but before they stop forever, Patrick deeply wants to travel back to Boone's time, just as Omri traveled to Little Bear's time in the previous book. Omri has grown ever more reluctant about using the key's magic powers to meddle with history, but he finally agrees to "hide" Patrick's true whereabouts in the large chest he has in his room. However, Patrick mistakenly keeps Boone's plastic figure in his pocket as Omri sends him into the past, causing Boone's real-life body to be knocked unconscious while Boone is now "brought forward" in his miniature form. Trapped in Patrick's pocket, Boone nearly smothers before Omri, with Matron's help, revives him.

Patrick arrives in the Wild West miniaturized and trapped inside Boone's pocket, while the now full-sized Boone is sprawled unconscious and alone on the open prairie. Patrick manages to "ride" Boone's giant horse to a nearby town, where the horse stops out of habit at a local saloon. Tiny Patrick flags the attention of a dancing girl named Ruby Lou, who is curious but unafraid of the tiny boy, and who also happens to be a close friend of Boone's. With Patrick's help, she and the saloon piano player carry Boone back to town and deliver him to the local doctor, who simply believes Boone is drunk. However, they are all in danger when a sudden storm spawns a tornado that tears apart the doctor's office.

After the battle in the last book, many tiny injured Iroquois remain in Omri's room under Matron's care. Matron is exhausted and at the end of her skills and strength. Boone is also badly injured. Omri decides to make a second attempt to steal Tamsin's plastic medical set, but is caught by Tamsin's sister Emma. Omri is forced to tell her about the key's magic power and the desperate situation in his bedroom. Emma agrees to borrow the medical set for him and to keep silent about the magic, on the condition that she be allowed to bring to life a plastic person of her own. By chance, the figurine she selects is that of Ruby Lou. Thanks to the toys Emma provides, Matron is able to get a surgical team that saves the Iroquois and Boone.

Omri uses the trunk to bring Patrick back to the present and at the same time return the Iroquois to the past, but returning Patrick inadvertently drags the tornado back to Omri's room, destroying part of the house and neighborhood. In the chaos, the cupboard is damaged and the key lost. Omri's headmaster, who has been lurking outside the house hoping to catch evidence of Omri's secret, is struck on the head by debris, meaning that no one believes any of his ramblings about "tiny people."

Boone and Ruby Lou realise they are stranded as tiny people in the far future, unable to return home without the key. They attempt to make a life with one another, eventually confessing their love. They are resigned to their fate, but long to return home and be properly married.

Omri's father repairs the cupboard and returns it to his son, while Omri, by sheer luck, finds the key in a hedge. He uses the magic to summon all of the group's tiny friends for Boone and Ruby Lou's wedding before sending everyone home for what he promises will be the final time. Afterwards Omri asks his parents for a safe-deposit box, into which he puts the key, the cupboard, the figurines of Little Bear and his family, and a copy of his story, leaving them for his children to find.

=== The Mystery of the Cupboard (1993) ===
This book was illustrated by Piers Sanford (UK) and Tom Newsom (US). HarperCollins recommends its 2004 edition for ages 8 to 12. Kirkus Reviews recommended it for ages 10 to 13 in 1993, concluding, "Not the best Cupboard book, but fans won't want to miss it; with a first printing of 75,000 they won't have to."

Kirkus observed that "Banks plots expertly" and develops the relationship between Omri and his father. "There's not much chance to stereotype Native Americans here, as Banks was charged with earlier, but Jessica Charlotte is certainly a caricature of a music-hall singer; one wonders whether it's reasonable, or merely foolish, to deplore such shorthand in popular fiction."

==== Plot summary ====
With their house in ruins after the freak tornado in the previous book, Omri and family move temporarily to rural Dorset, where they have inherited a house from the family of Jessica Charlotte Driscoll, Omri's "wicked" great-great aunt, who became the family black sheep by being a charlatan fortune-teller, a scandalous dance-hall girl, and a thief. While the cottage's roof is being rethatched, the workmen discover a metal box and give it to Omri, telling him that the previous owners of old cottages frequently hid their deedboxes in thatched roofs.

Along with the deedbox is a journal called "The Account," written by Jessica Charlotte herself as she was dying of a fatal illness. Jessica possesses a power called the Gift, which she uses to read the future by pouring lead into water and interpreting the shapes it makes. After her sister, scandalized by Jessica's lifestyle, forbids her from ever seeing her precious niece Lottie (Omri's maternal grandmother who was killed in the Blitz during World War II), Jessica takes revenge by stealing her sister's valuable earrings. To do so she makes a duplicate of the jewel-case key out of lead, but accidentally imbues it with magical power through her own Gift. This allows the Key to open any lock. Lottie is accused of stealing the earrings and runs out into the street where her father follows her, resulting in him being killed by a passing carriage.

At this point in the Account, Jessica grows too weak to continue. Omri's great-uncle Fredrick takes over. Fredrick was a toymaker who created miniatures from metal and who detested the cheap, ugly plastic toys that had come to replace old-fashioned metal toys. He also possessed some of Jessica's magical abilities. Jessica had him create the cupboard, which he imbues with his hatred of plastic toys. This caused the cupboard to only bring plastic toys to life, which is why no other materials ever worked when Omri tried them in the cupboard.

Omri meets one of the thatchers who worked on the roof when Jessica was dying, a man named Tom, and learns from him that Jessica let him in on the secret. She also gave him a little person to care for, a servant girl named Jenny from the 1800s who sought to escape her home life after she lost her position. After having lived as a little person for thirty years, she had died a few months before.

Omri suspects that the stolen earrings are in the deedbox he found with the Account and realises that the magic key could open it. He returns to his old town, telling his parents that he wants to visit Patrick, but really to retrieve the key from the safe-deposit box. Omri opens the deedbox and finds five wrapped bundles, four of whom are people brought to life by the magic key. The people turn out to be Elsie, a widowed shop owner; Bert, a thief from Elsie's time; and Ted, a retired policeman. The final person, Sergeant Charlie Ellis, was a naval officer killed at the Battle of Trafalgar; his bundle contains only his uniform. These new people reveal that Jessica knew of the power of the key and the cupboard but only found out when she accidentally brought them to life for the first time. She brought them back and forth many times, just as Omri did with Little Bear. Just before she died, she told them all that they were being sent back for the final time and wished them goodbye. Jenny, however, lived such a wretched life in the past that she begged to be allowed to remain. Jessica entrusted Jenny's care to Tom.

Omri learns that Bert is the thief who stole his great-grandmother's jewellery box after her husband had died, leaving her destitute. Bert had no idea that he was robbing a woman of her only valuables and promises Omri that he will return the jewellery box in the past in hopes of changing the future for the better. Omri then sends them one final time through the cupboard.

Omri believes that the final bundle must contain the missing earrings, but in fact, it contains another tiny person, fast asleep. Before he can investigate further, he is called to Tom's home. Tom has fallen from the roof and is on the verge of death, but asked for Omri to tell him the final secret: before she died, Jessica had him search for a plastic figure of herself. He bought dozens of figurines before finally finding the right one. Jessica kept the figure of herself but told him to take care of the other plastic figures, saying, "This is me, but everyone is someone."

Omri and his father head home, bringing Patrick along. Omri explains that he's figured out the identity of the final person he brought to life: Jessica Charlotte herself, just after creating the key. Omri wants to convince her not to take the earrings, but Patrick tells him that doing so could change his own family history and possibly result in Omri never being born. Remembering that he convinced Bert to return the jewellery case, Omri worries that it will cause him to cease to exist. Omri and Patrick convince the newly woken tiny Jessica that this is all a dream before returning her to her own past.

Omri asks his mother how she originally came by the key. She tells him that key came from her great-grandmother's jewellery box, which was stolen and returned empty. Omri realizes that Bert only said he would return the jewel-case without specifying that the jewels would still be in it. This is the same story his mother told him about the key when she first gave it to him, and Omri realizes this means history has not been changed.

A week later Omri attends Tom's funeral, where he meets Tom's daughter, who is wearing the long-lost earrings. Omri realizes that Jessica gave the earrings to Tom, who gave them to his daughter without knowing they were stolen. Having solved the mystery, he decides not to tell Tom's daughter the story of the earrings.

Omri returns home to find that his father, while rebuilding Omri's bedroom, found the key, the cupboard, and the plastic figure of Little Bear and locked the toy in the cupboard, where he was shocked when Little Bear came to life. He has since been too frightened to open the cupboard while Little Bear called for Omri from inside. Realizing that his father must be let in on the secret, the story ends with Omri opening the cupboard to introduce Little Bear to his father.

=== The Key to the Indian (1998) ===
This book was illustrated by Piers Sanford (UK) and James Watling (US). HarperCollins recommends its 2004 edition for ages 8 to 12.

==== Plot summary ====
Omri and his father learn that Little Bear needs their help as American colonists are starting to head into his people's land. The two realise that they must travel back in time and lend their aid but need to figure out how to do it. They have the key, but they need something big enough to hold them. Omri's dad decides to use the car as the time machine and comes up with an elaborate plan to pretend to go on a camping trip as a cover for their time travel, but they realise that the key won't work in the car. Omri tells his father what he learned and shows him the Account.

After reading that, Omri's dad figures out that Jessica Charlotte could possibly create a magical copy of the car key so they can travel back in time. The two also figure out that Omri has inherited some of her psychic power and that's most likely why he can tell when one of his friends from the past needs his help. It gives Omri the power to sense various things, like figuring out what's going on with Jessica in her time even though she was so weak at this point when she wrote the Account that only a few words can be made out: she's learned that her brother-in law has died and is going to try to drown herself. The two feel that they must bring her forward no matter what. She's drowned herself and isn't breathing so Omri summons Matron, who revives her. When she hears that he's Lottie's grandson, she agrees to make a magical copy of the car key. He brings his father, and they give her the key and send her back. That night, they summon Little Bear to get something of his to use to travel back, and he gives them his wampum belt. He also agrees to have Bright Stars make toys for them to travel into when they journey to the past.

The next day, Omri's father summons Jessica Charlotte without him and she returns the original car key and gives them the copy, but the scale difference means that the key is too small to see and is useless. They decide to go camping anyway and bring Gillon, but Omri has an ivory elephant from India and Gillon is leaning against a knapsack from that time also and they suddenly find themselves in India about 90 years before. Omri figures out that Jessica Charlotte's attempt to create the magical copy of the car key where she bent her entire will on it probably caused the original car key to become magical. He figures his father will realise what happened and bring them back by shutting off the car. During the trip, Omri and Gillon are marionettes, and a couple of children spot them moving on their own and try to show them off. They are pulled back to their time, where Omri finds that they never left the house as the father got pulled back to Little Bear's time due to the wampum belt being in his pocket and they were pulled back when Omri's mother found them and shut off the car, fearing they were dead. Omri's father ended up in a faceless doll, but Little Bear promised that next time the dolls would have faces.

The two head to the top of a nearby hill and time travel from there. They summon Patrick to send them there and back, but Patrick is unhappy that he won't be going until he realises that he has the cupboard and can call any of their friends back. He sends them back, and they meet up with Little Bear and advise to take his tribe to Canada. They are then attacked by two settlers who set fire to the longhouse and start killing Indians. Old Clan Woman, the oldest and wisest member of the tribe, scares them off with Omri and his father's help, but she is killed by the two retreating men. Little Bear and his tribe escape and start the trek to Canada, but Omri and his father are forgotten in the rush. They escape outside but are trapped in the stockade, and the two men return and go to kill them. Before they can succeed, Little Bear returns, having remembered them, and kills the two men and rescues them. He also retrieves a false face mask from the longhouse. He apologises for leaving them behind and is ashamed as Omri is his blood brother. He tells Omri he is no longer a boy: Omri is now a warrior. He leaves the two a moccasin to use as a shelter until Patrick brings them back in the morning and leaves after saying a final goodbye.

The next morning, they are returned to their time by Patrick, who explains that he brought Boone and Ruby Lou but lost them. They eventually find them in a septic tank and rescue and clean them up. Patrick also reveals that he planned to bring Little Bear to the present while they were away, but Sergeant Fickits convinced him not to. A couple of weeks later, Omri's mother brings him the wampum belt and he realises that she knows the truth. She reveals that she, like Omri, has inherited some of Jessica Charlotte's psychic powers and, seeming to read his mind, explains that she's known the truth since the beginning but has kept it to herself. They agree that it is time to end the adventures for good. Omri closes his figures and the magical car key in the cashbox and decides to give the magic key back to his mother so he will no longer have the temptation to use it. He first sends the wampum belt back and senses through his psychic powers that Little Bear and his tribe have reached Canada and reveals this to his father along with the fact that his mother knows the truth. However, an apparently psychic dream indicates that perhaps he will have further adventures.
