= Sarah and After =

1975 book by Lynne Reid Banks

- Author: Lynne Reid Banks
- Language: English
- Genre: Fiction
- Published: 1975
- Publisher: The Bodley Head
- Publication place: United Kingdom
- Media type: Print (hardback, paperback)
- Pages: 169 pages
- ISBN: 0370109538 First edition, UK
- OCLC: 1551694

Sarah and After: the matriarchs is a 1975 collection of short stories aimed at older juvenile readers, written by Lynne Reid Banks. Each of the stories in the collection focus on a different woman in the Bible, beginning with Sarah, wife to Abraham and mother to Isaac.

== Synopsis ==
The collection is made up of several stories, each of which center upon a different woman in the Bible. These women include Sarah, Rebecca, Leah and Rachel, and Dinah. The stories are written from each woman's perspective with the exception of Rachel, who is covered through Leah's story. Others covered via other stories include Hagar.

== Development ==
In an interview with The Daily Telegraph, Banks noted that she gave the women more modern sensibilities as she wanted to make it easier for her intended readers, teenage girls, to identify with and understand what it was like to be a woman in biblical times. She also wanted to show "how God-driven men, preoccupied with their vocation, can exploit their women".

== Themes ==
Themes and topics in the stories of Sarah and After center upon women's lives and identities, as well as themes of anti-patriarchy. The men and women in the stories are emphasized as "people of passion and fallibility", which Zena Sutherland wrote was shown through the motivations and justifications the characters give to themselves.

== Publication ==
Sarah and After: the matriarchs was first published in the United Kingdom in 1975 through The Bodley Head in hardback. That same year the collection was also published in hardback in the United States via Doubleday, under the title Sarah and After: five women who founded a nation. A paperback version was released in the United Kingdom during 1981, through Lion Publishing.

== Reception ==
Critical reception for the collection was favorable, with journalists for The Birmingham Post and Herald Express praising Banks for her portrayal of the Biblical women. Sutherland, in a review for the Chicago Tribune, wrote that "the fiction adheres rather closely; what Banks adds can deepen the reader's understanding of the women as people."

Leon Garfield for The Guardian was more critical, praising Banks for her "motives in bringing back the Bible into the world's imagination" while also criticizing the collection as not treating the characters and subject with enough respect and reverence.
