= Who's on First (novel) =

1980 novel by William F. Buckley Jr.

- First edition book cover
- Author: William F. Buckley Jr.
- Language: English
- Series: Blackford Oakes
- Genre: Spy thriller, espionage
- Publisher: Doubleday
- Publication date: 1980
- Publication place: United States
- Media type: Print, 8vo
- Pages: 275 pp
- ISBN: 9780385146814
- Preceded by: Stained Glass
- Followed by: Marco Polo, if You Can

Who's on First is a 1980 American spy thriller novel written by William F. Buckley Jr., the third of eleven novels in the Blackford Oakes series.

== Plot ==
CIA agent Blackford Oakes is sent to Hungary amid the Hungarian Uprising of 1956.
