= A Very Private Plot =

1994 novel by William F. Buckley, Jr.

- First edition cover
- Author: William F. Buckley, Jr.
- Language: English
- Series: Blackford Oakes
- Subject: Military, spy fiction
- Published: 1994
- Publisher: Morrow
- Pages: 272 pp
- ISBN: 9780688127954
- OCLC: 28721356
- Preceded by: Tucker's Last Stand
- Followed by: Last Call for Blackford Oakes

A Very Private Plot is a 1994 historical spy novel by William F. Buckley, Jr. It is the tenth of 11 novels in the Blackford Oakes series. The novel was well received by The New York Times, which described it as full of "grave whimsy with which Mr. Buckley retraces old conflicts" and "deliver[ing] more than mere routine spy thrills".

== Plot ==
In early 1995, CIA agent Blackford Oakes is called to testify before the United States Congress regarding a suspected plot to assassinate Mikhail Gorbachev, president of the Soviet Union.
