= My Name Is Legion (short story collection) =

Short story collection by Roger Zelazny

- Cover of first edition (paperback)
- Author: Roger Zelazny
- Cover artist: The Brothers Hildebrandt
- Language: English
- Genre: Science fiction
- Publisher: Ballantine Books
- Publication date: 1976
- Publication place: United States
- Media type: Print (paperback)
- Pages: 213 pp
- ISBN: 0-345-24867-8
- OCLC: 1976128
- Dewey Decimal: 813/.5/4
- LC Class: PS3576.E43 M9

My Name Is Legion is a collection of three science fiction stories by American writer Roger Zelazny, published in 1976. The stories feature a common protagonist who is never named.

== Background ==
The protagonist of these stories is involved in the creation of a global computer network designed to give ultimate economic control by tracking all human activity. Just before the system goes live, the hero expresses concerns about the possible misuse of such power to his superior, who gives him a chance to destroy his personal data before it is entered into the system. In taking this step, the hero becomes non-existent as far as the system is concerned. Using backdoors in the central network, the hero is able to create identities for himself as needed. With this freedom, he establishes himself as a freelance investigator and problem solver.

== Stories ==
The following stories are included in the book:

- The Eve of RUMOKO — Project RUMOKO is a plan to use nuclear explosives to create artificial islands; the hero must identify and stop a saboteur on the project.
- Kjwalll'kje'k'koothai'lll'kje'k — At a research station in the Bahamas a diver has died, apparently in an attack by a dolphin, but dolphins do not attack humans, and someone suspects foul play.
- Home Is the Hangman — A sentient space-exploration robot, lost years before, has apparently returned to Earth. One of its original designers has died under suspicious circumstances. Has the Hangman returned to kill its creators? The hero must find the Hangman and stop it, and time is running out. This story won the 1976 Hugo Award for Best Novella.

== See also ==
- Surveillance capitalism
- Government surveillance
- Mass surveillance
