= The L-Shaped Room (novel) =

Book by Lynne Reid Banks

- Cover of the first edition
- Author: Lynne Reid Banks
- Cover artist: Una Bishop
- Language: English
- Genre: Bildungsroman
- Publisher: Chatto & Windus
- Publication date: 1960
- Publication place: United Kingdom
- Media type: Print (hardcover and paperback)
- Pages: 269 pp (Paperback)

Reid Banks discusses the novel's heroine
from the BBC programme Bookclub, 6 June 2010.

The L-Shaped Room is a 1960 British novel by Lynne Reid Banks which tells the story of a young woman, unmarried and pregnant, who moves into a London boarding house, befriending a young man in the building. It was adapted into a film, with significant differences from the novel, by Bryan Forbes.

== Synopsis ==
The L-Shaped Room is set in the late 1950s and follows a young woman, Jane Graham, who arrives alone at a run-down boarding house in London after being turned out of her comfortable middle class home by her shocked father after telling him she is pregnant.

The L-Shaped room is the dingy room at the top of the boarding house that Jane retreats to, to wallow in her miseries. Jane narrates the story as we follow her through her pregnancy and her encounters with the other residents of the boarding house, all misfits and outsiders. Jane got pregnant through a bungled sexual encounter, losing her virginity to her ex-boyfriend. Her decision to live by herself and have the baby causes her to be seen as little better than the prostitutes who live in the basement of the boarding house.

== See also ==
- Bedsit
