= A Woman Called Moses =

1978 American television miniseries

- Based on: A Woman Called Moses by Marcy Heidish
- Written by: Lonne Elder III
- Directed by: Paul Wendkos
- Starring: Cicely Tyson
- Narrated by: Orson Welles
- Music by: Coleridge-Taylor Perkinson
- Country of origin: United States
- Original language: English

Production
- Producers: Michael Jaffe; Ike Jones
- Cinematography: Robert B. Hauser
- Editors: Stanley Frazen; Frank Mazzola; Elio Zarmati
- Running time: 240 minutes

Original release
- Network: NBC
- Release: December 11 – December 12, 1978

A Woman Called Moses is a 1978 American television miniseries based on the novel of the same name by Marcy Heidish. Adapted for television by Lonne Elder III, the miniseries is about the life of Harriet Tubman, the escaped African American slave who led dozens of other African Americans from enslavement in the Southern United States to freedom in the Northern states and Canada.

Narrated by Orson Welles, the production was broadcast on the NBC television network on December 11 and 12, 1978. Tubman was portrayed by Cicely Tyson. The production is notable for being one of the earliest dramatizations of Harriet Tubman's life.

== Music ==
The soundtrack music was by Coleridge-Taylor Perkinson and soul music composer/arranger/singer Van McCoy contributed some music to the series, which was featured on a soundtrack album released by MCA Records.

== Cast ==
- Cicely Tyson - Harriet Tubman
- Will Geer - Thomas Garrett
- Robert Hooks - William Still
- James Wainwright - Andrew Coleman
- Jason Bernard - Daddy Ben Ross
- Clifford David - Doc Thompson
- Judyann Elder - Bernette Wilson
- John Getz - Stewart
- Mae Mercer - Aunt Juba
- Hari Rhodes - Tavwell Robinson
- James Sikking - McCracken
- Charles Weldon - Shadrack Davis
- Dick Anthony Williams - John Tubman
- Orson Welles - Narrator

== Video releases ==
The miniseries was first released on VHS on September 29, 1992, followed by a DVD release on February 3, 2001. A Xenon Pictures, Walmart exclusive Blu-ray release was issued on January 15, 2019.

== See also ==
- List of films featuring slavery
- The Quest for Freedom, 1992 film about Harriet Tubman
- Harriet, 2019 film about Tubman
