= The L-Shaped Room =

1962 British film by Bryan Forbes

- Theatrical release poster
- Directed by: Bryan Forbes
- Screenplay by: Bryan Forbes
- Based on: The L-Shaped Room by Lynne Reid Banks
- Produced by: Richard Attenborough; Jack Rix; James Woolf
- Starring: Leslie Caron; Tom Bell; Bernard Lee; Brock Peters; Cicely Courtneidge; Patricia Phoenix; Emlyn Williams
- Cinematography: Douglas Slocombe
- Edited by: Anthony Harvey
- Music by: John Barry
- Production company: Romulus Films
- Distributed by: British Lion Films
- Release date: 20 November 1962
- Running time: 126 minutes
- Country: United Kingdom
- Language: English
- Box office: $1 million (US/Canada rentals)

The L-Shaped Room is a 1962 British drama romance film written and directed by Bryan Forbes, based on the 1960 novel by Lynne Reid Banks. It tells the story of Jane Fosset, a young French woman, unmarried and pregnant, who moves into a cheap London boarding house, befriending a young man, Toby, in the building. The work is considered part of the kitchen sink realism school of British drama. The film reflected a trend in British films of greater frankness about sex and displays a sympathetic treatment of outsiders "unmarried mothers, lesbian or black" as well as a "largely natural and non-judgmental handling of their problems". As director, Forbes represents "a more romantic, wistful type of realism" than that of Tony Richardson or Lindsay Anderson.

Leslie Caron's performance earned her a Golden Globe Award for Best Actress and a BAFTA Award for Best Actress, as well as a nomination for the Academy Award for Best Actress.

Cicely Courtneidge gave what she considered her finest film performance, in a role wholly unlike her usual parts; she played Mavis, an elderly lesbian, living in a drab London flat with her cat, recalling her career as an actress and forlornly trying to keep in touch with former friends. The Times described her performance as a triumph. For Tom Bell, the film marked his breakthrough as a leading actor in film and television.

== Plot ==
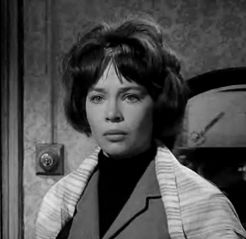
Leslie Caron in the film

A 27-year-old French woman, Jane Fosset, arrives alone at a run down boarding house in Notting Hill, London, moving into an L-shaped room in the attic. Beautiful but withdrawn, she encounters the residents of her house, each a social outsider in his or her own way, including Johnny, a gay, black trumpeter.

Jane is pregnant and has no desire to marry the father Terry. On her first visit to Dr. Weaver, she wants to find out if she really is pregnant and consider her options. Dr. Weaver's assumption that she must want either marriage or an abortion annoys her to the extent that Jane determines to have the child. She and fellow boarder Toby start a romance which is disrupted when he learns that she is pregnant by Terry, her previous lover. They try to work things out but he is also unhappy with his lack of income or success as a writer.

Jane befriends the other residents and they help her when she goes into labour. Toby visits her in hospital and gives her a copy of his new story, called "The L-Shaped Room". After leaving hospital, Jane journeys home to her parents in France, saying goodbye to the room where she has lived for seven months.

== Cast ==
- Leslie Caron as Jane Fosset
- Tom Bell as Toby Coleman Cohen
- Brock Peters as Johnny
- Cicely Courtneidge as Mavis
- Bernard Lee as Charlie
- Patricia Phoenix as Sonia
- Emlyn Williams as Dr. Weaver
- Avis Bunnage as Doris
- Gerry Duggan as Bert
- Mark Eden as Terry
- Anthony Booth as youth in street
- Harry Locke as newsagent
- Gerald Sim as doctor in hospital
- Nanette Newman as girl at end

== Music ==
Peter Katin's recording of Johannes Brahms's Piano Concerto No. 1 in D minor, Op. 15 with orchestra conducted by Muir Mathieson is used as the background music, and excerpts occur frequently throughout the film. The original film score for the jazz club scene was composed by John Barry.

== Reception ==
The Monthly Film Bulletin wrote: "Although it is full of the trappings of contemporary frustration ... the film has nothing specific to say about life in a London bedsitter in 1962. Despite his cogently amusing dialogue, Bryan Forbes' rather capricious direction makes this only too clear quite early on, for after a brilliantly authentic piece of scene setting, with the unseen landlady's spine-chilling small talk on the stairs and the lights going out on each landing of the hideous house, he disappointingly spills over into melodrama – bugs in the bed, bangings on the wall, black face at the window. ... Moreover, neither direction nor script is ever tough enough to succeed in suggesting loneliness, and Forbes' obvious talent (and preference) for drawing likeable performances from his actors tends to work against him. Avis Bunnage's unpredictable landlady, Cicely Courtneidge's self-contained old trouper, Patricia Phoenix's gregarious prostitute ... are all "characters". Emlyn Williams' unprincipled gynaecologist is a cardboard villain. On the other hand, Leslie Caron has never been more appealing ... and Tom Bell exactly hits off frustrated attitudes of a would-be intellectual who cannot afford a bottle of non-vintage wine, let alone a wife with child. Indeed, when the film is soberly engaged in telling a simple, romantic story, it does achieve a certain assurance as well as considerable charm. There are scenes, like the one when Toby fails to turn up at the café, when music, camerawork and acting pull together on a genuinely elegiac note. In this context, too, one likes the film for its inherent wholesomeness."

In The New York Times, Bosley Crowther wrote "[Leslie Caron] pours into this role so much powerful feeling, so much heart and understanding, that she imbues a basically threadbare little story with tremendous compassion and charm. The credit, however, is not all Miss Caron's. She must share it with an excellent cast, including Tom Bell, a new actor who plays the writer on a par with her. Particularly she must share it with the remarkable young director Bryan Forbes, who also wrote the screenplay from a novel by Lynne Reid Banks. Mr Forbes is a sometime actor whose first directorial job was last year's beautiful and sensitive Whistle Down the Wind. In this little picture, he has achieved much the same human quality, with shadings of spiritual devotion, as in that."

== Accolades ==
- Nominee, Best Actress – Academy Awards (Leslie Caron)
- Winner, Best Actress – Golden Globes (Leslie Caron)
- Winner, Best British Actress – BAFTAs (Leslie Caron)
- Nominee, Best British Film – BAFTAs (Richard Attenborough, Jack Rix, John and James Woolf)
- Nominee, Best Film from Any Source – BAFTAs
- Selected, Top Ten Films of the Year – National Board of Review
- Nominee, Best Actress – New York Film Critics Circle (Leslie Caron)

== Home media ==
The film was restored and issued on DVD and Blu-ray in 2017; extras include later interviews with Caron and Reid Banks.

== Popular culture ==
A recording of the song "Take Me Back to Dear Old Blighty" sung in the film by Cicely Courtneidge was sampled at the beginning of the title track of the 1986 album The Queen Is Dead by The Smiths.
