= The Story of Henri Tod =

1984 novel by William F. Buckley, Jr.

- First edition
- Author: William F. Buckley, Jr.
- Language: English
- Series: Blackford Oakes
- Genre: Spy novel
- Published: 1984
- Publisher: Doubleday
- Publication place: United States
- Media type: Print
- Pages: 254 pp
- ISBN: 978-0-3851-5234-1
- OCLC: 9829510
- Dewey Decimal: 813.54
- LC Class: PS3552.U344
- Preceded by: Marco Polo, if You Can
- Followed by: See You Later, Alligator

The Story of Henri Tod is a 1984 Blackford Oakes novel by William F. Buckley, Jr. It is the fifth of 11 novels in the series.

== Plot ==
CIA agent Blackford Oakes is sent to West Berlin East Germany in 1961, during the time leading up to the building of the Berlin Wall.

Henri Tod is a German Jew who during World War II is sent to England to prevent his conscription into the army. After the war he returns to Germany and becomes Germany's leading Freedom fighter. Henri Tod carries a burden of guilt because while in England he told someone of his sister who was still hiding on a farm in Germany. This information gets back to the Death Squads who kill the foster parents and send his sister, Clementa, to the death camps. His sister is rescued from Auschwitz at the last minute by the Soviet armies, but after the war becomes a pawn in an East Block effort to secure Tod's capture. Thrown into this mix of lively characters is a curious East German couple that play crucial roles in the tableau. Of historical interest is their secret meeting place, a relic German railcar, that once belonged to Adolf Hitler. And, of course there's Blackford Oakes. Oakes's mission is to infiltrate the Bruderschaft (Tod's organization) in an effort to learn of its intentions. All this occurs, of course, during the days leading up to the building of the Berlin Wall.
