= Night Chills =

1976 novel by Dean Koontz

- First edition
- Author: Dean Koontz
- Cover artist: Paul Bacon
- Language: English
- Genre: Suspense, horror
- Publisher: Atheneum Books
- Publication date: 1976
- Publication place: United States
- Media type: Print (Paperback)
- Pages: 334 pp
- ISBN: 0-689-10660-2

Night Chills is a suspense-horror novel by American writer Dean Koontz, originally published in 1976. It largely deals with the theme of mind control and is noted as one of Koontz's most graphic and violent works.

== Plot summary ==
Widower Paul Annendale has taken his two children, Rya and Mark, on their annual camping vacation to the small New England town of Black River. What no one there knows is that the town has become a testing ground for a new experiment involving techniques related to subliminal advertising. Developed by amoral scientist Ogden Salsbury and funded by multi-millionaire Leonard Dawson, this newly discovered technique was introduced into the town with the aid of a chemical in the water supply, and allows anyone with a special code phrase to gain total mind control of an exposed subject. Together with local store owner Sam Edison, Paul intends to put a stop to this illegal conspiracy.

== Main characters ==
- Paul Annendale
- Rya Annendale
- Mark Annendale
- Ogden Salsbury
- Leonard Dawson
- Ernst Klinger
- Sam Edison
- Jenny Edison
- Brenda Macklin
- Emma Thorp
- Bob Thorp
- Jeremy Thorp
- Buddy Pellineri
- Pauline Vicker
- Phil Karkov
- Lolah Tayback
