= A Woman Called Moses (novel) =

1976 novel by Marcy Heidish

- Author: Marcy Heidish
- Language: English
- Genre: Historical fiction
- Publisher: Houghton Mifflin
- Publication date: 1976
- Publication place: United States
- Media type: Print
- Pages: 308
- ISBN: 978-0-395-21535-7

A Woman Called Moses is the 1976 debut novel of American author Marcy Heidish. It is a fictionalized presentation of the early life of black American abolitionist Harriet Tubman. The novel received positive reviews, but was criticized by some academics as historically inaccurate. In 1978 it was adapted as a two-part miniseries, also titled A Woman Called Moses.

== Synopsis ==
Two years after the American Civil War, Harriet Tubman recalls her life in slavery in the pre-war Southern United States, her escape from bondage, and her subsequent efforts to free other enslaved people.

== Reception ==
The novel received positive responses from reviewers. A review in The Boston Globe called it "vivid and dramatic". The reviewer for The Tennessean said it was "full of compelling storytelling". Other reviews called it "evocative", "enjoyable and enlightening reading", and "a novel of superior quality".

Some historians were more critical of the book, saying its portrayal of Tubman was not accurate. James A. McGowan, the editor of the Harriet Tubman Journal, called the novel a "deliberate distortion". McGowan and others were especially critical of Heidish's portrayal of the very religious Tubman drinking, swearing, and engaging in pre-marital sex.

== Adaptation ==
In 1978 the novel was adapted into a two-part television miniseries, also titled A Woman Called Moses. The adaptation aired on NBC on December 11 and 12. Cicely Tyson starred as Tubman.
