= Blackford Oakes =

- First appearance: Saving the Queen
- Last appearance: Last Call for Blackford Oakes
- Created by: William F. Buckley, Jr.

In-universe information
- Gender: Male
- Occupation: Spy
- Affiliation: Central Intelligence Agency
- Nationality: American

Blackford "Blackie"/"Black" Oakes is a fictional character, a Central Intelligence Agency officer, spy and the protagonist of a series of novels written by William F. Buckley, Jr.

== Early life ==
Oakes was born in 1925. He served in World War II as a fighter pilot and graduated from Yale University. Oakes is an engineer by training (at one point in the series, he is hired by an architectural firm), and Anthony Trust, ahead of Black at both Greyburn and Yale, recruits him for the Central Intelligence Agency in his senior year, 1951.

At Yale, Blackford is older than most of his classmates due to his military service. Reference is made to his membership on both the swimming and lacrosse teams there, and he is a member of Zeta Psi fraternity. Sally Partridge, a Vassar graduate, is his main love interest throughout the series. Their fateful meeting and Blackford's courtship of Sally is detailed in Mongoose, R.I.P.

== Central Intelligence Agency ==
Blackford's missions with the CIA involve various top-secret Cold War enterprises arranged by the Agency's highest ranking individuals and American presidents alike. Oakes possesses the ability to impress his colleagues, superiors (among them John F. Kennedy and Ronald Reagan), and even his enemies with his easy-going competence and likability.

== Personal life ==
Oakes' personal life is somewhat hectic because of his constant globetrotting for the Agency, as he can never seem to find ample time to settle down with Sally, who yearns for the day when Blackford will retire from the CIA. Their respective worldviews are quite dissimilar, Oakes being conservative, and Sally, a liberal feminist who studied and teaches Jane Austen and admires Adlai Stevenson. While not only disliking Blackford's chosen profession because it so often spoils their plans, Sally also disapproves of many of the ideals she believes the CIA represents.

While always holding Sally close to his heart, Oakes still finds plenty of time to pursue romantic conquests across the globe, often mixing work with pleasure. He is a suave, intelligent, and confident gentleman who is, in Buckley's own words, distinctly American, and it is no surprise he succeeds in both work and play.

In "Saving the Queen," Blackford's address in 1975 is listed as 3025 P Street, NW.

Blackford is an avid reader of National Review but rarely offers insight into the state of domestic politics and world affairs.

== Characteristics ==
Throughout the series, Blackford proves himself to be the ultimate Cold War warrior, and risks his life for the country he loves countless times, while looking smooth doing it.

Though Oakes is widely regarded as a gentleman, and at times, a charmer, he also has a rebellious streak in the face of unduly harsh authority. Blackford demonstrates this rebelliousness throughout the series, beginning with an incident involving the administration of Greyburn Academy, which Blackford briefly attends as a schoolboy.

== In literature ==
1. Saving the Queen (1976) – Set in 1952. Oakes' first mission. He goes to England looking for a British double agent.
2. Stained Glass (1979) – Set in autumn 1952 following his first mission through November 1953. Oakes is sent to keep tabs on a German politician who is trying to unify East and West Germany against the wishes of both American and Soviet intelligence agencies.
3. High Jinx (1986) – Set in 1954. Oakes works behind the scenes to avoid an internal Soviet power struggle that could lead to a Stalin protégé gaining in power in Moscow.
4. Who's on First (1980) – Set in 1956 during the space race and uprising in Hungary.
5. Marco Polo, If You Can (1982) – Set in 1960. Oakes is captured while flying a Lockheed U-2 aircraft over Soviet airspace.
6. See You Later, Alligator (1985) – Set in Cuba in the early 1961, Oakes meets Che Guevara and tries to ease tensions between Cuba and America after the Bay of Pigs incident.
7. The Story of Henri Tod (1984) – Set in 1961. Oakes is in Germany during the Berlin Wall crisis.
8. Mongoose R.I.P. (1987) – Set in 1963. Oakes is in Cuba working to overthrow Castro after the Cuban Missile Crisis.
9. Tucker's Last Stand (1990) – Set in 1964. Oakes is in Vietnam to cut off Viet Cong supply lines.
10. A Very Private Plot (1994) – Oakes in 1995 is called to testify about operations he conducted in the 1980s, especially one in particular involving a domestic Soviet plot to assassinate Mikhail Gorbachev.
11. Last Call for Blackford Oakes (2005) – Set in 1987, Oakes confronts the infamous Soviet defector, Kim Philby.

=== Other ===
- The Blackford Oakes Reader (1999) – A book in which William F. Buckley explains the character and the novels.
