= Shadrach in the Furnace =

1976 novel by Robert Silverberg

- First edition cover
- Author: Robert Silverberg
- Cover artist: Fred Samperi
- Language: English
- Genre: Science fiction
- Publisher: New York: Bobbs-Merrill, 1976; London: Gollancz, 1977.
- Publication date: 1976
- Media type: Print
- ISBN: 0-575-02191-8

Shadrach in the Furnace is a science fiction novel by American writer Robert Silverberg, first published as a serial in Analog Science Fiction and Fact magazine in the August, September, and October 1976 issues. It was subsequently published by Bobbs Merrill in 1976. The novel was nominated in 1976 for the Nebula Award, and in 1977 for the Hugo Award.

The story takes place in 2012, and is set in Ulaanbaatar (Mongolia's capital), which has become the world capital. The main character is Shadrach Mordecai, personal doctor of the world dictator, Genghis II Mao IV. The dictator wants to reach immortality, and puts all of his efforts to financing projects that can save him from death. The three main projects are Phoenix, Talos, and Avatar. The story then delves into the relationship between Shadrach and Genghis Mao, the ethical problems of a doctor in this situation, and above all, the developments of the plot when the man who needs to be used in Project Avatar is finally chosen.

== Background ==
The story takes place in 2012 in a reconstituted world. Constant warfare and natural disasters led to numerous economic recessions, causing a quick drop in standard of living across the globe. The chaos culminated in a disaster known as the Cotopaxi eruption in South America, which darkened the skies even until the day after the incident. This disaster gave rebels the opportunity to strike, which triggered other uprisings all over the globe. After this, the Virus War broke out, leading to a break out of a pandemic known as organ rot, which spread across the globe, ravaging the world. Due to all this destruction, governments in the world surrendered their authority to the last secure regime standing, known as the Permanent Revolutionary Committee of Mongolia, led by Chairman Genghis II Mao IV Khan. The entire world is ruled by a series of governing committees in every nation and is ruled directly by the PRC in Ulaanbaatar. The committee maintains its power because the rest of the world is apathetic to politics and interested only in getting by life's daily problems. All government officials are entitled to various antidotes, protecting them from the organ rot disease, thus allowing members of the ruling class to live in luxury compared to the destruction of the outside world. The dictator Genghis Mao, in a struggle to maintain his youth, constantly undergoes various organ transplants in order to prevent organ failure. In the novel, where the dictator is in his 90s, it is mentioned that he has the strength of a man in his 50s. In order to allow the dictator to achieve immortality, three main projects are being undergone to explore various possibilities to achieve immortality. The first, Project Talos, looks at the possibility of transforming mannerisms, personalities and habits into digital codings which can then be programmed onto an automated machine, allowing the dictator to operate his administrative duties after death. Project Phoenix, as the name suggests, attempts to regenerate body cells using a given genome, in this case that of the dictator, in order to allow the body, and his brain, to be regenerated after death. And lastly, Project Avatar, deals with transforming personality and habits into codings which can be transferred into a separate living entity, allowing Genghis Mao to function in the body of another being.

== Plot ==
The story begins on 14 May 2012 as Dr. Shadrach Mordecai, personal physician of the dictator Genghis II Mao IV, awakens. He checks the health of the dictator through a series of implants within his body that link to the general health of his client, allowing him to receive any information on the health of the dictator through codings of various twitches in his own body. Through a series of security checks, he enters into his office to prepare for a kidney transplant for his master.

As he passes Surveillance Vector One, the eye on the world which gives committee members the ability to view all events happening on Earth, he meets Mangu, the prince of the world and viceroy of the committee, a charming man who earns the admiration of all his subjects. Mangu is concerned about the surgery, but Shadrach Mordecai assures the prince that Genghis Mao has grown used to surgeries. Here, Shadrach also reveals to the reader that Mangu was chosen as the subject for Project Avatar, where Genghis Mao will continue to reign in the body of his own son. He also feels sorry for Mangu, since he was tricked by his father into believing that he would inherit the throne. Once in his office, he contacts Nicholas Warhaftig, surgeon of the dictator. Warhaftig orders Shadrach to bring Genghis Mao to the Surgery by 0900. Soon, Genghis Mao himself contacts Shadrach to ask how his health is that day. As Shadrach tells the dictator of his health state, he also informs the dictator of the incoming surgery and its timing. Genghis Mao requests for Shadrach to enter his room and prepare him for the surgery at 0900. We also learn from this conversation that the surgery would give the dictator the fourth liver he is having. Afterwards, Shadrach looks up the leaders of the projects Talos, Phoenix and Avatar, for it is his responsibility as personal physician to the Khan to keep checks on the progress of such projects. First, he contacts Katya Lindman of Project Talos. She reports to Shadrach their progress in coding Genghis Mao's eyelid mannerisms and as Shadrach asks her to continue working on coding his mental processes, she has an apprehensive look but agrees. Next, he contacts Irayne Sarafrazi of Project Phoenix. She talks of her problems with brain cell deterioration and becomes worried as Shadrach presses for her to make further progress in the subject. Lastly, he contacts Nikki Crowfoot of Project Avatar, who is also Shadrach's lover. After she recounts her progress, she arranges a meeting with Shadrach for 0230.

Shadrach reveals to the reader his belief that Project Avatar is far superior to the other two, since Project Talos could only create an automated Genghis Mao which could never live up to the ability of the original while Project Phoenix would constantly be confronted with the problem of brain cell regeneration. Afterwards, he leaves to take Genghis Mao to the Surgery. As Warhaftig and his team operate on the dictator, Shadrach, due to his implants, acts as a "computer" for the team, informing them of the health status of the dictator throughout the entire surgical process. During the operation, Shadrach also comments on the calmness and tranquility of the dictator and how he has grown accustomed to constant organ transplants. After the surgery, he prepares to leave with Crowfoot to Karakorum, the playground of the world's ruling class. As they enter Karakorum, Nikki Crowfoot muses about how Shadrach and Genghis Mao are like one entity and compares them to the sculptor and his sculpture, how the actions and health situation of Genghis Mao affect the actions of Shadrach. Nikki Crowfoot decides they ought to go to the transtemporallism tent, where supposedly religious rites are carried out using chemicals to transport a client into a dream-like state where he may witness famous scenes, usually related to Christianity. Shadrach is transported to the scene of the Cotopaxi eruption, where he helplessly watches the civilians die all around him. When he wakes up and leaves the tent, he sees many government members, who greet him. Among them is Roger Buckmaster, who claims that he has gained enlightenment from the transtemporallist experience.

Buckmaster first recounts his dream of the Last Supper and the subsequent betrayal at Gethsemane, and how it taught him to hate evil. Then, he begins insulting Shadrach and blaming him for keeping Genghis Mao alive. Both Shadrach and Buckmaster have a lengthy moral argument, but soon Nikki Crowfoot leaves the tent and they leave the area, with Buckmaster shouting curses to Shadrach. Shadrach and Nikki book a room and sleep together, after which they encounter Bela Horthy and Donna Lambile, two members of the government.

Mangu is giving a speech about the worldwide distribution of Rondevic's Antidote against organ rot, to which Bela Horthy yells curses that Genghis Mao constantly lies about healing the world from the organ rot disease, despite the desperate urgings of Lambile. The next day, Shadrach awakes feeling tremendous vigorous twitches from the implants and immediately rushes to meet the Khan. There, he sees many government members surrounding the dictator. He learns from Ionigylakis, the Vice President, that Mangu was assassinated. He soon realises that the twitches were due to the shock from Genghis Mao when he received the news. He also learns that Bela Horthy was the one who witnesses Mangu falling from his window before he informed the Khan. Genghis Mao gives Avogadro, the security chief, orders for subsequent arrests and sentences against suspected individuals in order to invoke fear into the population.

In Committee Vector One, Shadrach has a brief conversation with Avogadro, who states that no one, not even Bela Horthy, saw any assassins throw Mangu out of the window, thus many government members believe it was merely suicide, but Genghis Mao remains convinced that Mangu was killed. Shadrach then asks Bela Horthy about the exact recount he gave to Genghis Mao. At first, Horthy is apprehensive but soon replies that he merely stated that Mangu had died and nothing else. Shadrach also learns from Horthy that Buckmaster has become a prime suspect in the assassination case due to his words of folly at Karakorum the previous night. Shadrach asks Horthy about his own words at Karakorum, but Horthy insists that he was not at Karakorum at all. Meanwhile, the committee members are in chaos as General Gonchigdorge struggles anxiously to find possible suspects and Surveillance Vector One. As the general calls for Frank Ficifolia, Ficifolia reveals to Shadrach his opinion that the committee members have gone mad and that Mangu had probably committed suicide. Shadrach returns to his room, where he sees Nikki Crowfoot. He recounts to her the incidents that occurred and Crowfoot is immediately shocked since her project is affected by the death of the chosen subject. As she listens to the subsequent events, she comments that Bela Horthy probably intended for Genghis Mao to feel great shock due to his testimony and perish. Shadrach returns to his office where he receives a call from Katya Lindman, who requests that he review her progress on Project Talos. She shows the robot of Genghis Mao and all its actions and becomes angry when Shadrach does not seem impressed. As she continues to show Shadrach all her equipment, Shadrach begins to suspect that she has feelings for him.

Later on, he receives a call from Avogadro to participate in his interrogation of Buckmaster. During the interrogation, Buckmaster constantly defends himself, saying that he was drugged from the transtemporallism. Avogadro is shocked that Shadrach also attempts to defend Buckmaster, but more passively. However, in the end, Buckmaster is arrested on the basis of a faulty "I'll destroy him" while he was arguing with Shadrach at Karakorum. Shadrach then argues with Avogadro, saying that it was not justified to arrest a man he knew was innocent. However, Avogadro is apathetic to the plight of Buckmaster and even uses Shadrach's words at Karakorum against him that "guilt is a luxury we cannot afford". They both assume that Buckmaster is being sent to the Organ Farms, where his organs would be used to support the dictator. The next day, Shadrach visits Genghis Mao, who speaks deliriously and even offers to make Shadrach pope in Rome. Shadrach infers that Genghis Mao has gone mad over the death of Mangu. That night, he goes to Karakorum with Katya Lindman, where they try dream-death, an experience where one is placed in a dream-like state and imagines death and the subsequent afterlife. Shadrach travels the afterlife realm with Katya in his dreams, and after enjoying themselves, to enters into a tranquil state before awaking. Katya reveals that she was having a different dream from him, one which was not as light-hearted as his. Then, they return home to rest, where Katya randomly and suddenly warns Shadrach to be careful. Nikki Crowfoot grows increasingly distant from him, and Shadrach is unable to discover why. He visits Genghis Mao and informs the dictator of an aneurysm he detected in the dictator's abdominal aorta. The news annoys Genghis Mao, since he is preparing a colossal funeral for Mangu which he refuses to delay. Shadrach has lunch with Katya, who reveals to him that, on the night before his death, she informed Mangu that he was chosen as the Avatar subject. Katya tells Shadrach that she did so only out of sympathy for Mangu, but Shadrach suspects that she wanted to kill the Avatar subject so that her project could supersede Nikki's and hopefully destroy her relationship with Shadrach so she could have him too. However, he soon realises that his suspicions contradict Katya's decision to reveal this information to him. Shadrach hopes to visit Nikki and after learning that she had fallen ill, makes the decision to visit her in her room. There, he pretends to examine her but subsequently asks about her project, to which she responds angrily, ranting about the setbacks in her work. As Shadrach leaves, he also reveals to Nikki that a member of Project Talos informed Mangu that he had been chosen as the Avatar subject, but he disguises it as a rumour. However, Nikki believes it and instantly suspects Katya Lindman to be the culprit. Later, Shadrach confesses to Katya what he had revealed to Nikki. Katya is disturbed at first, but soon informs Shadrach that he had been chosen as the next Avatar subject. Shadrach soon realises that that had to be the reason Nikki had chosen to distance herself from him. Katya advises Shadrach to make a plan of escape and also tells him not to trust Nikki anymore, since she must have agreed to continue her work despite the fact that he was chosen. The day of the aorta transplant arrives. During the surgeries, Shadrach thinks to himself that if he killed Genghis Mao on the operating table, Project Avatar would be finished. He muses about plans such as jostling Warhaftig's elbow or feeding them misleading information, but resolves not to.

In his office, Shadrach begins thinking about Genghis Mao's possible origins and begins crafting fake diary entries from the perspective of Genghis Mao in his mind. Soon, he decides to confront Nikki Crowfoot about him being the Avatar subject. Nikki is shocked and somewhat remorseful, but she defends herself, saying there was nothing she could do. Shadrach is distraught, but lets the matter rest. He resorts to carpentry to cope with the stress. On one of his adventures to the carpentry chapel, he meets Frank Ficifolia, who offers Shadrach the chance to escape from Ulan Bator and remain hidden. Ficifolia also reveals that members of the government helped to conceal Buckmaster, who is still alive, and offers to do the same for Shadrach. However, Shadrach is unsure and asks for time to think. Then, he is approached by Bela Horthy, who advises Shadrach to take the offer and flee from Ulan Bator, but Shadrach continues to refuse. He makes a visit to the Project Avatar laboratory to meet Nikki Crowfoot. After a tour of the laboratory, Nikki takes him to her office. She advises Shadrach to flee from Ulan Bator, even at the expense of her work. However, Shadrach still wants more time to think, to which Nikki responds that she loves him still. Soon, Shadrach decides to go on a vacation so that he would think better overseas. He informs Genghis Mao about his decision, who is slightly disappointed but agrees. Shadrach first goes to Nairobi, where he meets Bhishma Das, a merchant. Bhishma Das constantly asks him questions about the organ rot disease and the Roncevic's Antidote. As they continue their conversation, Shadrach begins speaking of utopian ideals that, after many years, the world will rebuild itself. Although he is unsure of this prophecy, under the encouragement of Bhishma Das, he becomes convinced that that will eventually happen. This gives him encouragement to deal with the problem of Project Avatar. He then leaves for Jerusalem, where he meets Meshach Yakov at the Wailing Wall. Shadrach is distressed about the widespread organ rot and poverty amongst the people, including children, and he prays. Meshach takes Shadrach to his house, where he and his family chat with Shadrach about politics. He then goes to Istanbul, Rome and San Francisco. In each place, he is constantly distressed by the suffering of the people but also begins to suspect that the Citpols, policemen of the Genghis Mao regime, are spying on him.

At San Francisco, he meets an old friend, Jim Ehrenreich, who is struck with organ rot and requests that Shadrach steal some of Rondevic's Antidote for him. However, Shadrach refuses, saying that the antidote only immunises and cannot cure. At first, Ehrenreich is angry but after a while, he accepts his fate. At Peking, Shadrach begins to feel strange twitches in his implants and after a series of checks begins to suspect clogging of cerebrospinal fluid. He rushes to the airport, hoping to get a quick flight back to Ulan Bator. At the airport, he meets Avogadro, who informs Shadrach of the multiple headaches suffered by Genghis Mao and that he requested for Shadrach's return to the capital. Shadrach returns to the capital and visits Genghis Mao, informing his master of the problem and suggests that it be cured by brain surgery: more specifically, to implant valved tubes to his skull to drain the excess fluid. Afterwards, Shadrach arranges a meeting with Frank Ficifolia, requesting to meet Buckmaster. Although Ficifolia is annoyed that Shadrach chose to return when he could have escaped the capital, Shadrach reassures him that he has a plan. Ficifolia agrees to arrange the meeting. Shadrach is taken to the transtemporallists in Karakorum, where Buckmaster has hidden himself as an ascetic, entering multiple dreams to witness the life of Jesus. Shadrach requests for Buckmaster to create a device that will allow him to control the valve that will be implanted into Genghis Mao, and after much persuasion, Buckmaster agrees.

In Ulan Bator, he arranges a meeting with Katya Lindman. Both of them talk about the funeral of Mangu, which he missed while he was on holiday. He also informs her about his cure for the headaches of Genghis Mao, and despite the warnings of Katya, Shadrach states that he has a plan to save himself. Soon, Genghis Mao is operated on and the valved tubes transplanted. He then meets Nikki Crowfoot, who informs him of her progress in Project Avatar. She adds that she hopes her project will not be chosen, but Shadrach tells her not to worry about him but to focus on her work instead. To rest, he leaves again for Karakorum unaccompanied and visits the dream-death tent, where he enters the afterlife and heals numerous people in the dream. He is hailed as their Saviour but is soon interrupted by the scene of Katya informing him that he was chosen as the Avatar subject. Shocked, he awakens and returns to Ulaanbaatar. Already implanted with the device to control the valved tubes, Shadrach visits Genghis Mao and informs him of how he is able to control the tubes using the device implanted in his hand and whenever he clenches his fist, the tubes will reverse, quickly killing the dictator. Instead of begging or becoming angry, Genghis Mao is pleased and informs Shadrach that he was never going to become the Avatar subject in the first place. He also admires Shadrach's shrewdness in dealing with the situation. Shadrach demands to become a committee member in charge of public health to oversee the production and worldwide distribution of Roncevic's Antidote. Genghis Mao agrees and, confused about the dictator's reactions, Shadrach leaves the room to admire the outside world.

== Characters ==
- Shadrach Mordecai - Dr. Shadrach Mordecai is the personal physician to the Mongol dictator Genghis Mao. Born in Philadelphia, he worked his way until attaining government position. At the start of the novel, he is relatively loyal to the dictator, arguing against dissidents such as Roger Buckmaster and Bela Horthy. He is also a realist, constantly weighing out possibilities when faced with a dilemma. This is most evident after he discovers that he was chosen as the Avatar subject and he refuses to escape from Ulan Bator because he is concerned about how he will live his life after the run. He is also quite philosophical and sympathetic, especially during his vacation, when he ponders about death and the suffering of individuals and how the world could be improved. He also proves to be quite intelligent when he makes the plan to place a valved tube into Genghis Mao's skull which he would be able to control. However, he is restrained and calm, since he does not kill the dictator when he has the chance but instead demands a committee position so that he may oversee a worldwide distribution of Rondevic's Antidote. His love life is also complicated, on one hand attracted to Nikki Crowfoot but upset at her betrayal, and on the other hand repelled by the non-feminine features of Katya Lindman but moved by her love and concern for him. By the end of the novel, it is still ambiguous which girl he prefers.
- Genghis Mao - Also known as Chairman Genghis II Mao IV Khan of the Permanent Revolutionary Committee, he is the dictator of the world governing the ruins of the Virus War. According to Shadrach's speculations, he was probably from an unknown village but slowly worked his way into politics. He rules the world because the populace is apathetic to politics, more concerned with the grit of daily life. Obsessed with youth and immortality, he funds a series of projects to sustain life after death and undergoes various organ transplants to maintain his youthful strength. A survivor at heart, he is a cunning schemer, deceiving his own son Mangu into believing that he is the heir to the throne when he was chosen as the Avatar subject. He has a mysterious nature, but he is also very calm, as seen from how when Shadrach threaten to kill him, Genghis Mao was unaffected and simply told Shadrach that he was never the Avatar subject in the first place and does not show anger when he is forced to appoint Shadrach to the committee. Very egotistical, his elaborate funeral for Mangu was also a form of self-worship to mourn the death of his would-be body.
- Nikki Crowfoot - The lover of Shadrach, she is the head scientist in charge of Project Avatar. At the start of the novel, her love for Shadrach seems genuine and fervent, enjoying their time in bed and also admiring the close connection he has with the dictator. However, after the death of Mangu, her love for Shadrach only goes so far as it was overpowered by her fear of Genghis Mao. She admits that she did not attempt to sway the opinion of the dictator when he was picked as the Avatar subject, but her love for him still remains quite strong, especially when she advises Shadrach to flee from Ulan Bator at the expense of her own project. Insightful and intelligent, she was also able to detect that Katya Lindman had been the one who informed Mangu of the truth, causing his death, and that she was the one who informed Shadrach that he was the next victim. By the end of the novel, it is unsure whether Shadrach still loves her as much as he did but it is obvious that her feelings for him have not changed.
- Katya Lindman - The head scientist in charge of Project Talos, Katya Lindman is one of women Shadrach has feelings for. A fiery and passionate woman, she is easily angered when Shadrach presses for her progress. Throughout the novel, she seems to have a fervent jealousy against Nikki Crowfoot due to her professional success and the fact that she is the girlfriend of Shadrach. However, Katya also has a genuine and fervent love for Shadrach, as evident from how she warned him to be careful of Genghis Mao and subsequently informing him that he was chosen as the Avatar subject. She is also sympathetic to others, as evident from how sorry she felt when she told Mangu the truth. However, even when protecting Shadrach, her hatred against Nikki remains, especially when she advised Shadrach to break up with her due to her betrayal. At the end of the novel, at her final meeting with Shadrach, she wears effeminate clothing which surprises Shadrach, since he finds it unnatural, but it is revealed that she did so only to please Shadrach.
- Roger Buckmaster - A skilled microengineer serving Genghis Mao, Roger Buckmaster was the scientist who built the implants connecting Shadrach to Genghis Mao. At Karakorum, after a transtemporallist experience to the Last Supper and the betrayal at Gethsemane, his world view changes and he yells curses against Genghis Mao and subsequently Shadrach for keeping the dictator alive. When he was interrogated as a suspect for the murder of Mangu, he denies ever hating the dictator, claiming that he was drugged. Although he is placed under arrest and sent to the organ farms, members of the government rescue him by hiding him in Karakorum under the transtemporallists while faking the organ farm records. Afterwards, when Shadrach visits Buckmaster, he is a changed man, due to his constant visits of the life of Jesus Christ, he lives an ascetic life, like that of a monk. Although he has chosen to forget his previous life under Genghis Mao, he still relents to build the valved tube device under Shadrach's request.
- Bela Horthy - Another dissident against Genghis Mao, he is first seen at Karakorum with his lover Donna Lambile. During a speech by Mangu about the worldwide distribution of Rondevic's Antidote, he yells curses against Genghis Mao for brainwashing the populace into waiting for an antidote that will never come. However, when Mangu is supposedly killed and Roger Buckmaster, who was also at Karakorum and too cursed Genghis Mao, Bela Horthy is adamant that he was never at Karakorum and he had cursed the dictator. However, he proves to be a dissident when he is among the government members to advise and offer Shadrach the chance to escape from Ulaanbaatar and avoid becoming the Avatar subject.
- Frank Ficifolia - An engineer and designer of Surveillance Vector One and a committee member of the government, Frank Ficifolia is among the government members who offer Shadrach the theory that Mangu committed suicide and was not assassinated. Later on, when Shadrach is chosen as the Avatar subject, he constantly advises him to flee from Ulan Bator to save his life. He is the first to inform Shadrach that Roger Buckmaster was spared death and offers Shadrach the same opportunity. When Shadrach returns to Ulan Bator, he chastises him for returning to Ulan Bator, where he knows his doom awaits, but agrees to arrange a meeting with Roger Buckmaster at Shadrach's requests, despite his uncertainty about his plan.
- Avogadro - The Security Chief working under Genghis Mao, Avogadro is the first to express to Shadrach the idea that Mangu committed suicide instead of being assassinated. Although he received direct orders from the dictator to arrest numerous suspects and send them off to the organ farms, he saw the plan as madness since he believed that no one was guilty for the death of Mangu. However, he proves to be more pragmatic than idealistic, especially at the interrogation of Roger Buckmaster, where he arrests him under little evidence of intended murder. During his argument with Shadrach regarding the arrests, he shuns Shadrach's argument that it was not justified to arrest people he knew were innocent by reiterating the idea that "guilt is a luxury we cannot afford", quoting Shadrach's words at Karakorum.
- Mangu - A naive princeling and viceroy of the world, he was deceived by his father into believing that he would inherit the throne, when in truth he was destined to become the Avatar victim. Charming and outgoing, he gave many speeches to the populace and earned the admiration of the world citizens. He had a close relationship with his father, eager to learn more about politics so that he would become a capable ruler. He is also very humble and modest, as seen from a meeting with Katya Lindman where he expressed his concern that he was not ready to take the throne. However, when the truth was revealed to him, it was a betrayal to his strong relationship with his father. Too much for the young prince, he committed suicide and his father threw an elaborate funeral for him.
- Nicholas Warhaftig - A professional medical expert and surgeon to Genghis Mao, even though he holds a lower position that Shadrach, it is an unspoken pact between them that he holds more influence since he is a more experienced and more capable doctor than Shadrach. Shadrach, and many other medical experts in various government departments, greatly admire and look up to Warhaftig due to his skilled surgical abilities and careful hands. We see him operating on Genghis Mao for the liver transplant, aorta transplant and the implantation of the valved tube. During all three, he proves a capable surgeon and doctor.
- Bhishma Das - A Hindu merchant living in Nairobi, he is very thoughtful about the world around him, constantly pondering about human folly and how it led to the organ rot disease. When Shadrach arrives at Nairobi, he greets him in a gentlemanly manner and asks numerous questions about the disease and how it was implanted in human DNA after the Virus War. Although he has a bleak idea of the present, he is pleased when Shadrach offers an optimistic prediction of the future and how the humans will rebuild the world and start anew. Very hospitable, he is kind to Shadrach during the trip and even offers a room in his house for Shadrach to stay in. He understands the idea of contentment and even claims that if he were to contract the organ rot disease, he would not mind since he lived a good, long life.
- Meshach Yakov - An American-born Jew living in Jerusalem, he is dismayed and agonized by the state of mankind and how it has destroyed itself but constantly turns to the Lord in prayer for solace. Every day, he visits the Wailing Wall to pray. When Shadrach travels to Jerusalem, Meshach is amused that their names both refer to Biblical heroes in Babylon. He and his family seem to be devout Jews, all of them having Biblical names and constantly turning to God for protection over their lives.
- Jim Ehrenreich - An American and one of Shadrach's childhood friends, he was once a track shot-putter in Shadrach's school team. He worked his way to become a government member in the committee governing the United States of America, having easy access to Rondevic's Antidote. However, he fell in love with a girl whose brother contracted organ rot. Desperate to save him, he attempted to steal some of the antidote but was caught instead. He was retrenched of his position and, due to his reliance on the antidote, almost immediately contracted organ rot. When he meets Shadrach in San Francisco, he begs for some of the antidote but becomes indignant when Shadrach refuses. However, he soon calms down and accepts his fate.

== Reception ==
New York Times reviewer Gerald Jonas faulted Silverberg's plotting, saying that "His characters come to resemble the stilted figures in a morality play, responding not to their own needs or to each other's actions but to the arbitrary dictates of the author." Richard A. Lupoff praised the novel as "a fine and rewarding book . . . one of Silverberg's superior performances"; although he faulted the climax as "arbitrary, almost perfunctory."
