= Lynne Reid Banks =

British writer (1929–2024)

- לין ריד בנקס
- Born: 31 July 1929; Barnes, Surrey, England
- Died: 4 April 2024 (aged 94); Surrey, England
- Occupation: Author
- Spouse: Chaim Stephenson (m. 1965; died 2016)
- Children: 3
- Writing career
- Notable works: The Indian in the Cupboard; The L-Shaped Room
- Lynne Reid Banks's voice from the BBC programme Bookclub, 6 June 2010.
- Website: lynnereidbanks.com

Lynne Reid Banks (Hebrew: לין ריד בנקס; 31 July 1929 – 4 April 2024) was a British author of books for children and adults, including The Indian in the Cupboard, which has sold over 15 million copies and has been adapted to film. Her first novel, The L-Shaped Room, published in 1960, was an instant and lasting best seller. It was later made into a movie of the same name and led to two sequels, The Backward Shadow and Two is Lonely. Banks also wrote a biography of the Brontë family, entitled Dark Quartet, and a sequel about Charlotte Brontë, Path to the Silent Country.

== Life and career ==
Banks was born in Barnes, London, the only child of doctor James and actress Muriel Reid Banks. She was evacuated to Saskatoon, Saskatchewan, Canada during World War II, with her mother and cousin, and returned after the war was over. Banks attended St Teresa's School Effingham in Surrey. Before becoming a writer, she was an actress, attending drama school, and in 1955 began working as a television journalist at ITN, one of the first women to do so in Britain. However, Banks felt she was pigeonholed into writing about certain subjects, and was often put to work writing scripts.

In 1960, Banks released her first book, The L-Shaped Room, to massive success. Two years later, Banks emigrated to Israel, where she taught for eight years on a kibbutz, Yas'ur. In 1965, Banks married Chaim Stephenson (1926–2016), a sculptor; they had three sons together. Although not Jewish, she became an Israeli citizen.

Although the family returned to England in 1971, the influence of Banks' time in Israel can be seen in some of her books (including One More River and its sequel, Broken Bridge, and other books, such as An End to Running and Children at the Gate) which are set partially or mainly on kibbutzim. In England, the family lived in the London suburbs and Beaminster, Dorset.

In October 2013, Banks won the J. M. Barrie award for outstanding contribution to children's arts.

In her later years, Banks lived in Shepperton, Surrey. She died from cancer at a care facility in Surrey, on 4 April 2024; Banks was 94 years old.

== Works ==
=== Children's novels ===
- The Farthest-Away Mountain, illus. Victor Ambrus (London: Abelard-Schuman, 1976); US ed., 1977; also illus. Dave Henderson
- The Adventures of King Midas, illustrated by George Him (J. M. Dent, 1976), LCCN 76-379385; illus. Joseph A. Smith (William Morrow & Co, 1992), LCCN 92-3795
- The Indian in the Cupboard series
  - The Indian in the Cupboard (1980)
  - The Return of the Indian (1985)
  - The Secret of the Indian (1989)
  - The Mystery of the Cupboard (1993)
  - The Key to the Indian (1998)
- The Fairy Rebel. Turtleback. 1985. ISBN 978-0-606-00995-9., illus. William Geldart
- Harry the Poisonous Centipede, illustrated by Tony Ross
  - Harry the Poisonous Centipede: A Story to Make You Squirm. Morrow/HarperCollins. 1 August 1997. ISBN 0-688-14711-9.
  - Harry the Poisonous Centipede's Big Adventure. HarperCollins. 2001. ISBN 0-06-029139-7.
  - Harry the Poisonous Centipede Goes to Sea (2006)
- I, Houdini: The Autobiography of a Self-educated Hamster. J. M. Dent. 1978. ISBN 978-0-460-06873-4.; Illustrations Terry Riley, US ed., 1988
- Angela and Diabola. Avon/HarperCollins. 1 May 1997. ISBN 0-380-97562-9.
- Alice-By-Accident. HarperCollins. 2000. ISBN 0-380-97865-2.
- Tiger, Tiger. Delacorte. 2004. ISBN 978-0-00-719041-6.
- Bad Cat Good Cat, illus. Tony Ross (2011)
- Ella and her bad Yellow T-Shirt, illus. Omri Stephenson (OGS, 2011)
- The Wrong-Coloured Dragon, illus. Joanna Scott (Kindle, 2012)
- Uprooted. HarperCollins. 2015. ISBN 978-0-00-813235-4. OCLC 881018287.
- The Red Red Dragon (Walker Books, 2022)

Short stories

- The Magic Hare. Morrow/HarperCollins. 1 August 1993. ISBN 0-688-10895-4.; illus. Barry Moser and Hilda Offen
- Sarah and After: the matriarchs (The Bodley Head, 1975) LCCN 75-318081; US title, Sarah and After: five women who founded a nation – Bible stories

Older readers

- One More River. Vallentine, Mitchell. 1973. ISBN 978-0-85303-149-9.
- My Darling Villain (Bodley Head, 1977); US ed., 1986
- The Writing on the Wall. Harper & Row. 1981. ISBN 978-0-06-020389-4.88
- Melusine: A Mystery. Hamilton Children's. 1988. ISBN 978-0-241-12548-9.; US ed., 1989
- One More River, revised edition (NY: William Morrow, 1992), LCCN 91-43152
- Broken Bridge. Hamish Hamilton. 1994. ISBN 978-0-241-13454-2. LCCN 94026636.; US ed., 1994 (revised?) – sequel to One More River
- Maura's Angel (1998)
- Moses in Egypt: A Novel Inspired by The Prince of Egypt and The Book of Exodus. Thomas Nelson Incorporated. July 1998. ISBN 978-0-8499-5898-4. LCCN 99190535.
- The Dungeon. HarperCollins. 2002. ISBN 0-06-623782-3.
- Stealing Stacey (2004)

=== Adult novels ===
- All in a Row: a comedy in three acts (Deane, 1956), LCCN 56-41380
- The L-Shaped Room (Chatto & Windus, 1960); US ed., 1961
- An End to Running. Chatto & Windus. 1962. published in the US as House of Hope (Simon & Schuster, 1962)
- Children at the Gate (Chatto & Windus, 1968)
- The Backward Shadow. Simon and Schuster. 1970. ISBN 978-0-671-20671-0. – sequel to The L-Shaped Room
- Two is Lonely (Chatto & Windus, 1974) – completes the L-Shaped Room trilogy
- Dark Quartet: the story of the Brontës (Weidenfeld & Nicolson, 1976); US ed., 1977 – Biographical fiction
- Path to the Silent Country: Charlotte Brontë's Years of Fame. Delacorte Press. 1977. ISBN 978-0-440-06985-0.; US ed., 1978
- Defy the Wilderness (Chatto & Windus, 1981)
- The Warning Bell (Hamish Hamilton, 1984); US ed., 1986
- Casualties (1986); US ed., 1987
- Fair Exchange (Piatkus, 1998) ISBN 978-0-7499-0424-1

=== Non-fiction ===
- Letters to My Israeli Sons: The Story of Jewish Survival. W. H. Allen. 1979. ISBN 978-0-491-02610-9. LCCN 80455044.
- Torn Country: an oral history of the Israeli war of independence (New York: Franklin Watts, 1982)

=== Picture books ===
- The Spice Rack, illus. Omri Stephenson (OGS Designs, 2010)
- Polly and Jake, illus. Omri Stephenson (OGS, 2010)
