= Denis Pitts =

Denis Pitts (6 January 1930 – 19 April 1994) was a journalist, filmmaker and novelist.

Denis Pitts first became widely known for his reports on the Suez Crisis and his subsequent articles in the New Statesman. In Suez he made the acquaintance of Michael Parkinson, who at the time was in charge of liaising with the press, and they would later work together for the Granada regional news programme, Scene at 6.30. While at Granada he wrote an episode of Coronation Street and did a series of interviews with Clement Attlee which the former prime minister agreed to if published posthumously.

He continued to work in television making a film called ‘What the Hell Happens in Marlborough?’ which caused a stir locally. He went on to make The World of Gracie Fields and The World of Bob Hope for the BBC. Gracie Fields revealed marital problems, also for posthumous publication, which he wrote up for The People. While making the Bob Hope film, he filmed the anti-Vietnam protest at Kent State University in which the National Guard killed four students.

He published three novels. This City is Ours (US title: Target Manhattan) about a native American hijacking of a ship in New York harbour; The Predator which told the story of a wealthy businessman kidnapping Common Market leaders during a summit and which includes a long section set during the Suez Crisis. The last one, Rogue Hercules, tells of amoral pilots carrying a plane load of arms over southern African countries in search of a buyer.

He was a senior editor for Chronicle yearbooks, Chronicle of the 20th Century and Chronicle of the World. His Guardian obituary called him a ‘Fresh Breeze in Moscow’, relating to his stint working as the correspondent there for the Daily Express.

Much earlier in his career he was the last editor of Lilliput where he gave cartoonist, John Glashan his break.

His views on the death of Grace Archer in the radio soap, The Archers, are quoted by Greg Dyke in his McTaggart Lecture of 2000.
