= The Farthest-Away Mountain =

1976 book by Lynne Reid Banks

- First edition
- Author: Lynne Reid Banks
- Illustrator: Victor Ambrus
- Genre: Fantasy
- Publisher: Abelard-Schuman
- Pages: 160 (Hardcover); 160 (Library Binding); 144 (Paperback)
- ISBN: 0-3857-3077-2

The Farthest-Away Mountain is a children's novel, first published in 1976, by Lynne Reid Banks, a British author.

== Plot summary ==
The Farthest-Away Mountain is about a fourteen-year-old girl, who when she was small was asked what goals she has for her life. She responds that she will travel to the Farthest Away Mountain, meet and speak to a gargoyle, and marry a prince. One morning, she wakes up early having heard someone call to her in her dreams. She looks out the window and sees the Farthest-Away Mountain nod. She takes that as a sign that the time has come to complete the three goals,

The Farthest Away Mountain was a place of magic and the Mountain itself was alive. It called good people to come and live upon its slopes, and for many years everyone that called was very happy and lived in peace. But more than two centuries ago, a young man living in the village Dakin had come from, had been called to the Mountain. He was a teacher and among his pupils was the son of a wicked magician whom he hoped to help and keep away from evil. So he took the magician's son with him on his journey to the Mountain. This turned out to be a grave error, for the son was also very wicked and turned everything on the mountain to his own purpose, becoming the Master of the Mountain. He turned his teacher into a frog – Croak – and every person then living on the Mountain fled from before him.

It was not until years later that the Master discovered a ring that had great power and sent his four gnome slaves (Og, Vog, Zog and their fourth brother Gog) to steal it – the Ring of Kings. The gnomes were successful, but Gog stole the ring from his brothers and refused to return with it to the Mountain, so the master sent a spell down the mountain and turned him into a bronze statue. Then the Master turned the other three into gargoyles and forced them to bar the path up to the summit of the Mountain, to protect himself.

Dakin learned all of this and decided it was up to her to stop the Master – who during the night, spent time about the Mountain in the form of the Witch. She formed a plan based on what she had heard the giant on the Mountain speaking about, and went to see the Witch. She told the Witch that she herself had seen the Ring of Kings sparkling at the bottom of the Lithy pond and could get it for her. The Witch at first does not believe her, for the Lithy pond is believed to have no bottom, but Dakin convinces her. The Witch transports them both there and Dakin confuses her further by shoving her white cap in front of the Witch's eyes, then pushing her straight into the pond. This is what Dakin had overheard the giant saying. The good magic of the Lithy pond destroys the Master and the Mountain is freed.

All of the master's spells are now broken, and Dakin returns to find Gog and return the Ring to the royal family, now hoping to fulfill her third goal to marry a prince. She is appalled to find, however that the prince is rather unintelligent and dull, and decides not to marry him. She takes Gog back to the mountain to reunite him with his brothers and encounters Croak – now a handsome young man once more. They marry and become the Prince and Princess of the Mountain, completing her final goal.

== See also ==
- Young adult fiction
