= Saving the Queen =

1976 novel by William F. Buckley, Jr.

- First edition book cover
- Author: William F. Buckley, Jr.
- Language: English
- Series: Blackford Oakes
- Genre: Spy thriller, espionage
- Publisher: Doubleday
- Publication date: January 28, 1976
- Publication place: United States
- Media type: Print, 8vo
- Pages: 248
- ISBN: 9780385038003
- Followed by: Stained Glass

Saving the Queen is a 1976 American spy thriller novel by William F. Buckley, Jr., the first of eleven novels in the Blackford Oakes series.

== Plot ==
This novel, set in 1952, reveals Oakes's childhood and educational background, his recruitment into the CIA, and the Agency's procedures for "handling" him. His first assignment sends him to Britain, where he must identify (and deal with) a high-level security leak close to the (fictional) British monarch, Queen Caroline. Also, Rufus, the enigmatic genius behind American intelligence operations, is introduced.

== See also ==
- List of Blackford Oakes novels
- William F. Buckley, Jr. bibliography
