= George Frederick Sims =

George Frederick Robert Sims (3 August 1923, Hammersmith – 4 November 1999, Reading, Berkshire), also known as George Sims, was an English antiquarian bookseller and writer of crime thrillers.

He was born in the Hammersmith district of London in 1923, the son of a shoe merchant. He was educated at the John Lyons School in Harrow. He married Beryl Simcock in 1943, with whom he had three children. He served in the Intelligence Corps in the final years of World War II. After the war, he started working at Len Westwood's bookshop in Harrow before setting up as a mail order bookseller under the name of G.F. Sims. In 1952, he moved to the village of Hurst in Berkshire and remained there till his death.

G.F. Sims traded until 1987. An account of the business can be found in Mr George Sims Regrets by James Fergusson, which lists the (now very collectable) catalogues the firm issued. (The title comes from a notice he displayed in the shop: "Mr. George Sims regrets that his signature spoils books".)

As a writer, Sims published poetry, crime thrillers, and four volumes of memoirs. Several of his novels were published in Penguin paperback and won praise from figures such as H.R.F. Keating, Maurice Richardson, Roy Fuller and Evelyn Waugh. Several of his books, notably The Terrible Door (1964), involve the rare book and manuscript trade of which he had experience.

Sims' papers, and those of the firm, are held in the archives of Dartmouth College. Further papers are held as part of the archive of the Tragara Press (which published his catalogues) at the National Library of Scotland.

== Bibliography ==
=== Fiction ===
- The Terrible Door (1964)
- Sleep No More (1966)
- The Last Best Friend (1967)
- The Sand Dollar (1969)
- Dead-hand (1971)
- Hunters Point (1973)
- The End of the Web (1976)
- Rex Mundi (1978)
- Who Is Cato? (1981)
- The Keys of Death (1983)
- Coat of Arms (1984)
- The Despain Papers (1992)

=== Non-fiction ===
- The Rare Book Game (1985)
- More of the Rare Book Game (1988)
- Last of the Rare Book Game (1990)
