= Mongoose R.I.P. =

1988 novel by William F. Buckley, Jr.

- First edition
- Author: William F. Buckley, Jr.
- Language: English
- Series: Blackford Oakes
- Genre: Spy thriller, espionage
- Publisher: Random House
- Publication date: 1988
- Publication place: United States
- Media type: Print

Mongoose R.I.P. is a 1988 Blackford Oakes novel by William F. Buckley, Jr. It is the eighth of 11 novels in the series.

== Plot ==
CIA agent Blackford Oakes is sent to Cuba to determine the feasibility of overthrowing Fidel Castro, following the Cuban Missile Crisis in 1963.
