= High Jinx =

1986 novel by William F. Buckley, Jr.

- First edition
- Author: William F. Buckley, Jr.
- Language: English
- Series: Blackford Oakes
- Genre: Spy thriller, espionage
- Publisher: Doubleday
- Publication date: 1986
- Publication place: United States
- Media type: Print

High Jinx is a 1986 Blackford Oakes novel by William F. Buckley, Jr. It is the seventh of 11 novels in the series by date of publication, but occurs third chronologically.

== Plot ==
CIA agent Blackford Oakes is sent inside the Soviet Union to monitor an internal power struggle within the Kremlin in 1954.
