= Rhoda Lerman =

American author (1936–2015)

- Born: Rhoda Carol Sniderman; January 18, 1936; Far Rockaway, Queens, New York City, U.S.
- Died: August 30, 2015 (aged 79); Fenton, New York, U.S.
- Education: University of Miami (Bachelor of Arts)
- Occupations: Author; playwright
- Spouse: Robert Lerman (m. 1957)
- Website: rhodalerman.com

Rhoda Lerman (January 18, 1936 – August 30, 2015) was an American author and playwright who debuted with her novel Call Me Ishtar in 1973. She adapted her 1979 novel Eleanor, A Novel into a one-woman stage play; it was also made into the Primetime Emmy Award-winning TV movie Eleanor: First Lady of the World.

== Early life and education ==
Rhoda Carol Sniderman was born, along with her twin sister, on January 18, 1936. She grew up in her birthplace of Far Rockaway, Queens, New York City, and New Britain, Connecticut. Rhoda's mother, Gertrude (née Langfur), moved her to Miami after her father, an accountant named Jacob Sniderman, died when Rhoda was 13.

Sniderman attended the University of Miami, initially focusing on geology. While there, she met Robert Lerman, and the two married in 1957. When she was told by her advisor she could not go on field trips with him or with male students, she switched her field, and graduated with a Bachelor of Arts in English.

== Career ==
Lerman debuted in 1973 with the novel Call Me Ishtar, which was nominated for the Pulitzer Prize for Fiction. She adapted her novel Eleanor, A Novel into a one-woman stage play, Eleanor: Her Secret Journey, that toured with Jean Stapleton. The novel was also adapted into the TV movie Eleanor: First Lady of the World, which was nominated for several Primetime Emmy Awards, winning one. In 1996, she published her first nonfiction book In the Company of Newfies: A Shared Life about her life with her Newfoundland dogs.

In a review for Animal Acts, Publishers Weekly says Lerman is "justly known as a writer's writer" and "produces fascinating plots and lush, seductive prose in the service of transcendent questions."

== Death ==
Lerman died on August 30, 2015, in her home in Fenton, New York, from complications of thyroid cancer.

== List of works ==
Novels

- Call Me Ishtar (1973)
- The Girl That He Marries (1976)
- Eleanor, A Novel (1979)
- The Book of the Night (1984)
- God's Ear (1989)
- Animal Acts (1994)
- Solimeos (2023)

Books

- In the Company of Newfies: A Shared Life (1996)
- Elsa Was Born a Dog, I Was Born A Human ...Things Have Changed (2013)
