= Last Call for Blackford Oakes =

2005 novel by William F. Buckley, Jr.

- First edition
- Author: William F. Buckley, Jr.
- Language: English
- Series: Blackford Oakes
- Genre: Spy thriller, espionage
- Publisher: Harcourt
- Publication date: 2005
- Publication place: United States
- Media type: Print
- Preceded by: A Very Private Plot

Last Call for Blackford Oakes is a 2005 Blackford Oakes novel by William F. Buckley, Jr.

It is the final of the 11 novels in the Blackford Oakes series.

== Plot ==
CIA agent Blackford Oakes confronts Kim Philby, a British double agent who defected to the Soviet Union, in 1987.
