= Stained Glass (novel) =

1978 novel by William F. Buckley, Jr.

- Cover of the first edition
- Author: William F. Buckley, Jr.
- Language: English
- Series: Blackford Oakes
- Genre: Spy thriller, espionage
- Publisher: Doubleday
- Publication date: April 7, 1978
- Publication place: United States
- Media type: Print, 8vo
- Pages: 252 pp
- Awards: National Book Award
- ISBN: 9781581824629
- Preceded by: Saving the Queen
- Followed by: Who's on First

Stained Glass is an American spy thriller novel by William F. Buckley, Jr., the second of eleven novels in the Blackford Oakes series. Its first paperback edition won a 1980 National Book Award in the one-year category Mystery (paperback). (Note: From 1980 to 1983 in National Book Award history there were dual awards for hardcover and paperback books in many categories. Most all of the paperback award-winners were reprints, including this one.)

== Plot ==
Oakes's second assignment sends him to West Germany. There, he is infiltrated into the inner-circle of a charismatic and heroic nobleman, Count Wintergrin, who intends to run for the West German Chancellorship on platform of immediate re-unification with East Germany. Although this is ultimately in the interest of the Western Powers and NATO, the threat of Soviet invasion of West Europe means that Oakes must prevent Wintergrin's election, by whatever means necessary. Set in 1952.
