= Daedalus Mission =

Daedalus Mission is a novel series by Brian Stableford.

== Contents ==
Daedalus Mission consists of six novels: The Florians, Critical Threshold, Wildeblood's Empire, City of the Sun, Balance of Power and The Paradox of the Sets.

== Reception ==
Dave Langford reviewed Daedalus Mission for White Dwarf #51, and stated that "They're readable, low-key, unpretentious SF containing meaty ideas - Stableford is a former biologist who now teaches sociology. Unfortunately the characters are low-key too, and even a bit flat, not up to the standard of his earlier Hooded Swan series [Pan], and the writing is merely functional."
