= Arthur Tofte =

American novelist

Arthur R. Tofte
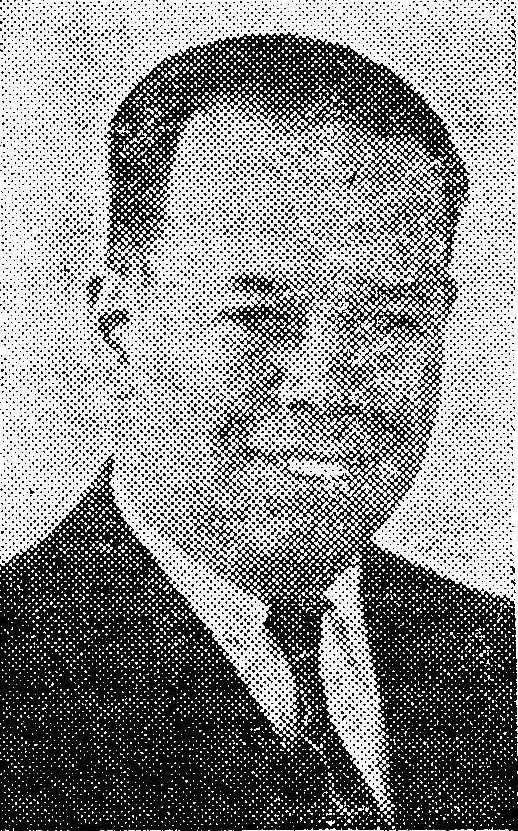
- Born: June 8, 1902
- Died: May 21, 1980 (aged 77)
- Occupations: Novelist, advertising
- Writing career
- Genre: Science Fiction

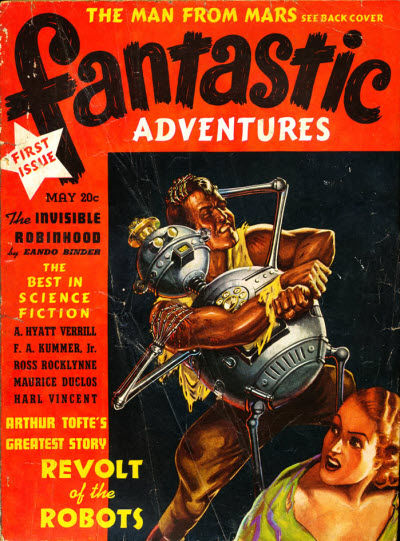
Tofte's "Revolt of the Robots" was the cover story in the first issue of Fantastic Adventures in 1939

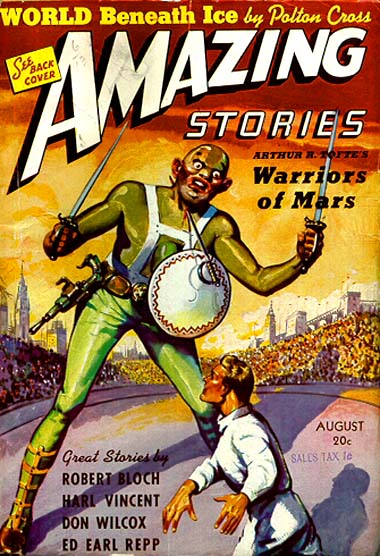
Tofte's "Warriors of Mars" was the cover story in the August 1939 issue of Amazing Stories in 1939

Arthur R Tofte (June 8, 1902 – May 21, 1980) was an American writer, best known for his science fiction and fantasy. He has an award named after him, which is given to the category of children's literature by the council for Wisconsin Writers. He was married to Dorothy Tofte and had two children.

Born in Chicago, Illinois, Tofte graduated from the University of Wisconsin in 1925 and began a career in advertising, including a stint as advertising manager of the Tom Thumb Miniature Golf business. His earliest writing included stories published in Esquire and in other general interest magazines. After joining the Fictioneers, a Milwaukee writers group which also included Stanley G. Weinbaum, he published five science fiction stories between 1938 and 1940, beginning with "The Meteor Monsters" in Amazing Stories. He described Weinbaum as a "close friend" who sparked his interest in science fiction. In 1938, Tofte became a copy chief in the Industrial Group Advertising Department of Allis-Chalmers. He remained with the company until his 1969 retirement, becoming manager of the Publications and Industrial Press Department in 1958. Tofte was also active in industry groups, and had been a vice president of the National Industrial Advertising Association as well as president of the Milwaukee Industrial Advertising Club.

After his retirement, Tofte returned to writing. He sold a string of short sf stories to Roger Elwood, followed by two novels to Elwood's Laser Books line. The novels reportedly sold about 75,000 copies each. He published three more science fictional novels as well as a historical novel, and sold short stories to magazines including Family Circle and Boys' Life. Tofte died of cancer in 1980 at his Wisconsin home. A "family novel about raising a hyperactive child", Thursday's Child appeared posthumously, as did translations of his first two sf novels into Italian.

== Science fiction ==
=== Novels ===
- Crash Landing on Iduna (1975)
- Walls Within Walls (1975)
- The Day the Earth Stood Still (1976)
- Survival on a Primitive Planet (1977)
- The Ghost Hunters (1978)

=== Short stories ===
- "Warriors of Mars" (1938)
- "The Meteor Monsters" (1938)
- "Purge of the Deaf" (1938)
- "Revolt of the Robots" (1939)
- "The Power and the People" (1940)
- "The Speeders" (1973)
- "When the Cold Came" (1974)
- "A Thirst for Blood" (1974)

==== Short stories in Swedish ====
- "Krigarna på Mars" - Published in: Jules Verne-Magasinet (Veckans äventyr), 3/1943
- "Robotarnas uppror" - Published in: Jules Verne-Magasinet (Veckans äventyr), 9/1940
