= The Blackford Oakes Reader =

1999 book by William F. Buckley Jr.

- First edition
- Author: William F. Buckley, Jr.
- Language: English
- Series: Blackford Oakes
- Published: 1999
- Publisher: Andrews McMeel Publishing
- Publication place: United States

The Blackford Oakes Reader is a 1999 book by William F. Buckley, Jr. It is a literary book in which Buckley explains where, when, why and how he created his Blackford Oakes series.
