= See You Later, Alligator (novel) =

1985 novel by William F. Buckley, Jr.

- First edition
- Author: William F. Buckley, Jr.
- Language: English
- Series: Blackford Oakes
- Genre: Spy novel
- Publisher: Doubleday
- Publication date: 1985
- Publication place: United States
- Media type: Print

See You Later, Alligator is a 1985 Blackford Oakes novel by William F. Buckley, Jr. It is the sixth of 11 novels in the series.

== Plot ==
CIA agent Blackford Oakes is sent to Cuba in 1961 to meet with Che Guevara, attempting to ease tension following the events surrounding the Bay of Pigs Invasion in the 1960s.
