= Tucker's Last Stand =

1990 novel by William F. Buckley, Jr.

- Author: William F. Buckley, Jr.
- Language: English
- Series: Blackford Oakes
- Subject: Vietnam War
- Genre: War novel, spy novel
- Publisher: Random House
- Publication date: 1990
- Publication place: United States

Tucker's Last Stand is a 1990 Blackford Oakes novel by William F. Buckley, Jr. It is the ninth of 11 novels in the series.

== Plot ==
CIA agent Blackford Oakes is sent to Vietnam in 1964 to assist in cutting off supply lines to the Viet Cong.
