= Marco Polo, If You Can =

1982 novel by William F. Buckley, Jr.

Marco Polo, if You Can
- First edition
- Author: William F. Buckley, Jr.
- Language: English
- Series: Blackford Oakes
- Genre: Spy novel
- Publisher: Doubleday
- Publication date: 1982
- Publication place: United States

Marco Polo, If You Can is a 1982 Blackford Oakes novel by William F. Buckley, Jr. It is the fourth of 11 novels in the series.

== Plot ==
CIA agent Blackford Oakes is shot down in a U-2 spy plane over the Soviet Union in 1960.
