= Russell Carpenter =

American cinematographer (born 1950)

- Born: Russell Paul Carpenter; December 9, 1950 (age 75); Van Nuys, California, U.S.
- Other names: Russ Carpenter; Paul Carpenter
- Education: San Diego State University (BA)
- Occupation: cinematographer
- Years active: 1978–present
- Spouse: Donna Ellen Conrad
- Website: russellcarpenter.com

Russell Paul Carpenter, ASC (born December 9, 1950) is an American cinematographer and photographer. He is best known for his work with director James Cameron, and won an Academy Award for Best Cinematography for Titanic (1997).

His other notable films include The Lawnmower Man (1992), Hard Target (1993), True Lies (1994), The Indian in the Cupboard (1995), Charlie's Angels (2000), Ant-Man (2015), Avatar: The Way of Water (2022), and Avatar: Fire and Ash (2025).

== Early life and education ==
The grandson of a film sound engineer, Carpenter was born in Van Nuys, California in 1950 to a family of six. After his parents divorced in 1960, he moved with his mother and three siblings to Orange County, where he took up Super 8 films as a hobby.

After graduating from Van Nuys High School, he enrolled at San Diego State University to study television directing, but later changed his major to English. To pay for school, he worked at a local public broadcasting channel, where he learned the ropes of documentary filmmaking. After graduating, he moved back to Orange County, where he shot educational films and documentaries.

== Career ==
Carpenter started his career working as DP on numerous low-budget horror films throughout the 1980s. His first major project was Lady in White, followed by Critters 2: The Main Course. The Los Angeles Times criticized the film but praised Carpenter's cinematography.

In 1983, he shot The Wizard of Speed and Time, a special effects-laden experimental film.

After shooting several episodes of the television series The Wonder Years, he worked on The Lawnmower Man.

Carpenter met James Cameron during the production of the John Woo-directed action film Hard Target, who hired him on the basis of his work on Lady in White to shoot his 1994 action comedy True Lies, and the 1996 Universal Studios attraction T2 3-D: Battle Across Time. Their next collaboration, Titanic, carried away 11 Oscars in 1997, including Best Picture and Best Cinematography.

Carpenter is a member of the American Society of Cinematographers, and received the Society's Lifetime Achievement Award in 2018.

== Personal life ==
Carpenter is married to Donna Ellen Conrad and has one son, Graham (from a previous marriage), a stepson Zak Selbert, a daughter-in-law Gaudia Correia, and two granddaughters.

== Filmography ==
Key
†	Denotes films that have not yet been released

=== Film ===
Year	Title	Director	Notes
1984	Sole Survivor	Thom Eberhardt	
1988	Lady in White	Frank LaLoggia	
1988	Cameron's Closet	Armand Mastroianni	
1988	The Wizard of Speed and Time	Mike Jittlov	
1988	Critters 2: The Main Course	Mick Garris	
1990	Solar Crisis	Richard C. Sarafian	
1990	Death Warrant	Deran Sarafian	
1991	The Perfect Weapon	Mark DiSalle	
1992	The Lawnmower Man	Brett Leonard	
1992	Pet Sematary Two	Mary Lambert	
1993	Hard Target	John Woo	
1994	True Lies	James Cameron	1st collaboration with Cameron
1995	The Indian in the Cupboard	Frank Oz	
1997	Money Talks	Brett Ratner	Shared credit with Robert Primes
1997	Titanic	James Cameron	
1998	The Negotiator	F. Gary Gray	
2000	Charlie's Angels	McG	
2001	Shallow Hal	The Farrelly Brothers	
2003	Charlie's Angels: Full Throttle	McG	
2004	Noel	Chazz Palminteri	
2005	Monster-in-Law	Robert Luketic	
2007	Awake	Joby Harold	
2008	21	Robert Luketic	
2009	The Ugly Truth	Robert Luketic	
2010	Killers	Robert Luketic	
2011	A Little Bit of Heaven	Nicole Kassell	
2012	This Means War	McG	
2013	Jobs	Joshua Michael Stern	
2014	Return to Sender	Fouad Mikati	
2014	Beyond the Reach	Jean-Baptiste Léonetti	
2015	Parched	Leena Yadav	Also credited as co-executive producer
2015	Ant-Man	Peyton Reed	
2017	XXX: Return of Xander Cage	D. J. Caruso	
2019	Noelle	Marc Lawrence	
2022	Avatar: The Way of Water	James Cameron	Shot back-to-back
2025	Avatar: Fire and Ash	James Cameron	Shot back-to-back
2027	The Last Resort †	Donald Petrie	Post-production

=== Short film ===
Year	Title	Director	Notes
1990	Redlands	Joan Taylor	
1996	T2 3-D: Battle Across Time	James Cameron; John Bruno; Stan Winston	Theme park attraction; Shared credit with Sulejman Medenčević and Peter Anderson
1997	Michael Jackson's Ghosts	Stan Winston	
2007	Lucifer	Ray Griggs	
2009	Down and Out	Matthew Mebane	Segment of Locker 13
2014	Sins of the Father	Rachel Howard	Also credited as producer
2016	The Final Adventure of John & Eleanor Greene	Matthew Mebane	

=== Television ===
Year	Title	Director	Notes
1985	The Lemon Grove Incident	Frank Christopher	Documentary special
1987	Rolling Stone Presents Twenty Years of Rock & Roll	Malcolm Leo	Documentary special
1988	CBS Schoolbreak Special	Jeffrey Auerbach	Episode "No Means No"
1991	The Wonder Years	Jeffrey Auerbach; Nick Marck; Ken Topolsky; Lyndall Hobbs	4 episodes
1993	Attack of the 50 Ft. Woman	Christopher Guest	TV movie
2013	Guilty	McG	TV movie

== Awards and nominations ==
Year	Award	Category	Title	Result
1998	Academy Awards	Best Cinematography	Titanic	Won
1998	American Society of Cinematographers	Outstanding Achievement in Cinematography	Titanic	Won
2018	American Society of Cinematographers	Lifetime Achievement Award		Won
2023	Austin Film Critics Association	Best Cinematography	Avatar: The Way of Water	Nominated
1998	British Academy Film Awards	Best Cinematography	Titanic	Nominated
1997	British Society of Cinematographers	Best Cinematography in a Theatrical Feature Film	Titanic	Nominated
1998	Chicago Film Critics Association	Best Cinematography	Titanic	Won
2023	Columbus Film Critics Association	Best Cinematography	Avatar: The Way of Water	Nominated
2023	Critics Association of Central Florida	Best Cinematography	Avatar: The Way of Water	Nominated
2023	Critics' Choice Awards	Best Cinematography	Avatar: The Way of Water	Nominated
1998	Dallas–Fort Worth Film Critics Association	Best Cinematography	Titanic	Won
2023	Dallas–Fort Worth Film Critics Association	Best Cinematography	Avatar: The Way of Water	Won
2023	Hawaii Film Critics Society	Best Cinematography	Avatar: The Way of Water	Nominated
2023	Hollywood Critics Association	Best Cinematography	Avatar: The Way of Water	Nominated
2023	Houston Film Critics Society	Best Cinematography	Avatar: The Way of Water	Nominated
1998	Las Vegas Film Critics Society	Best Cinematography	Titanic	Won
2023	Music City Film Critics' Association	Best Cinematography	Avatar: The Way of Water	Won
2023	North Carolina Film Critics Association	Best Cinematography	Avatar: The Way of Water	Nominated
2023	Portland Critics Association	Best Cinematography	Avatar: The Way of Water	Nominated
2023	San Diego Film Critics Society	Best Cinematography	Avatar: The Way of Water	Nominated
1998	Satellite Awards	Best Cinematography	Avatar: The Way of Water	Nominated
2023	Satellite Awards	Best Cinematography	Avatar: The Way of Water	Nominated
2023	Seattle Film Critics Society	Best Cinematography	Avatar: The Way of Water	Nominated
2014	SoCal Independent Film Festival	Best Cinematography	Parched	Nominated
