= Hideaway (novel) =

1992 novel by Dean Koontz

- First edition
- Author: Dean Koontz
- Cover artist: Don Brautigam
- Language: English
- Genre: thriller Mystery
- Publisher: Putnam
- Publication date: 1992
- Publication place: United States
- Media type: Print
- Pages: 384
- ISBN: 0-399-13673-8
- OCLC: 26922471

Hideaway is a novel by American horror writer Dean Koontz, published by Putnam in 1992.

It is a supernatural thriller centering on an antique dealer named Hatch Harrison who develops a telepathic connection with a serial killer after a car accident leaves him clinically dead for over 80 minutes. It was nominated for the Bram Stoker Award for Best Novel and was made into a film of the same name starring Jeff Goldblum, Christine Lahti, Alicia Silverstone, and Jeremy Sisto in 1995.

== Plot ==
Following a traffic accident that left him clinically dead for more than 80 minutes, a Southern California antique dealer named Hatch Harrison begins experiencing strange dreams and visions that connect him to a psychopathic killer who calls himself "Vassago". The killer believes that he is the human incarnation of one of the demon princes of Hell, and that if he murders enough innocent human beings and offers them up in sacrifice to his Master, he will be allowed to return to the afterlife and rule at Satan's right hand. He also has a strange condition that enables him to see in the dark, but also causes his eyes to be extremely sensitive to light.

Meanwhile, the accident gives Hatch and his wife Lindsey, an artist, a new lease on life as they struggle to rebuild their marriage in the wake of their son's death from cancer five years before. As the couple set about trying to adopt a young girl named Regina, Hatch continues to be tormented by visions, in some cases even seeing through Vassago's eyes. Making matters worse, Vassago slowly gains information about Hatch and his family in the same fashion, putting both Lindsay and Regina in danger.

It is eventually revealed that Vassago's real name is Jeremy Nyebern; as a teenager, he brutally murdered his mother and sister, then attempted to kill himself. His life was saved by the same doctor who miraculously resuscitated Hatch, Dr. Jonas Nyebern, Jeremy's father (thus facilitating the seemingly supernatural bond between the two men). Like Hatch, Jeremy was clinically dead for more than 30 minutes, and during that time, believes that he went to Hell and was later returned to do Satan's bidding. At the book's climax, Vassago's visions lead him to kidnap Regina and take her to his "hideaway" (an abandoned amusement park, where, as a boy, Jeremy committed his first murder). There, Hatch and Vassago get into a struggle that ends with Hatch beating Vassago to death with a crucifix attached to a flashlight, thus saving Regina and Lindsay. During the closing moments of this confrontation, Hatch inexplicably begins speaking in another voice and calls himself "Uriel" (whom Hatch later learns is an archangel mentioned in the Bible), thus implying that Vassago's beliefs about his demonic heritage and short-lived journey to the afterlife may not have been entirely delusional after all. Uriel/Hatch tells Vassago/Jeremy that instead of returning to Hell as a prince, he will be returned as a slave.

After Vassago's defeat, the Harrison family strengthen their bond to each other, with Regina now calling her adoptive parents Mom and Dad.

== Film adaptation ==
The novel was adapted into a feature film by Brett Leonard in 1995. It starred Jeff Goldblum, Christine Lahti, Alicia Silverstone and Jeremy Sisto. Critical reviews were mostly negative and the film was a box office disappointment. Apparently, Koontz was so disappointed in the film he fought to have his name removed from the credits.
