= The Lawnmower Man (video game) =

1993 video game

- CD-ROM cover art
- Developers: The Sales Curve; Atod (Genesis)
- Publishers: SNES: NA: THQ; EU: Storm; JP: Coconuts Japan; Genesis, Sega CD: NA/PAL: Time Warner Interactive
- Designer: Simon Pick
- Composers: Allister Brimble; Peter Hennig (Game Boy)
- Platforms: Genesis/Mega Drive, Super NES, MS-DOS, Macintosh, Sega CD, Game Boy
- Release: November 1993: SNES; NA: November 1993; EU: 1993 MS-DOS; NA: 1993; EU: 1993 Mega Drive/Genesis; NA: 1994; EU: November 1994 Sega CD; NA: 1994; EU: 1994 Macintosh; NA: May 5, 1995 Game Boy; EU: 1993
- Genres: Interactive movie, platform, shooter
- Mode: Single-player

The Lawnmower Man is a video game based on the 1992 film of the same name. The game was published in Japan by Coconuts Japan under the title Virtual Wars (バーチャル ウォーズ, Bācharu Uōzu), the name also given to the source material in said region.

== Plot ==
Dr. Lawrence Angelo is a scientist working for Virtual Space Industries (VSI) in "Project 5", a secret research facility that attempts to increase the intelligence of primates using psychotropic drugs and virtual reality (VR) training. Dr. Angelo is reluctant to use the research for military purposes, and after one of the chimps escapes and shoots a guard, Dr. Angelo is given a forced vacation. While taking notes on the need for experiment with a human subject, he discovers Jobe Smith (Jeff Fahey), a man with an intellectual disability who makes his living by doing odd jobs such as mowing the grass (hence the title of the movie). Angelo takes in Jobe, subjecting him to VR treatment. The first experiments quickly increase Jobe's intelligence, but after an accident, Dr. Angelo stops the experiments. The Shop, a secret agency overseeing Project 5, reinserts the drugs responsible for Jobe's violent behavior into the program and speeds up the treatment. As Jobe develops telekinetic powers, he starts to take revenge on those who abused him before he began the treatments, and plots to take over all of the computers in the world.

The SNES version continues the storyline after the point where it ends in the film. Jobe transfers his mind into VSI's computers, and from there is able to corrupt and destroy information systems all over the world, a course of action which is implied to bring about Dystopia. With society in complete meltdown, Dr. Angelo discovers that Jobe has been acting under the control of a person known as Zorn the Doomplayer, who is the head of The Shop, and poised to take over what remains of the world. With Jobe apparently gone missing, Angelo sets off to put an end to The Shop once and for all.

== Gameplay ==
While the CD version of the game (PC, Sega CD) is an interactive movie, all three cartridge versions have platform and shooter levels, with some first-person shooter elements being present. The player takes control of either Dr. Angelo or Carla Parkette (the mother of Jobe's best friend) in typical side-scrolling shooting action, similar to Contra and Metal Slug. The player collects weapon upgrades or data discs. Once the player has collected a number of data discs, the discs morph into a Virtual Suit that gives the player protection from one hit.

The player visits several locations seen in the movie, such as Harley's Gas 'Er Up and the VSI headquarters. The game includes true 3D level connectors that are based on the CG sequences of the movie. These involve avoiding obstacles and the occasional high-speed shooting in the VR world. There are four different levels (Virtual World, Cyber War, Cyber Run and Cyber Tube), and each takes a slightly different approach. Virtual World is set in first person and the objective is to dodge obstacles such as trees and arches to get to the exit. Cyber War is similar to Virtual World, but with some shooting stops. Cyber Run is set in the third person and requires occasional shooting of obstacles, while Cyber Tube involves fast travel and plenty of enemies in a VR tunnel.

== Reception ==
Reception

Review scores
Publication	Score
AllGame	SNES: 3.5/5
Aktueller Software Markt	PC: 10/12; SNES: 11/12
Computer and Video Games	GB: 87/100; PC: 88/100; SNES: 88/100
Electronic Gaming Monthly	Sega CD: 5.6/10 (Note: In Electronic Gaming Monthly's review of the Sega CD version, three critics scored it 6/10, two 5/10.); SMD: 6/10 (Note: In Electronic Gaming Monthly's review of the Genesis version, three critics scored it 6/10, one 5/10, another 7/10.); SNES: 6.6/10 (Note: In Electronic Gaming Monthly's review of the SNES version, two critics scored it 8/10, two others 6/10, one 5/10.)
Game Players	SMD: 75%
GameFan	SNES: 78% (Note: In GameFan's review of the SNES version, four critics scored it differently: 79%, 76%, 81%, and 76%.)
GameZone	SNES: 85/100
Mean Machines Sega	Sega CD: 46/100; SMD: 73/100
Mega Fun	Sega CD: 20% SMD: 47% SNES: 59%
Nintendo Power	SNES: 2.75/5 (Note: Nintendo Power scored the SNES version 3.1/5 for graphics/sound, 2.4/5 for play control, 2.6/5 for challenge, and 2.9/5 for theme/fun.)
PC Gamer (UK)	PC: 67%
PC Games (DE)	PC: 63%
Super Play	SNES: 77%
Total!	SNES: 79%
Video Games (DE)	GB: 66% SMD: 52% SNES: 64%
VideoGames & Computer Entertainment	SMD: 8/10
PC Review	PC: 5/10

Reviewing the Genesis version, GamePro criticized that the quality of the controls and graphics varies through the game, but praised the game's combination of "above average" run-n-shoot adventure, "hypnotic" first-person flying, and "brain-teasing" puzzles. (Note: GamePro scored the Genesis version 3.5/5 for graphics, 3.5/5 for control, 4/5 for sound, and 4/5 for fun factor.) They also reviewed the Super NES version. (Note: GamePro scored the SNES version 4.5/5 for graphics, 4.5/5 for sound, 4/5 for control, and 5/5 for fun factor.)

GamePro commented that the Sega CD version makes good use of the system's audio and graphical capabilities, but that the puzzle-based gameplay is dull. (Note: GamePro scored the Sega CD version 4/5 for graphics, 4/5 for sound, 3/5 for control, and 3/5 for fun factor.) Electronic Gaming Monthly remarked that "The variety of games is a good option, but the overall appeal of the whole theme seems tired by now."

James V. Trunzo reviewed The Lawnmower Man in White Wolf #47 (September 1994), rating it a 2 out of 5 and stated that "I don't want to blast it, but this game has some serious flaws. Your character is difficult to control, the game and graphics are uneven and – here's an unforgivable one – there's no 'save game' feature. Stephen King panned the movie. I'm panning the game."

In 1996, Computer Gaming World declared Lawnmower Man the 42nd-worst computer game ever released.

== Sequel ==
In late 1995, SCi released a sequel for MS-DOS and Macintosh computers known as CyberWar. It had a limited release by Interplay instead of the publisher of the first game, SCi. CyberWar splits from the story of the second movie, Lawnmower Man 2: Beyond Cyberspace, and has its own story.
