= Virtuosity (film) =

1995 film by Brett Leonard

- Theatrical release poster
- Directed by: Brett Leonard
- Written by: Eric Bernt
- Produced by: Gary Lucchesi
- Starring: Denzel Washington; Russell Crowe; Kelly Lynch; Stephen Spinella; William Forsythe; Louise Fletcher
- Cinematography: Gale Tattersall
- Edited by: Rob Kobrin; B.J. Sears; Billy Weber
- Music by: Christopher Young
- Production company: Gary Lucchesi Productions
- Distributed by: Paramount Pictures
- Release date: August 4, 1995
- Running time: 106 minutes
- Country: United States
- Language: English
- Budget: $30 million
- Box office: $37 million

Virtuosity is a 1995 American science-fiction action film directed by Brett Leonard from a screenplay by Eric Bernt, and starring Denzel Washington, Russell Crowe and Kelly Lynch. The film follows a disgraced ex-cop (Washington) who must hunt down a virtual reality being (Crowe), composited from the personalities of multiple serial killers, who has gained sentience and escaped into the real world.

The film was released by Paramount Pictures on August 4, 1995. It received generally negative reviews, and grossed $37 million worldwide from a $30 million budget.

== Plot ==
In 1999, Parker Barnes is a former Los Angeles police officer imprisoned for killing political terrorist Matthew Grimes, who killed Parker's wife and daughter. Barnes killed Grimes but also accidentally shot two news reporters in the process and was sentenced to 17 years to life.

Barnes and fellow convict John Donovan are testing a virtual reality system designed for training police officers. The two are tracking down a serial killer named SID 6.7 at a Japanese sushi restaurant in virtual reality. SID (short for Sadistic, Intelligent, Dangerous, a VR amalgam of the most violent serial killers throughout history) causes Donovan to go into shock, killing him. The director overseeing the project orders the programmer in charge of creating SID, Dr. Darrel Lindenmeyer, to shut down the project with Commissioner Elizabeth Deane and her associate, William Wallace, as his witnesses.

Following a fight with another prisoner, Barnes meets with criminal psychologist Dr. Madison Carter. Meanwhile, Lindenmeyer informs SID that he is about to be shut down because Donovan's death was caused when SID disabled the fail-safes. At SID's suggestion, Lindenmeyer convinces another employee, Clyde Reilly, that a sexually-compliant virtual reality model, Sheila 3.2, another project created by Lindenmeyer, can be brought to life in a synthetically grown android body. However, Lindenmeyer replaces the Sheila 3.2 module with the SID 6.7 module. Now processed into the real world, SID 6.7 kills Reilly.

Once word gets out of SID being in the real world, Deane and LAPD Chief William Cochran offer Barnes a deal: if he catches SID and brings him back to virtual reality, he will be pardoned. Barnes agrees, and with help from Carter they discover that Grimes is a part of SID 6.7's personality profile. After killing a family along with a group of security guards, SID heads over to the Media Zone, a local nightclub, where he takes hostages. Barnes and Carter go to the nightclub to stop him, but SID escapes.

The next day, SID begins a killing spree at the Los Angeles Olympic Auditorium where a UFC match is taking place. Barnes arrives at the Stadium to capture SID and finds him on a train, where another hostage is being held by SID. Barnes seemingly kills the hostage in front of horrified witnesses and is sent back to prison. Having caught up with Barnes after the incident, Carter tries to prove Barnes's innocence, but Barnes is freed from his prisoner transport by SID, who once again escapes. Wallace and Deane are about to have Barnes terminated via a fail-safe transmitter implanted in his body, but Cochran destroys the system after learning from Carter that Barnes didn't kill the hostage on the train.

SID kidnaps Carter's daughter Karin and takes over a television studio. Lindenmeyer, having come out of hiding, sees what SID is doing and is impressed but is captured by Carter. After a fight on the roof of the studio, Barnes ultimately destroys SID's body but is unable to learn where he hid Karin. They place SID back in VR to trick the location out of him which proves to be one of the fan enclosures on the studio roof. When SID discovers that he is back in virtual reality, he goes into a rage. Cochran lets Carter out of VR, but Lindenmeyer kills Cochran before he can release Barnes. Barnes starts to go into the same shock that Donovan suffered, but Carter kills Lindenmeyer and saves Barnes.

Barnes and Carter return to the building that SID took over in the real world and save Karin from a booby trap set up by SID that's similar to the one that killed Barnes' family. After Karin is saved, Barnes destroys the SID 6.7 module.

== Cast ==
- Denzel Washington as Parker Barnes, who was imprisoned after killing a man who killed his family
- Russell Crowe as SID 6.7, a virtual reality entity who later becomes a regenerating android
- Kelly Lynch as Dr. Madison Carter, a criminal psychologist who teams with Barnes to understand SID's behavior
- Stephen Spinella as Dr. Darrel Lindenmeyer, who created SID 6.7 and Sheila 3.2
- William Forsythe as LAPD Chief Billy Cochran
- Louise Fletcher as LAPD Commissioner Elizabeth Deane
- William Fichtner as William Wallace
- Kevin J. O'Connor as Clyde Reilly
- Costas Mandylor as John Donovan
- Kaley Cuoco as Karin Carter, Madison's daughter
- Christopher Murray as Matthew Grimes
- Mari Morrow as Linda Barnes
- Johnny Kim as Lab Tech
- Heidi Schanz as Sheila 3.2
- Miguel Nájera as Rafael Debaca
- Danny Goldring as John Symes
- Traci Lords as Media Zone singer
- Gordon Jennison Noice as 'Big Red'
- Ahmed Ahmed as Cameraman
- Dustin Nguyen as Reporter
- Michael Buffer as Himself
- Ken Shamrock as Himself (uncredited)

== Production ==
After the success of The Lawnmower Man, director Brett Leonard received a number of virtual reality-based scripts as potential follow-ups, with Leonard rejecting them as they weren't very good and were overly reliant upon cybersex, which he didn't feel could sustain an entire movie. What attracted Leonard to the Virtuosity script was the fact it wasn't overly focused or reliant on virtual reality and would allow him to focus more on action elements and concepts of nanotechnology. Screenwriter Eric Bernt said the inspiration for SID 6.7 came from a trip to Carnegie Mellon University and learned about the institution's artificial intelligence research, citing in particular Joseph Bates' demonstration of The Oz Project: Woggles, which featured several spherical Pac-Man-like creatures moving around a three-dimensional space and interacting with other "woggles" using a preset array of twenty different emotions, with the goal being to incorporate more human characteristics. This served as the foundation for Brent's central concept in which SID 6.7 would be an artificial intelligence for use in a criminal investigation simulation for training police, only for SID's intelligence to drive him to look for a way out of virtual reality. In regards to Stephen Spinella as SID's creator Dr. Darrel Lindenmeyer, Brent compared him to Dr. Frankenstein in that he's obsessed with protecting his creation regardless of the consequences.

Washington restructured much of the story and dialogue during filming, entirely removing a romantic subtext between the Lt. Barnes and Dr. Carter characters from the original script.

Principal photography for the film began on January 25, 1995. Parts of the film were filmed at the abandoned Hughes Aircraft plant in Los Angeles.

== Music ==
Virtuosity: Original Motion Picture Soundtrack

Soundtrack album by Various artists
- Released: August 1, 1995
- Genres: Electronic, alternative rock, trip hop, synth-pop
- Length: 71:05
- Label: Radioactive

The soundtrack was released on MCA imprint Radioactive Records and contained music from Peter Gabriel, The Heads, Tricky and Live, among others.

An album containing the complete score by Christopher Young was released on July 26, 2019, on Intrada Records. A promo CD had previously been released. Producer Gary Lucchesi hired Young after previously working with him on Jennifer 8. Much of Young's score is electronic-influenced while the last third of the film utilizes an orchestra.

== Reception ==
=== Box office ===
The film grossed $24 million in the United States and Canada and $37 million worldwide.

=== Critical response ===
The film received generally negative reviews. On the review aggregator website Rotten Tomatoes, 28% of 39 critics' reviews are positive. The website's consensus reads: "Woefully deficient in thrills or common sense, Virtuosity strands its talented stars in a story whose vision of the future is depressingly short on imagination." Metacritic, which uses a weighted average, assigned the film a score of 39 out of 100, based on 17 critics, indicating "generally unfavorable" reviews. Audiences polled by CinemaScore gave it a B− grade.

Mick LaSalle of the San Francisco Chronicle wrote: "The presence of Washington lends the picture a much-needed dose of authenticity. But in the end Virtuosity is disconnected and uninvolving." Conversely, Roger Ebert gave the film a positive review. He gave it 3 out of 4 stars and wrote that the movie was "filled with bright ideas and fresh thinking" and "still finds surprises" despite a somewhat clichéd premise.

The film was nominated for Best Picture at the Sitges Film Festival, losing to Citizen X.

== Novelization ==
In 1995, a novelization of the film by author Terry Bisson was published by Pocket.

== See also ==
- American Gangster, 2007 film starring Washington and Crowe in switched antagonist/protagonist roles
- Simulated reality
