= Vassago =

Fallen angel and Goetic demon

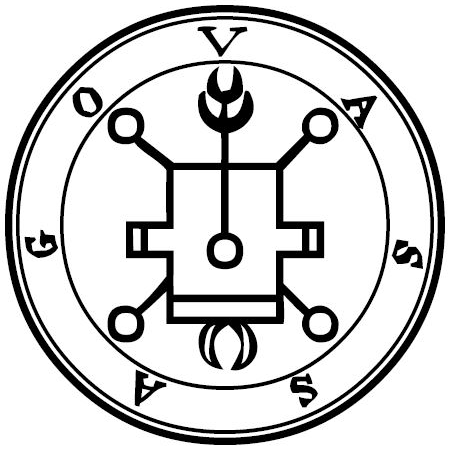

Vassago (also Vasago, Usagoo) is a demon described in demonological grimoires such as the Lesser Key of Solomon and the Book of the Office of Spirits.

== Lesser Key of Solomon ==
He is the third demon in the Ars Goetia contained in the Lesser Key (including Thomas Rudd's variant) and is referred to as a prince "of a good nature" and of the "same nature as Agares". He rules twenty-six legions of spirits, and is summoned to tell magicians of past and future events, and locate lost objects. He is one of the few spirits found in the Lesser Key of Solomon but not in Johann Weyer's Pseudomonarchia Daemonum.

According to Rudd, Vassago is opposed by the Shemhamphorasch angel Sitael.

== Other works ==
Vassago is mentioned in the Book of the Office of Spirits as Usagoo, appearing as an angel, "just and true in all his doings," with the powers of inciting the love of women and revealing hidden treasures, in addition to ruling twenty spirits. Sloane MS 3824 mentions Vassago in invocations to summon spirits that guard treasure, and in the "Experiment of Vassago" and the "Experiment of Agares," both intended to capture the named spirits in crystals.

Vassago is mentioned in the novel Hideaway by Dean Koontz, and in its film adaptation.

Murderer and vampire-themed cult leader Rod Ferrell used "Vassago" as a "vampire name" and burned a V representing this alias onto his victims; Ferrell did not know how to spell or pronounce Vassago's name correctly, and typically called himself "Vesago".

Vassago appears as a character in the animated web series Helluva Boss (voiced by Harvey Guillén), alongside some other Goetia demons like Paimon, Stolas and Andrealphus.

A Vassago enemy appears in the Legacy of Rust expansion for the video game Doom II, where they appear as large, goatlike demons. and in Playstation 2's Castlevania: Lament of Innocence as an enemy.
