= Lady in White =

1988 American mystery film

- Theatrical release poster
- Directed by: Frank LaLoggia
- Written by: Frank LaLoggia
- Produced by: Frank LaLoggia; Andrew G. La Marca
- Starring: Lukas Haas; Len Cariou; Alex Rocco; Katherine Helmond
- Cinematography: Russell Carpenter
- Edited by: Steve Mann
- Music by: Frank LaLoggia
- Production company: New Sky Communications
- Distributed by: New Century Vista Film Company
- Release dates: January 2, 1988 (Dryden Theatre); April 22, 1988 (United States)
- Running time: 113 minutes (Note: The film's original theatrical cut runs 113 minutes in length. A 117-minute director's cut, and a 126-minute extended director's cut also exist, and were released on Blu-ray by Scream Factory in 2016.)
- Country: United States
- Languages: English; Italian
- Budget: $4.7 million
- Box office: $1.7 million

Lady in White is a 1988 American supernatural horror film directed, produced, written and scored by Frank LaLoggia, and starring Lukas Haas, Len Cariou, Alex Rocco, and Katherine Helmond. Set in 1962 upstate New York, it follows a schoolboy (Haas) who, after witnessing the ghost of a young girl, becomes embroiled in a mystery surrounding a series of brutal child murders.

LaLoggia's second feature film after Fear No Evil (1981), Lady in White was independently funded by him through a penny stock company he formed with his cousin, Charles LaLoggia. Principal photography occurred in Lyons, New York in the fall of 1986. The story is based on a version of The Lady in White legend, concerning a woman who supposedly searches for her daughter in Durand-Eastman Park in Rochester, New York, from where the director hails.

Despite positive reviews from critics, the film was a box office bomb. It later earned status as a cult film.

== Plot ==
On Halloween 1962, nine-year-old Frankie Scarlatti is locked inside his classroom coatroom by schoolmates Donald and Louie at the end of the day. Trapped well after dark, he witnesses the apparition of a young girl being murdered in the coatroom, though her assailant is invisible. Moments later, a man enters the coatroom and attempts to open a vent grate on the floor, but notices Frankie and strangles him to unconsciousness. In a near-death vision, Frankie again sees the girl, who asks for his help to find her mother. Frankie is revived by his father, Angelo, and rushed to the hospital, while the school janitor, Harold "Willy" Williams, found drunk in his office, is arrested as he was on school grounds at the time of the assault, not helped by Frankie having been unable to clearly see his attacker's face.

As Frankie recovers at home, his brother, Geno, shows him a newspaper article about the attack. He learns it is linked to eleven killings, all apparently by a serial killer targeting children. Frankie learns the ghostly girl is Melissa Ann Montgomery, suspected to be the same killer's first victim, who continues to appear to Frankie and they form a tenuous friendship. Striving to help Melissa, Frankie returns to the coatroom and removes the cover of the net to discover several dust-laden objects, including toys, a hair clip, and a high school class ring. Later, he overhears the chief of police telling Angelo that the case against the janitor is crumbling and that the coatroom is also the scene of Melissa's murder. After considering this new information, Frankie confides in Phil, a family friend, that the class ring likely belongs to the killer and that he thinks the killer returned to the coatroom to retrieve it as the school's heating system was being replaced. Unbeknownst to Frankie, the ring, which had accidentally fallen out of his pocket earlier, was found by Geno and hidden away again.

Later, Donald and Louie lure Frankie out to the nearby cliffs, where they encounter a ghostly lady dressed in white. All three boys take off running and Frankie collides into Geno in the surrounding woods. Frankie tries to explain the link between Melissa, the attacker and the lady in white, but is unsuccessful. One evening, Melissa appears to both Geno and Frankie. The town clock begins to chime and Frankie realizes that her nightly death re-enactment is about to commence. They follow her ghost to the school then wait until her lifeless body reappears, which is carried by an invisible figure from the school and onto the cliffs. At the last minute, Melissa awakes and begins screaming as she is thrown over the cliffs. A pale, blond woman dressed in white then comes out of the cottage. Upon seeing Melissa's lifeless body on the rocks below, she flings herself off the cliff, plunging to her death. The ghostly scene ends and the brothers head home. Finally, Frankie understands the source of Melissa's anguish and he vows to help her bring her killer to justice.

A grand jury fails to indict Willy due to insufficient evidence. Outside the courthouse, the distraught mother of one of the murdered children shoots and kills him. Researching the class ring, Geno examines one of Angelo's old yearbooks and realizes that he and the killer wore the same type of class rings. The yearbook reveals that the initials on the ring, "MPT", belong to Michael P. Terragrossa. Geno quickly deduces that the "P" stands for Phillip—as in their family friend Phil—and he rushes to tell his father. Frankie happens to be with Phil at that same time, and realizes Phil is the killer after he begins whistling "Did You Ever See a Dream Walking?", Melissa's song. Phil realizes that Frankie has deduced his secret and attacks him, but Frankie escapes and runs to the cliffs. Phil catches him and confesses to the murders just before he starts to strangle Frankie again. Suddenly, Phil is struck from behind and they both collapse to the ground.

Regaining consciousness, Frankie finds himself in Melissa's old cottage with an older woman, Amanda Harper, illuminated by hundreds of candles. He learns that Amanda was the one who saved him from Phil, and that she was the lady in white Frankie saw earlier. Amanda reveals that she is Melissa's aunt and has been living in the cottage since the deaths of her sister and niece. Without warning, Phil strangles Amanda and beats her to death, setting the building ablaze in the process. Pulling Frankie from the burning cottage, Phil attempts to throw him over the cliff. However, Frankie drops safely to the ground when the ghostly lady in white suddenly appears and frightens Phil, causing him to tumble over the cliff's edge. Melissa emerges from the burning cottage and the two ghosts happily reunite, ascending into the sky in a cascade of light. As Frankie crawls away from the ledge, Phil grabs his ankle. Angelo, Geno, and the police arrive as Frankie screams for his father. Angelo rips Phil's hand off Frankie and pulls Frankie away from him. Angelo then tries to save Phil, but overcome with shame, Phil lets go and falls to his death. Everyone watches the cottage burn to the ground as the snow begins to fall.

== Cast ==
- Lukas Haas as Franklin J. "Frankie" Scarlatti
- Len Cariou as Michael Phillip "Phil" Terragrossa
- Alex Rocco as Angelo Rodolfo Scarlatti
- Katherine Helmond as Amanda Harper
- Jason Presson as Geno Scarlatti
- Henry Harris as Harold "Willy" Williams
- Renata Vanni as Mama Assunta
- Angelo Bertolini as Papa Charlie
- Joelle Jacobi as Melissa Anne Montgomery
- Jared Rushton as Donald
- Lucy Lee Flippin a Grace La Della
- Tom Bower as Sheriff Saunders
- Sydney Lassick as Mr. Lowry
- Gregory Levinson as Louie
- Karen Powell as Anne Montgomery (Melissa's mother/"Lady in White")
- Rita Zohar as Agnes Cilak
- Rose Weaver as Matty Williams

== Production ==
=== Development ===
LaLoggia partly based the screenplay of the film on The Lady in White legend, regarding a woman who supposedly searches for her lost daughter in Durand-Eastman Park in Rochester, New York, LaLoggia's hometown.

The film was entirely financed through a penny stock offering, New Sky Communications, a public company set-up by LaLoggia and his cousin Charles M. LaLoggia, traded initially on NASDAQ for 10 cents a share. It was the first and only occasion that a single, feature film was financed in this manner. After producing a 7-minute promotional reel for the project, New Sky Communications was able to secure $4.7 million from 4,000 investors.

"Charlie came to me and said 'Look, we may be able to do this again [raise money independently] if we go public.' He said that there was a possibility we could structure a penny stock offering to raise the money to make another film. It took us quite a while to structure this public entity called New Sky Communications. We had a number of brokers around the country selling stock for Lady and it took us about three years, from beginning to end, to bring Lady in White to fruition."

=== Filming ===
Prior to filming, Frank and Charles LaLoggia meticulously storyboarded every scene prior to the shoot, forgoing a standard practice like a completion bond insuring against budget overages. Principal photography of Lady in White began on September 29, 1986, in Lyons and Sodus, New York. Additional photography also took place at the former Phelps High School and later Middle School, also Resthaven Cemetery behind the School, also Raleigh Studios in Los Angeles. Filming was officially completed on January 10, 1987.

== Release ==
The LaLoggias managed to recoup the film's budget before the film had even hit theaters. They sold the foreign rights to Samuel Goldwyn Productions for a $1 million advance and 70% of all foreign sales bringing their foreign earnings to over $2.7 million. New Century Vista acquired the film for U.S. theatrical distribution, guaranteeing $1 million in prints and ads to promote and open the picture.

Following local screenings at the Dryden Theatre in Rochester's George Eastman Museum on January 2, 1988, a reception was held at the museum on January 4, 1988, with cast and crew in attendance. These initial screenings served as fundraisers for the museum as well as a local Rochester AIDS organization.

Lady in White premiered in the United States on April 22, 1988, in 90 theaters in Los Angeles and Chicago. The film was dropped by a number of Southern California theaters after its first week of screening due to average attendance and a glut of films that were on the market competing for screens before it opened in New York City on May 13, 1988, and expanded to a wide theatrical release on May 20, 1988.

The film screened at the London Film Festival on November 17, 1988.

=== Home media ===
The film was first introduced to the home video market on VHS and Betamax by Virgin Vision (who acquired home media rights at a cost of $2 million) and later by Anchor Bay on October 15, 1993. It was also released on LaserDisc and DVD through Elite Entertainment, who released a Director's Cut with an extended 4 minutes on March 25, 1998. The director's cut was reissued on DVD by Metro-Goldwyn-Mayer on September 20, 2005, and featured bonus materials including 36 minutes of deleted footage and commentary from director Frank LaLoggia.

In 2016, Scream Factory issued a Blu-ray edition of the film featuring the original 113-minute theatrical cut, the previously released director's cut, and a never-before-seen extended director's cut running 127 minutes. Sandpiper Pictures reissued a Blu-ray edition on September 3, 2024. In July 2026, Vinegar Syndrome released a four-disc 4K UHD Blu-ray and standard Blu-ray combination set featuring three cuts of the film, with the director's cut featured on a 4K disc.

== Reception ==
=== Box office ===
By the end of its theatrical run, Lady in White had grossed a total of $1.7 million in the United States.

=== Critical response ===
The film has had a mostly positive critical response focusing on the stylish small-town vibe and suspense without gore. Writing in the Chicago Sun-Times, Roger Ebert stated: "Lady in White, like most good films, depends more on style and tone than it does on story, and after awhile [sic] it's the whole insidious atmosphere of the film that begins to envelop us...We have been this way before in countless other movies, but not often with so much style, atmosphere and believable human nature." The New York Times critic Caryn James praised the film stating that: "Here are the bones of an ordinary ghost story. But the writer and director Frank LaLoggia brings them to life with exceptional vitality... The extended Scarlatti family—warm, funny, so real they make the characters in Moonstruck seem like impostors... Mr. LaLoggia creates an unusual, effective child's-eye-view of a sinister wide world, a restless afterlife, and the comforts of family." Newsweek's David Ansen wrote: "Lady in White is uncommonly ambitious and daringly eclectic...who needs big stars and $20 million special effects when you've got a good yarn to spin and a storyteller who trusts his tale? Gather round the campfire and enjoy."

Pauline Kael wrote, in The New Yorker: "Lady in White is a ghost movie with an overcomplicated plot but it has a poetic feeling that makes up for much of the clutter...and there are touches that charm you: the piles of candy corn in the window of the Kandy Kitchen; the pack of dogs that chase after bicyclists but are turned back by a nun's basilisk glare...and there's endearing, giggly tom foolery between Frankie and his older brother (Jason Presson). Laloggia puts on a good show."

Peter Travers for People Magazine wrote: "This one is going to scare you senseless. Bone chilling and unexpectedly moving

"Wonderful and potent... an enthralling movie experience," said The Hollywood Reporter.

Variety wrote: "Lady in White is a superb supernatural horror film from independent filmmaker Frank LaLoggia...This probably is as good a nightmare as any impressionable boy could have and still be suspenseful enough to get most adults’ hearts going."

On the review aggregator website Rotten Tomatoes, 67% of 18 critics' reviews are positive. Metacritic, which uses a weighted average, assigned the film a score of 70 out of 100, based on 16 critics, indicating "generally favorable" reviews.

=== Awards and nominations ===
Institution	Year	Category	Recipient	Result	Ref.
Fantasporto	1989	Best Film	Frank LaLoggia	Nominated	
Saturn Awards	1990	Best Supporting Actress	Katherine Helmond	Nominated	
Saturn Awards	1990	Best Performance by a Younger Actor	Lukas Haas	Nominated	
Young Artist Awards	1989	Best Young Actor in a Horror or Mystery Motion Picture	Lukas Haas	Won	
Young Artist Awards	1989	Teenage Choice for Best Horror Motion Picture	Lady in White	Nominated	

The film was selected as "an outstanding film of the year for presentation" at the 1988 London Film Festival and won Best Film and the Audience Award at The Festival of Imagination in Clermont-Ferrand, France that same year.

== See also ==
- List of ghost films
- List of films set around Halloween
- Urban legends
- Bing Crosby – who sang the version of "Did You Ever See a Dream Walking?" as heard on the film

== Sources ==
- Leafe, David (1990). British Film Institute Film and Television Handbook 1991. London, England: British Film Institute. ISBN 978-0-851-70277-3.
- Maltin, Leonard (2003). Leonard Maltin's Movie and Video Guide. New York City, New York: Plume. ISBN 978-0-451-20649-7.
- McCarty, John (1990). The Modern Horror Film: 50 Contemporary Classics from "The Curse of Frankenstein" to "The Lair of the White Worm". Secaucus, New Jersey: Carol Publishing Group. ISBN 978-0-806-51164-1.
