= Lawnmower Man 2: Beyond Cyberspace =

1996 film by Farhad Mann

- Theatrical release poster
- Directed by: Farhad Mann
- Screenplay by: Farhad Mann
- Story by: Farhad Mann; Michael Miner
- Based on: Characters by Stephen King
- Produced by: Keith Fox; Edward Simons
- Starring: Patrick Bergin; Matt Frewer; Austin O'Brien; Ely Pouget; Camille Cooper; Kevin Conway
- Cinematography: Ward Russell
- Edited by: James D. Mitchell; Joel Goodman
- Music by: Robert Folk
- Production companies: Allied Visions; Lane Pringle Productions; August Entertainment; Savoy Pictures; Fuji Eight Co., Ltd.
- Distributed by: New Line Cinema (U.S.); First Independent Films (U.K.); Victor/Herald (Japan)
- Release dates: January 12, 1996 (U.S. & Brazil); March 29, 1996 (U.K.); November 16, 1996 (Japan)
- Running time: 93 minutes
- Country: United States; United Kingdom; Japan
- Language: English
- Budget: $15 million
- Box office: $2.4 million

Lawnmower Man 2: Beyond Cyberspace (also subtitled Jobe's War) is a 1996 American science-fiction action film written and directed by Farhad Mann, and starring Matt Frewer, Patrick Bergin, Austin O'Brien, and Ely Pouget. It is the sequel to the 1992 film The Lawnmower Man. The film was negatively reviewed by both critics and general audience.

== Plot ==
The founder of virtual reality, Dr. Benjamin Trace, has lost a legal battle to secure a patent on the most powerful worldwide communications chip ever invented. Touted as the one operating system to control all others, in the wrong hands the "Chiron Chip" has the potential to dominate a society dependent on computers. When corporate tycoon and virtual reality entrepreneur Jonathan Walker takes over the development of the Chiron Chip, he and his team discover Jobe Smith barely alive after the destruction of Virtual Space Industries. After having his face reconstructed and his legs amputated, they hook him up to their database to have him help perfect the Chiron Chip.

Six years later, a now 16-year-old Peter Parkette is a computer hacker living in the subways of a cyberpunk Los Angeles with a group of other runaway teens. While hooked into Cyberspace, Jobe reconnects with Peter and asks him to find Trace for him. Peter locates Trace living in a desert and brings him to his hideout to speak with Jobe. Jobe shows Trace his newly constructed cyber-world and asks about the Egypt link, a hidden Nano routine in the Chiron Chip's design. Trace refuses to tell him, noting that Jobe is insane and would not understand its power. Enraged, Jobe hacks into the subway system's computer to send another train crashing into the one Trace and the teenagers are in, but Trace causes the runaway train to crash into a construction site instead.

Walker and his team at "Virtual Light Industries" plan on announcing the functions of the chip and its virtual city to the public and world leaders, though Walker wants to use them for spying and blackmail. He uses Jobe to deal with anything that could stop him, such as crashing a plane carrying a senator who is opposed to the launch and killing anyone who gets too close to the truth through virtual reality. Trace, Peter, and the others make an attempt to break into Virtual Light to steal the chip but are nearly killed by Jobe before they are rescued by Dr. Cori Platt, Trace's former partner and lover.

After stealing the Chiron Chip, they find it is a decoy. Walker keeps the real chip in his office and the launch of the chip seems inevitable. Jobe begins causing havoc through the chip by accessing credit accounts, ATM machines, and water and power utilities in an attempt to destroy the world so that everyone may join and follow him as a virtual messiah. Walker attempts to stop Jobe but is gunned down by his own security.

The group returns to Virtual Light Industries. Trace explains that the Egypt link is a dam function designed to prevent "ultimate power". Jobe has built around the link without knowing its purpose. Trace and the others confront Jobe in his virtual city, in an attempt to get him roused enough to overpower himself. "Egypt" kicks in, destroying the virtual city and reducing Jobe to his original intellectually disabled persona. Peter goes to see Jobe before a wounded Walker takes Peter hostage in an attempt to bargain for the chip. Jobe distracts Walker long enough for Trace to strike him, causing him to land on exposed wiring that kills him. Peter and the others collect Jobe as they go home.

== Cast ==
- Patrick Bergin as Dr. Benjamin Trace
- Matt Frewer as Jobe Smith
- Austin O'Brien as Peter Parkette
  - Trever O'Brien as young Peter
- Ely Pouget as Dr. Cori Platt
- Kevin Conway as Jonathan Walker
- Camille Cooper as Jennifer
- Patrick LaBrecque as Shawn
- Crystal Celeste Grant as Jade
- Sean P. Young as Travis
- Mathew Valencia as Homeless Kid
- Richard Fancy as Senator Greenspan
- Ellis Williams as Chief of Security
- Castulo Guerra as Guillermo
- Molly Shannon as Homeless Lady
- Ralph Ahn as Doctor

== Production ==
In February 1993, it was reported New Line Cinema and August Entertainment were developing a sequel to The Lawnmower Man. The initial development for the sequel began under the working title of CyberJob and centered around Jeff Fahey's return as Jobe Smith. The CyberJob incarnation of the script was then abandoned in favor of an ambitious scientist repeating Dr. Angelo's experiments on a new group of subjects who are then set loose upon the cyber network. In May 1994, it was reported Allied Visions had set Lawnmower Man II with Pierce Brosnan set to reprise his role as Dr. Lawrence Angelo with Farhad Mann directing from a script by Brett Leonard and Gimel Everett of the first film. Two months later however, it was reported that Brosnan had been cast as James Bond for GoldenEye.

The first Lawnmower Man had been New Line Cinema's highest grossing theatrical release of 1992 and a sequel had been initially advertised with the title Lawnmower Man 2: Mindfire on the 1993 VHS releases of the first film. Filming for the sequel commenced in March 1995 in Los Angeles with only Austin O'Brien returning from the original. Pierce Brosnan was initially asked to return as well but was unavailable due to the production of GoldenEye; this led to the hiring of Patrick Bergin as Dr. Benjamin Trace. Original director Brett Leonard was directing Virtuosity at the same time and did not return to helm the sequel to his original film.

Filming took place between September and December of 1994.

== Release ==
The film was theatrically released on January 12, 1996. A home video release followed on June 11, 1996.

== Reception ==
Lawnmower Man 2 was poorly received by critics, with an 18% rating on Rotten Tomatoes, based on 11 reviews, with an average rating of 3.5/10. The plot and characters were generally negatively received, while the visual effects received mixed reviews.

== Cancelled sequels ==
Grant Morrison was asked to develop outlines for potential third and fourth Lawnmower Man films as the producer liked Morrison's work on Doom Patrol.

In 2020, Brett Leonard the director of the first Lawnmower Man film announced plans for a new sequel dubbed "L-Man Reborn". The name change is due to legal reasons.
