= Elizabeth Hoffman (actress) =

American actress (1926–2023)

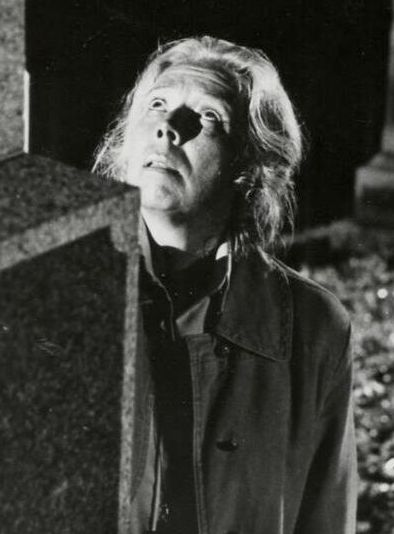
- Hoffman in Fear No Evil (1981)
- Born: February 8, 1926; Corvallis, Oregon, U.S.
- Died: August 21, 2023 (aged 97); Malibu, California, U.S.
- Occupation: Actress
- Years active: 1980–1998
- Children: 2

Elizabeth Hoffman (February 8, 1926 – August 21, 2023) was an American actress. She was best known for her regular role as Beatrice Reed Ventnor (mother of the sisters played by Swoosie Kurtz, Sela Ward, Patricia Kalember and Julianne Phillips) on the NBC drama series Sisters (1991–1996).

== Early life ==
Elizabeth Hoffman was born in Corvallis, Oregon on February 8, 1926.

== Career ==
Hoffman first appeared on television in a recurring role on Little House on the Prairie (1980–1981) before making her feature film debut in Frank LaLoggia's supernatural horror film Fear No Evil (1981), being cast in a leading role. In 1983, Hoffman portrayed Eleanor Roosevelt in Dan Curtis's historical miniseries The Winds of War. She had a supporting role opposite Barbra Streisand in the drama Nuts (1987), and subsequently reprised her role as Eleanor Roosevelt in the miniseries War and Remembrance in 1988.

Hoffman next appeared in Monte Hellman's horror film Silent Night, Deadly Night 3: Better Watch Out! (1989). From 1991 to 1996, she portrayed Beatrice Reed Ventnor, mother of the titular sister characters played by actresses Swoosie Kurtz, Sela Ward, Patricia Kalember and Julianne Phillips) on the drama series Sisters.

Hoffman guest-starred in a number of television shows and mini-series such as Little House on the Prairie, War and Remembrance, Matlock and thirtysomething, and well as several movies including playing "Grandma Ruth" in Dante's Peak. She also played the role of Catherine Langford in 2 episodes of Stargate SG-1.

== Personal life ==
Hoffman had two sons.

== Death ==
Hoffman died at her home in Malibu, California on August 21, 2023, at the age of 97.

== Filmography ==
=== Film ===
Year	Title	Role	Notes	Ref.
1981	Fear No Evil	Mikhail/Margaret Buchanan		
1985	Do You Remember Love	Lila	Television film	
1987	Nuts	Dr. Johnson		
1989	Elvis and Me	Mother Superior		
1989	Silent Night, Deadly Night 3: Better Watch Out!	Granny		
1989	Born on the Fourth of July	Passerby		
1991	The Great Pretender	Rose Outland		
1994	The River Wild	Gail's Mother		
1995	Superfights	Runner		
1997	Dante's Peak	Ruth		

=== Television ===
Year	Title	Role	Notes	Ref.
1980–1981	Little House on the Prairie	Miss Mason	3 episodes	
1982	The Greatest American Hero	Margaret Detwiller	1 episode	
1983	The Winds of War	Eleanor Roosevelt	Miniseries	
1983	The A-Team	Mother Superior	1 episode	
1984	Blue Thunder	Mrs. Moynihan	1 episode	
1985	Hunter	Mrs. Thelma Atkins	1 episode	
1988	Roseanne	Beverly Harris	1 episode (Unaired pilot)	
1989	L.A. Law	Jeanne Rubens	1 episode	
1988–1989	War and Remembrance	Eleanor Roosevelt	Miniseries	
1989	Star Trek: The Next Generation	Premier Bhavani	Episode: "The Price"	
1989–1990	Matlock	Judge Mary Russell	5 episodes	
1989–1991	Thirtysomething	Eleanor Krieger	5 episodes	
1991–1996	Sisters	Beatrice 'Bea' Reed Ventnor	127 episodes	
1997–1998	Stargate SG-1	Catherine Langford	3 episodes "Torment of Tantalus", "There But For The Grace Of God", "Out of Mind" as flashback	
