= The Dead Pit =

1989 film by Brett Leonard

- Theatrical release poster
- Directed by: Brett Leonard
- Written by: Brett Leonard; Gimel Everett
- Produced by: Gimel Everett
- Starring: Jeremy Slate; Cheryl Lawson; Stephen Gregory Foster; Danny Gochnauer
- Cinematography: Marty Collins
- Edited by: Brett Leonard; Gimel Everett
- Music by: Dan Wyman
- Production company: Cornerstone Productions
- Distributed by: Imperial Entertainment (VHS)
- Release date: 1989
- Running time: 95 minutes
- Country: United States
- Language: English

The Dead Pit is a 1989 American horror film co-written and directed by Brett Leonard, in his directorial debut. Cheryl Lawson stars as a mental patient who must defeat an undead serial killer who previously worked at the asylum, played by Danny Gochnauer.

== Plot ==
Dr. Ramzi, a brilliant yet insane doctor, has been running horrible experiments on his patients in an effort to master death, being killed and buried in the basement of a mental health facility. Twenty years later, the hospital is running again and Jane Doe arrives at the institute. Upon her arrival, a major earthquake rocks the building. Jane insists that there are patients in the basement that need help but isn't taken seriously. In the following days she befriends fellow patients and undergoes hypnosis that reveals that she and her mother changed their names to escape her father.

As the film progresses Dr. Ramzi comes back as an undead entity and uses his powers to manipulate inmates and kill staff. Jane also has the revelation that she is the daughter of Dr. Ramzi, as her mother was rightfully terrified of him. He ultimately uses his powers to raise the dead patients as zombies.

== Cast ==
- Jeremy Slate as Dr. Gerald Swan
- Cheryl Lawson as Jane Doe
- Stephen Gregory Foster as Christian Meyers
- Danny Gochnauer as Dr. Ramzi

== Production ==
Filming took place at Agnew's Development Center in Santa Clara, California. Ken Kesey had previously used this as the setting for One Flew Over the Cuckoo's Nest.

== Release ==
The United States premiere was in October 1989.

=== Home video ===
- The original US VHS release from Imperial Entertainment housed the film in a relief cover that lit up the eyes of the main zombie when a button was pushed. This version was released in cut R and unrated director's cuts.
- The US company Code Red DVD released the film on DVD June 17, 2008. Special features include commentaries from Brett Leonard and late actor Jeremy Slate as well as an interview with Cheryl Lawson, the original theatrical trailer, and other trailers for upcoming Code Red releases. The version released by Code Red is an unrated director's cut, featuring six additional minutes of cut footage.
- Code Red released the film on Blu-ray, in association with Dark Force Entertainment, on July 4, 2019. Two separate sets are available with different artwork, while both sets contain a slipcover. It also includes a new 2K restoration with extensive scene-by-scene correction, while it features the same cast and crew interview as the DVD, excluding all other special features.

== Reception ==
Fangoria included the film in its 101 Best Horror Movies You've Never Seen, where they wrote, "This serious attempt at horror never quite hits its mark, evolving into a series of gory laughs, which is what is so endearing about it." Drive-In critic Joe Bob Briggs gave the film four stars (his highest rating) and praised lead Cheryl Lawson's screaming ability. Steve Barton of Dread Central rated it 2.5/5 stars and wrote, "For me, Dead Pit is more than a guilty pleasure. It's a movie so bad that it's hard not to enjoy it." Marc Patterson of Brutal as Hell called it "low budget filmmaking at its finest". Bill Gibron of DVD Talk rated it 2/5 stars and described it as "a simple slasher film upended by a Lucio Fulci inspired unnecessary unleashing of the living dead". In The Zombie Movie Encyclopedia, academic Peter Dendle wrote, "Leonard's uninvolving psychological horror revels in shock effects and disrupted narrative logic, poured into the tired dreamworld and asylum settings of Nightmare on Elm Street and Hellbound."
