= Man-Thing (film) =

2005 supernatural horror movie directed by Brett Leonard

- DVD cover
- Genre: Monster; Superhero
- Based on: Man-Thing by: Stan Lee; Roy Thomas; Gerry Conway; Gray Morrow
- Written by: Hans Rodionoff
- Directed by: Brett Leonard
- Starring: Matthew Le Nevez; Rachael Taylor; Jack Thompson
- Music by: Roger Mason
- Countries of origin: Australia; United States
- Original language: English

Production
- Producers: Avi Arad; Christopher Petzel; Scott Karol; Gimel Everett
- Cinematography: Steve Arnold
- Editor: Martin Connor
- Running time: 97 minutes
- Production companies: Marvel Enterprises; Fierce Entertainment; Screenland Movieworld
- Budget: $5 million

Original release
- Network: Sci Fi Channel
- Release: April 30, 2005

Man-Thing is a 2005 superhero monster film loosely based on the Marvel Comics superhero of the same name. Directed by Brett Leonard and written by Hans Rodionoff, it stars Matthew Le Nevez, Rachael Taylor, and Jack Thompson, with Conan Stevens portraying the title character. The film follows a Louisiana sheriff (Le Nevez) as he investigates a series of deaths in a swamp, leading to him encountering a Seminole legend come to life, the Man-Thing, a shambling swamp-monster whose touch burns those who feel fear.

Originally intended for a theatrical release in the United States, the film premiered on the Sci Fi Channel on April 30, 2005. The film received negative reviews from critics and was a box-office bomb, grossing out $1 million from a small release in international theaters.

== Plot ==
At Dark Waters, a Native American sacred land containing an enigmatic swamp spirit, a teenager is murdered by a plant-like monster. The following day, young replacement sheriff Kyle Williams reaches Bywater and meets with deputy sheriff Fraser, who tells him the previous sheriff is among 47 missing persons since oil tycoon Fred Schist bought the ancient tribal lands from shaman and Seminole chieftain Ted Sallis, the first to disappear. Schist claimed that Sallis had sold the lands legally and then escaped with the money. Schist then asked the sheriff for help: local protesters opposed his perfectly legal activities, and mestizo scoundrel Rene Laroque was sabotaging his facilities. Williams investigates this while trying to find an explanation for the missing people, some of whom were found brutally murdered with plants growing from inside their bodies. Photographer Mike Ploog and shaman Pete Horn tell Williams local legends about the guardian spirit, suggesting that it could be real.

As sabotage and murder continue, Williams investigates the swamp with Fraser and finds the previous sheriff's corpse. Medical examiner Val Mayerik admits that the previous sheriff had ordered him to file the deaths as alligator attacks, even if Mayerik believed otherwise.

Williams and Fraser try to track Laroque, who lives in the swamp, by using a canoe. At the same time, Schist sends the Thibadeux brothers, local thugs, to track and murder Laroque. The monster in the swamp finds the Thibadeux and kills them. Williams is ensnared by Laroque, who admits having helped Schist buy the lands. Laroque claims that Sallis was opposed to the sale; Laroque insists that the guardian spirit would keep on murdering until Schist stops desecrating the sacred swamp. Fraser tries to help Laroque, but the Man-Thing appears and murders Fraser; Laroque knocks Williams down and escapes. Williams wakes up and finds Ploog, who has blurry pictures of the monster; the sheriff seizes the photographs and forbids Ploog from coming back to the swamp.

The following day, Williams interviews Horn and Schist with the help of schoolteacher Teri Richards. Williams starts having romantic feelings for Richards. Horn goes to the swamp and tries to stop the Man-Thing with prayers and sacrifices his own life. The monster kills Horn, but is not otherwise affected by his efforts. That night, Mayerik autopsies the old sheriff and finds a bullet. He tries to tell Williams, but he is back at the swamp, unreachable. Mayerik tells Richards, and she goes to the swamp to tell Williams. Meanwhile, Ploog had returned to the swamp, trying to get a picture of the monster. Instead, he startles Schist, who was in the swamp to murder Laroque. Schist shoots and kills Ploog. Soon afterward, Laroque ambushes and defeats Schist's son and minion, Jake.

Williams finds Ploog's corpse and reasons that Schist murdered Ploog. He then meets Richards, who tells him about Mayerik's autopsy. Williams concludes that Schist is guilty of several murders, trying to incriminate Laroque simply to avoid punishment. According to Schist's confession to Laroque, he murdered Sallis and buried him in Dark Waters. Due to the magic embedded in the soil, Sallis returned as the Man-Thing. Richards reveals that she can guide Williams to Laroque's lair, but the Man-Thing starts chasing them. He chases them to the drilling tower at Dark Waters. In the tower, Schist is leveling his weapon at Laroque in an attempt to prevent Laroque from blowing it away with dynamite. Laroque nonetheless tries to detonate his bomb and is shot and wounded by Schist; Schist then wounds Williams.

However, the Man-Thing arrives and brutally murders Schist by filling his body with oil. The Man-Thing then moves toward Williams and Richards. Laroque sacrifices himself, shouting at the monster and blowing the bomb. The monster survives the flames, but then is absorbed back into the land, allowing Williams and Richards to leave unharmed.

== Cast ==
- Matthew Le Nevez as Sheriff Kyle Williams
- Rachael Taylor as Teri Elizabeth Richards
- Jack Thompson as Frederick Schist
- Rawiri Paratene as Peter Horn
- Alex O'Loughlin as Deputy Eric Fraser
- Steve Bastoni as Rene LaRoque
- Robert Mammone as Mike Ploog
- Pat Thompson as Jake Schist
- William Zappa as Steve Gerber
- John Batchelor as Wayne Thibadeaux
- Ian Bliss as Rodney Thibadeaux
- Brett Leonard as Val Mayerick
- Imogen Bailey as Sarah
- James Coyne as Billy James
- Cheryl Craig as Michele
- Gary Waddell as Cajun Pilot
- Conan Stevens as Ted Sallis / Man-Thing

The characters portrayed by Mammone, Zappa, and director Leonard are named after Mike Ploog, Steve Gerber, and Val Mayerik, who all worked on the Man-Thing comic. A photo of Man-Thing co-creator Stan Lee can be seen on the board of "Missing People" who have been presumably killed by the Man-Thing.

== Production ==
=== Development ===
In 2000, Marvel Enterprises entered into a joint venture agreement with Artisan Entertainment to turn at least 15 Marvel superhero franchises into live-action films, television series, direct-to-video films, and internet projects. These franchises included an adaptation of the Man-Thing. Plans to make a film about the character were first announced in 2001. It was variously considered for a direct-to-video release, or a theatrical release. After the success of Stephen Norrington's Blade (1998), Bryan Singer's X-Men (2000) and Sam Raimi's Spider-Man (2002), the film was moved to a theatrical release to exploit on the success of superheroes.

Originally, director Brett Leonard and writers James Coyne and Hans Rodionoff were developing Man-Thing as a darker, emotional horror film with a strong character-driven origin story. Their version reportedly focused on Ted Sallis’ transformation into Man-Thing, a more tragic and emotional exploration of his human life, a father-son relationship element that gave the monster story a personal tragedy. However, after Hulk received mixed reviews and underperformed compared to expectations, Marvel executives became worried that Man-Thing shared too many similarities. Ang Lee’s Hulk was not considered a complete failure, but it was divisive. Critics praised aspects like its ambition, visual style, and psychological themes, but many audiences disliked.

According to Leonard, Marvel executives became concerned that Man-Thing’s emotional father-son storyline might create the same reaction. As a result, the studio sent a new script draft that drastically changed the direction of the movie, from the version he wanted to make.

=== Filming ===
Man-Thing was shot completely on location in Sydney, Australia; locations included Wisemans Ferry, Serenity Cove Studios at Kurnell for exterior swamp scenes and Homebush Bay. Although filming was originally intended to be done in New Orleans, budget realities forced production to be relocated to Australia. The film was the first to use the new Kurnell studios and enlisted regional actors for every role.

=== Post-production ===
On October 27, 2003, it was reported that Artisan Entertainment, which had partnered with Marvel Enterprises in the production of Man-Thing and The Punisher films, was being purchased by Lionsgate Films. In February 2004, the film production and distribution company Lionsgate merged with Artisan Entertainment and received the film rights to Iron Fist, the Black Widow, the Man-Thing and the Punisher. In January 2004, producer Avi Arad said that the Man-Thing was more of a departure from the original comic than were Marvel's other film characters in that it was a horror film with a menacing central character. In April 2004, the film had been completed, with the finished print received and waiting to be tested with audiences, after which an exact release date would be determined. The film was rated R for violence, grisly images, language, and some sexuality by the Motion Picture Association of America (MPAA).

Avi Arad, then CEO of Marvel Studios, admitted that it was a mistake not to keep tabs on the production, as it was being filmed so far away in Australia. He stated, "The one hiccup we had was the one project we didn't micromanage. We were not going to the Outback; there was so much going on. We will never do that again. We should never have trusted anybody that far away without our supervision. Thankfully, it was a small movie and not a disaster. If we were there and on top of it, it would have been an amazing movie. I look at the [horror] genre, and I think 'Shịt, I can't believe this'. We've learned our lesson."

=== Effects ===
Marvel Studios producer Avi Arad said "The lead character in the Man-Thing movie would be a combination of prosthetics and computer-generated effects." From the outset, Man-Thing was intended to be a prosthetic, CG-enhanced creature. Arad told The Continuum during a visit to Marvel Studios, "So there was a great deal of R&D.... There's positional stuff happening on location, on the set, but at the same time, the stuff you don't currently see in camera was always engineered to be enhanced by digital effects. So when you see the movie, hopefully the line is pretty blurry. It's not an all-CG creature."

=== Design ===
Special effects makeup was by the Make-Up Effects Group of Australia. The Man-Thing was built as a full-size creature suit, portrayed by Conan Stevens, a 7-foot-1-inch (216 cm) Australian actor, ex-wrestler and stuntman.

Although no full-digital Man-Thing model was made due to budgetary constraints, the suit was combined with digital moving branches and tendrils for certain sequences, as well as digital augmentation for the eyes. Brett Leonard quoted, "We had to constantly replace mud to get enough mud in certain areas. And we had to build up mounds of mud, because mostly it was a tank of water."

"This was like working in water, mud, and weird slime the whole time. It was basically, even though it was not a toxic real swamp, like the other part we were making, but this was the man-made swamp," the filmmaker adds. "It actually became a bit toxic because one day, for one of the scenes coming up, we had to create a bigger mound of mud, and the Australian crew went to grab some bags of like Fuller's earth to build the mud mound up.

Due to these budgetary constraints, most scenes featuring Man-Thing, including ones that would have provided a backstory for the monster, had to be removed, with some later reused in a tie-in comic miniseries. As a result, Man-Thing only appears in around seven minutes of the film.

== Music ==
The band AzUR (DOG Productions' Wayne and Luke, joined by Bec and Freddie) recorded the song "The Man-Thing Lives Again," which was played over the end credits of the film. It was supposed to be released as a promotional video, but since the film was in a constant state of flux (financial, script, etc. ...) and was not going to theatres (as intended), the music video was pulled for lack of budget. Marvel did not want to leak advance images of the set and creature costume before the film's eventual release. One of the band members has worked on the footage and uploaded a remix on YouTube.

=== Soundtrack ===
Man-Thing: Original Motion Picture Soundtrack

Soundtrack album by Roger Mason
- Released: March 17, 2009
- Genre: Film soundtrack
- Length: 66:28
- Label: Nice Spot

The Man-Thing album was composed by Roger Mason and was released on March 17, 2009. The soundtrack consists of 21 tracks. Its duration is over an hour. The album was released by Nice Spot.

No.	Title	Length
1.	"Opening/ Swamp"	2:30
2.	"Billy & Sarah"	2:23
3.	"Old Sheriff's Office"	3:10
4.	"People Are Dying"	1:36
5.	"Ploog/Something's Out There"	1:42
6.	"Asylum/Trouble At The Plant"	2:50
7.	"Corley Drops In/ Autopsy"	5:55
8.	"Gerber Is Nervous/ Meeting la Rogue"	2:18
9.	"Gerber's Body"	1:25
10.	"Descent Into Deep Swamp"	2:35
11.	"Sacred Land Man/ Dwayne Goes Down"	3:09
12.	"Kyle Paddles Upriver/ Snared By la Rogue"	7:35
13.	"Ploog's Photos/ Schoolyard"	2:27
14.	"Everyone Will Die"	6:14
15.	"Pulled Apart Like a Puppet"	2:16
16.	"Pete Prepares to Meet his Fate"	5:49
17.	"Kyle Might Be In Trouble"	1:22
18.	"Finding the Dark Water"	7:33
19.	"Spirits of the Dark Water"	0:53
20.	"Shist Shoots Kyle & Rene"	4:05
21.	"Man Thing Returns to the Swamp"	2:41

== Release ==
In October 2003, Man-Thing had been scheduled for release on August 27, 2004. The US release date was set for Halloween (October 31) 2004, but when Marvel Enterprises released its second quarter financial report, Man-Thing was included in the 2005 line-up with a release date to be decided. Reportedly, the film was so bad that the test audience walked out before it was finished. So, Marvel put it back on video in the United States, since it would not be bankable in a domestic release. The film was released internationally in places like Russia and the United Arab Emirates. Man-Thing was released on April 30, 2005, as a "Sci-Fi Original" on the Sci-Fi Channel.

The film premiered in Singapore on April 21, 2005.

== Home media ==
The film was released on DVD and VHS on June 14, 2005, in the United States.

It was released as a two-disc DVD in Region 2 format.

== Reception ==
=== Box office ===
While the film was released direct to television in North America, it played theatrically in three international markets where it accumulated $1,123,136 in box office grosses. On April 28, 2005, Man-Thing opened in Russia and four other Post-Soviet states: Armenia, Belarus, Kazakhstan, and Moldova. The film opened on October 26, 2005, in the United Arab Emirates. Finally, the film opened in Spain on March 3, 2006.

=== Critical response ===
Man-Thing received negative reviews from critics. Upon its release, Man-Thing holds a 14% approval rating on Rotten Tomatoes based on seven reviews.

Felix Vasquez from Cinema Crazed gave the film a negative review, writing, "While the special effects are really good, and the directing is decent, this just ends up becoming a really bad movie botching a really good concept". David Nusair from Reel Film Reviews awarded the film 1 out of 4 stars, calling it "the worst comic book movie ever made". Jon Condit from Dread Central gave the film a rating of 1.5 out of 5, writing, "Maybe in more capable hands than Brett Leonard's this could have been a creepy, albeit cheesy monster movie, but instead it just ends up falling flat." David Cornelius from eFilmCritic.com gave the film 2/5 stars, stating that the film was "too lame to be genuinely entertaining, not stupid enough throughout to be laughable". Adam Tyner from DVD Talk awarded the film 2/5 stars, calling it "thoroughly mediocre". Andrew Smith of Popcorn Pictures rated the film a 5/10, calling it "[a] Wasted effort but watchable anyway".

== In other media ==
To coincide with the film's release, Marvel published a three-issue tie-in comic miniseries titled Man-Thing (Vol. 4), written by Hans Rodionoff and illustrated by Kyle Hotz. The series served as a prequel to the film and incorporated some unused scenes and concepts originally written for the movie's screenplay.

The series centers around an insurance investigator who travels to the swamp to investigate a series of mysterious accidents believed to be caused by the mythical Man-Thing.

== Cancelled sequel ==
In May 2004, writer Hans Rodionoff stated that there had been some "very preliminary" discussions regarding a sequel and that he had already been exploring ideas, such as introducing Man-Thing-centric characters from the comics like Jennifer Kale and Howard the Duck. The project never materialized, largely due to the film's critical failure.

== Reboot ==
The character's film rights, along with the other Marvel characters whose film rights were previously acquired by Artisan Entertainment, have reverted to Marvel.

The Man-Thing appears in the 2022 Marvel Cinematic Universe special Werewolf by Night, motion-captured by Carey Jones and with Jeffrey Ford providing additional vocalizations.
