= Kathleen Rowe McAllen =

American actress (born 1960)

- Born: Kathleen Bridget Rowe; November 30, 1958 (age 67); San Mateo County, California, U.S.
- Occupation: Actress
- Years active: 1981–1997
- Known for: Stage and television roles

Kathleen Rowe McAllen (born Kathleen Bridget Rowe; November 30, 1958) is an American actress, best known for appearing in stage musicals and soap operas.

== Biography ==
Kathleen Bridget Rowe was born in San Mateo County, California. She attended UC Berkeley and UCLA as a pre-med major.

Turning to acting, she appeared in Broadway and Off-Broadway productions of The Human Comedy, Into the Woods, Joseph and the Amazing Technicolor Dreamcoat, A Little Night Music, Merrily We Roll Along, and On Your Toes. In 1990 she won a Theatre World Award for her performance as Giulietta Trapani in Aspects of Love. She was also nominated for the Tony Award for Best Featured Actress in a Musical the same year. In 1997 she played Dulcinea in Man of La Mancha and Mary Bailey in A Wonderful Life.

McAllen appeared on the television soap operas As the World Turns, Loving, and All My Children. She reprised the role of Giulietta Trapani in a 1993 television film adaptation of Aspects of Love. Her sole theatrical film credit is for the role of Gabrielle/Julie in the low-budget 1981 horror film Fear No Evil, about which she later said, "Every time I see it I absolutely cringe. I am the worst actress in the entire thing; I was 20 years old and terrified."

== Filmography ==
- Fear No Evil (film, 1981)
- As the World Turns (television, 1981–1982)
- Loving (television, 1985)
- All My Children, (television, 1988)
- Aspects of Love (TV movie, 1993)
