= First Independent Films =

British film distributor

- Type: Subsidiary
- Founded: 1981; 45 years ago (as Vestron Video International); 1990; 36 years ago (as First Independent Films)
- Defunct: 1998; 28 years ago
- Fate: Brand and catalogue sold to Columbia TriStar Home Video
- Headquarters: London, England
- Parent: Vestron, Inc. (1981–1990); HTV International (1990–1997); United News & Media (1997-1998)

First Independent Films was a British film distributor and home video company that replaced Vestron Video International's UK operations.

== History ==
Vestron Video formed its international division, Vestron Video International, in 1981, including a UK subsidiary.

During Vestron's restructuring and eventual bankruptcy in 1990, the company sold the UK division of Vestron Video International for £ 6.68 million to HTV International, the international sales division of HTV; ITV's then-franchise holder for Wales and the West of England. In January 1991, HTV rebranded and rechristened the company as First Independent Films, revealing a strategy of releasing twelve to fourteen theatrical movies a year, and thirty-six to forty titles on home video. First Independent allowed HTV International to expand into the in-house physical and theatrical markets, and Vestron UK's staff remained with the company.

Alongside in-house HTV productions, films and independent films, First Independent's biggest partner was Turner Entertainment Co., distributing much of their content during the 1990s, through their deal signed in 1991, which included the likes of films from Castle Rock Entertainment, Turner Pictures Worldwide Distribution and select New Line Cinema releases (alternating with their main UK partner Entertainment Film Distributors), World Championship Wrestling material, alongside a wide range of animated material from Hanna-Barbera Cartoons.

The company began to meet its demise after the mid-1990s. The company lost Turner as a major partner in 1997 after the company was bought out by Time Warner the previous year and Warner Bros. took over distribution for most of their assets. HTV itself would be purchased by United News & Media in June, and First Independent moved over as a separate division.

In February 1998, following the commercial failure of G.I. Jane, United News & Media announced they would exit the theatrical market and put First Independent up for sale. In June, the company announced that unless they found a buyer for First Independent, the company would shutter at the end of the year. UN&M had talks with Alliance Communications and Behaviour Worldwide for a possible sale, but those fell through. Eventually, Columbia TriStar Home Video's UK operations purchased the First Independent brand and remaining library shortly afterwards. For a couple of years, they continued to use the First Independent name as a secondary brand for its archived titles on VHS and DVD, although no new products were released under the name. The company itself was not included in the sale, and remained with United News & Media as a dormant business, relocating its headquarters to The London Studios until being folded on 20 December 2016.

== Film releases ==
Films distributed theatrically by First Independent Films include:

1991:

- Catchfire
- Eminent Domain
- Fear
- Misery
- Over Her Dead Body
- Sibling Rivalry
- Prayer of the Rollerboys
- Dolly Dearest
- Let Him Have It
- City Slickers
- Homicide
- Iron Maze

1992:

- Year of the Gun
- Late for Dinner
- Naked Lunch
- Ricochet
- Don't Tell Mom the Babysitter's Dead
- The Lawnmower Man
- Man Trouble
- House Party 2

1993:

- Deep Cover
- Night and the City
- Folks!
- Honeymoon in Vegas
- Leprechaun
- Mr. Saturday Night
- Wild West
- Bad Behaviour
- Frauds
- Tom and Jerry: The Movie
- Menace II Society
- Warlock: The Armageddon
- Raining Stones
- Naked
- Sins of Desire

1994:

- Bhaji on the Beach
- A Dangerous Woman
- 8 Seconds
- Sleep with Me
- Above the Rim

1995:

- Nostradamus
- Little Odessa
- Dumb and Dumber
- Bulletproof Heart
- Mortal Kombat
- The Basketball Diaries

1996:

- Lawnmower Man 2: Beyond Cyberspace
- White Squall
- Now and Then
- Rainbow
- Original Gangstas
- Boston Kickout
- Crimetime
- The Last of the High Kings
- Box of Moonlight

1997:

- Normal Life
- Broken English
- Eddie
- Killer: A Journal of Murder
- Trigger Happy
- Night Falls on Manhattan
- House of America
- G.I. Jane
- Keep the Aspidistra Flying
- This World, Then the Fireworks

1998

- Cube
- Traveller
- Hurricane Streets
- Wishmaster
- Savior

1999:

- Orgazmo
- Just the Ticket
- A Walk on the Moon
