= Cyberwar (video game) =

1994 video game

- European box art
- Developer: Sales Curve Interactive
- Publisher: Interplay Productions
- Platforms: MS-DOS, Mac, PlayStation
- Release: November 1994
- Genres: Action, puzzle
- Mode: Single-player

Cyberwar is game based on the film The Lawnmower Man and a direct sequel to the video game adaptation of the film, which itself takes place after the film. It was released for MS-DOS and Mac in 1994 by Interplay Productions. Ports were announced for the Sega CD, 3DO, and in Japan for the Saturn and PlayStation, but only the PlayStation version was released.

== Gameplay ==
The player assumes the role of Dr. Angelo, sent in to virtual reality to defeat Jobe, who was born with an intellectual disability but increased his brain capacity by 400% using virtual reality, then eventually left his physical body and entered VR permanently. The various gameplay elements are based on the virtual reality segments seen in the original film. For instance, one of the levels has the player flying through tunnels while avoiding multiple objects, much like one of the games in the film.

If the player misses any part of any challenge, they reach a game over. Cyberwar consists of three discs but also includes a CD with the soundtrack featured in the game.

== Reception ==
A reviewer for Next Generation gave the PC version two out of five stars, calling it "little more than a rehash of SCI's original title The Lawnmower Man with slightly changed action sequences and the 256-color graphics supposed to be included the first time."

On release, Famicom Tsūshin scored the PlayStation version of the game an 18 out of 40. Reviewing it as an import, Next Generation gave it two out of five stars, razing it for its extremely limited interactivity.
