= Austin O'Brien =

American actor (born 1981)

- Born: Austin Taylor O'Brien; May 11, 1981 (age 44); Eugene, Oregon, U.S.
- Occupations: Actor, photographer

Austin Taylor O'Brien (born May 11, 1981) is an American actor and photographer. He is known for playing the co-lead Danny Madigan in the Arnold Schwarzenegger film Last Action Hero, followed by his turn into romance as Nick Zsigmond in My Girl 2, a part in both The Lawnmower Man and its sequel, Logan Bruno in The Baby-Sitters Club and as Josh Greene in the CBS drama Promised Land. O'Brien originally gained fame from a Circuit City commercial as a kid who, after finding out he had saved some money by shopping at Circuit City, simply says, "Cool," to a store employee.

O'Brien was born in Eugene, Oregon.

== Filmography ==
Roles in film and television
Year	Title	Role	Notes
1992	The Lawnmower Man	Peter Parkette	
1993	Last Action Hero	Danny Madigan	
1993	Prehysteria!	Jerry	
1994	My Girl 2	Nick Zsigmond	
1995	Apollo 13	Whiz Kid	Although credited, O'Brien does not actually appear in the film
1995	The Baby-Sitters Club	Logan Bruno	
1996	Lawnmower Man 2: Beyond Cyberspace	Peter Parkette	
1998	Only Once	Greg	
2004	Runaways	Steve	
2007	A Christmas Too Many	Jack	Direct-to-video
2009	Helix	Jae	
2009	Bounty	Jake	
2009	This Is the Place	Simon	
2010	Rain from Stars	Young Edward	
2011	Defining Moments	Allan	
2011	Nowhere Road	Producer	
2015	All Our Yesterdays	(unnamed)	

== Television ==
Year	Title	Role	Notes
1995	ER	Kyle Kazlaw	Episode: "The Secret Sharer"
1996	Home of the Brave	Joshua 'Josh' Greene	Television film
1996–1998	Touched by an Angel	Joshua 'Josh' Greene	4 episodes
1996–1999	Promised Land	Joshua 'Josh' Greene	67 episodes
2001	Spirit	Cole	Television film
2008	Bones	Jimmy Grant	Episode: "The Baby in the Bough"
