= T-Rex: Back to the Cretaceous =

1998 film by Brett Leonard

- Release poster
- Directed by: Brett Leonard
- Written by: Andrew Gellis; Jeanne Rosenberg; David Young
- Produced by: Antoine Compin; Charis Horton
- Starring: Liz Stauber; Peter Horton; Kari Coleman
- Cinematography: Andrew Kitzanuk
- Edited by: Jonathan P. Shaw
- Music by: William Ross
- Distributed by: IMAX
- Release date: October 23, 1998
- Running time: 45 minutes
- Country: United States
- Language: English
- Budget: $14.5 million
- Box office: $104 million

T-Rex: Back to the Cretaceous is a 1998 American educational adventure film shot for the IMAX 3D format. The film is directed by Brett Leonard. Executive producer/co-writer Andrew Gellis and producers Antoine Compin and Charis Horton also make up the production team. Liz Stauber and Peter Horton star, alongside Kari Coleman, Tuck Milligan, and Laurie Murdoch. When a museum accident transports teenager Ally Hayden on an adventure back in time, she explores the terrain and territory of life-sized dinosaurs, even during a nose-to-nose encounter with a female Tyrannosaurus. The film is among the few IMAX films that are considered "pure entertainment", though it still is considered rather educational by the mainstream audience.

== Plot ==
16-year-old Ally Hayden is the daughter of Dr. Donald Hayden, a world-famous paleontologist and museum curator. She loves dinosaurs and longs to be able to accompany him to one of the nearby paleontological digs, but her father thinks this is too dangerous and she has to settle for giving museum tours instead.

A mysterious accident at the lab revolving an oblong fossil egg (which her father Dr. Hayden and her sister Jesse discovered at a dig site) happens while Ally's father and sister Jesse are away at a dig site with Donald's assistant, and Ally is magically transported back in time. Among the various time periods she visits are the Late Cretaceous, when the Tyrannosaurus rex and Pteranodon existed. Ally is also transported to the early 20th century where she meets renowned historical figures in the world of paleontology. These include dinosaur painter Charles Knight and Barnum Brown, arguably one of the most famous paleontologists in early fossil-hunting history.

During her adventure, Ally accidentally loses her locket. Further exploration during the Cretaceous period leads Ally to discover a Tyrannosaurus rex nest filled with eggs. She defends the nest from a Struthiomimus, earning the mother T. Rex's respect to the point where she allows Ally to touch her. The meteor that marked the end of the dinosaur's reign then impacts Earth, blasting Ally back into the present day. There, she is reunited with her father. As they leave the museum, the fossil egg which began the whole adventure begins to shake. Then, with only the museum kitten watching, it shows itself to be a living dinosaur egg and breaks apart, revealing a still living baby Tyrannosaurus.

== Cast ==
- Liz Stauber as Ally Hayden
- Peter Horton as Dr. Donald Hayden
- Kari Coleman as Elizabeth Sample
- Charlene Sashuk as Jesse Hayden (Ally's older sister)
- Dan Libman as The Guard
- Tuck Milligan as Charles Knight
- Laurie Murdoch as Barnum Brown
- Joshua Silberg and Alex Hudson as Young boys
- Chris Enright as Dig assistant No. 2

== Dinosaurs and other animals ==
- Tyrannosaurus (both living—mother and a hatchling—and a skeleton)
- Struthiomimus (both living and a skeleton)
- Pteranodon (both living and a skeleton)
- Parasaurolophus (both living and a skeleton)
- Dryptosaurus (both living and a painting)
- Albertosaurus (skeleton)
- Allosaurus (skeleton)
- Brontosaurus (skeleton)
- Camarasaurus (skeleton)
- Centrosaurus/Monoclonius (skeleton)
- Chasmosaurus (skeleton)
- Daspletosaurus (skeleton)
- Dimetrodon (skeleton)
- Edmontosaurus (skeleton)
- Euoplocephalus (skeleton)
- Hypacrosaurus (skeleton)
- Megacerops (museum banner)
- Lambeosaurus (skeleton)
- Oviraptor (skeleton)
- Smilodon (skeleton)
- Stegosaurus (skeleton)
- Triceratops (skeleton)
- Woolly mammoth (both skeleton and a painting)

== Production ==
Principal photography began on September 22, 1997, on location at Dinosaur Provincial Park in the Badlands region of Alberta, Canada, and near the town of Brooks. Filming began by capturing the scenes in which Ally Hayden time-travels back to the turn of the century to go on expedition with famous bone-hunter Barnum Brown.

Filming continued for two weeks on location in Dinosaur Provincial Park. Yet the filmmakers faced a challenge in finding a realistic environment to set the live-action filming portion for the Cretaceous period sequences when Ally finds herself wandering amidst the lush vegetation of 66 million years ago. The location used to film Cretaceous period scenes in the end was in the Olympia rain forest in upper Washington state.

The special considerations that must be made when working with IMAX 3D presentation also made it crucial that the background features of the shooting locations were ideal.

Besides shooting locations, extensive computer-generated imagery was also employed to ensure the realism of the dinosaurs depicted in the film. Models had to be sculpted and digitized, with details such as texturing crucial to the process. The filmmakers of the next year's television documentary series Walking with Dinosaurs also faced similar challenges.

== Reception ==
The film received positive notices from critics. On review aggregator website Rotten Tomatoes, the film has a 71% rating from 21 critics.

== See also ==
- List of films featuring dinosaurs
