= Hideaway (1995 film) =

- Theatrical release poster
- Directed by: Brett Leonard
- Screenplay by: Andrew Kevin Walker; Neal Jimenez
- Based on: Hideaway by Dean Koontz
- Produced by: Jerry A. Baerwitz; Gimel Everett; Agatha Hanczakowski
- Starring: Jeff Goldblum; Christine Lahti; Alfred Molina; Jeremy Sisto; Alicia Silverstone
- Cinematography: Gale Tattersall
- Edited by: B.J. Sears
- Music by: Trevor Jones
- Production company: TriStar Pictures
- Distributed by: Sony Pictures Releasing
- Release date: March 3, 1995
- Running time: 106 minutes
- Countries: United States; Canada
- Language: English
- Box office: $26 million

Hideaway is a 1995 horror film directed by Brett Leonard. It is based on the 1992 novel of the same name by Dean Koontz, and stars Jeff Goldblum, Christine Lahti, Alicia Silverstone, Jeremy Sisto, Alfred Molina and Rae Dawn Chong.

In the film, Goldblum plays a man who survives a near death experience due to a traffic accident and afterwards finds himself psychically connected to a serial killer.

Hideaway was released by Sony Pictures Releasing on March 3, 1995. Critical reception was largely negative, and the film was not a financial success, grossing $26 million.

== Plot ==
After killing his mother and sister and ritualistically arranging their bodies as a sacrifice to Satan, a Devil worshiper recites the Lords Prayer backwards as it is written on the wall in a room filled with candles and Satanic imagery. He then commits suicide by throwing himself onto an athame in an attempt to ensure that he is eternally damned. What follows next is a near-death experience where the clinically dead killer flies through tunnels of light, eventually arriving at a gaping, tentacle-like being of light who, after flashing through scenes of the recent brutal murders, darkens and casts the killer's soul down into Hell.

Meanwhile, antiques dealer Hatch Harrison is driving home from his family's lakeside cabin with his wife Lindsey and daughter Regina. They collide with a truck and, after Regina manages to escape, the car plummets down a ravine into a fast-flowing river. Hatch is believed dead.

At the hospital, Hatch is revived by Dr. Jonas Nyebern, who runs a specialist resuscitation team. During the procedure, a nurse warns Dr. Nyebern about bringing back a patient who has been gone for so long, saying "We both remember what happened last time." While he is on the operating table, Hatch experiences visions of the same tunnels of light as the killer, but upon arriving for judgment is slowly floated into a surreal heavenly scene, where he sees his young daughter Samantha who died years earlier. Hatch then enters Heaven and is merged into the light of a great angel until he is revived.

Hatch begins to experience disturbing visions while he sleeps which involve him seemingly murdering young women, when in fact he is actually seeing through the eyes of the real killer. As the killer looks down at his young blonde victim dead in shrubs at the side of a road, Hatch sees the same vision; in his vision the young blonde woman becomes his daughter Regina. The killer, who can also see through the eyes of Hatch, sees Regina.

Hatch realizes that the murders are actually happening when the women he sees in his visions are announced as missing in news reports. Regina sneaks out of the house to meet some friends and they go to a dingy alternative night club, where the killer also happens to be. He recognizes Regina from his vision and introduces himself as "Vassago". Regina's friends interrupt and tell Vassago to leave them alone. Hatch, asleep at home, sees all this happening in his visions.

The next day, Hatch accuses Regina of being at the night club, which she denies. Hatch scares Regina as he attempts to warn her about Vassago. He is told that he is experiencing mental problems by his family, his psychiatrist, and the police. He visits a psychic who confirms his beliefs and tells him that he is tied to Vassago by a "coincidence of fate", and that Vassago is also seeing through Hatch's eyes. Vassago sees this and then visits the psychic at her home and kills her.

Hatch discovers that Vassago's real name is Jeremy Nyebern, and is the son of Dr. Nyebern. He confronts Dr. Nyebern, who explains that Jeremy is psychotic and that after murdering his mother and sister and attempting suicide, was revived by his resuscitation team. Jeremy kidnaps Regina and takes her to his hideaway beneath an abandoned amusement park where he has been building a "monument to hell". He ties Regina up at the top.

Dr. Nyebern finds Jeremy and tries to talk him down, but Jeremy kills him. Hatch and Lindsey find them, and a fight ensues between Hatch and Jeremy. The demonic soul within Jeremy emerges and calls itself Vassago while Hatch watches. An angelic spirit resembling Hatch's daughter Samantha then emerges from him and collides with Vassago in a battle of good vs evil. Hatch manages to kill an attacking Jeremy while the spirit kills Vassago. With his family safe, he exits the park with them.

A post-credits scene shows Jeremy being pulled in to be revived. Jeremy wakes up, reaches for a scalpel on the medical table, and slits a nurse's throat. Hatch wakes up in his bed, realizing he was only dreaming. Hatch and Lindsey laugh and go back to sleep.

== Cast ==
- Jeff Goldblum as Hatch Harrison / Uriel
- Christine Lahti as Lindsey Harrison
- Alicia Silverstone as Regina Harrison
- Jeremy Sisto as Vassago / Jeremy Nyebern
- Alfred Molina as Dr. Jonas Nyebern
- Rae Dawn Chong as Rose Orwetto
- Kenneth Welsh as Detective Breech

== Production ==
The film was an international co-production film between The United States and Canada. Filming took place in 1994 in Britannia Beach, British Columbia, Canada. Vassago's hideaway was constructed in the abandoned Britannia Mine.

== Soundtrack ==
Hideaway: Original Motion Picture Soundtrack

Soundtrack album by Various artists
- Released: 1995
- Genre: Industrial metal

Various chronology
| Hideaway: Original Motion Picture Soundtrack (1995) |

Professional ratings
Review scores
| Source | Rating |

=== Track listing ===
| No. | Title | Artist | Length |
|---|---|---|---|
| 1. | "Go to Hell" (Naïve) | KMFDM | 5:45 |
| 2. | "She Believes in Me" (She Believes in Me) | Oedipussy | 5:29 |
| 3. | "Peep Show" (Fairytales of Slavery) | Miranda Sex Garden | 3:53 |
| 4. | "All Good Girls" (Engine) | Die Warzau | 5:00 |
| 5. | "Lung (Bronchitis Mix)" (Wired/Lung) | Sister Machine Gun | 3:08 |
| 6. | "Scumgrief (Deep Dub Trauma Mix)" (Fear Is the Mindkiller) | Fear Factory | 6:18 |
| 7. | "Surface Patterns" (Millennium) | Front Line Assembly | 5:36 |
| 8. | "Reverberation Nation" (Untitled Peace, Love & Pitbulls album) | Peace, Love & Pitbulls | 5:36 |
| 9. | "Nihil" (Cold World) | Godflesh | 5:56 |
| 10. | "Cut" (Fairytales of Slavery) | Miranda Sex Garden | 4:50 |
| 11. | "Main Titles "Nunc Dimitus"" (Hideaway) | Trevor Jones | 3:48 |
| 12. | "Into The Light" (Hideaway) | Trevor Jones | 6:57 |
| 13. | "Beyond The Shadow Of Death" (Hideaway) | Trevor Jones | 10:26 |

== Reception ==
The film received mostly negative reviews from critics, with Rotten Tomatoes reporting that 12 out of the 15 reviews they tallied were negative for a score of 20% and a certification of "rotten".

Mick LaSalle of the San Francisco Chronicle gave the film a poor review, but stated Goldblum's performance "makes a tedious film intermittently tolerable."

Film critic/historian Leonard Maltin characterized the movie as a "bomb" and added, "This goes nowhere for nearly two interminable hours."

Roger Ebert of The Chicago Sun-Times gave the film a rare positive review, 3 stars out of a possible 4. He characterized it as a standard fare horror film that accomplishes its modest goals via good performances by a talented cast. He wrote: "Look, I'm not saying this is a great movie, or even a distinguished one. I'm saying: You want horror, you want psychic abandon, you want Rae Dawn Chong reading Jeff Goldblum's Tarot cards and not liking what she sees, you see this movie, you get your money's worth."

Koontz was reportedly dissatisfied with the film. According to Rita Kempley of The Washington Post, "Koontz hates the movie so much he tried to force TriStar to remove his name from the credits." In addition, according to the San Francisco Chronicle's Walter Addiego, Koontz was so dissatisfied with Hideaway that he would only allow a film adaptation of his novel Phantoms to be made if he was allowed to approve the final version of the film.

On his own website, Koontz states that pre-production of the film was promising under Mike Medavoy, who wanted to preserve Koontz's vision for the story and ordered a rewrite of the first script at Koontz's request. However, Medavoy was removed from the film and new production staff did not communicate with Koontz about the finished film, which departed drastically from his novel. Koontz ultimately resorted to legal means to get his name removed from the title of the film and from major advertising, but was unsuccessful. He also writes that he sent several letters to the Japanese CEO of the parent company of Universal/MCA, which had the rights to the film, requesting that his name be removed.

=== Box office ===
Hideaway made $12,201,255 at the US and Canadian box office and $14 million internationally for a worldwide gross of $26.2 million.

=== Home media ===
Hideaway was released on VHS on August 29, 1995, by Columbia TriStar Home Video.
