= The Lawnmower Man (film) =

1992 film by Brett Leonard

- Theatrical release poster
- Directed by: Brett Leonard
- Screenplay by: Brett Leonard; Gimel Everett
- Based on: "The Lawnmower Man" (1975 short story) by Stephen King (Note: King successfully sued for the story to no longer be credited or marketed as the film's source material due to the lack of similarities between the two.)
- Produced by: Gimel Everett
- Starring: Jeff Fahey; Pierce Brosnan; Jenny Wright; Geoffrey Lewis; Austin O'Brien
- Cinematography: Russell Carpenter
- Edited by: Alan Baumgarten; Lisa Bromwell (director's cut)
- Music by: Dan Wyman
- Production companies: Allied Vision; Lane Pringle Productions; Fuji Eight Co., Ltd.
- Distributed by: New Line Cinema (U.S.); First Independent Films (U.K.); Shochiku Fuji (Japan)
- Release dates: March 6, 1992 (U.S.); June 5, 1992 (U.K.)
- Running time: 108 minutes (theatrical cut); 142 minutes (director's cut)
- Countries: United States; United Kingdom; Japan
- Language: English
- Budget: $10 million
- Box office: $32.5 million

The Lawnmower Man is a 1992 science fiction horror film directed by Brett Leonard, written by Leonard and Gimel Everett, and starring Jeff Fahey as Jobe Smith, an intellectually disabled gardener, and Pierce Brosnan as Dr. Lawrence "Larry" Angelo, a scientist who decides to experiment on him in an effort to give him greater intelligence by stimulating his brain using nootropic drugs and virtual reality computer simulations. The experiments give Jobe superhuman abilities, but also increase his aggression, turning him into a man obsessed with evolving into a digital being. The film is an international co-production between the United Kingdom and Japan.

The film was originally marketed as the adaptation of a 1975 short story by Stephen King, which featured a Pan-worshipping satyr using his mystical powers to operate a landscaping business and mow lawns. Allied Vision began developing the film after a planned adaptation of King's book Night Shift (1978), an anthology the story was published in. However, it struggled to expand King's original story into a feature film and instead rewrote an unrelated screenplay entitled CyberGod into an adaptation. The final film bears little resemblance to the original story beyond a single sequence of the antagonist telekinetically using a lawnmower to murder a character named "Harold Parkette" and the inclusion of the antagonist group The Shop from other King stories. Because of the deviation from his story, King successfully sued to have his name removed from the film, which was originally titled Stephen King's The Lawnmower Man. King won further damages when his name was included in the title of the home video release.

A sequel, Lawnmower Man 2: Beyond Cyberspace, was released in 1996, with Austin O'Brien as the only returning actor from the original film.

== Plot ==
Dr. Lawrence Angelo, a scientist at Virtual Space Industries (VSI), conducts experiments using psychoactive drugs and virtual reality to enhance cognitive performance in a program called "Project 5". Although Angelo's intentions are benevolent, VSI is funded by "The Shop", a clandestine organization seeking military applications for his research. One of his test subjects, a chimpanzee named Rosco, gains enhanced intelligence, warfare training, and increased aggression; he eventually escapes but is killed by the laboratory's security forces. In response, Angelo decides to recruit Jobe Smith, an intellectually disabled gardener, as a new test subject, promising him increased intelligence. Angelo redesigns the treatments to eliminate the "aggression factors" used in the chimpanzee experiments. Not only does Jobe's intelligence improve, but he also develops psychokinesis and telepathy. He continues his training at the lab until an accident forces Angelo to halt the experiment.

Sebastian Timms, the project director, monitors the progress and secretly replaces Angelo's new medications with the original Project 5 formula. When Jobe invites his new lover Marnie to the lab for cybersex, he accidentally lobotomizes her. Undeterred, Jobe continues the treatments on his own and begins killing those who mistreated him in the past, as well as Harold Parkette, the abusive father of his 10-year-old friend, Peter. Angelo discovers the drug switch and confronts Jobe, who captures him and reveals his plan to achieve the ultimate stage of evolution by transforming into a being of "pure energy" within the VSI computer mainframe, intending to connect to all the world's computer systems. Jobe vows that his "birth" will be signaled by every phone on Earth ringing simultaneously.

The Shop sends a team to capture Jobe, but he uses his newfound abilities to destroy them. Jobe then enters the VSI mainframe, abandoning his physical body and becoming a digital being. Angelo remotely accesses the VSI computer, encrypting its connections to the outside world, thereby trapping Jobe in the mainframe. As Jobe frantically searches for an unencrypted network, Angelo sets bombs to destroy the building. Feeling responsible for Jobe's fate, Angelo enters virtual reality, attempting to reason with him one last time, even if it means dying together. Jobe overpowers Angelo, crucifying his digital form. When Peter enters the building, Jobe realizes the boy is in danger from the bombs. Out of lingering care for Peter, Jobe allows Angelo to escape the mainframe to save the child. Jobe himself escapes through a maintenance line just before the building explodes.

Later, Angelo is at home with Peter and his mother, Carla, when the telephone rings. Soon, another phone rings, followed by phones ringing worldwide.

== Cast ==
- Pierce Brosnan as Dr. Lawrence Angelo
- Jeff Fahey as Jobe Smith
- Jenny Wright as Marnie Burke
- Geoffrey Lewis as Terry McKeen
- Jeremy Slate as Father Francis McKeen
- Dean Norris as The Director
- Austin O'Brien as Peter Parkette
- Troy Evans as Lieutenant Goodwin
- Rosalee Mayeux as Carla Parkette
- Mark Bringelson as Sebastian Timms
- Ray Lykins as Harold Parkette
- John Laughlin as Jake Simpson
- Colleen Coffey as Caroline Angelo
- Michael Gregory as Security Director
- Jim Landis as Ed Walts
- Dale Raoul as Dolly
- Frank Collison as Night Gate Guard
- Doug Hutchison as Security Tech

== Production ==
=== Development ===
The plot of Stephen King's 1975 short story "The Lawnmower Man" concerns Harold Parkette, who hires "Pastoral Greenery and Outdoor Services Inc." to cut his lawn. Parkette later spies on the serviceman, discovering his lawnmower mows the lawn by itself while he crawls after it, naked, eating the grass. The serviceman is actually a satyr who worships the Greek god Pan. When Parkette tries to call the police, the mower and its owner ritually kill him as a sacrifice to Pan.

An earlier short film, also titled The Lawnmower Man, was directed by Jim Gonis in 1987. That film was a direct adaptation of the short story by King.

Milton Subotsky and Andrew Donally first acquired the film rights to Night Shift (1978), the anthology the story appeared in, in 1978. Edward and Valerie Abraham wrote a screenplay for an anthology film adapting "The Lawnmower Man", "The Mangler", and "Trucks" revolving around the theme of humanity's relationship with technology. Dino De Laurentiis purchased the rights to the screenplay in 1984 with the intention of making a series of King anthology films beginning with Cat's Eye (1985). However, it was later decided that the stories should be made into individual films, beginning with the adaptation of "Trucks" as Maximum Overdrive (1986). Allied Vision acquired the rights to adapt "The Lawnmower Man" but struggled to adapt the story into a feature-length film.

Meanwhile, director Brett Leonard and producer Gimel Everett wrote an original screenplay about virtual reality technology titled Cyber God. They were inspired by seeing Jaron Lanier and his VPL Research technology at a San Francisco event called "Cyberthon"; Brosnan later suggested using some of Lanier's lines in the film, and both VPL's DataSuit and EyePhone appear in the film as props. Allied Vision decided to combine the two projects, and between May and August 1990 they rewrote their script into The Lawnmower Man.

=== Writing ===
The new screenplay carried minor elements of King's original story, including the scene where Jobe kills Peter's father with the lawnmower "Big Red", and the aftermath in which the police state that they found some of his remains in the birdbath. The addition of a government agency known as "The Shop" was drawn from separate works of King's, such as Firestarter (1980) and The Tommyknockers (1987).

=== Filming and visual effects ===
Principal photography on the film began on May 28, 1991, in Los Angeles with a $10 million budget. The computer-generated imagery (CGI) was created for the film by Angel Studios. The scene where the priest is set on fire is an early use of motion capture, and was done by an Italian company who used the technology as a tool for golf training. A technique called the Gemini process was used to transfer CGI onto film by putting the digital images on a high-resolution cathode-ray tube (CRT) screen, frame by frame, which were then shot with a motion picture camera. The supervising sound editor was Frank Serafine, who was hired as a result of his sound creation work in the 1982 film Tron. Fuji Eight's Masao Takiyama is also credited as a co-producer.

== Release ==
The film was tested in Jacksonville, Florida, Fresno, California, and Providence, Rhode Island on February 14, 1992, and released in the United States on March 6, in 1,276 theatres.

The film was released in Japan under the title Virtual Wars.

=== Home media ===
New Line Home Video simultaneously released the 108-minute theatrical version of the film and an unrated 142-minute director's cut on VHS and LaserDisc on August 26, 1992. The success of the unrated version alerted King to New Line's continued defiance of the order that his name be stricken from the film's credits and all marketing, as the back covers still stated "Based on a Story by Stephen King". A third court order was needed to force the studio's compliance. As before, the court upheld the two prior judgments, but it took the extra step of imposing a penalty of $10,000 directly payable to King for every day New Line remained in contempt by defying the order. Additionally, the studio would have to forfeit all profits earned on the film during that same period.

The film was released on VCD in 1996. The DVD, released in December 1997, contains only the theatrical cut, with scenes from the unrated edition included as deleted scenes.

In February 1997, the director's cut was released in widescreen for the first time on double LaserDisc, featuring various special features on the C-side. The transfer used for the LaserDisc left King's name in the opening credits, but removed it from the title screen.

The director's cut was released on DVD with the inclusion of the sequel Lawnmower Man 2 on October 25, 2010, in the United Kingdom. However, it is a direct port of the earlier open matte NTSC LaserDisc release converted to PAL.

Prior to the US Shout! Factory release, Blu-ray versions of the film were only available in Italy through Minerva Pictures and in Germany under the Alive brand. The Italian release contains edited Italian credits at the beginning. These are clearly taken from the DVD version, creating a visible difference in quality from the rest of the movie (notably interlaced framing).

Shout! Factory released The Lawnmower Man on Blu-ray for the first time in the United States in June 2017. The two-disc set includes new 4k digital restorations of the theatrical and director's cuts, audio commentary with director Brett Leonard and producer Gimel Everett, an all-new retrospective documentary featuring Leonard and star Jeff Fahey, and all of the bonus features from the original New Line DVD. For unknown reasons, a line of dialogue from the theatrical release related to the killing of a chimp (which makes no sense in the context of the plot of the director's cut – in that version, the chimp escaped from the VSI lab) was re-introduced to the director's cut.

In Australia, the only version of the film to be released was the theatrical cut; the director's cut was only available as a UK import. It was not released on DVD until 2008, when Force Entertainment released a budget DVD, containing the theatrical cut and the special features from the US DVD, on its own or as a two-pack with its sequel.

== Reception ==
=== Box office ===
The movie debuted at number two at the box office with $7.7 million in its opening weekend behind Wayne's World. It went on to gross $32.1 million in the United States and Canada, making it the highest-grossing independent film for the calendar year and the second biggest released in 1992 after Miramax's The Crying Game. It did better internationally and grossed £3,622,720 ($6 million) in the United Kingdom and $112 million in other markets for a worldwide total of $150 million. It was the highest-grossing UK production in the United Kingdom for the calendar year.

=== Critical reception ===
On Rotten Tomatoes the film has a 35% rating based on 43 reviews, with an average rating of 4.8/10. The site's consensus states: "The Lawnmower Man suffers from a predictable, melodramatic script, and its once-groundbreaking visual effects look dated today". On Metacritic the film has a rating of 42 out of 100 based on 17 reviews, indicating "mixed or average" reviews.

Kim Newman of Empire magazine rated it 3 out of 5, saying "Although patched together from loose ends, this works surprisingly well, with interesting and well-integrated visual effects, some nice humour and a few genuinely visionary touches." Variety were critical of the "mundane" story, but praised the animation and visual effects: "The computer animation doesn’t necessarily break new ground, but it marks the first time it has been so well integrated into a live-action story."

== Director's cut ==
The original theatrical release had a large element cut from it involving Rosco the chimpanzee. In the film's opening Rosco escapes the lab and is helped by Jobe, who then witnesses him getting shot dead. This then led to several other cuts throughout the film to remove callbacks to this plot element. Another major difference includes moments with Lawrence's wife. In the theatrical cut she just disappears, but in the director's cut, Jobe controls her later on, and still later she is killed by the agents. Along with those major additions, there are also several scenes with extra dialogue.

The director's cut was initially released on VHS and LaserDisc by New Line Cinema. The 1997 DVD, however, only included the theatrical cut with most of the director's cut scenes included as deleted scenes. In 2017, Shout! Factory released both cuts on Blu-ray, both taken from 4K scans of the original elements.

== Stephen King lawsuit ==
The film, originally titled Stephen King's The Lawnmower Man, differed so much from the source material that King sued the filmmakers in May 1992 to remove his name from the title. King stated in court documents that the film "bore no meaningful resemblance" to his story.

A federal judge ruled in King's favor in July 1992, the first successful such ruling since James Oliver Curwood had his name removed from 1922's I Am the Law. On appeal, it was ruled in October that the on-screen credit could remain but that King's name should be removed from advertising. King received $2.5 million in settlement.

Despite the ruling, New Line still did not comply and initially released the home video version as Stephen King's The Lawnmower Man. In 1994, New Line was held in contempt of court.

== Subsequent media ==
=== Sequel ===
A sequel, Lawnmower Man 2: Beyond Cyberspace, was released in 1996 with Austin O'Brien as the only returning actor from the original film. It was retitled Lawnmower Man 2: Jobe's War for its video release. The film received negative reviews.

Comic book writer Grant Morrison said in an interview that they were contacted by the owners of the Lawnmower Man in 1995 and asked to write treatments for Lawnmower Man 2 and Lawnmower Man 3. Morrison claims they were asked to "bend the Lawnmower Man series in an X-Men superhero-type direction". Neither of Morrison's script treatments was used and Lawnmower Man 2: Beyond Cyberspace was produced without their involvement.

=== Video games ===
The film spawned two video games: The Lawnmower Man in 1993, and Cyberwar in 1994.

=== Cancelled graphic novel ===
A graphic novel adaptation of the film was announced by Innovation Comics for April 1992 release, but was never published.

=== Cancelled remake ===
Jaunt VR, a virtual reality studio, attempted to adapt the feature into a virtual reality experience with the original rights holders but ultimately went out of business before realizing its efforts.

== In other media ==
Some of the CGI footage of The Lawnmower Man was featured in the 1992 CG art film Beyond the Mind's Eye.

== See also ==
- Flowers for Algernon, a short story which also deals with a mentally disabled man whose intelligence is technologically boosted to genius levels
