= Gimel Everett =

American film producer

Gimel Sandra Everett
- Born: February 7, 1951
- Died: May 22, 2011 (aged 60)
- Occupations: Producer, Writer

Gimel Everett (/dʒɪˈmiːl/; February 7, 1951 — May 22, 2011) was an American producer specializing in the science-fiction and horror genres. Her most notable films were The Lawnmower Man and Virtuosity.

Everett co-wrote the screenplay for The Lawnmower Man with her husband, director Brett Leonard. It was noted for its quality special effects, becoming the number one commercially successful independent film of 1992, budgeted at $10 million and earning $30 million in its first two months of release and $13.6 in rentals.

Virtuosity became the first major film to feature nanotechnology set in a cyberpunk based future.

== Works ==
=== Film ===
- The Dead Pit 1989 (Writer, Producer, Editor)
- The Lawnmower Man 1992 (Writer, Producer, 2nd Unit Director)
- Hideaway 1995 (Producer)
- Virtuosity 1995 (Co-producer)
- Man-Thing (DVD box title) 2005 (as Producer)
