= Fear No Evil (1981 film) =

- Directed by: Frank LaLoggia
- Written by: Frank LaLoggia
- Produced by: Charles M. LaLoggia; Frank LaLoggia; Donald P. Borchers
- Starring: Stefan Arngrim; Elizabeth Hoffman; Kathleen Rowe McAllen
- Cinematography: Fred Goodich
- Edited by: Edna Ruth Paul
- Music by: Frank LaLoggia; David Spear
- Production company: LaLoggia Productions
- Distributed by: Avco Embassy Pictures
- Release date: January 16, 1981
- Running time: 99 minutes
- Country: United States
- Language: English
- Budget: $1.5 million
- Box office: $3 million

Fear No Evil is a 1981 American supernatural horror film directed by Frank LaLoggia in his feature directorial debut, and starring Stefan Arngrim, Elizabeth Hoffman, and Kathleen Rowe McAllen. Its plot involves a seventeen-year-old student in 1980 realizing that he is the Antichrist, and his subsequent battle with two female-incarnate archangels.

Fear No Evil was the directorial debut of LaLoggia, who personally raised $150,000 of the film's budget. Principal photography took place on location in and around LaLoggia's hometown of Rochester, New York in the late summer and fall of 1979.

The film was acquired for distribution by Avco Embassy Pictures, who also partially funded its post-production. The film was released theatrically on January 16, 1981. It received mixed reviews from critics, and grossed $3 million at the United States box office. The film won the award for Best Low-Budget Film at the 9th Saturn Awards in 1982.

== Plot ==
A Roman Catholic priest, Father Damon, murders a man outside a castle-like estate on an island in upstate New York. The man he kills claims to be Lucifer himself, and promises to return. Decades later, in 1963, Andrew Williams is born. After his mother is paralyzed under mysterious circumstances, Andrew's father realizes something is peculiar about his son, eventually coming to the realization that Andrew is the son of Lucifer. In 1980, as a senior in high school, Andrew is academically brilliant, but withdrawn and socially awkward. Consequently, he is often bullied by his peers. Andrew feels drawn to the estate where Father Damon committed the murder, which is due for demolition for an impending golf course.

At school one day, one of Andrew's tormentors, Tony, attempts to harass him in the gym shower. Overcome by strange powers, Tony kisses him in front of their peers. The event leaves Tony hysterical, and he leaves, terrified of Andrew. Later, Andrew is notified that he has received scholarships to several Ivy League colleges, including Yale and Harvard, but is indifferent to the news. Meanwhile, a local elderly woman, Margaret, visits Father Daly at his parish, and discusses Damon, whom she knew personally; Father Daly insists Damon wrongly murdered the man, though Margaret believes he was in fact Lucifer, and Father Damon, a manifestation of the archangel Raphael. One of Margaret's few friends is actually Andrew's father, the local mailman, who always talks to her when he makes his deliveries. He insists that Father Damon was a good man and a good priest, and that the town did him a disservice by convicting him.

During a gym class, one of Andrew's classmates, Mark, is crushed against the bleachers by a thrown dodgeball and dies. Mark's girlfriend, Julie, is distraught, and shortly after begins having bizarre visions of Andrew raping her. She later hears voices calling her Gabrielle (a feminization of archangel Gabriel), and is directed to Margaret's home by the disembodied voice of Father Damon. Margaret appoints Julie her protégé to battle Andrew.

On the night of a school dance, Andrew arrives at the castle estate and invokes Leviathan and Beelzebub, and summons the undead from grave sites on the property. At a local bar, Andrew's father drunkenly raves about his son being the devil before returning home and shooting his wife in the head. Simultaneously, a group from the school is showing an outdoor play retelling the life of Jesus. During the scene of the crucifixion, the actor onstage playing Jesus begins exhibiting real stigmata, causing the audience to flee in horror.

On the island, a group of teenagers arrive to party after the dance, including Tony, his girlfriend Marie, Brenda, and others. After arriving at the castle, they are accosted by the undead. Marie is killed, and Tony and Brenda flee to an upstairs room, where Tony finds he has inexplicably developed breasts. Andrew enters the room and kisses him, after which Tony stabs himself to death to avoid getting raped. Andrew carries Brenda outside and lays her on an altar, where he stabs her to death.

Margaret and Julie arrive on the scene, brandishing Father Damon's processional cross, which causes Andrew to recoil. Margaret forces Andrew to recite the Lord's Prayer, and he transforms into Mark, tricking Julie. Margaret intervenes, and he kills her by breaking her neck. Julie watches as Andrew transforms into Lucifer, but is able to defeat him with the power of Father Damon's crucifix. The spirits of Julie, Father Damon, and Margaret—the three archangels—coalesce, as Andrew is engulfed and destroyed in a beam of a light.

== Cast ==
- Stefan Arngrim as Andrew Williams
- Elizabeth Hoffman as Margaret Buchanan / Mikhail
- Kathleen Rowe McAllen as Julie / Gabrielle
- Frank Birney as Father Daly
- Daniel Eden as Tony
- John Holland as Father Damon / Rafael
- Barry Cooper as Mr. Williams
- Alice Sachs as Mrs. Williams
- Paul Haber as Mark
- Roslyn Gugino as Marie
- Richard Jay Silverthorn as Lucifer
- Mari Anne Simpson as Brenda
- Joyce Bumpus as Susan
- Patricia Decillis as Bette
- Chris DeVincentis as Richard

== Production ==
=== Filming ===
LaLoggia and his cousin, Charles LaLoggia, secured $25,000 from local investors in 1978 for their own production company, and later accrued a further $550,000 to begin production of the film. Fear No Evil was shot in LaLoggia's hometown of Rochester, New York, with some scenes in Webster and Heart Island, in the late summer and fall of 1979 under the working title of Mark of the Beast. Additional photography occurred in Thousand Islands. The historic Boldt Castle is featured in the film. Filming was impeded several times due to weather conditions, including snowfall during the shooting of the film's climactic sequence.

=== Post-production ===
After the completion of principal photography, an additional $250,000 was needed to complete the film's special effects. Avco Embassy Pictures, who signed on to distribute the film, agreed to cover the post-production costs. Special effects creator Peter Kuran worked with his company Visual Concept Engineering for a total of four months to complete the film's final sequence.

After presenting three different cuts of the film to Avco Embassy, LaLoggia and production associate Donald P. Borchers reached "a fine compromise," which included the addition of numerous punk rock and new wave songs that were incorporated into the film's soundtrack. The film was officially completed in November 1980. LaLoggia commented after its release that making it "taught me important things about myself, and the considerable struggle of dealing with the dichotomy of movie-making, the commercial-business aspects versus the creative end."

== Soundtrack ==
Fear No Evil's soundtrack featured many punk and new wave bands from the late 1970s and early 1980s:

- "Hey Joe" performed by Patti Smith
- "Someone's Gonna Get Their Head Kicked In Tonight" performed by The Rezillos
- "Blitzkrieg Bop" performed by the Ramones
- "Psycho Killer" performed by Talking Heads
- "Love Goes to a Building on Fire" performed by Talking Heads
- "Delicious Gone Wrong" performed by Bim
- "I Don't Like Mondays" performed by The Boomtown Rats
- "Lava" performed by The B-52's
- "Blank Generation" performed by Richard Hell
- "Anarchy in the UK" performed by the Sex Pistols
- "Fear No Evil" performed by Trybe

== Release ==
Fear No Evil had a sneak preview screening in Long Beach, California on November 24, 1980. A special invitation-only screening of the film for cast, crew, and local residents in Rochester was held on December 4, 1980.

The film was released nationwide by Avco Embassy Pictures on January 16, 1981. LaLoggia commented that he felt Avco Embassy's advertising campaign played up the high school elements of the film, particularly with the theatrical poster showing a high school yearbook engulfed in flames: "I feel the film has a lot more happening than the youth angle. Avco is absolutely terrified that the religious angles would turn people off."

=== Home media ===
Fear No Evil was released on VHS by Embassy Home Entertainment in 1983 then on DVD by Anchor Bay Entertainment on July 22, 2003. Scream Factory released a Blu-ray edition of the film on September 24, 2019.

== Reception ==
=== Box office ===
The film grossed $3 million at the U.S. box office.

=== Critical response ===
Variety described it as "spooky and surreal" and "strong on atmospherics". The Fort Lauderdale News's Candice Russell praised the film as "an admirable debut... Slick and handsome, Fear No Evil features nifty special effects like the emanations from the transmogrified Lucifer and the glittery beams from a laser-like gold cross." Tom Buckley of the New York Times was not impressed, however, comparing it unfavorably to the films of George Romero, and writing, "The dialogue and characterizations are rudimentary. Of the acting and the direction, the best that can be said is that they would not disgrace a small-city drama club." Bill von Maurer of The Miami News noted that "there is a germ of a good idea in Fear No Evil," but felt that the plot "meanders and frequently plunges into the obtuse." Joe Baltake of the Philadelphia Daily News noted that the film appears to borrow elements from such films as Carrie (1976), but summarized it favorably: "Thanks to some genuinely sincere and solid emoting from its cast and some semblance of substance, Fear No Evil not only effectively scares the daylights out of you, but also sticks to the ribs of the mind."

Robert Alan Ross of the Tampa Bay Times praised the film's cinematography, but added that "not even the most competent editor could improve Fear No Evil." Linda Gross of the Los Angeles Times made similar praises about the cinematography, writing that the film "contains sublime poetic imagery. The photography by Fred Goodich is beautiful and the music (including much punk) is superbly melodramatic. As for the negative, the film exploits sex and religion, contains some very corny dialogue and has one of the sickest sex scenes in recent history." Gross also added that she felt the film may have contained an implicit homophobic message: "The main problem with reviewing Fear No Evil is that it's a film in which Lucifer seems gay. If that's the film maker's intention, it extends the probability that the material is, at least, latently homophobic...If neither the film maker nor the actor portraying Lucifer intends to imply sexuality or gender, then, the reviewer stands corrected."

On the review aggregator website Rotten Tomatoes, 50% of 12 critics' reviews are positive. Audiences polled by CinemaScore gave the film an average grade of "D-" on an A+ to F scale.

In the years since its original release, Fear No Evil has established a small following as a cult film.

=== Accolades ===
Association	Year	Category	Recipient(s) and nominee(s)	Result	Refs.
Saturn Awards	1982	Best Low-Budget Film	Fear No Evil	Won	

== In other media ==
The film's original theatrical trailer appeared on the 2020 compilation film The AGFA Horror Trailer Show.

== Sources ==
- Donahue, Suzanne Mary (1987). American Film Distribution: The Changing Marketplace. Ann Arbor, Michigan: UMI Research Press. ISBN 978-0-835-71776-2.
- Drebit, Scott (2024). A Cut Below: A Celebration of B Horror Movies, 1950s-1980s. Jefferson, North Carolina: McFarland & Company. ISBN 978-1-476-69195-4.
- Mitchell, Charles P. (2015). The Devil on Screen: Feature Films Worldwide, 1913 Through 2000. Jefferson, North Carolina: McFarland & Company. ISBN 978-1-476-60533-3.
