= Frank LaLoggia =

American film director

- Born: January 12, 1954 (age 72); Rochester, New York, U.S.
- Occupations: Director, writer, producer, film composer, actor
- Website: franklaloggia.com

Frank LaLoggia (born January 12, 1954) is an American film director, screenwriter, producer, actor and composer. LaLoggia appeared in several films before making his directorial debut with the horror film Fear No Evil (1981). His second feature was the mystery horror film Lady in White (1988), starring Lukas Haas and Alex Rocco.

== Biography ==
LaLoggia was born into an Italian American family in Rochester, New York. He made his feature film debut as a director and writer with the horror film Fear No Evil (1981). His second directorial feature, Lady in White (1988), was partly based on his own upbringing, as well as a local legend in Rochester. Though a box-office bomb, Lady in White received favorable reviews. In 1989, LaLoggia appeared in a minor role in The Wizard of Speed and Time, before directing the made-for-television film Mother (1995), starring Diane Ladd and Olympia Dukakis.

In the 1980s and 1990s, LaLoggia worked on a planned drama entitled The Giant, about the creation of Michelangelo's David statue. It was based on an original screenplay he wrote himself in Italy, and the film at one time was set to star Willem Dafoe. "I've come close," said LaLoggia in 1995. "I'm trying to make it happen independently but I've got a budget of $18 million — it's tough to get it done independently."

Currently, LaLoggia resides in the village of San Casciano in Val di Pesa near Florence in Tuscany, Italy.

== Filmography ==
Year	Title	Director	Writer	Producer	Composer	Actor	Notes	Ref.
1970	The Clown and the Light	Yes	Yes	Yes	Yes	Yes	Amateur shorts	
1971	Willowpoint	Yes	Yes	Yes	Yes	No	Amateur shorts	
1973	Gabriel	Yes	Yes	Yes	Yes	Yes	Amateur shorts	
1981	Fear No Evil	Yes	Yes	Yes	Yes	No		
1988	Lady in White	Yes	Yes	Yes	Yes	Uncredited	Role: Adult Frankie	
1995	Mother	Yes	Uncredited	No	No	No	Original title: The Haunted Heart	
2012	Miro/Miranda!	Yes	Yes	Yes	Yes	Yes	10-minute feature film promo	

== Discography ==
- A Cue with a View (2024)
