= Brett Leonard =

American film director

- Born: May 14, 1959 (age 67); Toledo, Ohio, U.S.
- Occupations: Director, writer, producer
- Spouse: Gimel Everett

Brett Leonard (born May 14, 1959) is an American filmmaker, specializing in the science fiction and horror genres. A few of his films such as The Lawnmower Man (1992) and Virtuosity (1995) feature groundbreaking computer animation and visual effects.

The Lawnmower Man is considered the first, seminal film to feature "virtual reality" as a cautionary tale becoming the number one commercially successful independent film of 1992, budgeted at just under $6 million and eventually earning over $150 million worldwide.

== Career ==
Leonard's work with the IMAX 3D process set him apart from most directors having gained early experience with this cutting-edge presentation medium directing T-Rex: Back to the Cretaceous in IMAX 3D. The film became the first number-one hit 3D movie to gross over $100 million worldwide (on IMAX screens alone).

He created a sensation when he took his Swarm Cam-Fusion Station onto The Tonight Show with Jay Leno and, with guest Billy Idol, implemented one of the first live web-casts ever from the House of Blues in Los Angeles.

Creative Artists Agency and Intel Corporation hired him to direct a state-of-the-art "interactive show" for CAA/Intel Media Lab to introduce the Hollywood community to the "future of entertainment", digitizing actor Danny DeVito, and using live performance animation to create the interactive animated character "Mr. Head", who guided the audience/participants through the experience.

In the music video genre, Brett directed Peter Gabriel's: "Kiss That Frog", the first all-computer graphic (CGI) music video/motion simulator ride film to tour the world, becoming the wildly popular themed entertainment attraction to win him a 1994 MTV Music Video Award.

In 2009, Brett directed the documentary Hole in the Head: A Life Revealed. This feature-length documentary tells the story of Vertus Hardiman and nine other young children, attending the same elementary school in Lyles Station, Indiana who, in 1927 were severely irradiated during a medical experiment conducted at the local county hospital. The experiment was misrepresented as a newly developed cure for the scalp fungus known as ringworm. In reality the ringworm fungus was merely the lure used to gain access to innocent children whose unsuspecting parents blindly signed permission slips for the treatment. Vertus was five years old and the youngest; after 20 years of friendship with writer/producer Wilbert Smith through their church choir, Vertus tells Wilbert his story, exposing the severe physical complications caused by the experiments. This crime had severe physical complications for Vertus—namely a harshly irradiated and malformed head, with an actual hole in his skull.

In 2012, Brett formed a new concept in musical cinema, called PopFictionLife. Seeing the proliferation of small high-definition screens on smart phones, tablets, and laptops, PopfictionLife "FragFilms" are full-length feature movies with existing artists, that have multiple free "Frags" (fragments) of the movie which are watchable, shareable, and embeddable in social media, blogs, and webpages. Brett's latest film is a PopFictionLife FragFilm called The Other Country – Starring Burlap to Cashmere. The film also stars Samantha Lockwood and America's Next Top Model winner Nicole Fox.

In 2017, he called for a use of the term "virtual experience" instead of "virtual reality".

In 2021, Leonard directed the sports drama Triumph, starring RJ Mitte and Terrence Howard.

== Personal life ==
Leonard was married to writer-producer Gimel Everett, until her death in 2011.

== Filmography ==
=== Film ===
Year	Title	Director	Writer	Notes
1989	The Dead Pit	Yes	Yes	Also editor
1992	The Lawnmower Man	Yes	Yes	
1995	Hideaway	Yes	No	
1995	Virtuosity	Yes	No	
1998	T-Rex: Back to the Cretaceous	Yes	No	
1999	Siegfried & Roy: The Magic Box	Yes	Yes	
2005	Feed	Yes	No	
2009	Truth?	Yes	Yes	
2021	Triumph	Yes	No	

Acting roles

Year	Title	Role	Notes
1988	Killer Klowns from Outer Space	Klown Performer (Jumbo)	Uncredited
1989	The Dead Pit	Bearded Mental Patient	Uncredited
2005	Man-Thing	Val Mayerick	

=== Television ===
Year	Title	Director	Writer	Notes
2005	Man-Thing	Yes	No	
2007	Highlander: The Source	Yes	No	

=== Documentary works ===
Year	Title	Director	Writer	Notes
2009	Hole in the Head: A Life Revealed	Yes	Yes	
2012	The Other Country – Starring Burlap to Cashmere	Yes	Yes	Also a producer

Producer

- Texas (2002)
- Take Me to the River (2014)

=== Music video ===
Year	Title	Artist
1990	"Step Off"	MC Twist
1993	"Kiss That Frog"	Peter Gabriel
1993	"Shock to the System"	Billy Idol
1993	"Heroin"	Billy Idol
2003	"If U Want Me"	Michael Woods feat. Imogen Bailey
2004	"Play"	Peter Gabriel
