= Bodach =

Trickster or bogeyman figure in Gaelic folklore and mythology

A bodach (Scottish Gaelic pronunciation: [ˈpɔt̪əx]; plural bodaich "old man; rustic, churl, lout"; Old Irish botach) is a trickster or bogeyman figure in Gaelic folklore and mythology. The bodach "old man" is paired with the cailleach "hag, old woman" in Irish legend.

== Name ==
Bodach (Old Irish also botach) is the Irish word for a tenant, a serf or peasant. It is derived from bod (Old Irish bod) "tail, penis".

The word has alternatively been derived from both "cottage, hut" (probably a borrowing from Old Norse, as is English booth). The term botach "tenant farmer" is thus equivalent to a cotter (the cotarius of the Domesday Book); a daer botach was a half-free peasant of a lower class. In either case, the name is formed by the addition of nominal suffix -ach ("connected or involved with, belonging to, having").

In modern Gaelic, bodach simply means "old man", often used affectionately.

In the Echtra Condla, one "Boadach the Eternal" is king of Mag Mell. This name is derived from buadhach "victorious" and unrelated to botach in origin. However, the two names may have become associated by the early modern period, as Manannan is also named king of Mag Mell, and the bodach figure in Eachtra Bhodaigh an Chóta Lachtna (17th century) is in turn identified with Manannan.

== In Gaelic folklore ==
In modern Gaelic (Scottish and Irish) folklore, the bodach or "old man" becomes a type of bugbear, to the point of being identified with the devil.

In the early modern (16th or 17th century) tale Eachtra Bhodaigh an Chóta Lachtna, the bodach is identified with the Manannán mac Lir. This identification inspired Lady Gregory's tale "Manannan at Play" (Gods and Fighting Men, 1904), where Manannan makes an appearance in disguise as "a clown ... old striped clothes he had, and puddle water splashing in his shoes, and his sword sticking out naked behind him, and his ears through the old cloak that was over his head, and in his hand he had three spears of hollywood scorched and blackened."

In Scottish folklore the bodach comes down the chimney to kidnap naughty children, used as a cautionary tale or bogeyman figure to frighten children into good behaviour. A related being known as the Bodach Glas ("Old Grey Man") is considered an omen of death. In Walter Scott's novel, Waverley, Fergus Mac-Ivor sees a Bodach Glas, which foretells his death. In W. B. Yeats's 1903 prose version of The Hour-Glass, the character of the Fool remarks at one point during the play that a bodach he met upon the roadside attempted to trick him with a riddle into letting the creature near his coin.

== References in popular culture ==
- Bodachs are seen at the beginning of Moonshine by Rob Thurman.
- Bodachs occasionally appear in Charles de Lint's books of mythic fiction.
- The term Bodach is used to describe shadow-like or "ink like" creatures—invisible to most people—that appear at locations before disasters in the books Odd Thomas, Forever Odd, Brother Odd, Odd Hours, Odd Apocalypse, Odd Interlude, Deeply Odd, and Saint Odd by Dean Koontz. These can be seen only by Odd.
- Bodachs appear as evil goblin spearmen, in Alan Garner's fantasy novel The Moon of Gomrath, in which they have shining bald heads, bodies covered in flat locks of hair and the legs of birds.
- An end game boss in the videogame Path of Exile 2 goes by the name "The Bodach" and is depicted as a large quadrupedal beast resembling a Wendigo.

== See also ==
- Bodak, an undead creature in the Dungeons & Dragons fantasy role-playing game
- Brownie (folklore), a domestic spirit in British folklore
- Cailleach, a divine hag, a creator deity, a weather deity, and an ancestor deity in Gaelic mythology
- Wirry-cow, a bugbear or demon in Scottish folklore
