= Charnel House (publisher) =

U.S. horror fiction publishing house

- Company type: Private
- Industry: Publishing
- Genre: Horror
- Founded: Catskill, New York, U.S. (1989)
- Founder: Joe Stefko
- Headquarters: Catskill, New York, U.S.
- Area served: Worldwide
- Products: Limited edition books
- Website: www.charnelhouse.com

Charnel House is a horror fiction publishing house, specializing in limited edition books noted for their craftsmanship. Examples being The Regulators (1996, by Stephen King writing under the pseudonym Richard Bachman) which featured bullets protruding from the front board and Last Call (1992, by Tim Powers) which featured endpapers made from untrimmed sheets of American dollar bills. Several of their releases are unavailable in any other format.

== Works published by Charnel House ==
=== 2008 ===
- Odd Hours by Dean Koontz, 300 numbered copies and 26 lettered copies

=== 2007 ===
- The Darkest Evening of the Year by Dean Koontz, 350 numbered copies and 26 lettered copies
- The Good Guy by Dean Koontz, 350 numbered copies and 26 lettered copies
- You Suck: A Love Story by Christopher Moore, 250 numbered copies and 26 lettered copies

=== 2006 ===
- Forever Odd by Dean Koontz, 300 numbered copies and 26 lettered copies
- The Husband by Dean Koontz, 300 numbered copies and 26 lettered copies
- Brother Odd by Dean Koontz, 300 numbered copies and 26 lettered copies

=== 2005 ===
- Velocity by Dean Koontz, 300 numbered copies and 26 lettered copies
- Frankenstein by Dean Koontz, 750 numbered copies and 26 lettered copies

=== 2004 ===
- Life Expectancy by Dean Koontz, 300 numbered copies and 26 lettered copies
- The Taking by Dean Koontz, 300 numbered copies and 26 lettered copies

=== 2003 ===
- Odd Thomas by Dean Koontz, 500 numbered copies and 26 lettered copies
- The Face by Dean Koontz, 500 numbered copies and 26 lettered copies
- The Book of Counted Sorrows by Dean Koontz, 1250 numbered copies and 26 lettered copies

=== 2001 ===
- From the Corner of His Eye by Dean Koontz, 500 numbered copies and 26 lettered copies

=== 2000 ===
- My Own Choice by Keith Reid, 500 numbered copies and 26 lettered copies

=== 1996 ===
- The Regulators by Stephen King as Richard Bachman, 500 numbered copies and 52 lettered copies

=== 1995 ===
- Where They Are Hid by Tim Powers, 350 numbered copies and 26 lettered copies

=== 1994 ===
- Dark Rivers of the Heart by Dean Koontz, 500 numbered copies and 26 lettered copies

=== 1992 ===
- Beastchild by Dean Koontz, 750 numbered copies and 26 lettered copies
- Last Call by Tim Powers, 350 numbered copies and 26 lettered copies

=== 1991 ===
- The New Neighbor by Ray Garton, 500 numbered copies and 26 lettered copies

=== 1989 ===
- The Stress of Her Regard by Tim Powers, 500 numbered copies and 26 lettered copies
