= Odd Thomas =

Odd Thomas may refer to:

- Odd Thomas (character), featured in several novels by Dean Koontz
- Odd Thomas (novel), the first of such novels
- Odd Thomas (film), a 2013 film based on the Dean Koontz novel of the same name.
