= Odd Thomas: You Are Destined to Be Together Forever =

2014 novella by Dean Koontz

- First edition
- Author: Dean Koontz
- Language: English
- Genre: Thriller, Mystery
- Publisher: Bantam Books
- Publication date: December 9, 2014
- Publication place: United States
- Media type: E-book
- Pages: 38
- Preceded by: Deeply Odd
- Followed by: Saint Odd

Odd Thomas: You Are Destined to Be Together Forever (2014) is the second novella and eighth text included in the Odd Thomas series by American writer Dean Koontz.

== Plot summary ==
This short novella returns to the roots of the pivotal character to explore the beginnings of his relationship with Stormy Llewellyn. The ghost of Elvis makes a return here, as does another ghostly figure that will propel the young couple into an adventure that will end with their attaining the prediction that they shall spend eternity with one another. The final full-length novel in the series, Saint Odd, was to be released in January 2015.
