= Forever Odd =

2005 novel by Dean Koontz

- Cover of Forever Odd
- Author: Dean Koontz
- Cover artist: Tom Hallman
- Language: English
- Genre: Suspense, Psychological
- Publisher: Bantam Publishing
- Publication date: 2005
- Publication place: United States
- Media type: Print (hardback & paperback)
- Pages: 352 pp
- ISBN: 0-553-80416-2
- OCLC: 61282157
- Dewey Decimal: 813/.54 22
- LC Class: PS3561.O55 F66 2006b
- Preceded by: Odd Thomas
- Followed by: Brother Odd

Forever Odd is a 2005 novel by Dean Koontz, and the sequel to Odd Thomas. The plot takes place six months after the events of Odd Thomas.

== Plot summary ==
After Odd Thomas discovers that his childhood friend Danny has been kidnapped and his step-father brutally murdered, he assumes that Danny's birth father, who was recently released from prison, has kidnapped him. Because of this belief, Odd starts to investigate, and is led through a water tunnel and into an abandoned hotel by his "psychic magnetism," an ability of Odd's to track down who, or what he is visualizing.

Inside, Odd finds his friend tied up and strapped to a bomb. Danny informs Odd that his dad did not kidnap him. Instead, Danny recounts that, because of his loneliness from a debilitating bone disease, he called a phone sex line and spoke with a woman named Datura. Danny, having been seduced by this woman, had eventually given up the information of Odd's "gift." Once this registered in her mind, she kidnapped Danny in order to have Odd reveal himself to her.

Odd leaves Danny and finds Datura in her room with two thugs, Cheval Robert and Cheval Andre. She orders Odd to show her ghosts. Reluctantly, Odd takes her to the casino in the hotel where he previously saw many ghosts and one poltergeist. Datura insults a ghost, and the enraged poltergeist flings objects at them. At this point, Odd escapes from Datura, returns to Danny, and disarms the bomb. Odd returns to Datura's room and finds a shotgun, which he uses to kill Cheval Robert. Datura finds him by "reverse psychic magnetism"; as they are talking, a mountain lion attacks her from behind. An angry Cheval Andre chases Odd through the hotel, before Odd kills Cheval Andre in a sewer.

Odd dies in the sewer, and his spirit visits three of his friends. He comes back to life, however, in front of the Blue Moon Café with no idea how he got there. At first he is dismayed at his survival, as his dearest hope is to be reunited with his soul-mate, Bronwen "Stormy" Llewellyn, in the afterlife. Odd accompanies the Chief Porter to the hotel, where they go back to retrieve Danny from that terrible place. Two months later, Odd makes plans to work in a monastery high in the mountains in an attempt to find peace.

== Characters ==
=== Odd Thomas ===
Odd Thomas, the protagonist, has the ability to see the lingering dead. He must save his friend, Danny Jessup, from an insane, masochistic occultist calling herself Datura.

=== Danny Jessup ===
Danny is Odd's childhood friend, Datura kidnaps him after he reveals to her about Odd's supernatural ability to see the lingering dead, on a phone sex line. His bone disease, Osteogenesis Imperfecta, makes him susceptible to bone fractures.

=== Datura ===
A phone sex operator obsessed with the occult. She, and her crew, kidnap Danny to draw Odd to her and gain control over his supernatural ability. Although not specifically pointed out in the novel, Datura is the name of a genus of poisonous shrubs that includes jimsonweed. These are related to the genus brugmansia (which are trees), and a brugmansia tree is described in the book.

=== Cheval Andre ===
Cheval Andre is the larger of Datura's servants and the one who shows the least emotion. He is described by Odd as a "freight train" or a "locomotive." Andre pursues Odd into the flood control system after Odd lets a mountain lion kill Datura. The two fight each other until Odd manages to slash into Andre's stomach with a fishing knife. As Andre dies, he wrestles the knife from Odd's hands and is able to slash him across the chest. Andre then dies, his clothing caught on the floodgate. Robert and Andre may be zombies, animated by Datura's ti bon ange. They appear to have a hunger for flesh. Also, they never speak and they disappear after being "killed".

=== Cheval Robert ===
Cheval Robert is the smaller of Datura's servants, but is still quite strong. He shows far more emotion than Andre (which still isn't much). When Odd meets Datura for the first time, Andre stands next to her at the window and observes the storm. Robert instead chooses to watch the candles with a childlike intrigue. When Andre and Robert are given the job of guarding the lanterns for Odd and Datura in the casino, Andre stands firm and silent, while Robert appears to be a bit nervous. Odd encounters Robert in a hotel suite while hiding from Datura. Robert is immediately aware of Odd, but chooses to ignore him, choosing to watch the storm at the window first. Robert then turns to Odd and walks toward him, never bothering to raise his revolver. At this moment, Robert makes the only noise heard from either he or Andre. It is a low pitched groan that sounds exasperated. Robert then begins to raise his revolver hand. Odd shoots Robert four times with a shotgun, causing him to fall off the hotel balcony. His body disappears. Robert and Andre are perhaps zombies, animated by Datura's stolen ti bon ange (Good Little Angel). They appear to have a hunger for flesh and they never speak.

== Quotes ==
- "If one's friends do not openly laugh at him, they are not in fact his friends. How else would one learn to avoid saying those things that would elicit laughter from strangers? The mockery of friends is affectionate and inocculates from foolishness."

== Odd Series ==
Forever Odd is the second of seven novels about Odd Thomas; the first being Odd Thomas, the third Brother Odd, the fourth Odd Hours, the fifth Odd Apocalypse, the sixth Deeply Odd, and the seventh Saint Odd.
