= Clann Lir (band) =

- Origin: Moscow, RF
- Genres: Celtic folk; traditional folk
- Years active: 2003 —

Clann Lir (from Irish - "Children of Lir") is a Russian folk collective that has evolved into a supergroup, performing ancient Celtic songs from Ireland, Scotland, and Wales. The Clann Lir ensemble is a side project of some of the leaders in the field of popular music in Moscow. These include the singer-songwriter Hellawes of Melnitsa (a band she formed in 1999), the bagpiper Vladimir Lazerson of Tintal, the vocalist Yuri Andreychuk of Voinstvo Sidov, and the composer and keyboard player Konstantin Vyshinsky.

Unlike the main bands of members, Clann Lir does not perform their own compositions in folk music or folk rock styles. Instead, they perform traditional Celtic folk songs. Their repertoire includes songs in the languages of the Celtic peoples (Irish, Gaelic, and Welsh), as well as secular Irish music from the 18th century.

The band's name, which translates from Irish to "Children of Lir" or "Family of Lir", is inspired by the ancient Irish legend of the same name.

== History ==
The band was founded in 2003 by experienced musicians from the Moscow Celtic music scene. The initial lineup included Natalia O'Shea, Vladimir Lazerson, Yuri Andreychuk, and Konstantin Vyshinsky.

The group began performing in clubs in Moscow, the capital of the Russian Federation (abbr. RF) at the time, and St. Petersburg.

By the time the band Clann Lir was formed, its members had achieved some success and fame as part of several folk-rock groups: Melnitsa, Tintal, and Slua Si (The Sidhe Host). Therefore, their side project Clann Lir can be considered a supergroup.

The band's debut album, titled Clann Lir, was released in 2005, although it is still not awailable in the Russian department of Apple Music as a comparatively exotic country and/or music market to sell this style of music. The album's launch concert took place on March 20, 2005, at the Veresk Club in Moscow as part of the four-day "Celts Non-Stop" festival, which was timed to coincide with St. Patrick's Day.

In 2006, [Celtic] harpist Tatyana Strunina joined the group. The album Clann Lir was reissued in 2008 by Perekrestok Records.

== Discography ==
- Clann Lir (2005)

== Band members ==
- Natalia O'Shea — vocals, guitar, Celtic harp
- Yuriy Andreychuk — vocals, bodhran
- Vladimir Lazerson — bagpipes, flutes, lute, mandolin
- Konstantin Vyshinsky — spinet (harpsichord), synthesizer, dulcimer
- Tatiana Strunina — [Celtic] harp
