= Oz Comic Con =

International entertainment and comic convention in Australia

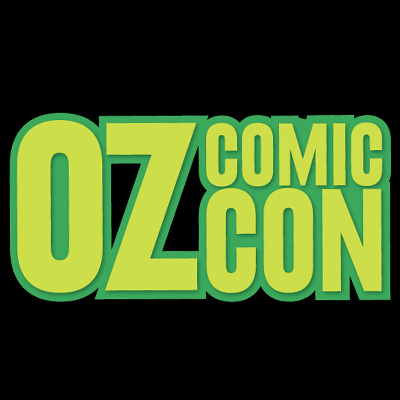
- Status: Active
- Genre: Speculative fiction
- Venue: Various
- Country: Australia
- Inaugurated: 2012
- Organizer: Expertise Events
- Website: www.ozcomiccon.com

Oz Comic Con is a speculative fiction entertainment and comic convention that has been running since 2012 within various major Australian cities, and is a local franchise of the New York Comic Con. Attendees have included Nintendo Australia. Oz Comic Con in 2025 will run in the cities of Perth, Adelaide, Melbourne, Canberra, Brisbane, and Sydney.

== Locations and dates ==
Year	Location	Venue	Dates	Guests
2012	Adelaide	Adelaide Showground	31 March – 1 April	Sean Astin, Ben Browder, Debi Derryberry, Gigi Edgley, Jonathan Frakes, Corin Nemec, Queenie Chan, Norman Reedus, Sean Schemmel Jewel Staite
2012	Melbourne	Melbourne Convention & Exhibition Centre	30 June – 1 July	Todd Haberkorn, Stan Lee, Sean Maher, Jason Momoa, Corin Nemec, Chris Sabat, Armin Shimerman, Patrick Stewart, Eric Vale
2013	Adelaide	Adelaide Showground	2–3 March	Paul Eiding, Colin Ferguson (actor), J. G. Hertzler, Eddie McClintock, Jason Momoa, Robert O'Reilly, Teryl Rothery, Chris Sabat, William Shatner
2013	Perth	Perth Convention & Exhibition Centre	9–10 March	Gigi Edgley, Paul Eiding, Colin Ferguson (actor), J. G. Hertzler, Eddie McClintock, Jason Momoa, Robert O'Reilly, Teryl Rothery, Chris Sabat, William Shatner
2013	Melbourne	Royal Exhibition Building	6–7 July	Rodger Bumpass, Tia Carrere, Debi Derryberry, Gigi Edgley, Colin Ferguson (actor), Erin Fitzgerald, Neil Grayston, Rob Paulsen, William Shatner
2014	Perth	Perth Convention & Exhibition Centre	29–30 March	John Billingsley, Todd Haberkorn, Mike McFarland, Corin Nemec, Rob Paulsen, Sean Schemmel, Kevin Sorbo, Jewel Staite, Amanda Tapping, Connor Trinneer, Nana Visitor
2014	Adelaide	Adelaide Showground	5–6 April	John Billingsley, Benedict Cumberbatch, Todd Haberkorn, Mike McFarland, Corin Nemec, Rob Paulsen, Billie Piper, Sean Schemmel, Kevin Sorbo, Jewel Staite, Amanda Tapping, Connor Trinneer, Nana Visitor
2014	Melbourne	Royal Exhibition Building	5–6 July	Dante Basco, Arthur Darvill, Aron Eisenberg, Robert Englund, Max Grodenchik
2014	Brisbane	Brisbane Convention & Exhibition Centre	6–7 September	Nicholas Brendon, Rodger Bumpass, Emma Caulfield, Jim Cummings, Paul Eiding, Colin Ferguson (actor), Christopher Judge, Eddie McClintock, Jason Momoa, Queenie Chan, Monica Rial, William Shatner
2014	Sydney	Sydney Exhibition Centre @ Glebe Island	13–14 September	Nicholas Brendon, Rodger Bumpass, Emma Caulfield, Jim Cummings, Paul Eiding, Colin Ferguson (actor), Christopher Judge, Eddie McClintock, Jason Momoa, Corin Nemec, Queenie Chan, Monica Rial, William Shatner, Mark Sheppard
2015	Perth	Perth Convention & Exhibition Centre	11–12 April	Ben Browder, Emma Caulfield, Robert Englund, Neil Kaplan, Dominic Keating, Jason Marsden, Billie Piper, Monica Rial, Michael Shanks, Cliff Simon, Marina Sirtis, Kevin Sorbo
2015	Adelaide	Adelaide Showground	18–19 April	Dante Basco, Ben Browder, Robert Englund, Neil Kaplan, Dominic Keating, Michael Shanks, Cliff Simon, Kevin Sorbo
2015	Melbourne	Melbourne Convention & Exhibition Centre	27–28 June	Jewel Staite Bruce Campbell
2015	Brisbane	Brisbane Convention & Exhibition Centre	19–20 September	Dante Basco, Daniel Ewing, Todd Haberkorn, David Hewlett, Mike McFarland, Queenie Chan, Mark Sheppard, Rikki Simons, Kevin Smith, Tavisha Wolfgarth-Simons
2015	Sydney	Sydney Exhibition Centre @ Glebe Island	26–27 September	Dante Basco, Dan Ewing, Todd Haberkorn, David Hewlett, Mike McFarland, Queenie Chan, Rikki Simons, Tavisha Wolfgarth-Simons
2016	Perth	Perth Convention & Exhibition Centre	2–3 April	
2016	Adelaide	Adelaide Showground	9–10 April	
2016	Melbourne	Melbourne Convention & Exhibition Centre	11–12 June	Robert Patrick
2016	Sydney	Sydney Exhibition Centre @ Glebe Island	10–11 September	Robert Englund, Joe Flanigan, Charles Martinet, Queenie Chan, Katee Sackhoff, Karl Urban
2016	Brisbane	Brisbane Convention & Exhibition Centre	17–18 September	Robert Englund, Joe Flanigan, Charles Martinet, Queenie Chan, Karl Urban
2017	Perth	Perth Convention & Exhibition Centre	25–26 March	
2017	Adelaide	Adelaide Showground	1–2 April	
2017	Melbourne	Melbourne Convention & Exhibition Centre	1–2 July	Alyson HanniganJoe Flanigan, Sylvester McCoy, Jason Momoa, Queenie Chan
2017	Brisbane	Brisbane Convention & Exhibition Centre	23–24 September	W. Chew Chan, Jenna Coleman, Paul Eiding, Mark Meer, Jason Momoa, Queenie Chan, Catrin Stewart
2017	Sydney	International Convention Centre Sydney	30 September - 1 October	W. Chew Chan, Jenna Coleman, Paul Eiding, David Giuntoli, Tom Hopper, Mark Meer, Jason Momoa, Queenie Chan, Denis O'Hare, Catrin Stewart, Bitsie Tulloch
2018	Melbourne	Melbourne Convention & Exhibition Centre	9–10 June	Corin Nemec, David Ramsey, David Sobolov, Clare Kramer, Keiynan Lonsdale, Katherine McNamara, Lauren German, Lesley-Ann Brandt
2018	Brisbane	Brisbane Convention & Exhibition Centre	22–23 September	
2018	Sydney	Sydney Showground	29–30 September	
2019	Melbourne	Melbourne Convention & Exhibition Centre	8–9 June	Dominic Sherwood, Alberto Rosende, DB Woodside, Clare Kramer, Rick Cosnett, Willa Holland, Colton Haynes, Sam Witwer, Tricia Helfer
2019	Brisbane	Brisbane Convention & Exhibition Centre	21–22 September	
2019	Sydney	International Convention Centre Sydney	28–29 September	
2021	Sydney	Sydney Showgrounds	6-7 March	4-5 December
2021	Brisbane	Brisbane Convention & Exhibition Centre	11–12 December	
2021	Adelaide	Adelaide Showground	Cancelled	
2021	Melbourne	Melbourne Convention & Exhibition Centre	27–28 November (date changed due to COVID-19 pandemic)	
2022	Adelaide	Adelaide Showground	21-22 May	
2022	Canberra	Exhibition Park in Canberra	27–28 August	
2022	Brisbane	Brisbane Convention & Exhibition Centre	17–18 September	
2022	Sydney	International Convention Centre Sydney	24–25 September	
