= The Book of Counted Sorrows =

Fictional book used as a motif by Dean Koontz

The Book of Counted Sorrows and The Book of Counted Joys are fictional books "quoted" as the source of various epigraphs in many of Dean Koontz's books. The books as cited sources do not actually exist; they are false documents.

Koontz has since released a book under the same title, collecting the various epigraphs and adding additional material.

== Fictional books ==
Koontz has, for many years, used epigraphs — short quotes at the start of books or chapters — as a literary device in his writings. These were often attributed to a source entitled, The Book of Counted Sorrows. Koontz also occasionally cites The Book of Counted Joys, such as the epigraph at the start of Odd Thomas.

For many years, Koontz fans searched for the elusive Counted Sorrows. Koontz and his publisher received up to 3,000 letters per year inquiring about it. Librarians reported spending many frustrated hours in their attempts to locate the non-existent title.

Koontz eventually disclosed that Sorrows was a fictional book; he had created both the title and the verses himself, to suit the story he was writing.

== Actual book ==
2001 ebook cover

Eventually, in response to reader demand, Koontz created an actual book with the title, The Book of Counted Sorrows. It collected all the "Sorrows" epigraphs published in Koontz's work to date, as well as previously-unpublished text. The 22,000-word introduction includes a fictional history of the book. That "history" asserts that those who read the full volume purportedly die in unusual and unpleasant ways, most often from their heads exploding.

This Sorrows was first published in 2001 in e-book format, offered through Barnes & Noble. It was the first title published by the Barnes & Noble Digital imprint, and was their best-selling e-book that year." This edition is no longer available.

Later in 2001, Charnel House announced two limited edition prints of the book: A 1250-copy numbered edition, and a 26-copy lettered edition.

In 2008, Dogged Press issued a 3000-copy hardcover edition.
