= Odd Thomas (character) =

- Odd Thomas books character
- First appearance: Odd Thomas
- Last appearance: Saint Odd
- Created by: Dean Koontz
- Portrayed by: Anthony Marks (webisodes); Anton Yelchin (film)

In-universe information
- Gender: male

Odd Thomas is a fictional character who first appeared in Dean Koontz's 2003 novel of the same name. He is a twenty-year-old man who lives in the fictional desert town of Pico Mundo, California, and is able to see the spirits of the dead. He is able to make himself heard to them but they cannot speak to him, although they may make signs or mouth words. This fact complicates much of the books.

The ghost of Elvis Presley was once a constant companion to him, until the end of Brother Odd, at which time Elvis moved on and the ghost of Frank Sinatra became Odd's new companion. Sinatra similarly left at the end of Odd Hours, shortly after an impressive display of poltergeist activity. In the fifth novel Odd Apocalypse he is visited by the ghost of Alfred Hitchcock, although he explains that he wishes to help him, but does not have enough time at the moment while trying to discover the secrets of the estate of Roseland. Mr. Hitchcock appears again in the sixth novel, Deeply Odd.

== Fictional character biography ==
Odd was told his name was originally intended to be "Todd", (or possibly "Dobb", after his uncle whom he has never met and may not exist) and his actual name stems from this error on his birth certificate. Odd lived at home with his mother until he was 16. His mother is a psychotic who refuses medical treatment. The mere thought of responsibility, love, or any adult emotions drives her into suicidal rage. Odd's father, another emotional cripple, divorced her when Odd was one year old. He never remarried but has become a serial philanderer with women that are barely/questionably legal. Odd was severely neglected and emotionally abused by his mother after his father left. If his mother couldn't hide from him, she would threaten to kill herself or Odd if he created "stressful" events. For example, when he was very sick as a child and wanted her to comfort him, she told him if he didn't stop crying she was going to shoot herself. During this same incident she also made him (Odd) look into the barrel of her loaded handgun and "look for the bright point of the bullet".

Odd's unique ability to see the dead (among other paranormal gifts) complicates his life and forms the basis of the novels. When the first novel begins he is a 20-year-old fry cook, with a particular proficiency for pancakes, living in the fictional California town of Pico Mundo. He uses his abilities to aid the lingering spirits who seek him out. The plot of the first novel centers on Odd and his girlfriend Stormy Llewellyn's attempt to prevent a mass murder in his hometown. Odd successfully minimizes the casualties of the scheme but Stormy is killed, changing the course of Odd's life.

The second novel, Forever Odd focuses on a battle of wits between Odd and an occult-obsessed seductress who has kidnapped Odd's childhood friend, hoping to attract Odd and steal his gift. In Brother Odd, Odd has retreated to a quiet life in St. Bartholomew's Abbey, where children are being stalked by paranormal creatures outside of Odd's experience. In the fourth novel, Odd Hours, Odd is drawn to Magic Beach where he experiences an apocalyptic dream and investigates a plot of cataclysmic proportions. During this novel he meets Annamaria, a mysterious woman who dubs Odd during their first conversation as her protector. At the end of the novel Annamaria accompanies Odd as the two depart Magic Beach, and Annamaria comforts Odd by mimicking a favorite pastime of Odd's and Stormy's. In the fifth book, Odd Apocalypse, Odd and Annamaria stay as guests at Roseland Manor where everything is not as it seems.

Odd's primary power is the ability to see ghosts and other departed spirits, primarily humans and dogs, though Odd has made allusions to others. The spirits never speak, though Odd does not know if this is due to inability or by choice until Odd Hours, when the spirit of a recently killed criminal attempts to speak to Odd and is surprised to find that it cannot be heard. Odd's second ability is a form of psychic magnetism, an ability to be drawn to places or people of import by allowing his instincts to take over. Another, less beneficial aspect of this ability is that if Odd is consciously trying avoid a particular someone or something, he will inevitably find or be found by that very person or thing. Despite the danger and misfortune this ability causes, Odd usually finds humor in the irony and speaks of it in an anecdotal fashion.

Additionally, Odd is able to foresee events due to his ability to see Bodachs, a term identified by a child he met who shortly after voicing the word, and in the presence of Bodachs, was killed in a somewhat mysterious accident by a truck driver.

== Friends ==
=== "Little Ozzie" ===
A jolly, 'four hundred pound', extremely intelligent, felinophile, and extremely successful mystery novelist and author of several factual books on art with six fingers on his left hand. In the 2013 film, Ozzie is played by Patton Oswalt.

=== Danny Jessup ===
Danny is Odd's best friend. In Forever Odd, Datura kidnaps him after he tells her about Odd's ability to see the dead on a phone sex line. He suffers from a bone disease that makes him susceptible to bone fractures.

=== Bronwen "Stormy" Llewellyn ===
Odd's girlfriend, soulmate, fiancée and destiny. In the first novel and the prequel graphic novel she would often call him "Odd one" or "Oddy." Odd believed that he and Stormy were 'destined to be together forever' due to an encounter with a carnival fortune-telling gypsy mummy. Stormy was killed in a torrent of gunfire at the end of the first novel. Odd is driven to persevere through this life and enter dangerous situations to aid the living and to help the 'lingering dead,' so that he can be reunited with Stormy in the next life which she called "Service." Addison Timlin plays Stormy in the film.

=== Chief Wyatt Porter ===
The Chief helps Odd many times, acting as a surrogate father and somewhat unwilling accomplice. He is one of the few people that know Odd sees the dead. He is shot four times, 3 times in the chest, by one of the people who would later shoot and kill many people at the mall, but survives. His wife, Karla, also cares deeply about Odd in a maternal role. Willem Dafoe plays the character in the film.

== Novels ==
- Odd Thomas (2003)
- Forever Odd (2005)
- Brother Odd (2006)
- Odd Hours (2008)
- In Odd We Trust (2008) (graphic novel prequel)
- Odd Is On Our Side (2010) (graphic novel prequel)
- House of Odd (2012) (graphic novel prequel)
- Odd Interlude (June 11, 18, and 25, 2012) (3-part novella)
- Odd Apocalypse (July 31, 2012)
- Deeply Odd (May 28, 2013)
- Saint Odd (January 13, 2015)

== Odd Passenger ==
A four-part webisode series debuting in April 2008, Odd Passenger details events between Brother Odd and Odd Hours. They were directed by Jack Paccione Jr., with Odd being played by Anthony Marks. In it, Odd encounters a fellow ghost-seer who has been driven mad by his visions of the lingering dead. This leads Odd to fear for his own sanity, and ponders whether or not he too will be driven to madness by his second sight. The series ends at the beginning of Odd Hours, with Odd witnessing a vision of the end of the world while visiting Magic Beach.

== Order of all Odd Thomas materials ==
1. Prequels (Manga graphic novels In Odd We Trust, Odd Is on Our Side, House of Odd)
2. Odd Thomas/Odd Thomas (film) (2013)
3. Forever Odd
4. Brother Odd
5. Odd Passenger (Unofficial webisodes, four parts)
6. Odd Hours
7. Odd Interlude (Novella originally published in three parts)
8. Odd Apocalypse
9. Deeply Odd
10. Saint Odd
