= Epigraph (literature) =

Short quotation or saying at the beginning of a book or chapter

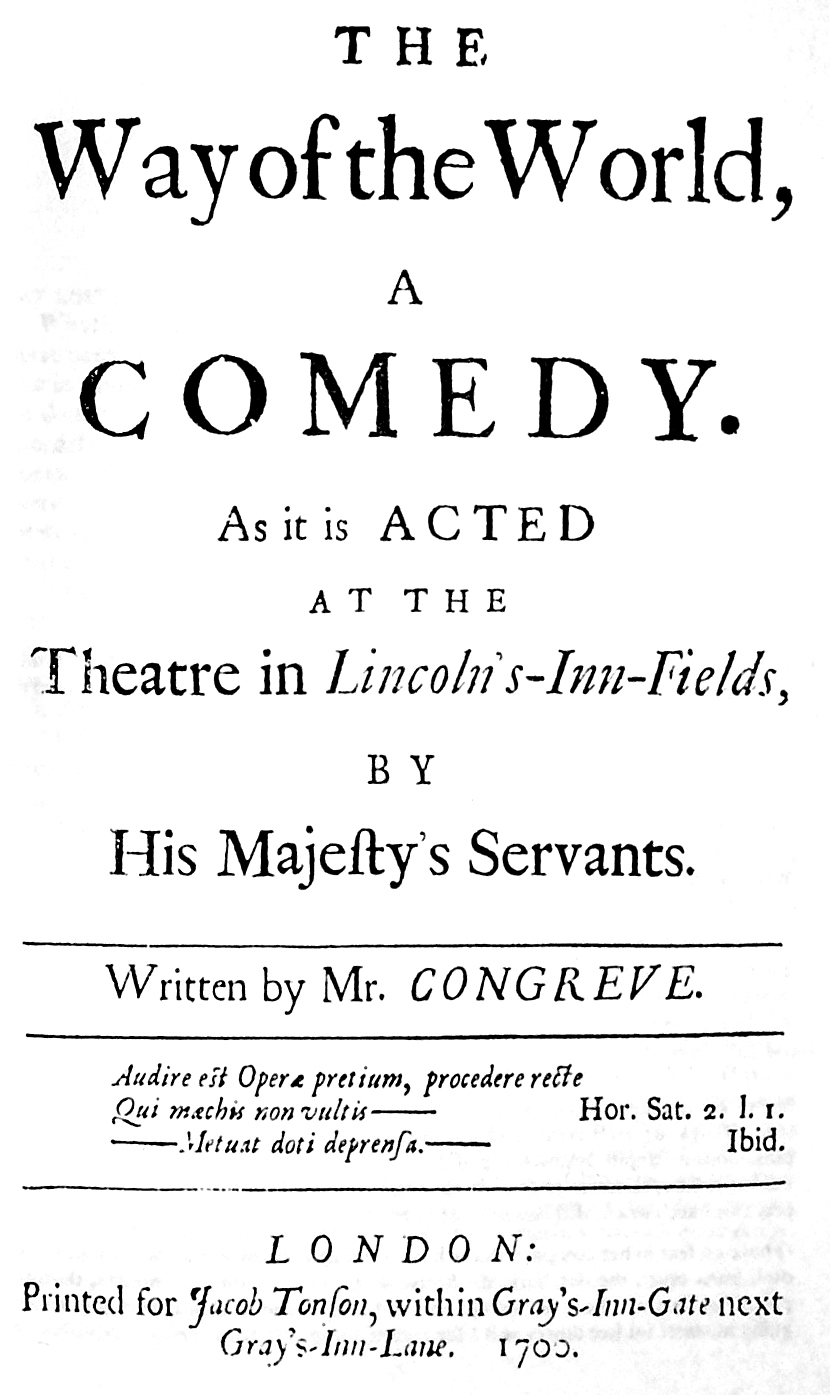
Facsimile of the original title page for William Congreve's The Way of the World published in 1700, on which the epigraph from Horace's Satires can be seen in the bottom quarter.

In literature, an epigraph is a phrase, quotation, or poem that is set at the beginning of a document, monograph or section or chapter thereof. The epigraph may serve as a preface to the work; as a summary; as a counter-example; or as a link from the work to a wider literary canon, with the purpose of either inviting comparison or enlisting a conventional context.

A book may have an overall epigraph that is part of the front matter, one for each chapter, or both.

== Examples ==
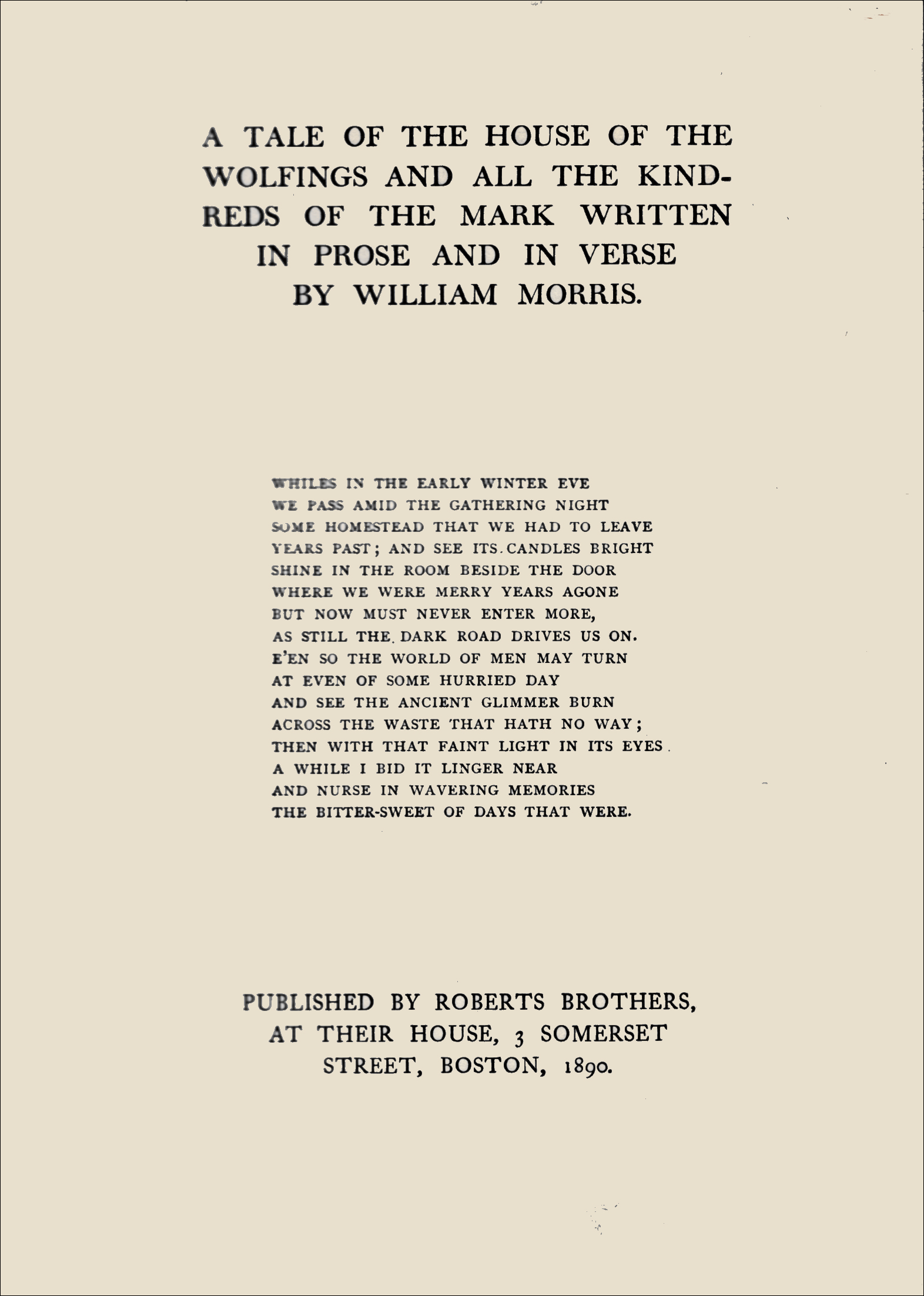
Epigraph, consisting of an excerpt from the book itself, William Morris's The House of the Wolfings

- As the epigraph to The Sum of All Fears, Tom Clancy quotes Winston Churchill in the context of thermonuclear war: "Why, you may take the most gallant sailor, the most intrepid airman or the most audacious soldier, put them at a table together – what do you get? The sum of their fears."
- The epigraph to "The Love Song of J. Alfred Prufrock" by T. S. Eliot is part of a speech by one of the damned in Dante's Inferno. It serves to cast ironic light on Prufrock's intent.
- The epigraph to E. L. Doctorow's Ragtime quotes Scott Joplin's instructions to those who play his music, "Do not play this piece fast. It is never right to play ragtime fast."
- The epigraph to Theodore Herzl's Altneuland is "If you will it, it is no dream..." which became a slogan of the Zionist movement.
- Louis Antoine de Saint-Just's line "Nobody can rule guiltlessly" appears before chapter one in Arthur Koestler's 1940 anti-totalitarian novel Darkness at Noon.
- A Samuel Johnson quotation serves as an epigraph in Hunter S. Thompson's novel Fear and Loathing in Las Vegas: "He who makes a beast of himself gets rid of the pain of being a man."
- Stephen King uses many epigraphs in his writing, usually to mark the beginning of another section in a novel. An unusual example is The Stand wherein he uses lyrics from certain songs to express the metaphor used in a particular part.
- Cormac McCarthy opens his 1985 novel Blood Meridian with three epigraphs: quotations from French writer and philosopher Paul Valéry, from German Christian mystic and Gnostic Jacob Boehme, and a 1982 news clipping from the Yuma Sun reporting the claim of members of an Ethiopian archeological excavation that a fossilized skull three hundred millennia old seemed to have been scalped.
- The epigraphs to the preamble of Georges Perec's Life: A User's Manual (La Vie mode d'emploi) and to the book as a whole warn the reader that tricks are going to be played and that all will not be what it seems.
- Quotation from Woodrow Wilson's The State on the title page of every issue of The Bohemian Review, a magazine endorsing independence of Czechs and Slovaks to Austria-Hungary in 1917–1918 (example).

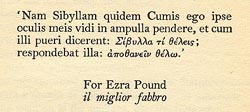
Epigraph and dedication page, The Waste Land

=== Fictional quotations ===
Some writers use as epigraphs fictional quotations that purport to be related to the fiction of the work itself. Examples include:

==== In films ====
- The film Le Samouraï opens with a fictional quotation from the Bushido.
- The film Talladega Nights: The Ballad of Ricky Bobby opens with a fictional quotation attributed to Eleanor Roosevelt for comedic effect.

==== In literature ====
- Elizabeth C. Bunce's Edgar Award-winning Myrtle Hardcastle mystery series, beginning with Premeditated Myrtle includes epigraphs by the fictional 19th century scholar H.M. Hardcastle at the beginning of each chapter of the five-book series.
- The first and last books of Diane Duane's Rihannsu series of Star Trek novels pair quotations from Lays of Ancient Rome with imagined epigraphs from Romulan literature.
- F. Scott Fitzgerald's The Great Gatsby carries on title page a poem called from its first hemistich "Then Wear the Gold Hat," purportedly signed by Thomas Parke D'Invilliers. D'Invilliers is a character in Fitzgerald's first novel, This Side of Paradise.
- Jasper Fforde's The Eyre Affair has quotations from supposedly future works about the action of the story.
- John Green's The Fault in Our Stars has a quotation from a fictitious novel, An Imperial Affliction, which features prominently as a part of the story.
- Dean Koontz's The Book of Counted Sorrows began as a fictional book of poetry from which Koontz would "quote" when no suitable existing option was available; Koontz simply wrote all these epigraphs himself. Many fans, rather than realizing the work was Koontz' own invention, apparently believed it was a real, but rare, volume; Koontz later collected the existing verse into an actual book.
- The beginning of each chapter from Watership Down by Richard Adams has an epigraph from classic literature.
- The Ring Verse at the beginning of J. R. R. Tolkien's The Lord of the Rings describes the Rings of Power, the central plot device of the novel.
- Edward Gorey's The Unstrung Harp is not only about a fictitious novel, but its author thinks of a fictional verse for its epigraph.

== See also ==
- Epigram, a brief, interesting, memorable, and sometimes surprising or satirical statement
- Incipit, the first few words of a text, employed as an identifying label
- Flavor text, applied to games and toys
- Prologue, an opening to a story that establishes context and may give background
- Keynote, the first non-specific talk on a conference spoken by an invited (and usually famous) speaker in order to sum up the main theme of the conference.

== Bibliography ==
- Ahern, Rosemary, ed. (2012). The Art of the Epigraph: How Great Books Begin. New York: Simon and Schuster. ISBN 9781451693270.
- Barth, John (1984). The Friday Book: Essays and Other Nonfiction. New York: Perigree Books. pp. xvii–xviii. ISBN 9780399512094.
- Stokes, Claudia (Summer 2018). "Novel Commonplaces: Quotation, Epigraphs, and Literary Authority". American Literary History. 30 (2): 201–221. doi:10.1093/alh/ajy005.
