= Odd Thomas (film) =

2013 American thriller film

- Theatrical release poster
- Directed by: Stephen Sommers
- Written by: Stephen Sommers
- Based on: Odd Thomas by Dean Koontz
- Produced by: John Baldecchi; Howard Kaplan; Stephen Sommers
- Starring: Anton Yelchin; Willem Dafoe; Addison Timlin; Nico Tortorella
- Cinematography: Mitchell Amundsen
- Edited by: David Checel
- Music by: John Swihart
- Production companies: Fusion Films; The Sommers Company
- Distributed by: Fusion Films; Future Films
- Release dates: April 6, 2013 (River Bend Film Festival); February 28, 2014
- Running time: 93 minutes
- Country: United States
- Language: English
- Budget: $27 million
- Box office: $1.3 million

Odd Thomas is a 2013 thriller film based on Dean Koontz's 2003 novel of the same name. It is directed, written, and co-produced by Stephen Sommers and stars Anton Yelchin as Odd Thomas, with Willem Dafoe as Wyatt Porter, and Addison Timlin as Stormy Llewellyn.

== Plot ==
Odd Thomas is a psychic who lives in a small town in California. He can see mysterious creatures he calls "bodachs" which are otherwise invisible to everyone else. He knows they feed on fear and misery, and the greater the number of "bodachs" the more misery is coming. One day at work, he sees a strange man swarming with bodachs. Because of the man's strange hair, the back of which looks like a fungal toupee, he nicknames him "Fungus man". He follows the man to his house, and learns the man is named Bob Robertson. He finds a mysterious "doorway" in Fungus Bob's house where hundreds of bodachs are entering the world. Through some investigation, Odd determines that Bob is planning to do something violent. He reports his suspicion to his friend and mentor, Chief Porter, who assigns two deputies to follow Fungus Bob.

Odd meets his girlfriend Stormy Llewellyn for dinner in the belfry of a church. He sees Fungus Bob approaching and they flee to the sacristy, which Robertson destroys as they escape. Stormy calls Chief Porter, who finds the church vandalized but no evidence to link it to Bob. Odd's psychic magnetism leads him and Stormy to a bowling alley, where the bowling shirts from his vision have just become the new uniform. Chief Porter sends Officer Simon Varner to watch the place on Odd's advice.

Odd finds Fungus Bob shot to death in his bathtub, with evidence framing him for the murder. He discovers that Bob has been dead for quite some time and deduces that the encounter at the church was with the dead man's restless spirit.

Chief Porter is shot in a home invasion. Odd rushes to the hospital and learns that Porter is alive but in serious condition. The chief is saved from death due to a medallion that Odd had given him, which deflected the bullet.

Odd investigates Bob's fatal bullet wound, and finds a tattoo matching Varner's. He realizes that Bob was eliminated by his co-conspirators because Odd had begun to look into him. His powers lead him back to the mall, where Officer Eckles has murdered the mall security staff; Odd disables him with a baseball bat. Officer Varner has started shooting in the mall, killing quite a few. Odd discovers Bob's moving van packed with explosives on a timer – apparently part of a plan to kill the shoppers in the mall and arriving first responders. He drives it away from the mall, when Varner returns and shoots him. Varner clings to the outside of the van, attempting to finish him off. Odd jumps from the van as Varner enters the cab, and the van crashes into a man-made canal and explodes, incinerating Varner but killing no one else.

Odd wakes in the hospital to find himself hailed as a local hero. Later, he retreats to Stormy's apartment to enjoy uninterrupted time with her. It is revealed that Stormy was killed in the mall shooting. Porter, realizing that Stormy's spirit is staying in this world only for Odd, advises him to let her go. He bids her a tearful farewell, promising her that they'll be reunited one day. Then Odd travels to Las Vegas to continue his crusade.

== Cast ==
- Anton Yelchin as Odd Thomas, the clairvoyant cook with supernatural powers to see the dead. He must destroy the threat to Pico Mundo. Jack Justice plays young Odd Thomas.
- Addison Timlin as Bronwyn "Stormy" Llewellyn, Odd's love interest. She knows about Odd's powers and tries to help him out any way she can. Robin Lanning plays young Stormy.
- Gugu Mbatha-Raw as Viola, a waitress at the restaurant.
- Shuler Hensley as Fungus Bob, a mysterious suspect with mold as hair.
- Leonor Varela as Odd's Mother; seen in only flashbacks who too has the gift of clairvoyance and is committed to a mental hospital by Odd's father.
- Willem Dafoe as Wyatt Porter, the town's police chief who also knows about Odd's powers and helps out Odd in many ways.
- Melissa Ordway as Lysette, a blonde teenager.
- Nico Tortorella as Simon Varner, a police officer who dislikes Odd.
- Kyle McKeever as Bern Eckles, another police officer who works for Wyatt.
- Laurel Harris as Karla Porter, Wyatt's wife.

With cameo appearances by Patton Oswalt as Ozzie, Matthew Page as Harlo Landerson, Morse Bicknel as Kevin Goss, Ashley Sommers as Penny Kalisto, and Arnold Vosloo as Tom Jedd.

== Production ==
Anton Yelchin was attached to star in the film early on. Sommers said that Yelchin was his only choice to play Odd Thomas. Early casting announcements included 50 Cent as Shamus Cocobolo as well as Lily Collins and Tim Robbins none of whom ultimately ended up appearing in the film. Production began in May 2011 in Santa Fe, New Mexico and Albuquerque.

Dean Koontz himself enjoyed the film saying "It is so wonderful that I am whacked flat by happiness."

The film wrapped in 2011 but was delayed. In July 2013, it was reported that the release of the film had been delayed because of legal action by Two Out of Ten Productions against Outsource Media Group and others for breach of contract. The suit alleges that $25 million should have been spent on prints and advertising to support a release of Odd Thomas in the U.S., and another $10 million to partially refinance certain loans.

== Reception ==
=== Critical response ===
Odd Thomas received mixed reviews from film critics. Rotten Tomatoes gives it a rating of 38% rating based on reviews from 47 critics, with an average score of 5.2/10. The site's critical consensus states: "Anton Yelchin is the right man for the title role, but Odd Thomas suffers from a jumbled tone." Metacritic gives it a score of 45 out of 100, based on reviews from 11 critics, indicating "mixed or average reviews".

Brian Tallerico for RogerEbert.com gave it one and a half stars calling it "a film that's going through the motions with too little character, style, or atmosphere to keep it engaging". Dennis Harvey for Variety said the film "is neither witty nor macabre enough to pull off Koontz's balance of elements in cinematic terms. So it winds up coming off as just another CGI-laden ride that's at once overstuffed and undernourished." John DeFore of The Hollywood Reporter found the script felt rushed and while the cast was enjoyable "Odd Thomas just doesn't leave us with much desire to return there".

Drew Taylor for IndieWire gave the film a B and called it "the best Koontz adaptation, by a fairly considerable margin".

=== Box office ===
The movie was a box office bomb. It began its theatrical roll-out in the Philippines on July 17, 2013. It debuted at #6 taking in $52,623 from 35 screens. The film ended its two-week run with $118,835. The film opened in Finland where it took in $6,309 from 31 screens for a 14th-place finish. The film grossed a total of $1,321,097 at the international box office.

After having been delayed due to legal disputes, the film had a limited theatrical release in the United States, in February 2014. No domestic box office figures were reported.

== Home media ==
The film was released on DVD in the UK in February 2014. A German dubbed version was released in December 2013.

It was released on DVD and Blu-ray in the United States on March 25, 2014. It has grossed a total of $3.2 million in DVD and Blu-ray sales in the United States, As of January 2021.
