= Eachtra Bhodaigh an Chóta Lachtna =

Irish myth

Eachtra Bhodaigh an Chóta Lachtna ("Adventure of the Churl of the Grey Coat"; "Tale of the Carle in the Drab Coat") is the title of an Early Modern Irish (16th or 17th century, Egerton MS 154) Fenian tale.

The bodach is a trickster figure, consort or male analogue of the cailleach ("hag"), already known from Old Irish sources, but this early modern tale is the only source of his identification with Manannán.

In the tale the Fianna is challenged to foot-race by one "Ironbones, son of the king of Thessaly. The race is to be from Benn Étair to Munster. Caílte mac Rónáin, the best runner of the Fianna, is away at Tara. As Fionn mac Cumhaill goes to look for Caílte, he encounters a repulsive giant, the titular bodach, who agrees to run the race on the Fianna's behalf. As the race begins, the bodach seems to perform very badly, getting up late in the day, long after the challenger has already left. He then turns out to be an extremely swift runner, overtaking Ironbones twice, but he then stops to eat blackberries, or even backtracks after losing his coat. He still wins the race easily, and is later revealed to have been Manannán mac Lir in disguise.

James Clarence Mangan in 1840 adapted the tale as one of the first prose works of the Irish literary renaissance. O'Grady (1892) edited the Irish text with an English translation. Pádraic Pearse published a retelling in modern Irish in 1906. Two Manx versions of the tale, with the title Boddagh Yn Cooat Laaghagh, were written by Edward Faragher.

== See also ==
- The Tortoise and the Hare
