= The Positive Quotations Series =

Inspirational book series 1993-present

The Positive Quotations line is an inspirational book series published by Fairview Press. Books in the series have topped the best-seller lists for self-help, juvenile nonfiction and reference books.

== History ==
1993-1996

Rubicon Press published The Rubicon Dictionary of Positive, Motivational, Life-Affirming, and Inspirational Quotations, compiled and arranged by John Cook, in 1993.

1997-2001

Fairview Press acquired all rights to the Rubicon edition, republishing the work in hardcover in 1996 as The Fairview Guide to Positive Quotations. The book was republished in paperback in 2007 under the title The Book of Positive Quotations, which immediately gained favor with reference bookbuyers and research librarians. The Book of Positive Quotations eventually climbed to #2 on the U.S. reference charts. Fairview Press also released six break-out editions of the book in 1997 under the trademark Pocket Positives(TM). In 1999, Fairview Press sold hardcover rights to The Book of Positive Quotations to Gramercy Press, an imprint of Random House Value Publishing.

2002-2007

Following the death of compiler John Cook in 2001, Steve Deger and Leslie Ann Gibson took over as series editors, creating The Women's Book of Positive Quotations (2002, now out-of-print), The Little Book of Positive Quotations (2006) and a revised and expanded The Book of Positive Quotations, 2nd Edition (2007), which included 3,000 new quotations. Fairview Press also acquired the rights to Pat Corrick Hinton's book, Time to Become Myself, and re-released it in 2007 as part of the series under the title The Book of Positive Quotations for Our Golden Years.

2008–Present

Competition from online sources---coupled with economic contraction within the retail trade book market---led Fairview Press to format select volumes as value-priced gift editions for discount retailers and nontraditional retail book outlets. Releases from this period included The Daily Book of Positive Quotations (2008) by Linda Picone; The Nightly Book of Positive Quotations (2009) by Steve Deger; The Girl's Book of Positive Quotations (2008) by Steve Deger and Leslie Ann Gibson; The Boy's Book of Positive Quotations (2009) by Steve Deger, with illustrations by Queenie Chan (2009); and The Little Book of Positive Quotations, 2nd Edition (2009) by Steve Deger and Leslie Ann Gibson.

== Books ==
- The Book of Positive Quotations, 2nd Ed.
- The Little Book of Positive Quotations
- The Girl's Book of Positive Quotations
- The Boy's Book of Positive Quotations
- The Nightly Book of Positive Quotations
- The Daily Book of Positive Quotations
- The Book of Positive Quotations for Our Golden Years
- 100 Quotes That Will Change Your life.
