= Slim Goodbody =

Fictional character created by John Burstein

Slim Goodbody ("the Superhero of Health", also known as Mr. Goodbody) is a recurring character created and performed by John Burstein. Burstein created the character in 1975. He performs wearing a sometimes white, sometimes peach colored unitard with various tissues, organs and organ systems painted in biologically-accurate locations and sizes. Each costume costs $4,000.

== John Burstein ==
Burstein was born on December 25, 1949, in Mineola, New York, and grew up in Lawrence, Nassau County, New York. While working at The Floating Hospital in New York City he began writing songs and skits to entertain the children there and to teach them about anatomy and the workings of the human body. He eventually added an organ-painted body suit to the design, dubbing his alter-ego "Slim Goodbody".

Burstein lives with his wife, Chrissy, in a lakeside home in Lincolnville, Maine. They have two sons, Devin and Luke.

Burstein's sister, Karen Burstein, is a former New York state senator and judge.

== Career ==
Burstein soon took his character outside the hospital. In his earliest days, he mainly did personal appearances and guest spots on shows such as The Today Show and Good Morning America. His skits also focused on exercise, personal hygiene, and nutrition. Between 1976 and 1981, he appeared twice a week on the CBS series Captain Kangaroo.

Slim Goodbody eventually received his own television series in 1980, Inside Story, on PBS. The program mainly consisted of Burstein's live-show Slim Goodbody sketches, though other children's show celebrities such as Captain Kangaroo would sometimes make guest appearances. The show soon became the station's second-highest rated program, and Burstein landed roles on other stations, including Nickelodeon. Since then, Slim Goodbody has featured in several other series, as well. At one point, Slim Goodbody began making educational shorts on such subjects as the fear of visiting a hospital, amongst others. One of these shorts featured Burstein's son, Devin, as a child learning about hospitals as he overcomes his fears of an upcoming operation.

Beginning in 1982, the character has also appeared in books published by McGraw-Hill, Putnam, and Fairview Press. A series of educational shorts featuring Burstein's character were produced in 1985. Titled, Well, Well, Well! with Slim Goodbody, these were aimed for school children grades K-4.

In 2014, Slim Goodbody appeared in a Radio Shack commercial advertisement during Super Bowl XLVIII.

Over the years, Slim Goodbody has also addressed child obesity, bullying, personal safety, self-esteem, literacy and environmentalism.

As of 2005, Burstein tours the United States and Canada dressed as Slim Goodbody and performing in Bodyology. School-based shows, performed by other actors, include Musical Health Show and Lighten Up!

Burstein and his Goodbody programs have won numerous awards including the Parents' Choice Award and the Healthy American Fitness Leader Award.

== Publications ==
Burstein has written a number of small, informational children's books (as Slim Goodbody) including:

- Slim Goodbody, the Inside Story ISBN 0070092400
- The Mind (Wonderful you) ISBN 1577490207
- The Astounding Nervous System: How Does My Brain Work? ISBN 0778744280
- Can We Get Along?: Dealing With Differences (2009) ISBN 0778747883

== Records ==
- 1974 The Inside Story, re-released in 1981 on Caedmon Records

== Television appearances ==
- Captain Kangaroo (1976–1980)
- The Adventures of Slim Goodbody in Nutri-City (1978)
- The Inside Story with Slim Goodbody (1980)
- Slim Goodbody's "Top 40 Health Hits" (1981–1982)
- Body Builders (1985)
- Well, Well, Well! with Slim Goodbody (1985)
- All Fit with Slim Goodbody (1987)
- The Outside Story with Slim Goodbody (1991)
- The Before Tour (1991)
- Step-By-Step (1994)
- Slim Goodbody's PSA National Dairy Board (1994)
- Get Ready to Read (1995)
- Music City Tonight, 1 episode (1995)
- Gun Safety (1998)
- Goodbodies (1999)
- Math Monsters (2000)
- U.S. That's Us! (2001)
- I'm Safe on Wheels (2002)
- Life Skills 101 (2003)
- X-Power (2003)
- Daily Deskercise (2006)
- Daily Almanac (2007)
- Health Tips (2008)
- Oddities, as customer (2013)
- RadioShack: "The '80s Called" (2014)
- Kids Guide To COVID-19 (2020)
