= The Dreaming (Tokyopop comic) =

Original English-language manga

- Cover, The Dreaming volume 1
- Genre: Horror
- Author: Queenie Chan
- Publisher: (Australia) (New Zealand) Madman Entertainment (Canada) (United States) Tokyopop
- Other publishers: (Russia) Comix-art
- Original run: 2005–2007
- Volumes: 3

The Dreaming is an original English-language manga series created by artist/author Queenie Chan and published by Tokyopop. It is one of the first manga put out by the company that were not made in Japan.

Jeanie and Amber Malkin - identical twin sisters - are new students at the 100-year-old Greenwich Private College, a boarding school in North Sydney, Australia that lies on the edge of vast, virgin bushlands. After settling in and meeting new friends, the girls learn an unsettling secret: time and time again over the past century, students have wandered off into the wilderness surrounding the school and vanished without a trace, never to return. They both begin to have strange dreams and are scared of the school. Jeanie and Amber begin to discover the mystery behind the disappearances and also the reason why the college's creepy vice-principal carries such a prejudice against identical twins.

== Characters ==
=== Students ===
Amber Malkin
She is the serious-minded twin, and is the first of the twins to feel the supernatural presence at Greenwich. Amber is shy, and as such feels a little left out when next to her more exuberant twin. She is close to her sister, but will not always tell her what is on her mind. Amber has frequent dreams of a mysterious and menacing gathering in a forest and in the school itself. As the manga progresses Amber is drawn more under the control of the supernatural presence and spends most of her time asleep.
In book three it was revealed that Amber was hit by a car yet miraculously survived. While with Jeanie in the art gallery she became possessed by Mary Spector.

Jeanie Malkin
Jeanie is the more outgoing of the two, and makes friends easily. She sometimes will accidentally leave her quieter sister out in her drive to be accepted. Jeanie is very loyal to Amber, however. Jeanie can be a rebel at times, and as such will not always make the right choices. After leaving Greenwich she becomes a paralegal secretary.

Millie
Millie is a student at Greenwich Private College. She is one of the more knowledgeable people about the mysteries that surround the bushland area, since her mother, grandmother, and great-grandmother have all gone to Greenwich when they were younger. Peppy and popular, she is quick to invite the two sisters into her social group. However, she is pronounced "missing" in the first novel. Eventually, Jeanie finds her dead body floating in a pool of water. In the short story featured in the three book collection, it's revealed that Millie comes from a family of witches that are bent on finding the secret to eternal youth and immortality and is believed to be related to Peggy Sue, the girl who escaped Greenwich Private college in the 1920s when Beatrice and Mary Spector arrived on a horse and carriage.

Schala
She is one of the fellow students at the school. Schala is daring, and thinks nothing of sneaking out of her room late at night to go to a party in one of the other dorm rooms. She can lose her patience somewhat easily, as she was quick to scold Amber when she refused to cooperate in a group seance. Schala has some knowledge of the stories surrounding the college, but it is very limited. She is very good at leading, and was able to get herself and her friends on a search team when one of the fellow students goes missing, but she leaves once Jeanie finds Millie dead and accuses Jeanie and Amber for the reason of Millie's death.

Trevor
A friend of Millie's and the rest of the group. He is very interested in artwork throughout the campus, although it is just all a lie; he thinks it will attract people, mainly girls. He also seem to be interested in Jeanie, though she doesn't seem to be as interested in him.

Gabrielle
Millie and Schala's friend. She asked Jeanie to do a mirror dare and say "Mary Spector" five times and then nothing happened. Millie tried it and something cracked. She was tired and went back to sleep. She is also nosy.

=== Staff ===
Mrs. Skeener
She is the vice-principal of Greenwich Private College, and refuses to let twins into the school under any circumstances. Her reasons for this are as yet unknown, as she is very secretive about them. She is very strict, and is quick to scold any students that she thinks is acting improperly. Mrs. Skeener has a mysterious back room in her office, which contains an antique dress, picture of two twins and an ax. Speculation exists between some of the students that these twins are related somehow to Mrs. Skeener.

Catherine Anu
She is one of the younger teachers at the college, and is very strict. She comes across the girls sneaking out of their dorm room one night. She is the one that sends the twins to the office, causing them to discover Mrs. Skeener's back room. Her past is somewhat vague. Jeanie finds out that the teacher's friend also disappeared into the brush. She helps Jeanie with the missing girls mystery.

Jessie Malkin
Jessie is the aunt of Amber and Jeanie, as well as the head-mistress of the college. She was very insistent on the twins attending the school, even going as far as to fake the twins' birthdates. As soon as the twins arrive, she goes on a trip for three months for an educational summit as well as to bury her father-in-law. She is aware of the stories circulating through the college, but it is so far unknown if she brought the twins to the school purposely because of the stories.

=== Others ===
Avril Merriweather
The school's first headmistress and its founder, back when it was a finishing school for young ladies during the 1920s, and Mrs. Skeener's aunt. Avril was formerly a governess in England, known for her cruel techniques for disciplining her charges. One such example, of locking them in wardrobes, resulted in a girl going mad and biting off her tongue. Her reputation ruined, Avril bought a patch of land in the Australian bush, away from prying eyes, and founded her school. She continued her sadistic teachings, such as locking misbehaving students inside of a coffin that had air holes covered by black velvet. One such girl who suffered the most was an orphan, tormented by both Avril and the eleven other girls who made up the class. The girl, known by the others as "She", escaped into the bush and vanished. Some time after, Avril disappeared, the first to do so before the girls would be taken.

Mary Spector
Mrs. Skeener's twin sister and an art prodigy. Mary was one of the twelve girls who disappeared when the school first opened, and it is her paintings which decorate the school's halls.

Anne Galloway
A student who went to school with Catherine Anu, her roommate and best friend. Anne was one of the many girls who disappeared at the school over the years and is believed to become a Quinkan herself via having her soul eaten/collected.

"She"
An orphan girl whose name was never revealed, she was one of the twelve girls who made up the first class of Greenwich Private College, back when it was Merriweather's Finishing School for Young Ladies during the 1920s. "She" suffered the most at the hands of Avril Merriweather, having her hair cut off and regularly being locked inside the coffin Avril used for punishment. One day, "She" ran into the bush surrounding the school, where it is believed she came across a quinkan, an Australian spirit of the Dreaming who was also the "Fairy King", and sold her soul in return for revenge. "She" began luring her tormentors back into the bush and ate their souls, turning them into quinkan just as she had been.

Eileen
A student at Greenwich Private College in its first incarnation and talked to Beatrice when she, along with Mary, arrived at Greenwich Private College but disappeared a day later due to falling asleep and sleepwalking into the bush.

== Release ==
The series is also licensed in Russia by Comix-art.

=== Volume list ===
No.	Release date	ISBN
1	December 13, 2005	978-1-59816-382-7
01. "A New School"; 02. "The Door"; 03. "The Dreaming"; 04. "The Mirror"; 05. "The Vice-Principal"; 06. "Circle"; 07. "Reflection"
When twin sisters Amber and Jeanie are accepted into an exclusive Australian boarding school, their future looks bright. But the school's halls harbor a terrible secret: students have been known to wander into the surrounding bushlands and vanish...without a trace! No one knows where they went--or why. But as Amber and Jeanie are about to learn, the key to the school's dark past may lie in the world of their dreams...
2	November 7, 2006	978-1-59816-383-4
08. "Remembrance"; 09. "History of the School"; 10. "Eleven Years Ago"; 11. "That Which Is Not Dead"; 12. "Echoes of Dreams"; 13. "What Miss Anu Knows"; 14. "Lost and Discovered"
Greenwich Private College grinds to a complete halt after the discovery of Millie's body. As gloom and despair sets in, most of the students leave the school. But Jeanie's curiosity keeps her on campus, and when she's led down the path of Greenwich's dark history, has she awakened a ghostly curse?
3	December 11, 2007	978-1-59816-384-1
15. "The Fairy King"; 16. "The Sealed Room Revisited"; 17. "The Paintings"; 18. "The Art Gallery"; 19. "The Past (1)"; 20. "The Past (2)"; 21. "Epilogue"
Where did the ghostly girls come from? And what do they want? Before the students know it, the missing girls enter the school, where Amber spots Millie, who speaks to her almost as if to warn her of something. Is there more to this supernatural mystery than just the school itself? The answers to why these girls have come back and what caused their death are revealed in this haunting series finale.

== Trivia ==
- The initial plotline of this series (students going missing in the Australian wilderness) is very similar to A Picnic At Hanging Rock, however the author states that her inspiration comes from a friend who disappeared in the Tasmanian wilderness. Her friend's gear was discovered, but there was no trace of what happened to her.
- The characters of the twins Jeanie and Amber actually come from Queenie-Chan's short story 'Twins', and they both appeared in a romantic comedy called 'Twinside', Queenie Chan's first pitch to TokyoPop. While the initial pitch was rejected, the first chapter can be read on her website ('Twins' is also available in the website as well).
- In the first printing of volume 1, there was a bonus insert of the twins as paperdolls with period clothing. It is not available in later printings, but is still available for download on the author's website.
- As of fall 2006 the first volume is in its 3rd printing, making it one of the best selling titles of TokyoPop's American made manga.
- Mrs Skeener's given name "Beatrice Bow" is a reference to the novel Playing Beatie Bow.
- As of 2023, the comic series was revised and reprinted with updated art, slight modifications to clarify the plot, a side story and new epilogue. A sequel is currently in the works. The new epilogue is to act as a bridge between volume three and the sequel series,
