= The '80s Called =

Television advertisement

- Agency: GSD&M
- Client: RadioShack
- Language: English
- Running time: 30 seconds
- Product: RadioShack
- Release date: February 2, 2014
- Directed by: Frank Todaro
- Music by: "Working for the Weekend" by Loverboy
- Starring: Mark Saul
- Country: United States

"The '80s Called" is a television advertisement produced by GSD&M for RadioShack, which debuted during Super Bowl XLVIII on February 2, 2014.

== Plot ==
A RadioShack store clerk (Mark Saul) receives a call and informs his coworker that "The '80s called. They want their store back." Seconds later, several 1980s pop culture icons raid the store and clear the inventory while Loverboy's "Working for the Weekend" plays in the background. The icons then load their loot on a DeLorean and leave the empty store.

== Featured pop culture icons ==
- ALF
- Bubo
- The California Raisins
- Chucky
- Cliff Clavin (John Ratzenberger)
- Devo
- Slim Goodbody
- Hulk Hogan
- Kid 'n Play
- Frank "Ponch" Poncherello (Erik Estrada)
- Q*bert
- Mary Lou Retton
- Sgt. Slaughter
- Slimer
- Dee Snider
- Teen Wolf
- Jason Voorhees
