= In Odd We Trust =

2008 graphic novel written by Queenie Chan and Dean Koontz

- Author: Dean Koontz, Queenie Chan
- Illustrator: Queenie Chan
- Language: English
- Genre: Thriller, Mystery
- Publisher: Del Rey Books
- Publication date: June 24, 2008
- Publication place: United States
- Media type: Manga
- ISBN: 978-0-345-49966-0
- OCLC: 178280286
- Dewey Decimal: 741.5/973 22
- LC Class: PN6790.A83 C55 2008
- Followed by: Odd Is On Our Side

In Odd We Trust is the first graphic novel featuring Dean Koontz's character Odd Thomas. It was released June 24, 2008 by Del Rey Books. It is written by Queenie Chan and Koontz, with illustrations by Chan in a manga style.

== Plot summary ==
In Odd We Trust serves as a prequel to the first Odd Thomas novel. The ghost of a young boy appears to Odd, and he embarks on a quest to bring justice to the boy's killer so that his ghost can move on. Odd's friend, the Chief of Police Wyatt Porter, shares some details of the case, and informs him that the boy's babysitter is the one that discovered the body. The babysitter turns out to be Sherry Sheldon, a childhood friend of Odd's girlfriend and soulmate, Stormy Llewellyn. Sherry relates that a stalker has been leaving her disturbing notes for several months, and believes this stalker may be the murderer. Odd and Stormy resolve to catch the stalker before he kills again.

Odd asks the ghost of the little boy to help him find his killer, and Joey leads him to a street corner, where he sees a suspicious man. The man flees when Odd tries to address him. Odd gives chase, but loses his quarry when he trips over a lawn gnome.

Four neighborhood children are believed to be targets, as they have each received a note from the killer. Chief Porter assigns police escorts to each of the houses, and Odd and Stormy decide to spend the night with Sherry at the house where she is babysitting a girl named Angelica. The policeman on stakeout at the house finds an empty car containing a mutilated mannequin, and from this Odd deduces that the killer is nearby, taunting them. He throws open the doors of a nearby van, and discovers the man he chased earlier. He and Odd trade veiled threats, but when Stormy shows up with a gun, the man drives off.

Chief Porter traces the van's license plates to a man named Kyle Bernshaw, and gives Odd the resulting address. Odd and Stormy break into Bernshaw's house, to find giant piles of magazines (from which his mysterious notes have been cut and glued together), and a note to Odd, revealing that this was a trap. Odd turns to find himself cornered by a vicious dog, from which he is saved at the last minute by Joey's ghost. Odd and Stormy race back to the house where they left Sherry, only to find out that Angelica's parents have fired her and she has left. Odd realizes that Sherry, not one of the four children under police protection, was the target all along. The two borrow a car and, using Odd's psychic magnetism (an ability that draws him to a person if he concentrates on them while traveling), they locate Bernshaw in an abandoned slaughterhouse. Odd fights him, with limited success, until Stormy shoots him in the leg, and Odd is able to subdue him. They free Sherry from the trunk of Bernshaw's car.

The killer is taken into custody, but refuses to confess, insisting that he will be given a chance to escape, as he has made a deal with the devil and everything he wants always comes to him. He threatens to reveal Odd's identity and abilities to the world, bringing a storm of media attention, one of the very things Odd fears most. Odd lies and pretends that he, too, has sold his soul to the devil for his powers, but just as he begins to make headway with taking Bernshaw into his confidence, a guard collapses and the killer is able to grab the guard's gun. He fires, but the bullet ricochets off a chair Odd is holding. The bullet kills Bernshaw.

Angelica's parents re-hire Sherry, and the story ends with Odd and Stormy musing on the happy ending they have managed.
