= Celtic folklore =

Celtic folklore may refer to:

The Folklore in the modern Celtic nations:

- Hebridean mythology and folklore
- Irish folklore
- Scottish folklore
- Welsh folklore

Or the mythologies of ancient and modern Celtic peoples:

- Celtic mythology
- Irish mythology
- Welsh mythology

== See also ==
- Gaelic folklore (disambiguation)
