= Natalia O'Shea =

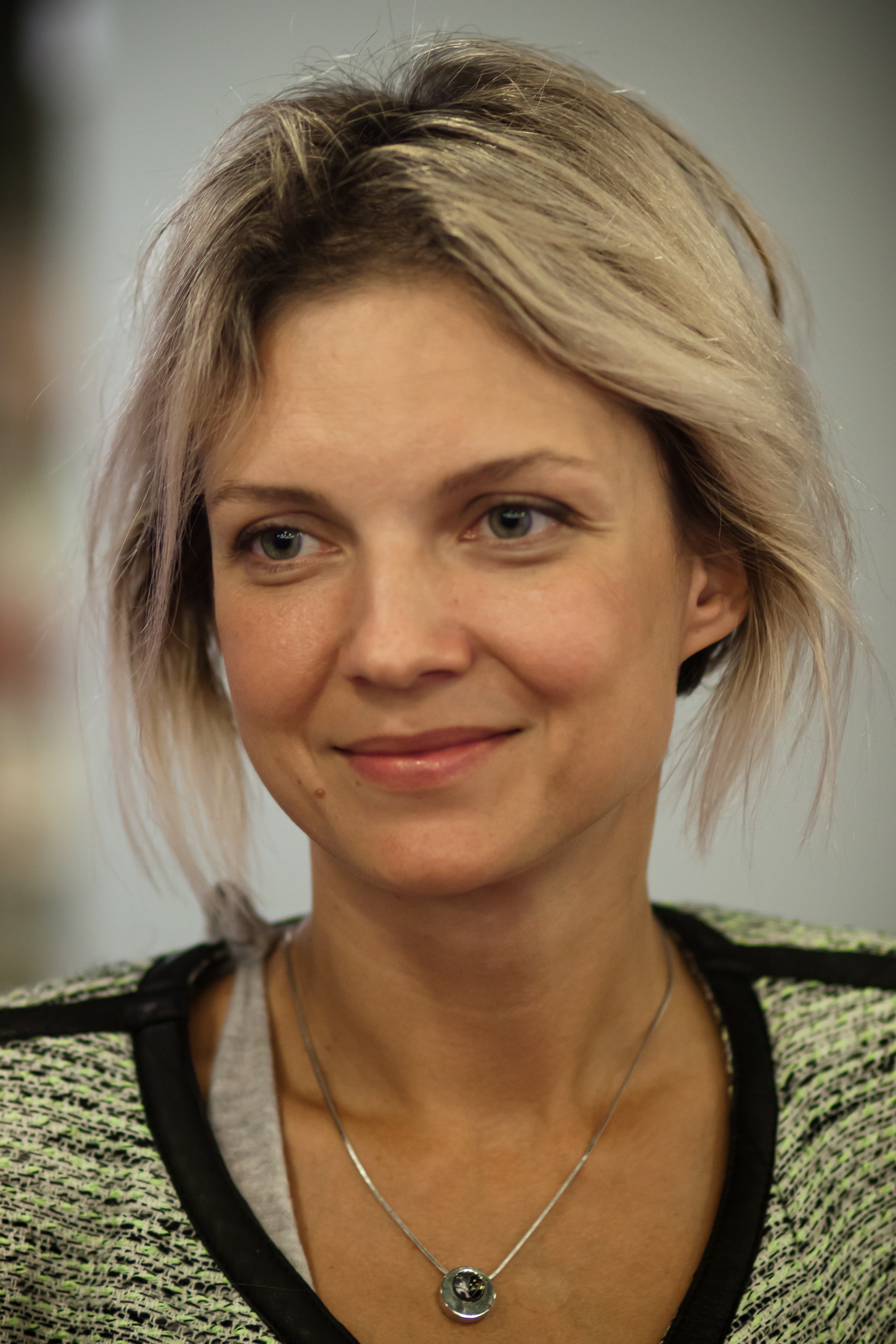

Background information
- Also known as: Hellawes
- Born: 3 September 1976 (age 49); Moscow, Soviet Union
- Genres: Folk-rock, folk, celtic
- Occupations: Linguist, songwriter, singer, harpist
- Instruments: Vocals, Celtic harp, harp, guitar
- Years active: 1998–
- Website: helavisa.ru

Natalia Andreyevna O'Shea (Note: Russian: Ната́лья Андре́евна О’Шей, romanized: Natalya Andreyevna O'Shey, IPA: [nɐˈtalʲɪ̯ə ɐnˈdrʲe(ɪ̯)ɪvnə ɐ’ʂɨɪ̯], the BGN/PCGN transliteration of Russian is used for her name here).) née Nikolayeva (Note: Russian: Никола́ева, romanized: Nikolayeva, IPA: [nʲɪkɐˈɫa(ɪ̯)ɪvə].), known as Hellawes (Note: Russian: Хелави́са, romanized: Khelavisa, IPA: [xʲɪɫɐˈvʲisə].); born 3 September 1976) is a Russian Celtic harpist, singer-songwriter, linguist, lead singer and leader of Melnitsa (folk-rock), Clann Lir (traditional Celtic folk) and Romanesque (folk). Earlier she took part in the Till Eulenspiegel project (folk), for which she was a vocalist, author and co-author of many songs.

== Biography ==
Natalia is a linguist and an expert in Indo-European languages, particularly Celtic languages. She holds a PhD in philology and is a former lecturer at Lomonosov Moscow State University. Previously, she held the position of lecturer at Trinity College Dublin, Ireland.

Since 2004, Natalia O'Shea has been living and working in Ireland (in Dublin) and Switzerland (in Geneva), although she periodically returns to Russia to participate in concerts by Melnitsa, Clann Lir, or other solo projects with previous band members.

Natalia has been performing on stage since 1998. She is affiliated with the Russian folk-rock music scene and has performed in cities such as Moscow and St. Petersburg.

=== Personal life ===
Since August 21, 2004, Natalia has been married to James Cornelius O’Shea, who at the time was a member of the staff at the Irish Embassy in Moscow. They have two daughters.

== Discography ==
=== Hellawes ===
- Running to Paradise (Melanar, 1996)
- Дорога сна (The Road of Dream) 1996
- Лунный день (The Lunar Day) (Melanar, 1996)
- Сольные записи (The Solo Album) 1999
- Леопард в городе (Leopard in the City) (2009)
- Новые ботинки (The New Boots) (2013)

=== Melnitsa ===
- Дорога сна (The Road Of Dream) (2003)
- Master of the Mill (2004)
- Перевал (Mountain Pass) (2005)
- Зов крови (Call of the Blood) (2006)
- The Best (2007)
- Дикие травы (Herbs) (2009)
- Ангелофрения (Angelophrenia) (2012)
- Алхимия (Alchemy) (2015)
- Химера (Chimera) (2016)
- 2.0 (2019)
- Манускрипт (Manuscript) (2021)
- Символ Солнца (Sun Symbol) (2023)
