= The Good Guy =

2007 novel by Dean Koontz

- Author: Dean Koontz
- Language: English
- Genre: Thriller, mystery
- Publisher: Bantam Books
- Publication date: May 29, 2007
- Publication place: United States
- Media type: Print (hardback)
- Pages: 386 pp (first edition, hardback)
- ISBN: 0-553-80481-2 (first edition, hardback)
- OCLC: 85851607
- Dewey Decimal: 813/.54 22
- LC Class: PS3561.O55 G66 2007

The Good Guy is a thriller novel by American author Dean Koontz, which was released on May 29, 2007.

== Summary ==
Timothy Carrier is an unassuming stonemason who, while having a beer at his regular bar, is accidentally mistaken for a hitman by a stranger who hands him an envelope containing $10,000 and a photo of the intended victim, a writer named Linda Paquette. The real killer arrives soon afterwards, and Tim manages to bluff him by pretending to be the client, saying he's had second thoughts, and is cancelling the hit while giving the killer the $10,000 as a "no-kill fee".

Tim covertly follows the killer outside, and is shocked when the killer places a roof-mounted police light on top of his car before driving off; implying the hitman is a cop. Tim tracks down Linda and flees. He phones his old buddy Pete, who's a homicide detective, and asks him to trace the plates of the killer's car. Tim and Linda barely manage to stay one step ahead of the killer, and they begin to suspect that he has almost unlimited access to cell phones, financial transactions and GPS tracking; implying that he is working for someone very powerful. As Tim manages to foil the killer again and again, Linda begins to suspect that Tim is more than just a mason.

The supremely confident/psychotic killer isn't deterred, but appears to become increasingly unstable as the chase continues. Over time, Tim and Linda develop feelings for one another. Linda confesses to Tim about her haunting childhood; her parents, former preschool teachers, were unjustly accused of committing horrific sexual crimes against their students, including their daughter. Linda was separated from her parents, as both of them had to go to jail and eventually die.

The killer finally tires of chasing Tim, and instead goes to Tim's house and kidnaps Tim's mom, and then calls Tim to set up a trade for Linda. During the call Tim's mom covertly lets Tim know they're still at her house (the hitman implied they were far away). Tim and Pete rush home to save Tim's mom and kill the hitman. FBI agents raid the house and begin to clean up the mess. However, before they enter the house, Tim and Pete see them coming, and being suspicious, Tim calls his neighbor across the street and asks him to covertly videotape the agents.

As the clean up proceeds the lead agent reveals that the hitman had actually been working for an American politician who's part of a shadowy conspiracy to take over the American government from the inside. Two and a half years earlier, an aide of that politician had lunch with a member of a terrorist organization. In that restaurant, the owner snapped several pictures of his regular customers, catching the aide and terrorist in the background. Later on, the terrorist was recognized as member of a terrorist organization, while the politician became popular and was being talked about as the next president, plus the pictures surfaced on the restaurant's website. Fearful that this relationship with a known terrorist organization would become known, the conspiracy, in the spirit of thoroughness, sent the hitman to kill the customers who were in the pictures; Linda Paquette being one of them. Before leaving, the lead agent politely apologizes for causing so much trouble, but makes it clear to Tim that if any of them ever say anything about what happened, Tim and everyone he loved would be killed, and it would be made to look like a murder/suicide because of Tim suffering from PTSD. Moments later, Pete shows Linda the story about Tim winning the Medal of Honor for saving numerous civilians during his experiences as a Marine.

Tim takes the video to the current American president and explains what he knows about the shadowy group of government insiders. The story ends with Tim and Linda marrying and the conspiracy falling apart; there are multiple arrests and suicides.

== Release details ==
- Koontz, Dean (May 30, 2007). The Good Guy. USA: Bantam. ISBN 978-0-553-80481-2.
