= The Taking (novel) =

2004 novel by Dean Koontz

- Cover of The Taking
- Author: Dean Koontz
- Language: English
- Genre: Science fiction, Suspense, Mystery, Horror novel
- Publisher: Bantam Books
- Publication date: 2004
- Publication place: United States
- Media type: Print (Paperback)
- Pages: 448 pp
- ISBN: 0-553-58450-2
- OCLC: 59552430

The Taking is a 2004 horror novel written by Dean Koontz.

== Plot summary ==
In the midst of an oddly sudden rain storm, author Molly Sloan awakens in the middle of the night. Unable to return to sleep, she leaves her husband Neil slumbering in bed and goes downstairs to work on a manuscript in progress.

Dark shapes huddle on her porch – coyotes from the nearby forest. She wonders what could have frightened such animals into leaving the sanctuary of the deep woods to brave the proximity of human beings. Disturbed, she steps outside, to stand among the wild beasts, and is frightened herself – not by the animals, but by the strange, oddly luminescent rain. On an instinctual level, she realizes that there is something unclean about the rain.

Once she comes back to the house, Molly and Neil search for information in the news. They are only able to gather that the same phenomenon is taking place all over the world, before all communications are lost. They decide to flee their isolated home, gathering with the residents of the nearby small mountain town, in order to prepare a resistance, though they are not even sure against what they will be fighting. After 10 hours of downpour, the rain stops. In its place, a thick, ominous fog obscures everything, reducing trees and buildings to looming shadows. By then, Molly and Neil are in the town's tavern, where around 60 people have gathered with pets and children. It is implied that the phenomenon is the product of an alien invasion.

Unfamiliar noises are heard and strange lights are seen. Peculiar fungi appear in the restroom of a local tavern, and a frightening fungus grows upon trees, lawns, houses, and people alike. From time to time, huge objects drift above the terrified populace, and people feel as if they are known, completely, by whatever or whoever occupies these aerial craft – if the silent, drifting objects are crafts of some kind.

Molly and Neil, accompanying a stray dog named Virgil, set off on a mission to rescue the town’s children, many of whom are trapped in their homes. Meanwhile, the people at the tavern, split into warring factions, struggle against the mysterious threat that has seized their town. Oddly, Virgil seems to be able to supernaturally sense when and where certain children are endangered. It is revealed, later, that other animals are also leading rescue efforts to save other children.

As they search for answers, the townspeople conclude that they are under siege by extraterrestrial invaders who have come as an advance party to reverse-terraform the Earth so that its altered atmosphere will support their alien physiological needs. In doing so, however, they will poison the planet for its human residents, who must die so that the invaders may live. At all times, while they encounter the most horrible and twisted creatures during their journey, Molly senses that the invaders are of the most malignant kind, and that they want nothing but destruction.

After going through different horrors, Molly and Neil are able to save 13 children total, with the help of Virgil and other animals. Molly is convinced that the aliens have allowed them to rescue the children to harvest them for some more terrible end; however, a chain of events leads her to believe that there is still hope, and that the children have been spared for a special reason. After 36 hours of rain, mist, and darkness, a new rain comes, but to the delight of the characters, the new rain is clean, and washes all the monsters, fungus, and diseased alien presences in the world.

At least a year later, Molly, Neil, and eight of the children they rescued are living together in a house. Society has begun a slow path towards reconstruction; most of the survivors are the children, and those who rescued them, plus dogs and cats that helped in the rescues. Molly is now a teacher, and Neil has gone back to work in the church. Most people do not talk about what happened, and the reasons behind the departure of the aliens are never discussed.

However, while the identity or the origin of the invaders is never explicitly explained, at the end of the book, Molly realizes that the invaders were not aliens at all, but that they had actually lived through the biblical apocalypse, and that the monsters were demons, sent to Earth to annihilate humanity. Only a few would be spared, as in the ark of Noah, to rebuild a cleaner world. Several facts through the novel support her belief.

The book ends on a light note, with Molly deciding to write a book again – not to publish it, but for her son or daughter, soon to be born. When Neil asks her what the book will be about, she answers "Hope".

== Miniseries ==
On December 18, 2006, it was announced that Sam Raimi had formed a television unit of his production company, Ghost House Pictures, and one of the first projects planned was a miniseries adaptation of The Taking. Larry Block, who packaged and brought the book concept to Ghost House, was officially attached to serve as a co-executive producer alongside Raimi and Rob Tapert. However, no further development on the miniseries was ever made.
