= Odd Thomas (novel) =

2003 novel by Dean Koontz

- Author: Dean Koontz
- Cover artist: Tom Hallman
- Language: English
- Series: Odd Thomas
- Genre: Thriller, Mystery
- Publisher: Bantam Publishing
- Publication date: 2003
- Publication place: United States
- Media type: Paperback
- Pages: 446
- ISBN: 0-553-58449-9
- OCLC: 56812155
- Preceded by: In Odd We Trust
- Followed by: Forever Odd

Odd Thomas is a thriller novel by American writer Dean Koontz, published in 2003. The novel derives its title from the protagonist, a 20-year-old short-order cook named Odd Thomas. The book, well received and lauded by critics, went on to become a New York Times Best Seller. Following the success of the novel, six sequels, Forever Odd (2005), Brother Odd (2006), Odd Hours (2008), Odd Apocalypse (2012), and Deeply Odd (2013), were also written by Koontz. The final novel in the series Saint Odd (2015) was released on Jan 13, 2015. Three graphic-novel prequels, In Odd We Trust, Odd Is On Our Side and House of Odd have also been released. In the postscript to the graphic novel, Koontz states that "God willing, there will be six Odd Thomas novels." A Special Odd Thomas Adventure (short novel), Odd Interlude, was released on December 26, 2012, and another Odd Thomas: You Are Destined to Be Together Forever on December 9, 2014. The novel was also adapted into a film of the same name in 2013.

== Plot summary ==
In the beginning of the book, Odd Thomas is silently approached by the ghost of a young girl brutally raped and murdered, and through his unique ability to understand the dead, is psychically led to her killer, a former schoolmate named Harlo Landerson. Koontz discloses how Odd was named and begins, layer by layer, to show how Odd's dysfunctional upbringing has shaped his life, and as those details are uncovered, his supernatural abilities begin to make more sense.

While working as a short order cook in a California desert town, Odd meets a suspicious-looking man in the diner followed by bodachs, shadowy spirit creatures who appear only during times of death and disaster. This man, whom Odd nicknames "Fungus Man" (due to his waxy complexion and blond hair that resembles mold), has an unusually large swarm of bodachs following him, and Odd is convinced that this man is connected to some terrible catastrophe that is about to occur. To gather more information about him, Odd uses his gift of supernatural intuition, which his soulmate Bronwen (a.k.a. Stormy) Llewellyn calls "psychic magnetism," to track him down.

Odd's sixth sense leads him to Fungus Man's home, and Odd begins to uncover more details about the man and a mysterious other-worldly link to the dark forces about to be unleashed on the town of Pico Mundo. Accompanied sometimes by the ghost of Elvis Presley and encountering other memorable spirits, including a murdered prostitute, Odd is soon deeply involved in an attempt to prevent the disastrous bloodshed he knows will happen the next day.

== Characters ==
=== Odd Thomas ===
"I see dead people. But then, by God, I do something about it." – Odd Thomas pg. 32

Odd could see the dead and also see shadowy figures that normally lurk around people that will cause deaths or will die. They are called bodachs and feed on the pain of others. Odd is a 20 year old short-order cook at a breakfast joint in Pico Mundo. His girlfriend is Stormy. Little Ozzie is his best friend. Odd leads a simple life because he has to, since he finds the job of speaking to the lingering dead complicated enough. Odd is an optimist seeing the good in most individuals despite his troubling life; he fears going anywhere with a large population because it would interfere with his "simple life"—he would be overwhelmed by the volume of dead in a large city like Los Angeles. He never told his father or mother because he thought that his father would use his son's powers to make himself rich. He once met a boy who also saw bodachs but when the bodachs realized this, they seemed to cause a fatal accident, killing the little boy instantly, so Odd keeps this ability a secret.

=== Stormy Llewellyn ===
"Loop me in, Odd One." – Stormy Llewellyn

Odd's destiny. Stormy's real name is Bronwen but she prefers to be called Stormy because she thinks this makes her sound less like an elf. She is the manager of an ice cream shop and hopes to own a shop of her own some day. Stormy's parents died when she was very young. She was adopted by a couple when she was 7. Her foster father sexually molested her for almost 3 months. She reported him to a social worker and was moved to an orphanage where she lived until seventeen, at which point she was cared for by her uncle, Father Sean Llewellyn, rector of St. Bartholomew's church. She remained under his legal guardianship until she could become independent. She is a strong believer in delayed gratification, that this life is a "boot camp" for the next, which she calls "service," and that finally in the third life are the rewards. She insists on waiting for sex with Odd until marriage, hoping to make their first time together a meaningful experience and to not bring the memories of her abuse on their bed. She also is the only person who knows everything about Odd seeing the dead. She is killed in the first Odd Thomas novel during the mall shooting.

=== Chief Wyatt Porter ===
The Chief helps Odd many times, acting almost as a surrogate father. He is one of the few people who knows Odd sees the dead but he does not know all of Odd's secrets. He is shot 4 times by one of the antagonists who would later shoot people at the mall but survives.

=== Robert Thomas "Fungus Man" Robertson ===
Fungus Man or Robert Thomas Robertson is initially portrayed as the main antagonist. He comes to Pico Mundo surrounded by bodachs and immediately Odd is suspicious of him. Little is explained about Robertson directly. Odd finds that he is obsessed with serial killers as evidenced by the files he keeps on them. Robertson was approached by Eckles, Varner, and Gosset a few months before the incident at the Green Moon Mall, having met them at a satanic cult gathering. They were interested only in his mother's money. Eckles, Varner, and Gosset killed Robertson's mother (with his permission) and gave him her ears as a trophy. Robertson is murdered by one of his conspirators when they find out that Odd's attention is being drawn towards them and their plans. Robertson then becomes one of the lingering dead and stalks Odd for a short time as a poltergeist. When Robertson's ghost confronts Odd at his home, he goes into an uncontrollable rage, destroying much of the kitchen. Odd leaves him there in the house where he is assumed to still be haunting.

=== Bern Eckles, Simon Varner and Kevin Gosset ===
These three had conspired with Robert Thomas Robertson to have a mass killing at the mall. The three had gotten involved in ritualistic satanism as teenagers and first killed when they were 15 on a "dare." They pledged their loyalty to their "dark god," vowing to go into careers in which they could promote satanism and chaos. Varner and Eckles became cops, while Gosset became a school teacher. Varner had killed Robert Thomas Robertson after he found out that Odd had been in Robertson's house and suspected him, he then tried to frame Odd for the murder. Eckles and Varner were the two gunmen that Odd subdued: Eckles first with the bat then Varner with a shot to the shoulder and head. Gosset had shot Odd twice in the back, Odd managed to pull the wires out of the bomb, thereby disarming it as he fell to the ground. Gosset later told everything that had happened between all the conspirators. They called the atrocity "just another way of worshipping."

=== Little Ozzie ===
Nicknamed 'little' despite being larger than his father, Ozzie has a 6th finger on his left hand and has published many very successful detective novels. He has a pet cat named Terrible Chester who Ozzie claims is over 50 years old, and has pictures to prove it. Terrible Chester does not like Odd and Little Ozzie is one of the few people who knows about Odd's 'Gifts'.

== Odd Thomas film adaptation ==
Novelist Dean Koontz told San Diego Comic-Con attendees on July 26, 2008, that he had a movie script adapted from his book Odd Thomas and he's very pleased with the results. Koontz also teased that an unnamed actor has signed on to play the title character, but refused to reveal any further details. Koontz added that after reading the script, which was written by an unnamed screenwriter, he 'fell over' because it was 'so perfect.'

The unnamed writer was confirmed in November 2010 to be American filmmaker Stephen Sommers, who also handled the directing. The film was produced independently by Howard Kaplan and John Baldecchi.

It was announced in February 2011 that Anton Yelchin was cast to play the title role. After being delayed by a series of lawsuits, Movie Insider reported that the film adaptation was scheduled for release in the United States on April 5, 2013. The movie did poorly at the box office and there will be no sequels with Anton Yelchin due to his tragic death on June 19, 2016.

The movie won the Saturn Award for Best DVD/Blu-Ray release in 2015 from the Academy of Science Fiction, Fantasy and Horror Films.
