= Odd Is on Our Side =

2010 graphic novel written by Fred Van Lente and Dean Koontz

- Author: Fred Van Lente, Dean Koontz
- Illustrator: Queenie Chan
- Language: English
- Genre: Thriller, Mystery
- Publisher: Del Rey Books
- Publication date: October 2010
- Publication place: United States
- Media type: Manga
- ISBN: 978-0-345-51560-5
- Preceded by: In Odd We Trust
- Followed by: House of Odd

Odd Is on Our Side is the second graphic novel featuring Dean Koontz's character Odd Thomas. It was released in October 2010. It is written by Fred Van Lente and Koontz, with illustrations by Queenie Chan in a manga style.

== Characters ==
=== Odd Thomas ===
Odd Thomas is the protagonist of the Odd Thomas series. He is a short-order cook at the Pico Mundo grill, who has the ability to see the lingering dead. He uses this ability to try to bring peace to the ghosts he encounters, so that they can move on to the next life. Traumatic childhood experiences left him extremely uncomfortable with guns, so he relies on his resourcefulness to escape the sometimes hostile situations in which he finds himself.

=== Stormy Llewellyn ===
Stormy Llewellyn is Odd's girlfriend and soulmate. She grew up in an orphanage, except for a six-month stint in which she was adopted by a family, only to be sexually abused. Stormy intends to marry Odd, but she is waiting until she overcomes her traumatic past. She does not share Odd's fear of guns, and carries a pistol with which she provides backup for Odd on his adventures.

=== Chief Wyatt Porter ===
Wyatt Porter is the Chief of Police in Pico Mundo, and serves as a father figure to Odd. He is one of the few people who are aware of Odd's abilities, and has sometimes been able to catch elusive criminals with Odd's paranormal help.
