= Fairview Press =

Former publishing arm of Fairview Health Services, formerly Deaconess Press

- Parent company: Fairview Health Services
- Status: Defunct
- Predecessor: Deaconess Press
- Founded: 1989
- Successor: Rowman & Littlefield
- Country of origin: United States
- Headquarters location: Minneapolis, Minnesota
- Publication types: Books
- Nonfiction topics: Health

Fairview Press (formerly Deaconess Press) was the publishing former arm of Fairview Health Services, a regional healthcare provider affiliated with the University of Minnesota. Fairview Press published books and other forms of patient education materials on topics such as aging and eldercare, grief and bereavement, and health and wellness. Fairview Press published from Minneapolis, Minnesota until their assets were sold to the Rowman and Littlefield Publishing Group of Lanham, Maryland.

== History ==
=== 1989 to 1995 ===
Publishing commenced under the name of Deaconess Press, with an initial editorial focus on behavioral therapy—including chemical dependency treatment, recovery, and prevention literature.

=== 1995 to 1997 ===
Name changed to Fairview Press. In 1996, Fairview Press signed a distribution agreement with the National Book Network, and expanded its editorial focus to trade book acquisition. Titles from this period encompassed a broad range of non-fiction books dedicated to parenting and family issues. Fairview Press authors appeared in various mass media outlets, including The Oprah Winfrey Show, The Today Show, and The Tonight Show with Jay Leno. The company published a number of popular general-interest hardcover books during this time, including Good Morning, Captain (autobiography of Bob Keeshan, TV’s original Captain Kangaroo) and a book series by TV’s original Slim Goodbody. Trade paperback parenting titles from this period included Jeanette Gadeberg's Raising Strong Daughters and Brave New Girls, as well as Selling Out America's Children by David Walsh (psychologist), founder of National Institute on Media and the Family.

=== 1997 to 2000 ===
Economic contraction within the retail book industry resulted in high returns in consignment inventory, forcing the publisher to downsize and to once again change the focus of its publishing program to better align itself with the healthcare mission of its parent company. Acquisitions focused primarily on books dealing with aging, health and wellness, and grief & bereavement—which the publisher sold through retail channels as well as to hospitals, state and federal agencies, and NGOs. Key titles from this period include Elizabeth Levang's When Men Grieve, Janis Silverman's Help Me Say Goodbye, and The Underground Guide to Teenage Sexuality by health scientist Michael J. Basso.

=== 2000 to 2010 ===
Fairview Press continued to acquire and publish some unsolicited trade book manuscripts, as well as material written by staff, professional affiliates, and other local authors. Sample titles acquired during the press' final years of active publishing included a series of art therapy books for children, anthologies of aging-related interviews by former National Public Radio staff member Connie Goldman, and four books on complementary and alternative medicine published in cooperation with the Center for Spirituality and Healing at the University of Minnesota. The inspirational volumes in the Positive Quotations series spent more than 84 combined weeks on Nielsen BookScan's bestseller lists for Reference works/Self-help books. Fairview Press won several National Mature Media Awards, state book awards, and American Journal of Nursing Book-of-the-Year Awards.

=== 2012 ===
The Rowman & Littlefield Publishing Group acquired the assets of Fairview Press in Spring 2012. The Fairview Press imprint name was not part of the deal, so the list will be handled by a combination of RLPG imprints depending on subject matter ranging from Taylor Trade to Rowman & Littlefield.
