= Brother Odd =

2006 novel by Dean Koontz

- Cover of the first edition of Brother Odd
- Author: Dean Koontz
- Cover artist: Tom Hallman
- Language: English
- Series: The Odd Thomas series
- Genre: Suspense novel, Psychological novel
- Publisher: Bantam Publishing
- Publication date: 28 November 2006
- Publication place: United States
- Media type: Print (Hardback)
- Pages: 352 pp
- ISBN: 0-553-80480-4
- OCLC: 71810110
- Dewey Decimal: 813/.54 22
- LC Class: PS3561.O55 F66 2006c
- Preceded by: Forever Odd
- Followed by: Odd Hours

Brother Odd is a novel by Dean Koontz, published in 2006. The novel is the third book in Koontz's series focusing on a young man named Odd Thomas.

== Plot summary ==
The novel begins seven months after Forever Odd. During that time, Odd Thomas has been a guest at St. Bartholomew's Abbey, where he hopes to seek peace and understanding. During his time there, he befriends a white-furred dog who assists him in his further adventures.

Odd sees a shade-like bodach. This portends great disaster for the abbey. One of the monks disappears and Odd is attacked by a mysterious killer. As he searches for the missing monk, Odd hears an odd noise in a great snowstorm, and later sees an intricate, shifting pattern of bones against a window.

Rodion Romanovich, the abbey's other guest, meets Odd in the garage to pick up the monks. Odd, suspicious of Romanovich, intends to leave him in the abbey but he takes one sport utility vehicle (SUV) full of monks before Odd can stop him. On the way there, Romanovich's SUV is turned over by a bone-creature. Brother Knuckles, Odd's confidant, damages the creature with the other plow, saving everyone. Back at the school, Odd and Romanovich are able to determine that Jacob's father, the Neverwas, is John Heineman, a monk at the abbey known as Brother John and a former physicist who experimented with reality.

Later, Odd decides to leave the abbey, but as he rides down the highway back to his hometown, psychic magnetism pulls him out of the car, where the book ends as he walks down the highway toward the unknown. After three adventures, Elvis Presley, who sometimes assists Odd, finally crosses over. Odd and the dog (who is now revealed to be a ghost) continue along together, only to be united moments later with the ghost of Frank Sinatra.

== Reception ==
A reviewer of Kirkus Reviews commented "Terrific characterization and patient plotting mark Koontz's work, and this novel about the triumph of modesty over hubris proves exemplary on both counts. A work both exciting and engaging—and with its heart in the right place."
