= Gaelic folklore =

Gaelic folklore may refer to:

- Irish folklore
- Scottish folklore
- Manx folklore
- Celtic mythology
- Irish mythology
- Scottish mythology
- Hebridean mythology and folklore
