= Odd Apocalypse =

2012 novel by Dean Koontz

- Author: Dean Koontz
- Language: English
- Genre: Thriller, mystery
- Publisher: Bantam Publishing
- Publication date: 2012
- Publication place: United States
- Media type: Print (paperback)
- Pages: 368
- ISBN: 978-0-553-80774-5
- Preceded by: Odd Hours
- Followed by: Deeply Odd

Odd Apocalypse (2012) is the fifth thriller novel in the Odd Thomas series by the American writer Dean Koontz.

== Plot summary ==
Odd Thomas and his traveling companion Annamaria have been invited by a reclusive billionaire to be his guests at his sprawling, pristine estate, Roseland. However, something is deeply wrong within the walls of the sprawling property. The few staff there harbor malice to anyone from the outside world, and as Odd explores the estate, the land and buildings seem to flip between static beauty and a hell on earth... which he finds is influenced by machinery designed by a genius from the past. Odd can't just gather his friend, their dogs (one alive, one a ghost) and escape. Despite the warnings, Annamaria, who has mysteries of her own, has hinted to Odd that Roseland has secrets far more sinister than just an unusual state of preservation. He needs to find someone hidden within the unhappy preserve who is going to need all his help.

== Characters ==
=== Odd Thomas ===
"I see dead people. But then, by God, I do something about it." – Odd Thomas pg. 29

Odd escorts Annamaria to Roseland and instinctively trusts her when she tells him he is there for a reason. The estate is pristine, and seems to be in a far better condition than the few people who work the estate could possibly maintain. He is overcome with prophetic visions, more than his normal talent for seeing the restless dead.

He meets the spirit of a woman riding a horse in a long white dress stained red from wounds that she received at her death. As he tries to understand her needs and help her, the sky behind her turns an unnatural color, becomes stained with the dark jet-streams of the debris of war, and he sees impossible, physical monsters wheeling to attack him. He barely escapes the danger, and resolves to explore the secrets of Roseland more deeply: both of the land and its inhabitants.

=== Annamaria ===
Annamaria is a young pregnant woman, whom Odd met in Magic Beach in the fourth book, Odd Hours. After leaving Magic Beach with Odd, Noah Wolflaw becomes intrigued by her and invites the two of them to stay at the guest house of the Roseland estate.

=== Noah Wolflaw ===
Owner of the Roseland estate. He purchased the property from former newspaper mogul Constanine Cloyce who built the estate in the 1920s. He has several live-in full-time staff members from housekeepers, gardeners, and security staff. He is well liked by his staff and the Roseland estate is always in pristine condition.

=== Chef Shilshom ===
Chef Shilshom is the resident cook at Roseland who Odd describes as having the "feet of a ballerina grafted onto the massive legs of a sumo wrestler."

=== Kenneth Randolph Fitzgerald Mountbatten ===
"Kenny" for short, born "Jack Keister" is an intimidating individual who Odd met in the Roseland stables. He is described as having a shaved head, a scared face, crooked, yellow teeth, and a cold sore on his lip. He stands at six feet five, weighs around two hundred fifty pounds and has tattoos of screaming hyenas on his thick wrists.

=== Boo ===
Boo is the spirit of a white German-shepherd mix that Odd met in the third novel. He is the only spirit dog that Odd has ever seen.

=== Raphael ===
Raphael is a living golden retriever that got attached to Odd in the fourth book and accompanied Odd and Annamaria to Roseland.
