= Saint Odd =

2015 thriller novel by Dean Koontz

- Author: Dean Koontz
- Cover artist: Claudio Marinesco
- Language: English
- Genre: Thriller, mystery
- Publisher: Bantam Books
- Publication date: January 13, 2015
- Publication place: United States
- Media type: Print (hardback)
- Pages: 352
- ISBN: 978-0345545879
- Preceded by: Deeply Odd

Saint Odd (2015) is the seventh and final thriller novel in the Odd Thomas series by American writer Dean Koontz. The book was initially released on January 13, 2015, by Bantam Books.

== Plot ==
Odd Thomas returns to Pico Mundo only to find himself immediately under attack from surviving members of the satanic cult he encountered in previous books. As he rides the back roads on a heavy motorcycle, he survives the first attempt on his life by evading a large SUV. Odd travels off-road and tricks the driver of the SUV into driving into a deep gully, killing everyone inside as the SUV explodes. Odd first travels to the mall where Stormy and 18 others were murdered, narrowly avoiding three cultists who, coincidentally or through Odd's psychic magnetism, are visiting the mall where the cult's members nearly caused hundreds of deaths. Odd takes the bike to a safe house run by the same organization he helped in the last novel after meeting Mrs. Fischer. The safe house is run by an older couple who tell him they've been married for years and, as the husband says, have only had "5 bad days in all those years." His wife contradicts him saying "There were 6, you need to figure out where we're differing." Odd sleeps in the house's guest room and dreams of Pico Mundo flooded with visions of people, both recognized and not, floating by him and having expressions of rage. After reuniting with the Chief Porter and novelist Ozzy Boone, he discovers that the cult has obtained enough C4 to destroy a nearby dam. Destroying the dam would partially flood the town, but not enough to cause the destruction and death in his vision. He visits the dam and has an epiphany after seeing coyotes.

Odd returns to the safe house to find it under siege from the cultists, all of whom end up dead at the hands of the caretakers. Mrs. Fischer and a "Cleaning Crew" arrive and make the safe house as if nobody ever lived there while Odd and Mrs. Fischer meet in her limo. He is then forced to embark on a violent cat and mouse game with the cultists. A paramilitary strike team chases him through an almond orchard and, failing to locate him, begin blowing up the orchard's buildings. Using the explosions to cover his escape, Odd discovers two cultists talking about conducting the ritual rape and killing of a small family who own a ranch nearby. Odd kills the cultists and runs to the farmhouse in time to get the family to hide in the barn. Odd hides in the landscaping and then enters the house, following the cultists after they make their incursion. Odd ends up killing all of the cult members including a female he described as having an "innocent child's face." Odd suffers a deep knife wound from the female cultist before she dies, and then sees her ghost waiting for him. Odd ignores her, which causes her to go into a poltergeist rage while Odd escapes the house.

Thomas notes the demons ("Bodachs") that previously congregated in advance of violent events are not in evidence. He finally determines that the cult is planning to release a deadly version of the rabies virus through the prank air blasts emanating from a funhouse in a visiting carnival. The Bodachs have not appeared because they are only interested in immediate violence, not disease. He is able to stop the plot, but at the cost of a mortal gunshot wound. After death, he is reunited with his girlfriend Stormy Llewellyn who briefs him on what he will be encountering in the afterlife. His author friend then finds the manuscript of this book mysteriously printing on his laser printer.

== Reception ==
Saint Odd won the Goodreads Choice Award for Horror in 2015.
