= Odd Hours =

2008 novel by Dean Koontz

- Author: Dean Koontz
- Cover artist: Tom Hallman
- Language: English
- Series: Odd Thomas
- Genre: Thriller, Mystery
- Publisher: Bantam Books
- Publication date: May 20, 2008
- Publication place: United States
- Media type: Hardcover
- Pages: 400
- Preceded by: Brother Odd
- Followed by: Odd Apocalypse

Odd Hours is the fourth novel in the Odd Thomas series by Dean Koontz. It was released on May 20, 2008.

== Plot summary ==
After leaving the monastery in the previous book, Odd found a place to stay in Magic Beach with a retired actor, Lawrence Hutchison, Hutch to his friends. While out for a walk one morning, he finds a woman whom he had been seeing in his dreams; a young, pregnant woman who calls herself Annamaria. After being assaulted and nearly killed by a large man with two henchmen in tow, Odd is separated from Annamaria, though he uses his psychic magnetism to find her. Once he finds her they decide they need to leave immediately, but while making preparations to do so they hear a car door slam. They manage to find a spot to hide until after the men who had been chasing them leave. With the men now gone, Odd and Annamaria set out walking. On their walk, they encounter a large pack of coyotes that Annamaria somehow persuades to leave.

After leaving Annamaria with a trusted friend, Odd tries to find the man that assaulted him on the beach, only to find him and an unknown woman dead. As he flees police, he encounters a new companion in a Golden Retriever that accompanies him to a local church, where he is subsequently turned over to the sheriff of Magic Beach, but not before he hides his ID in a church pew. The sheriff, a man who seems to have many personalities, believes Odd is a government agent who has come to spy on his operation: the delivery and shipment of multiple nuclear weapons to terrorist groups inside the US via the Magic Beach harbor.

Odd manages to convince the Sheriff that he is a government experiment gone wrong and that he is willing to be bribed in order to look the other way. While the sheriff is setting up a transaction to buy his loyalty Odd manages to enrage the spirit of Frank Sinatra, who began accompanying him after the departure of Elvis. The rage caused by his spirit creates a violent whirlwind, and in the confusion Odd is able to escape from the police department.

He is able to make his way down to the harbor with the help of a stranger, Birdie Hopkins, who said she felt the urge to go driving and happened upon him. While driving him to the harbor she also insists he take her gun because she believes he will need it. Odd is able to sneak aboard the craft that is carrying the nukes. He is able to corner one of the men in the radio room and get information from him before being forced to kill him. Odd is able to dispatch the remaining crew, including the large man from the pier, in order to secure the ship and its dangerous cargo. He manages to run the boat aground in a nearby cove ensuring that the Coast Guard will respond to the boat going off course and find the nukes. He later calls the FBI from a pay phone relaying the story and asking them to follow up with the Coast Guard for validation.

Odd returns to the church to retrieve his ID, but is surprised by the sheriff when leaving. While attempting to escape, he runs into the priest and his wife. Odd learns that both the priest and his wife were also involved with the plan to sell nuclear weapons through Magic Beach. The priest kills his wife and is then killed by the sheriff, who is in turn killed by one of his henchmen. The henchman, identified primarily as 'Meth Mouth' talks to Odd, still believing him to be a psychic government agent. While laughing over a joke of Meth Mouth's, Odd shoots him under the table with the wife's gun. Odd then takes a moment to contact the Department of Homeland Security to advise them where they could find the triggers he removed from the nuclear devices.

The story ends with Odd and Annamaria, along with the golden retriever now named Raphael, leaving Magic Beach in a car loaned to them by Hutch, flush with money he insisted Odd take. Odd is sobbing over the murder of so many people, almost all at his hands. Annamaria comforts him with the knowledge that while he may have ended a few lives, he saved millions more. She then pulls the car over and asks Odd to show her the constellation Cassiopeia. Odd and Stormy would often point out Cassiopeia together as that was Stormy's mother's name, so Annamaria's request startles him, but he points the constellation out to her.

== Webisodes ==
A four-part series debuting in April 2008, Odd Passenger detailed events between Brother Odd and Odd Hours. They were produced by Escape Goat Pictures and were directed by Jack Paccione Jr., with Odd played by Anthony Marks.

== Connections to Koontz's other works ==
At the start of the book, Odd is wearing a sweatshirt with the words MYSTERY TRAIN on it. Later, he changes to a T-shirt with WYVERN on the front. These are references to the Moonlight Bay Trilogy and suggest a possible link between the two series.
