= Deeply Odd =

Book by Dean Koontz

- Author: Dean Koontz
- Language: English
- Genre: Thriller, mystery
- Publisher: Bantam Books
- Publication date: 2013
- Publication place: United States
- Media type: Print (hardback)
- Pages: 352
- ISBN: 978-0553807738
- Preceded by: Odd Apocalypse
- Followed by: Saint Odd

Deeply Odd (2013) is the sixth thriller novel in the Odd Thomas series by American writer Dean Koontz.

== Plot summary ==
About a month after the events detailed in Odd Apocalypse, Odd Thomas encounters a demented truck driver. During this encounter, when he touches the trucker, Odd suddenly has a vision of three children being burned alive by someone wearing a red suit, black shirt, and black mask. At that moment Odd knows that the trucker experienced the same vision and is actually the person torching the children. Immediately, the trucker tries unsuccessfully to kill Odd. Because Odd knows he must help the children, he goes after the trucker even though the man tried to kill him. Knowing that he needs a vehicle, Odd steals an SUV being used as a get-away vehicle during a robbery but wrecks it. Then, he spots a limousine approaching him. The driver, who turns out to be an elderly, feisty, intriguing, and sometimes mysterious lady, stops, asks him a few questions, and offers him a job as her chauffeur. He reluctantly takes the job and eventually manages to track the trucker to an isolated mansion guarded by vicious dogs. Devil worshippers offer their sacrifices here, and they are planning on murdering a large group of children in a mass sacrifice. Alfred Hitchcock's ghost, which has been periodically appearing to Odd, explains several of the precepts about the cultists. They are wealthy, powerful, vicious people who do whatever they want and get away with it because the entity they worship protects them. Odd is shocked that Hitchcock's ghost speaks to him because he never has before; the lingering dead simply do not speak. Hitchcock explains to Odd that the only thing that really matters at this point in time is saving the children. Odd is vastly outnumbered and can certainly die in the attempt.

Pretending to be a fellow cultist, Odd kills five of the cult members and manages to free the children, escaping the property and the demonic chaos that is being unleashed on the remaining cult members. He eventually makes it to the limousine where his patron Mrs. Fischer and the rescued children are waiting. She drives them to a very comfortable looking home where a very pleasant couple takes everyone inside. Once everyone is inside, five more adults and nine more children join them. They all treat the rescued children with kindness, feed them, talk with them, listen to them, and spend healing time with them. Later, while sitting on a sofa and focusing on a card that he has in his hand, Odd realizes that the five adults and nine children who had arrived earlier are gone. Then, he is told that the children he rescued are going to be taken to their homes. They will not remember any of the atrocities to which they were subjected.

The immediate problems set before Odd are resolved in this book, but hints of the endgame abound. The author has stated that the seventh book will be the last in the Odd Thomas series.

== Reception ==
Publishers Weekly commented stating: "the farce in this novel often undercuts the terror." While Wayne C. Rogers for Horror Novel Reviews reported that "within the first couple of pages of Deeply Odd, I found myself lost inside this intriguing story of “good versus evil”. Even more importantly, it’s a novel about hope."
