= Cantilenae Intelectuales de Phoenice Redivivo =

1622 book by Michael Maier

Intellectual Cantilenae
- Author: Michael Maier
- Original title: Cantilenae Intelectuales In Triadas 9 distinctae, de Phoenice Redivivo; hoc est, Medicinarum omnium pretiossissima, qaue Mundi epitome & Universi speculum est, non tam alta voce, quam profunda mente dictata, & pro clave ternorum irreserabilium in Chymia Arcanorum rationabilibus ministrata.
- Translator: Le Mascrier; M. Dickman
- Subject: Alchemy
- Genre: Narrative nonfiction
- Publisher: Rome, 1622, Rostock, 1623
- English publication date: 1997

Cantilenae Intelectuales de Phoenice Redivivo or Intellectual Cantilenae is an alchemical book by Michael Maier, published in 1622. It was the final text of Maier's published during his lifetime. His dedication for the book, to Frederick, Prince of Norway is dated August 22, 1662, in Rostock.

James Brown Craven described it as "one of the most curious and rare of Maier's books". He knew it only in a 1758 French translation: Michael Maieri Cantilenae Intelectuales de Phoenice Redivivo; ou Chansons Intelectuelles sur la resurection Du Phenix...traduites...par M.L.L.M.. "The title promises much- "Nine Triads of Intellectual Songs on the Resurrection of the Phoenix: or the most precious of all medicines, the Mirror and abridgement of this Universe, proposed less to the ear than to the mind, and presented to the wise as the key of the three impenetrable Secrets of Chemistry."

Like in Atalanta Fugiens, Maier has organized his book into musical voices. Each of the nine triads is expressed as harmonies of altus, tenor, and bass voices. Maier tells us that the altus expresses "the dulcet tones of Venus"; the tenor is the sideward moving lobster or crayfish; and the bass is reserved for the lion. Maier assigns distinct purposes to these voices: "The first of the quadrate triads treats of the names given divers things; the second contains Allegories; and in the third are to be found the application of the mysteries of this Art to those of Religion."

== History ==
The original was first printed in Rome 1622. The 1758 French translation is from the 1623 print at Rostock. This edition is in Latin and French, in parallel pages.

An English translation was made from the French by Mike Dickman in 1997. A German edition with commentary was made by Erik Leibenguth in 2002.
