= Antoaneta Sabău =

Romanian classical philologist (born 1982)

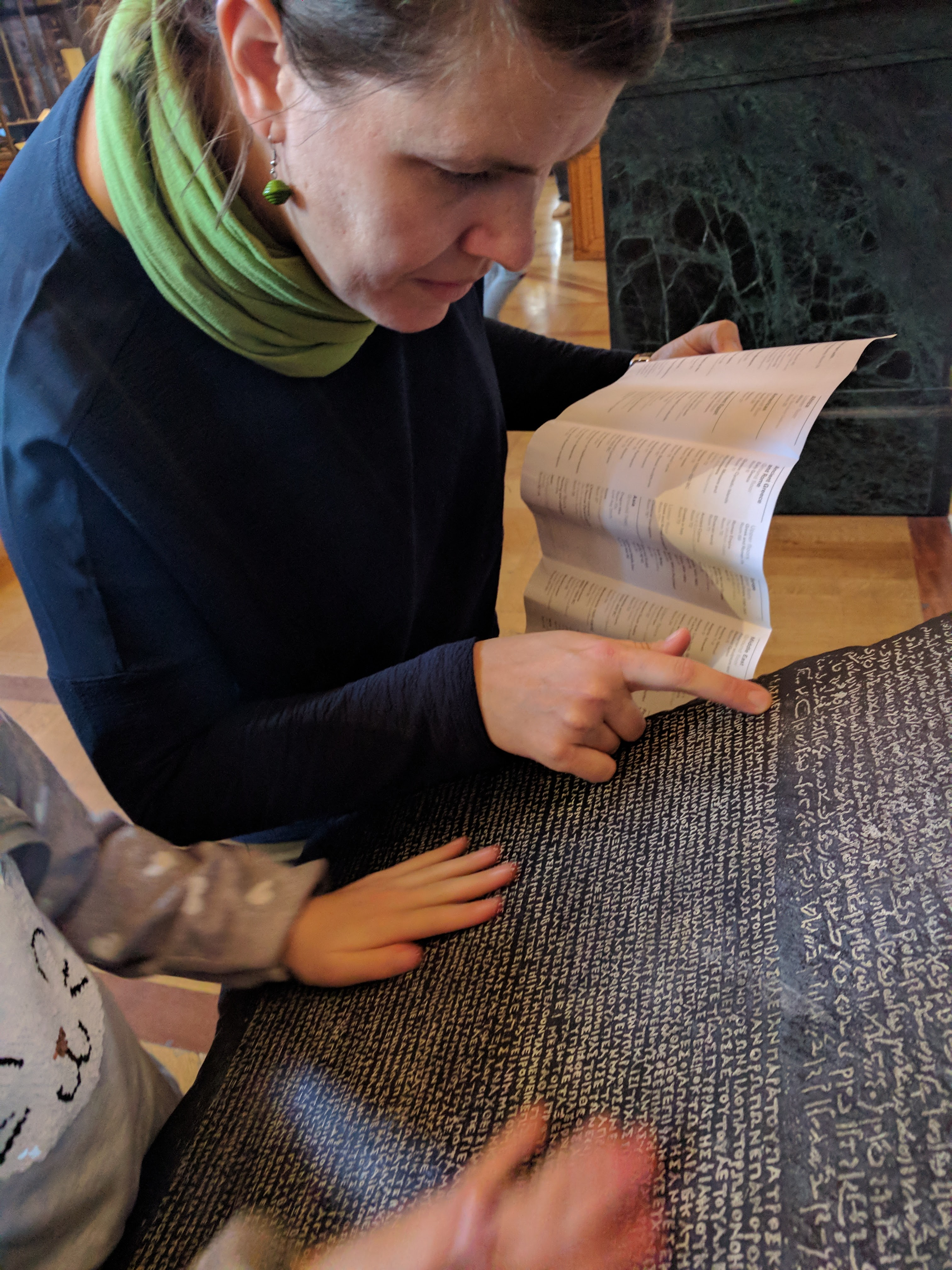
Antoaneta Sabău

Antoaneta Sabău (12 August 1982, Mangalia) is a Romanian classicist, translator and editor. Her main contribution are mainly in the field of medieval and translation studies.

== Studies ==
Antoaneta Sabău studied classical languages at Bucharest University, and medieval studies at Central European University. She had research stays at Centre Sèvres (Paris), University College Dublin, Warburg Institute (University of London), Pontifical Institute for Medieval Studies (Toronto). She received a certificate in medieval Latin from the Pontifical Institute for Medieval Studies (Toronto).

== Academic activity ==
Antoaneta Sabău studies textual tradition of Ignatius of Loyola's Spiritual Exercises. She translated from Latin, ancient Greek, and biblical Hebrew. She translated into Romanian language from Thomas Aquinas, Ignatius de Loyola, Anthony Kenny, Alvin Plantinga, Daniel Dannett etc. In 2017 she founded Andre Scrima fellowship for research in the field of theology, philosophy and history, and in 2019 founded Dan Slușanschi School for Classical and Oriental Languages, hosted by Lucian Blaga University. The school teaches Latin, Spoken Latin, Ancient Greek, biblical Hebrew, Coptic, and Old Slavonic. She is a member of the editorial team of the journal Review of Ecumenical Studies.

== Interviews ==
- Freedom TV Europe: Meet Antoaneta Sabău at Center for Dialog and Culture „Dr. Friedrich Teutsch“
- Presentation of the Institute for Ecumenical Research
- Interview with Antoaneta Sabău, by Ștefan Colceriu
- Radio Trinitas: Interviu cu Antoaneta Sabău
- Studiul intensiv al limbilor clasice (cu Antoaneta Sabău și Florin Călian)
- Deus meus in te confido (Ps 25,2)

== See also ==
- Dan Slușanschi
- Ignatius of Loyola
- Florin George Călian
- Lucian Blaga University

== Bibliography ==
Nicht jeder Spezialist ist auch ein Intellektueller, Forscher Florin George Călian erzählt von Antoaneta Sabău, der Antike und Dan Slușanschi

Review of Ecumenical Studies Editorial Team Member Antoaneta Sabău

Europas alten Buchstaben auf den Zahn gefühlt

Portret al traducătoarei la vreme de cumpănă
