= Dan Slușanschi =

Romanian classicist

Dan Slușanschi (12 September 1943 – 22 July 2008) was a 20th century Romanian classicist and specialist in Indo-European linguistics who made contributions in the fields of Ancient Greek, Latin/Medieval Latin and Persian. He is known for his editions and translations of Dimitrie Cantemir's works.

== Studies ==
Dan Slușanschi graduated in 1965 from the Faculty of Classical Philology of the University of Bucharest. He received his doctorate in classical and Indo-European philology in 1972. He was a professor at the University of Bucharest, where he taught Latin language syntax, Indo-European linguistics (language and mythology), history of Sanskrit literature, ancient Persian (history, civilization, language), history of the Latin language, Greek syntax, medieval and neo-Latin Latin, text criticism, and ancient metrics. He was a visiting professor at the universities of Brussels, Liege, Berlin, Caen, Chisinau, Cluj, Timisoara, and Constanta. He had a doctor honoris causa from the University of Caen.

== Legacy ==
The Lucian Blaga University of Sibiu holds a school of classical and oriental languages, which bears the name Dan Slusanschi School for Classical and Oriental Languages. The main languages promoted by the school are Latin, Ancient Greek, Sahidic Coptic, Biblical Hebrew and Old Slavonic. The school was founded by Antoaneta Sabău and Florin George Călian.

== Publications ==
=== Editions ===
- Textele latine din anexa la L. Protopopescu, Contributii la istoria învatamîntului în Transilvania, Craiova, 1966.
- D. Cantemir, Historia Moldo-Vlachica and De antiquis et hodiernis Moldaviae nominibus (în Opere Complete, IX, 1), Bucuresti, Editura Academiei, 1983.
- D. Cantemir, Encomia in authorem, în V. Candea (ed.), Sistima religiei muhammedane, Bucuresti, Editura Academiei, 1987 (Opere Complete, VIII, 2).
- D. Cantemir, Vita Constantini Cantemyrii, Moldaviae Principis, Bucuresti, Editura Academiei, 1996 (Opere Complete, VI, 1 - cu A. Pippidi si I. Campeanu).
- Virgil, Aeneis, Bucuresti, Paideia, 2000, 2 vols. (I. Editie critica)
- D. Cantemir, Incrementorum & Decrementorum Aulae Othmanicae libri III, editia critica princeps, Amarcord, 2001.
- D. Cantemir, Descriptio Moldaviae, editia critica princeps, Bucuresti, Anastasia, 2005.
- D. Cantemir, Sacro-Sanctae Scientiae Indepingibilis Imago, editie critica, Bucuresti, EUB, 2005.

=== Translations ===
- Dimitrie Cantemir, De antiquis et hodiernis Moldaviae nominibus; Historia Moldo-Vlachica Opere complete, Vol.IX, Partea I: De antiquis et hodiernis. Moldaviae nominibus, Prefața de Virgil Cândea. Ediție critică, traducere, introducere, note și indici de Dan Slușanschi, Editura Academiei, București, 1983.
- E. Benveniste, Vocabularul institutiilor indo-europene, Bucuresti, Paideia, 1999, I; 2005, I-II.
- Eneida de Publius Vergilius Maro, Editura Paideia, București, 2000.
- Homer, Iliad, traducere de Dan Slușanschi, ilustrații de Mihail Coșulețu, Editura Humanitas, București, 2012, ISBN 978-973-50-3702-4
- Homer, Odyssey, tradusă în hexametri de Dan Slușanschi și ilustrată de Alexandru Rădvan, Editura Humanitas, București, 2012, ISBN 978-973-50-3701-7.
- Dimitrie Cantemir, Istoria cresterilor si descresterilor Curtii Otomane, prima traducere româneasca, Editura Paidea, 2008, 2010, 2012.

== See also ==
- Antoaneta Sabău
- Dimitrie Cantemir

== Bibliography ==
Dan Slusanschi – portret de clasicist, edited by Ana-Maria Răducan and Florin George Călian

Nicht jeder Spezialist ist auch ein Intellektueller, Forscher Florin George Călian erzählt von Antoaneta Sabău, der Antike und Dan Slusanschi, by Klaus Philippi
