= John Farmer (composer) =

English composer (about 1570–1601)

John Farmer (c. 1570 – c. 1601) was an important composer of the English Madrigal School. He was born in England during the Elizabethan period, and was also known by his skillful settings for four voices of the old church psalm tunes. His exact date of birth is not known – a 1926 article by Grattan Flood posits a date around 1564 to 1565 based on matriculation records. Farmer was under the patronage of the Earl of Oxford and dedicated his collection of canons and his late madrigal volume to his patron.

In 1595, Farmer was appointed organist and master of children at Christ Church Cathedral, Dublin, and also, at the same time, organist of St Patrick's Cathedral, Dublin. In 1599, he moved to London and published his only collection of four-part madrigals, which he dedicated to Edward de Vere.

His Lord's Prayer is performed widely throughout many churches and cathedrals, mostly in Britain. It is included in Volume 2 of Oxford Choral Classics, published by Oxford University Press.

Giles Farnaby dedicated a pavan to him, included in the Fitzwilliam Virginal Book as Farmer's Paven (no. CCLXXXVII).

Farmer's Divers & Sundry Waies was the source of the fugues in Michael Maier's book, Atalanta Fugiens. Of the 50 three-part fugues in Atalanta Fugiens, 40 have been shown by Ludwig to be based on Farmer's compositions in Divers & Sundry Waies.

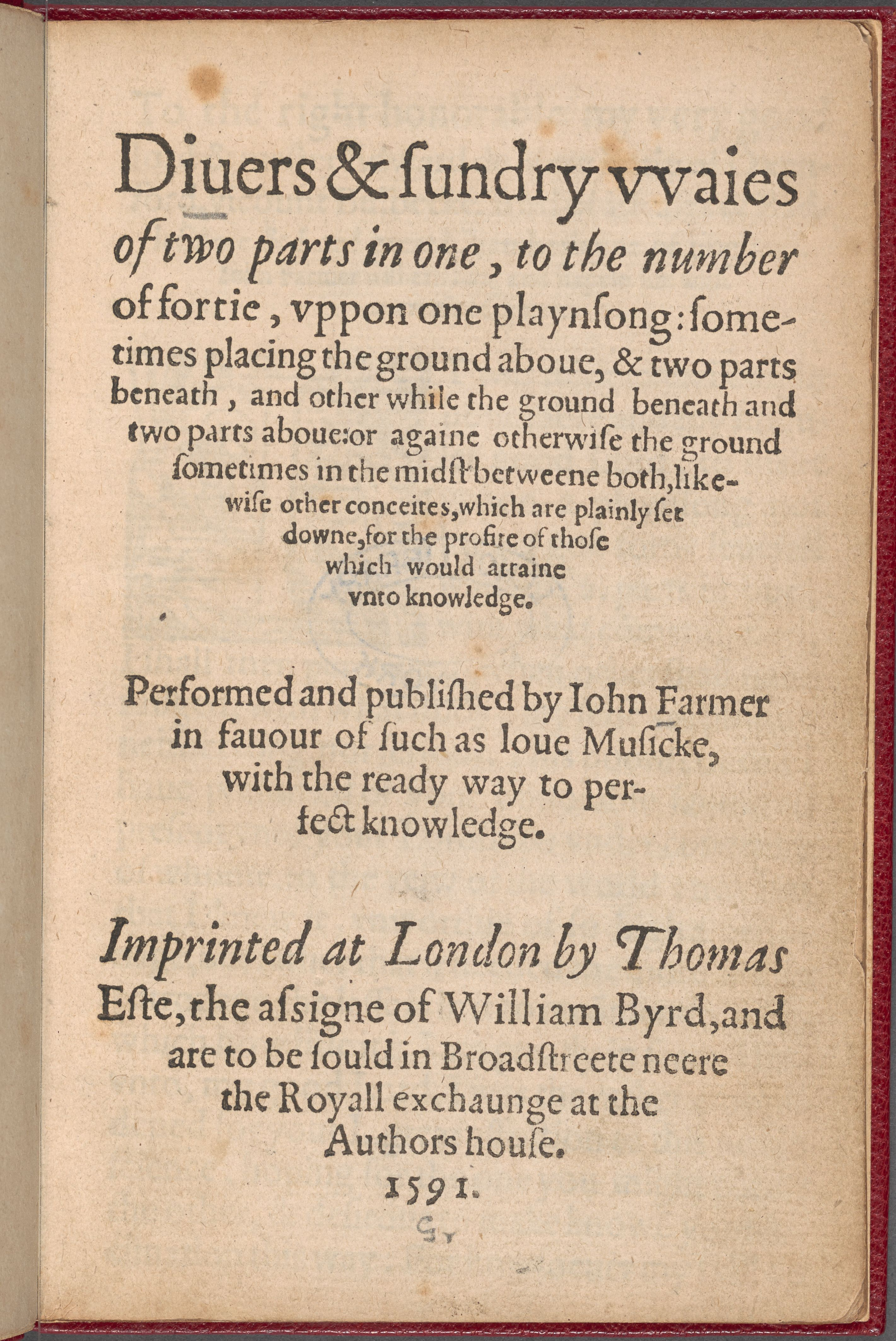
Title page of Farmer's 1591 Divers & Sundry Waies

== Selected works ==
- Fair Phyllis I Saw Sitting All Alone
- Fair Nymphs, I Heard One Telling
- A Little Pretty Bonny Lass
- Take Time While Time Doth Last
