= Atalanta Fugiens =

1617 emblem book by Michael Maier and Matthias Merian

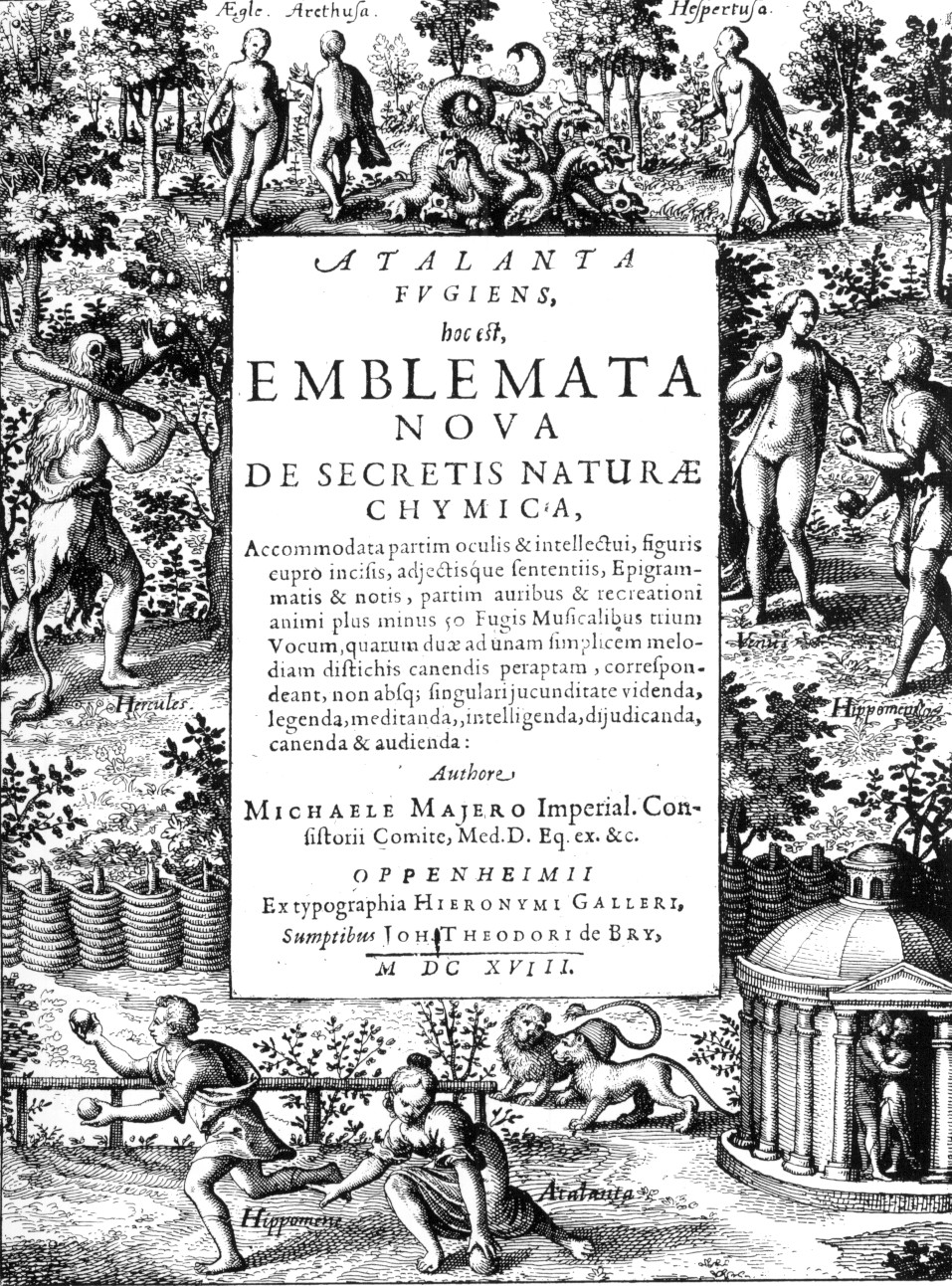
- Title page.
- Author: Michael Maier
- Original title: Atalanta Fugiens, hoc est, Emblemata Nova de Secretis Naturae Chymica, Accommodata partim oculis et intellectui, figuris cupro incisis, adjectisquesententiis, Epigrammatis et notis, partim auribus & recreationi animi plus minus 50 Fugis Musicalibus trium Vocum, quarum duae ad unam simplicem melodiam distichis canendis peraptam, correspondeant, non absq; singulari jucunditate videnda, legenda, meditanda, intelligenda, dijudicanda, canenda et audienda.
- Illustrator: Matthias Merian
- Subject: Alchemy
- Genre: Multimedia
- Published: Oppenheim
- Publisher: Johann Theodor de Bry, printed by Hieronymus Galler
- Publication date: 1617

Atalanta Fugiens or Atalanta Fleeing is an emblem book with an alchemical theme by Michael Maier (1568–1622), published by Johann Theodor de Bry in Oppenheim in 1617 (2nd edition 1618). It consists of 50 discourses with illustrations by Matthias Merian, each of which is accompanied by an epigrammatic verse, prose and a musical fugue. It may therefore be considered an early example of multimedia.

The fugues were arranged in three voices symbolizing the philosopher's stone, the pursuing adept, and obstacles in his way.

Florin G. Calian wrote:

It is the first alchemical Gesamtkunstwerk that comprises music, images, poetry, and prose together in one piece. As is stressed on the frontispiece of the book, all the senses are involved in contact with this treatise: partim oculis et inteflectui... partim auribus et recreationi... videnda, legenda, meditanda, intelligenda, dijudicanda, canenda et audienda. In this respect, Atalanta is a book that requires a rather contemplative exercise.

== Title page ==
The title page depicts various scenes from Greek mythology related to golden apples:

- Top: Garden of the Hesperides.
- Left: Hercules stretching out his arm to seize one of the golden apples.
- Right: Aphrodite handing the golden apples to Hippomenes.
- Bottom: Race between Atalanta and Hippomenes, with Atalanta picking up an apple. Behind them is a temple with lovers embracing each other, while in the background they appear as a lion and lioness.

== Preface ==
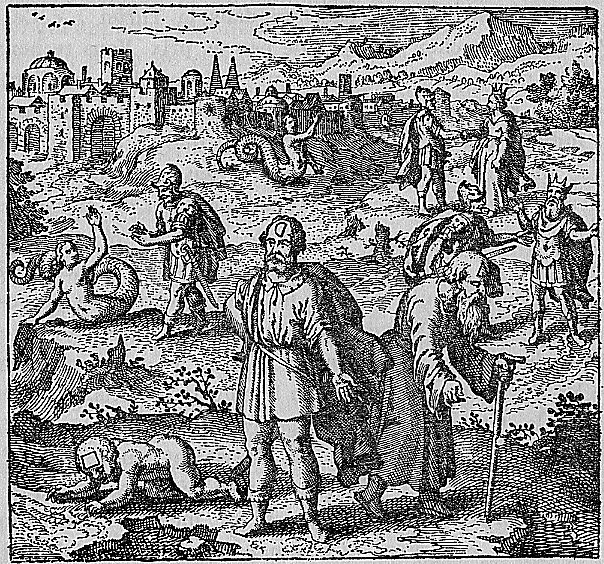
Maier's reinterpretation of the Riddle of the Sphinx as pictured in Emblem 39

The preface contains a dissertation upon ancient music and narrates the Greek myth of Atalanta and Hippomenes.

== Discourses ==
Each of the 50 discourses contains:

- A detailed copper-plated engraving by Matthias Merian.
- An epigram in verse set to music in the form of a fugue for three voices - Atalanta, or the vox fugiens; Hippomenes, or the vox sequens, and Pomum objectum (Apple) or vox morans. "Atalanta fugiens" is a play on the word "fugue" Forty of the fifty fugues are based on compositions by John Farmer
- An epigram in German.
- A Latin verse with an accompanying discourse.
