= Michael Maier =

German physician, alchemist and composer (1568–1622)

Michael Maier Imperial Count Palatine, Eq. Ex. Phil. & Med. D.
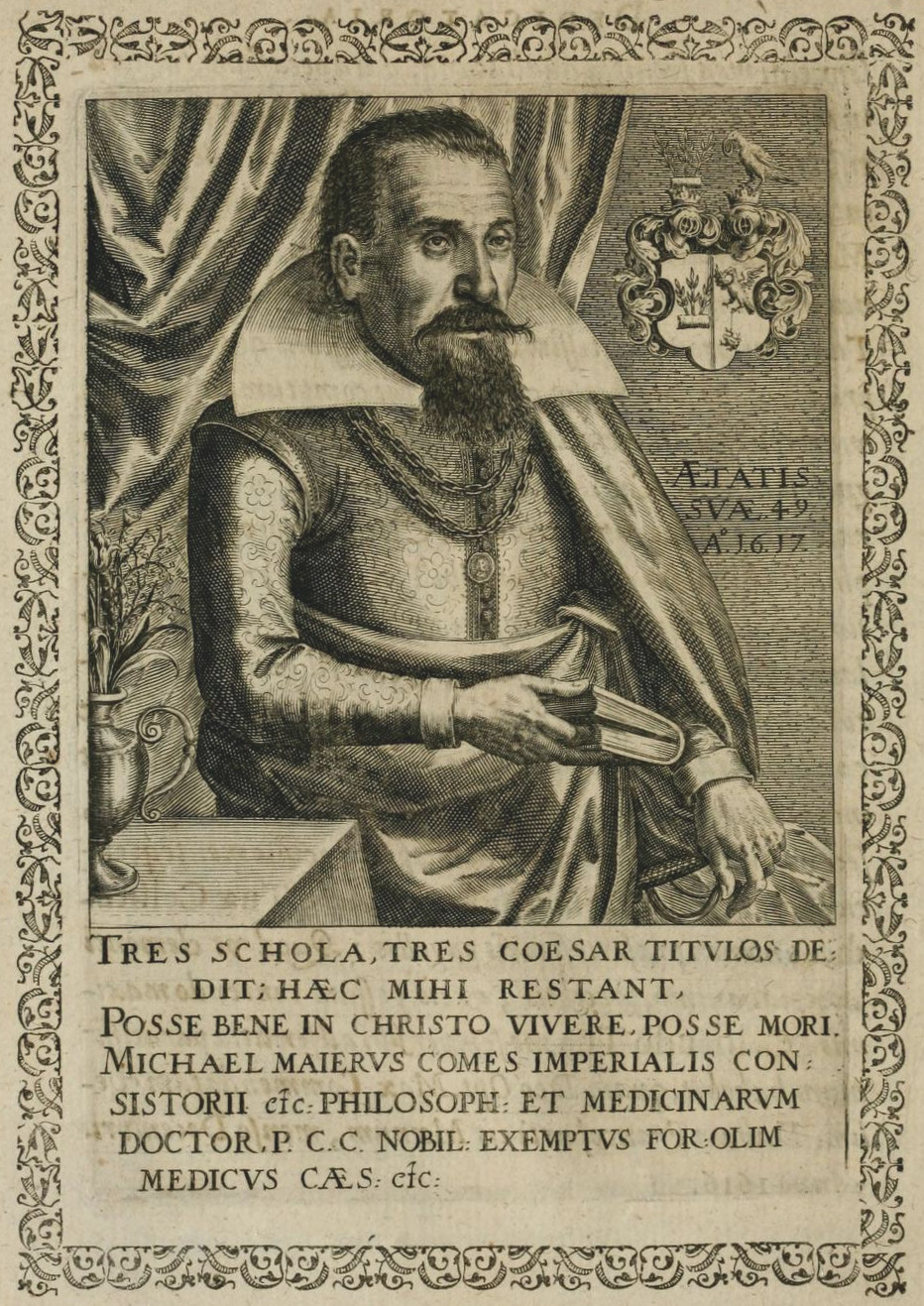
- Copper engraving of Michael Maier, from Symbola avreae mensae dvodecim nationvm (Matthäus Merian, 1617)
- Born: 1568; Rendsburg, Holstein
- Died: 1622 (aged 53–54); Magdeburg
- Other name: Michael Maierus
- Education: University of Basel
- Known for: Atalanta Fugiens
- Scientific career
- Fields: Medicine, alchemy

Michael Maier (Latin: Michael Maierus; 1568–1622) was a German physician and counsellor to Rudolf II Habsburg. He was a learned alchemist, epigramist, and amateur composer.

== Early life ==
Maier was born in Rendsburg, Holstein, the son of a specialist in beadwork in embroidery named Peter Maier. He studied philosophy and medicine at Rostock (1587–1591), Frankfurt (Oder) (M.A. 1592), and Padua (1595–1596). Maier left Padua abruptly after getting involved in a fight, injuring the other party, and being arrested. He went on to the University of Basel, where he attained a doctorate in medicine in October 1596. His doctoral thesis, De epilepsia was dedicated to Matthias Carnarius. Maier then returned to Holstein to practice medicine. Around 1599, he became interested in alchemy and attempted to create an alchemical concordance, synthesizing the works of different authors. For Florian G. Calian, Maier is "an alchemist who over-spiritualized his discipline."

== In the service of Rudolf II (1609–1611) ==
In 1608, he went to Prague, and on 19 September 1609, he formally entered the service of Rudolf II as his physician and imperial counsellor. Ten days later, Rudolf raised him to the hereditary nobility and gave him the title of Imperial Count Palatine. He was granted a coat of arms which depicted a bird, bonded together with a frog by a golden chain. Around this time, Maier published an extremely limited print run of De Medicina Regia et vere Heroica, Coelidonia (1609), including in it his autobiography. The interest of the emperor in the occult was the reason of his high esteem for Maier. However, by April 1611, Rudolf's political position had substantially deteriorated, and he was more or less imprisoned in his castle in Prague. Maier left the city that month. He corresponded with Moritz of Hessen-Kassel, and visited Hessen-Kassel's brother-in-law, Count Ernst III of Holstein-Schauenburg. He was also a guest of Christoph Reinhard, Doctor of Laws and town syndic of Mühlhausen, to whom he later dedicated his book Atalanta Fugiens.

== In England 1611–1616 ==
First Maier visited the Netherlands where he stayed with Petrus Carpenterius in Rotterdam. Petrus Carpenterius had previously been the rector of a Walloon school in Norwich in 1598. From there he continued on to London arriving in 1611 or 1612. Whether he had arrived in person or not by Christmas 1611 is unknown, but he did send Christmas cards to both James I and his son Prince Henry.

He composed a wedding song for the nuptials of Frederick V of the Palatinate to Elizabeth Stuart, daughter of James I. He was in London on 6 November 1612, attending the funeral of Prince Henry in the retinue of Frederick of the Palatinate.

His first well-known book, Arcana arcanissima, was published in London in 1613 or 1614, originally dedicated to the head of the Royal College of Physicians at that time, William Paddy. He also personally dedicated copies to a number of notables, including the Bishop of Ely and Sir Thomas Smith of the East India Company. Other, less notable friends included Francis Anthony.

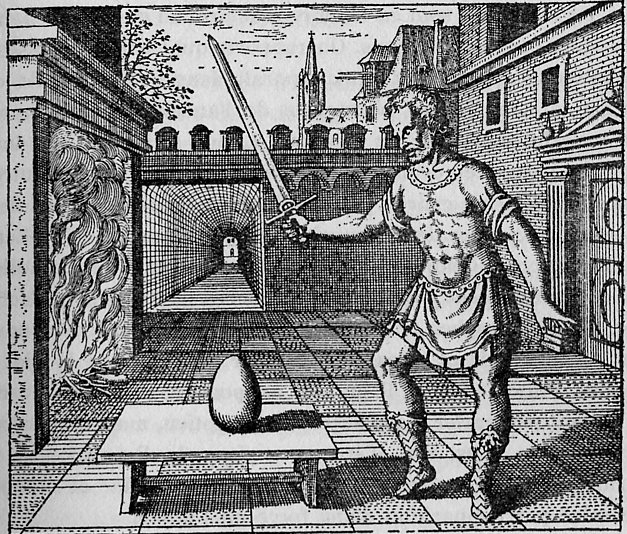
Image taken from the hermetic splendid book Atalanta Fugiens by Michael Maier

Maier returned to Germany in September 1616, settling in Frankfurt am Main. His Atalanta Fugiens, an alchemical emblem book, was published in 1617. Alongside images, poems, and discussion, it included fifty pieces of music in the form of fugues, the form itself being a pun on Atalanta "fleeing". In 1619, Maier became the physician of Landgrave Moritz of Hesse-Kassel (or Hesse-Cassel). In 1620, he moved to Magdeburg to practice medicine, where he died at the age of 54, leaving a noteworthy quantity of unpublished works.

A devout Lutheran all his life, Michael Maier had a strong influence on Sir Isaac Newton. He was also involved in the Rosicrucian movement that appeared around this time, which afforded part of the matter of his Themis aurea.

== Influence ==
The 1656 English translation of Themis Aurea appeared as Themis Aurea: The Laws of the Fraternity of the Rosie Cross, and was dedicated to Elias Ashmole. Under the initials N.L.T.S. and H.S. the dedicators justified their dedication over three pages; they are now identified as Nathaniel Hodges, and Thomas Hodges (either his father or his brother, both of that name). Ashmole, they said, began to learn seal engraving, casting in sand, and goldsmith's work when living in Blackfriars, London, at which time he was initiated into Rosicrucian "secrets" by William Backhouse of Swallowfield in Berkshire. While illustrating the chain of Rosie Cross links from Michael Maier and Robert Fludd, via Backhouse to Ashmole, the details given about Ashmole's training as a craftsman could illustrate the background of the latter's acception in operative masonry.

James Brown Craven, who gave detailed descriptions of the works above in his catalogue raisonné (1910) of Michael Maier, also included the 1654 English translation of Lusus Serius: or, Serious Passtime. A Philosophical Discourse ...wherein Hermes or Mercury is declared King of all Worldly things. The copy from the Bodleian Library described by Craven was dedicated "To the Honourable Cary Dillon, Esq., Son to Robert, late Earle of Roscommon by J. de la Salle" [i.e., John Hall of Durham]. This is a fair example of the intellectual circle in which Maier's work circulated contemporary with the association of Rosie Cross with Elias Ashmole.

== Works ==
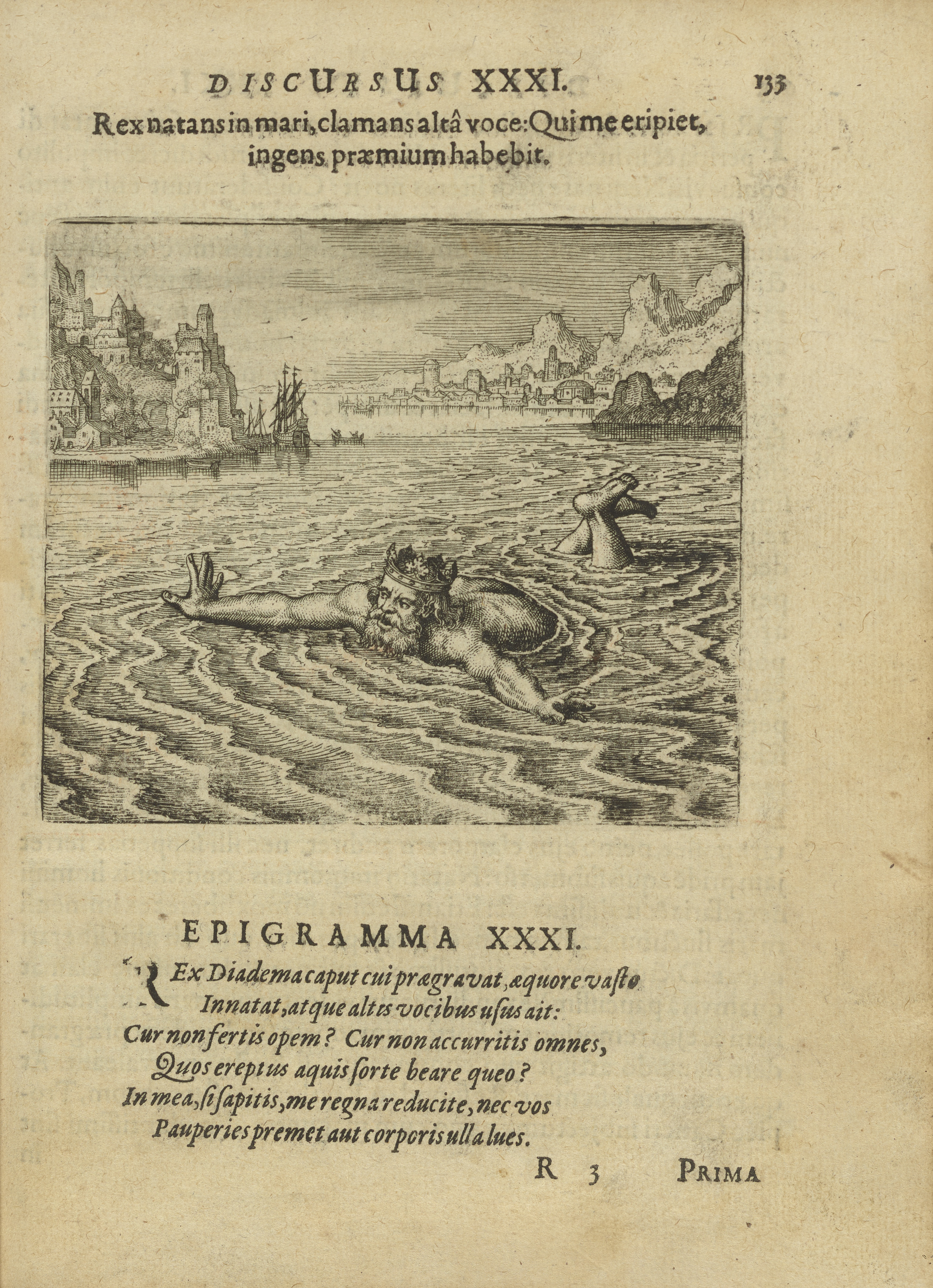
Discursus XXXI, Epigramma XXXI, from Atalanta fugiens, 1617

- De Medicina Regia et vere heroica, Coelidonia. 1609.
- Hymnosophia.
- Arcana arcanissima, hoc est, Hieroglyphica Ægyptio-Graeca: vulgo necdum cognita, ad demonstrandam falsorum apud antiquos deorum, dearum, heroum, animantium, et institutorum pro sacris receptorum, originem, ex uno Ægyptiorum artificio, quad aureum animi et Corporis medicamentum peregit, deductam: unde tot poetarum allegoriae, scriptorum narrationes fabulosae et per totam encyclopaediam errores sparsi clarissima veritatis luce manifestantur, suaque tribui singula restituuntur, sex libris exposita. London: Creede, 1614.
- De Circulo physico, quadrato: Hoc est, de Auro ejusque virtute medicinali, sub duro cortice instar nuclei latente, an et qualis inde petenda sit tractatus haut inutilis. Oppenheim: Lucas Jennis, 1616.
- Lusus Serius. Oppenheim, 1616.
- Silentium Post Clamores, 1617.
- Symbola aureae mensae duodecim nationum, hoc est Hermaea seu Mercurii festa ab heroibus duodenis selectis, artis chymicae usu, sapientia et authoritate paribus celebrata, ad Pyrgopolynicen seu adversarium illum tot annis jactabundum, virgini Chemiae injuriam argumentis tam vitiosis quam convitiis argutis inferentem, confundendum et exarmandum, artifices vero optime de ea meritos suo honori et famae restituendum. Frankfurt a. M: Lucas Jennis, 1617.
- Atalanta Fugiens. Oppenheim, Johann Theodori de Bry, 1617.
- Examen Fucorum Pseudo-Chymicorum. 1617.
- Jocus Severus. Frankfurt, 1617.
- Tripus Aureus, Frankfurt, 1618.
- Viatorium. Frankfurt, 1618.
- Themis Aurea, hoc est, de Legibus Fraternitatis R. C. tractatus, quo earum cum rei veritate convenientia, utilitas publica et privata, nec non causa necessaria, evoluntur et demonstrantur. 1618.
- Tractus de Volugri Arborea. 1619.
- Verum Inventum. 1619.
- Septimana Philosophica: Qua Aenigmata Aureola de omni Naturae genere a Solomone Israelitarum Sapientissimo Rege, et Arabiae Regina Saba, nec non Hyramo, Tyri Principe, sibi invicem in modum Colloquii proponuntur et enodatur, 1620.
- Civitas Corporis Humani. 1621.
- Cantilenae Intelectuales de Phoenice Redivivo; or Chansons Intelectuelles sur la resurection Du Phenix. 1622.
- Ulysses. Sapientia seu intelligentia, tanquam coelestis scintilla beatitudinis, quod si in fortunae et corporis bonis naufragium faciat, ad portum meditationis et patientiae remingio feliciter se expediat. 1624. (Posthumous)

== Gallery ==
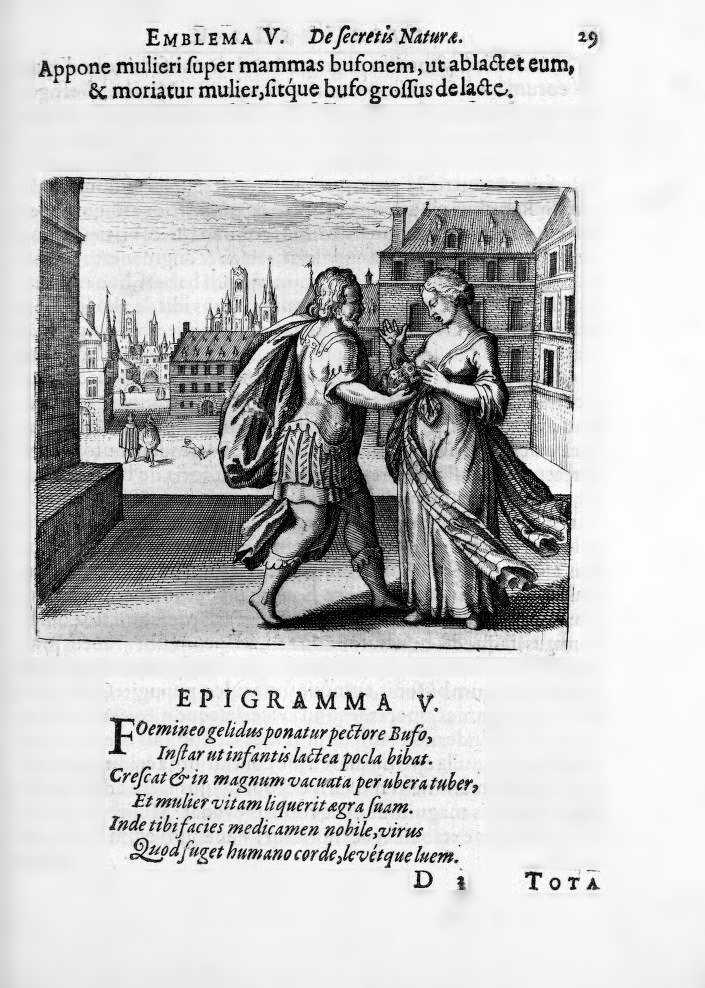
Toad on a Bosom - Atalanta Fugiens, 1618

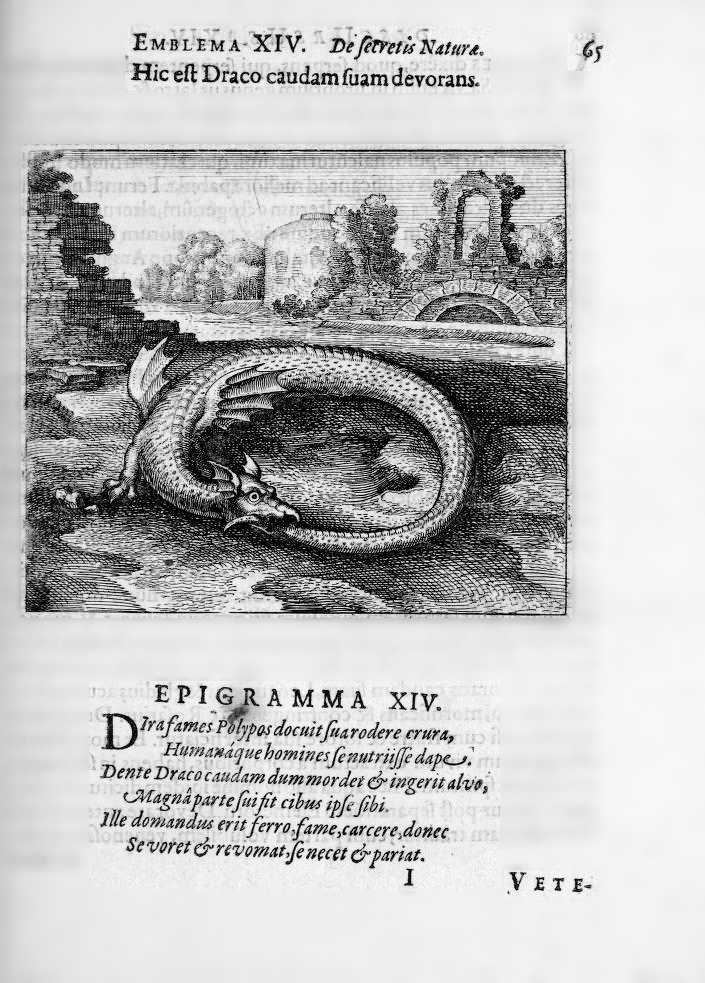
Ouroboros - Atalanta Fugiens, 1618

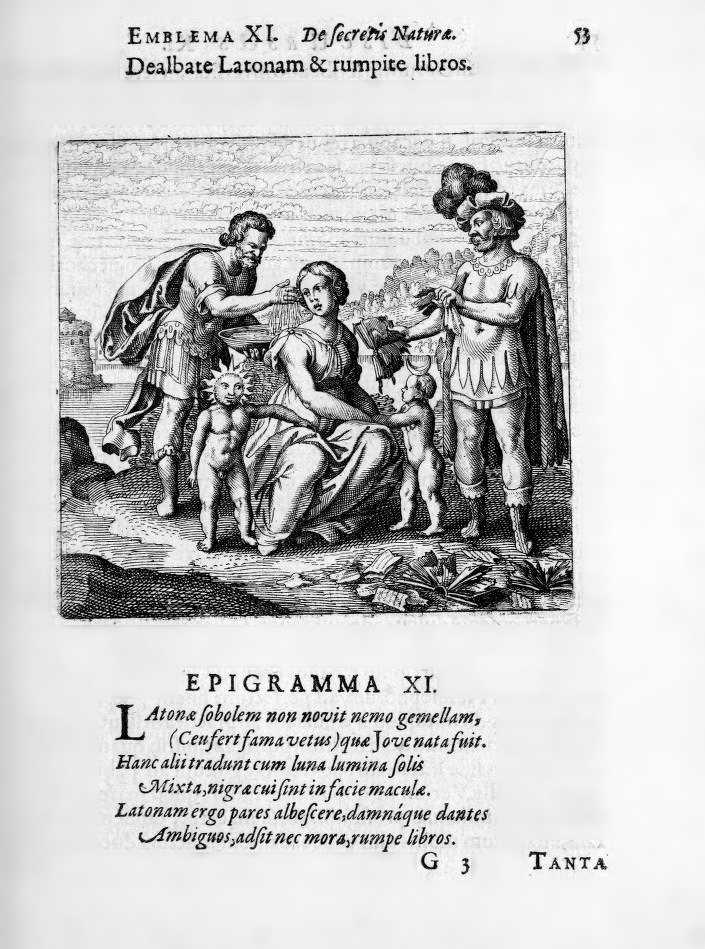
Latona - Atalanta Fugiens, 1618

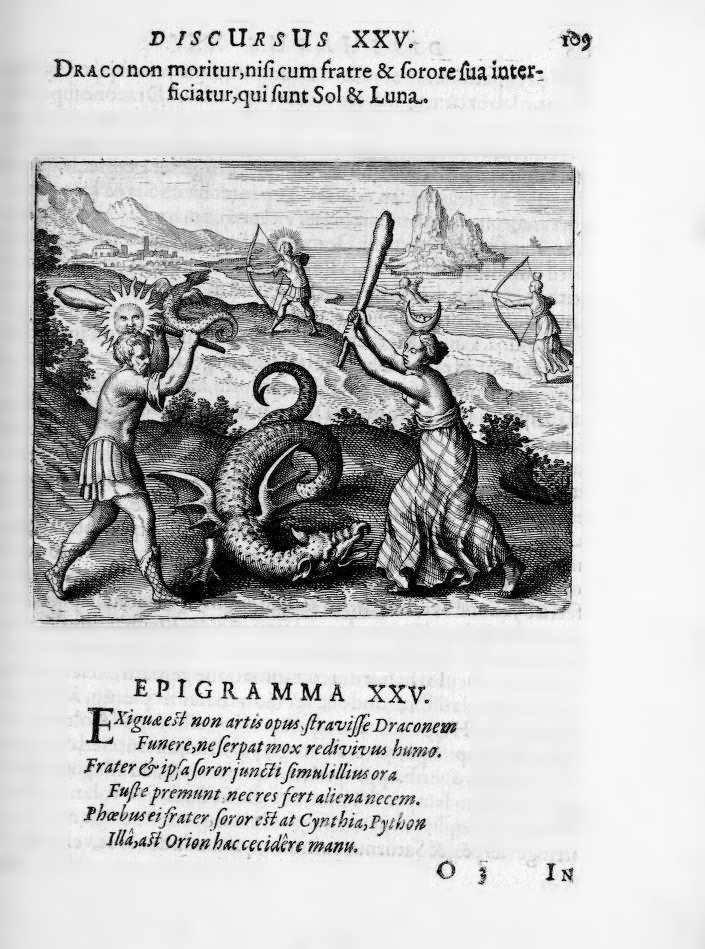
Dragon slay - Atalanta Fugiens, 1618

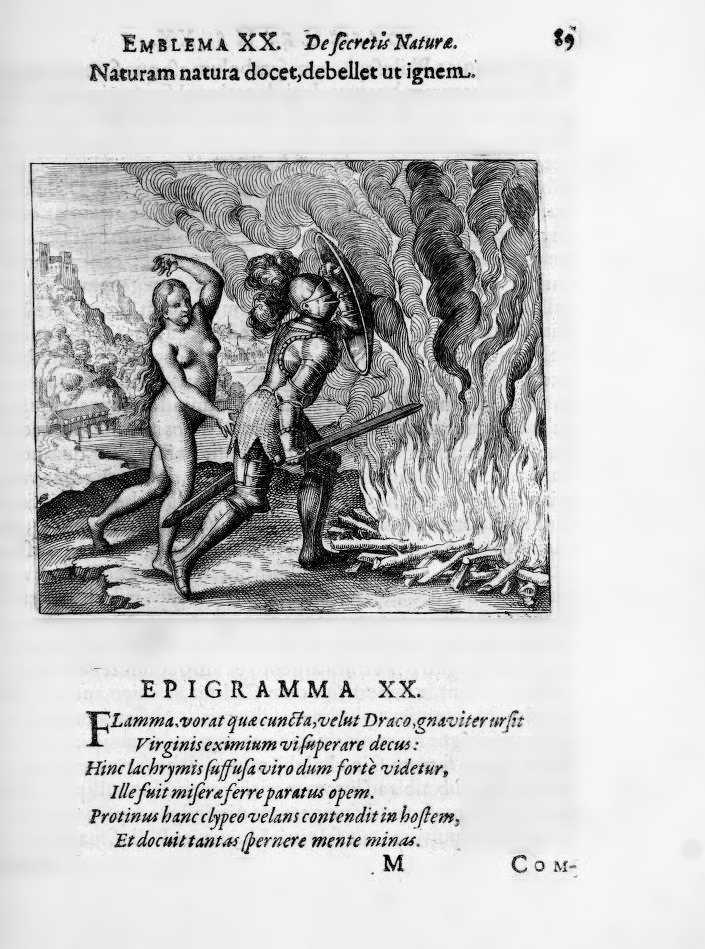
Fire fight - Atalanta Fugiens, 1618

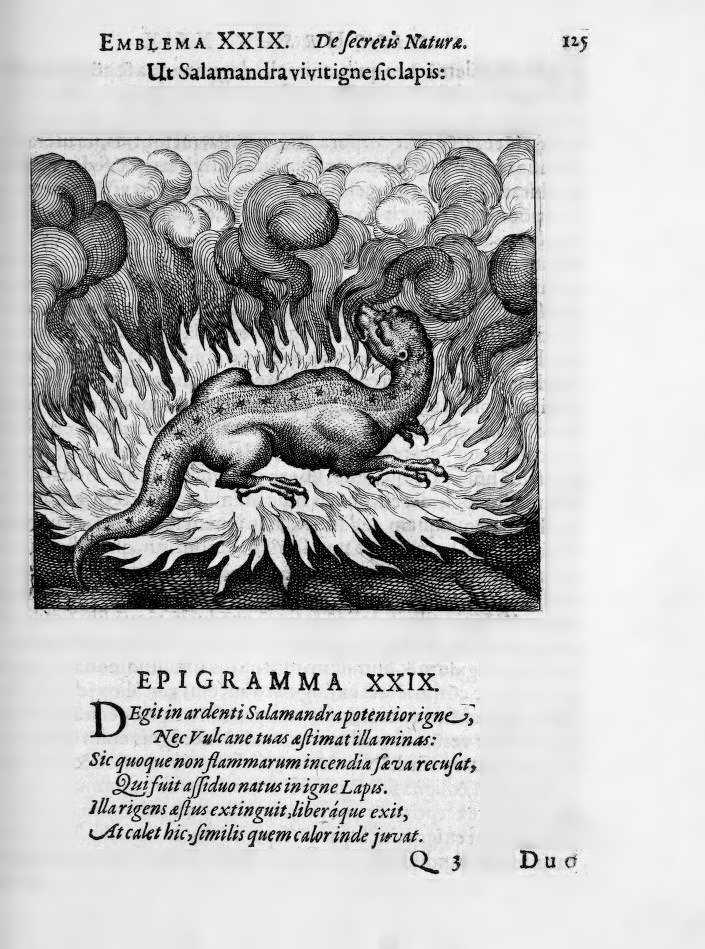
Salamander - Atalanta Fugiens, 1618

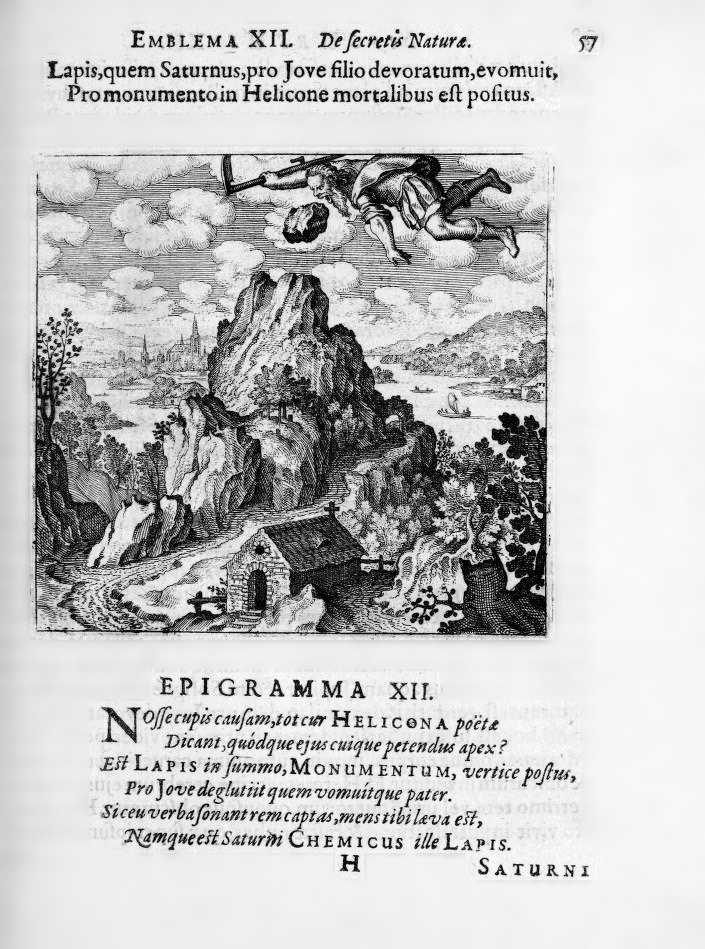
Helicon monument - Atalanta Fugiens, 1618

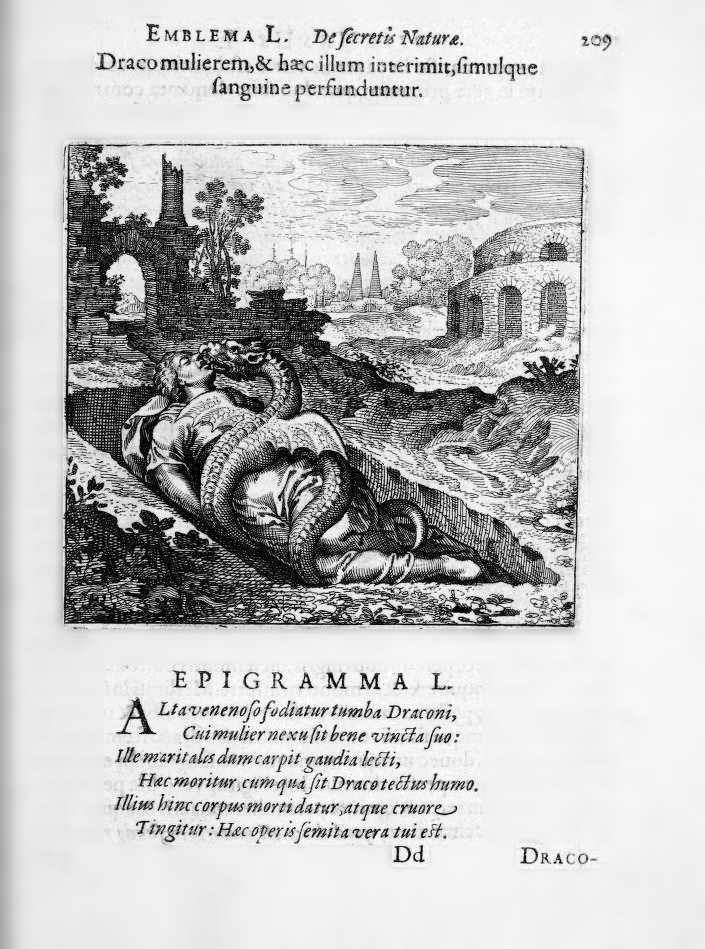
Dragon death - Atalanta Fugiens, 1618
