= John Mooney (historian) =

Scottish historian

- Born: 1862; Orkney, Scotland
- Died: 1950 (aged 87–88)
- Citizenship: British
- Occupations: Historian, writer
- Children: Harold Mooney
- Writing career
- Subject: Orkney history
- Notable works: St Magnus, Earl of Orkney

John Mooney (1862–1950) was a Scottish historian. He was a founder of the Orkney Antiquarian Society.

== Biography ==
Mooney was born in Orkney. During his lifetime he was the director of R. Garden Ltd, and was also a Kirkwall Town Councillor.

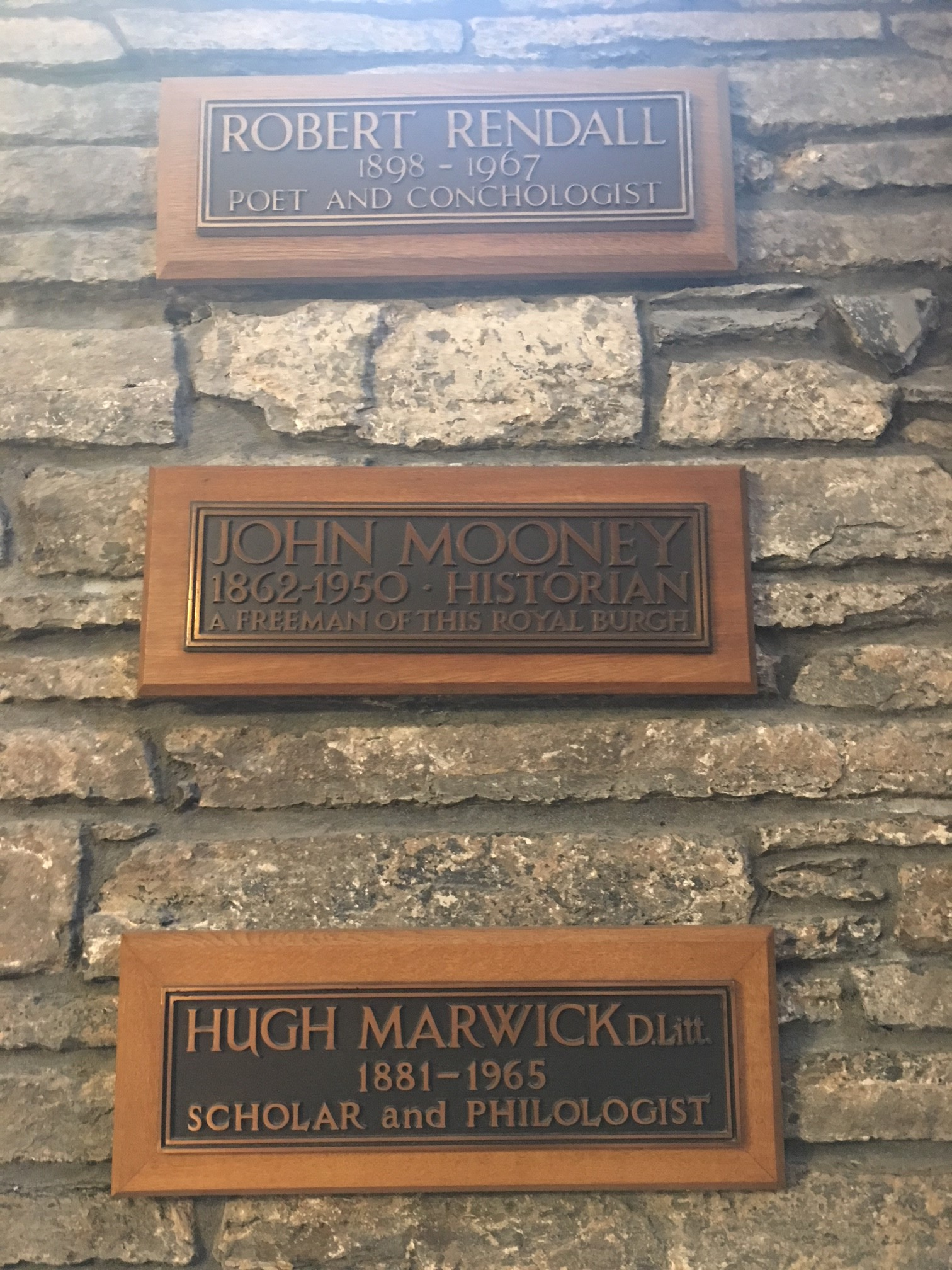
Memorial to John Mooney in Kirkwall Cathedral, Orkney

== Bibliography ==
Eynhallow: The Holy Island of The Orkneys
St Magnus, Earl of Orkney
The Cathedral and Royal Burgh of Kirkwall
