= Septimana Philosophica =

1620 alchemical book by Michael Maier

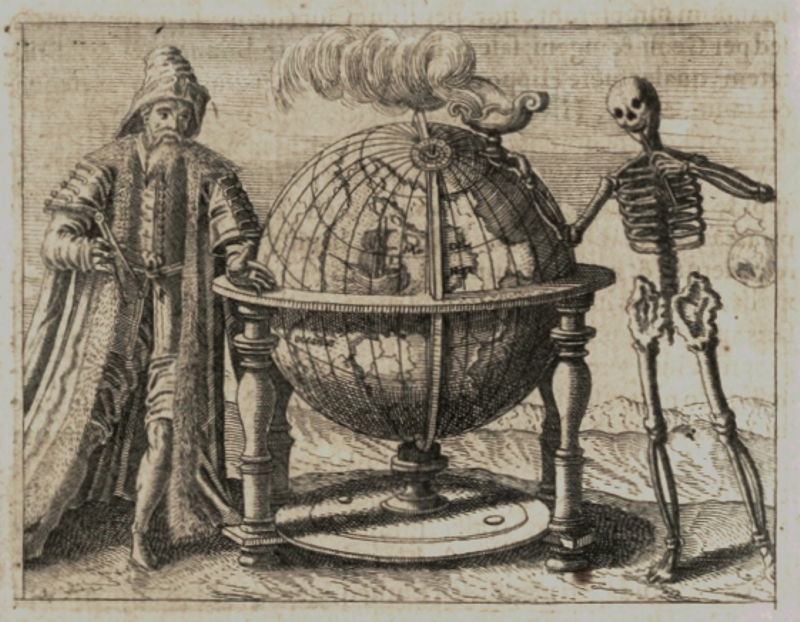
Engraving from a chapter of Septimana Philosophica. Day six: Man.

Septimana Philosophica or The Philosophical Week is an alchemical book written by Michael Maier. It was published by Lucas Jennis in 1620 in Frankfurt and printed by Hartmann Palthenius. The title page was engraved by Balthasar Schwan. The full title of the book is Septimana Philosophica: Qua Aenigmata Aureola de omni Naturae genere a Solomone Israelitarum Sapientissimo Rege, et Arabiae Regina Saba, nec non Hyramo, Tyri Principe, sibi invicem in modum Colloquii proponuntur et enodatur.

Salomon, Sheba, and Hiram of Tyre discuss the secrets of the universe. Over six days of the week, the seventh being Sabbath day, they investigate the nature of the universe from mineral to man. Under Vegetable Life the Rose is described. White and Red, the colours for Silver and Gold: "The center of the Rose is green- an emblem of the green Lion which philosophers know well." The conference on man is illustrated with a print representing a globe in a frame, supported on the one side by a masculine figure with a compass, on the other by a skeleton holding a vase with smoking contents.
