= Lusus Serius =

1616 book by Michael Maier

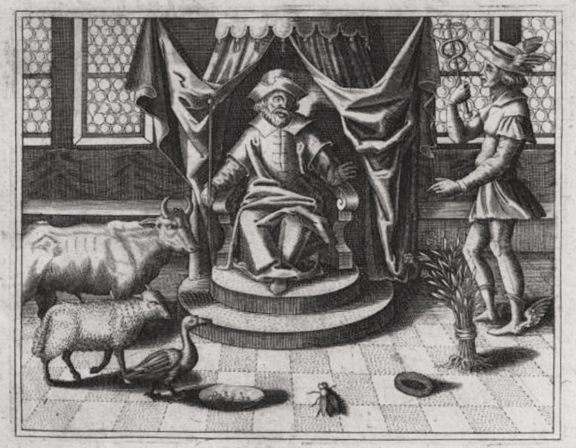
Title page illustration.

Lusus Serius or Serious Pastime is a book written by Michael Maier and published in Oppenheim in 1616. It tells the story of eight representatives from the animal, vegetable, and mineral kingdoms, competing to prove that they are the most useful to mankind.

== Synopsis ==
A calf, sheep, goose, oyster, bee, silkworm, flax, and Mercury participate in the contest judged by man. Each of the book's chapters is a dialog in which a representative pleads his case to the judge. The last, and longest case is made by Mercury. In the final chapter, the judge crowns Mercury "king of all worldly things being under the command of man".

== History ==
Lusus Serius was first published in Latin by Lucas Jennis in 1616.

The full name of the work in Latin is Lusus Serius, Quo Hermes sive Mercurius Rex Mundanorum omnium sub homine existentium, post longam disceptationem in Concilio Octovirali habitam, homine rationali arbitro, judicatus et constituts est. The original was dedicated to Francis Anthony, of London, Jacobus Mosanua and Cristianus Rumphius. The dedication was written in September 1616, "having returned from England, on my way from Prague".

An English translation was published in London in 1654 as Lusus Serius, or Serious Passe-time. A Philosophical Discourse concerning the Superiority of Creatures under Man. It is the first book of Maier's to have been published in English. The translation by "J. de la Salle" was printed for Humphrey Moseley and dedicated to Cary Dillon. J. de la Salle is a pseudonym of John Hall (poet).
