= Fair Phyllis =

1599 English madrigal by John Farmer

- by John Farmer
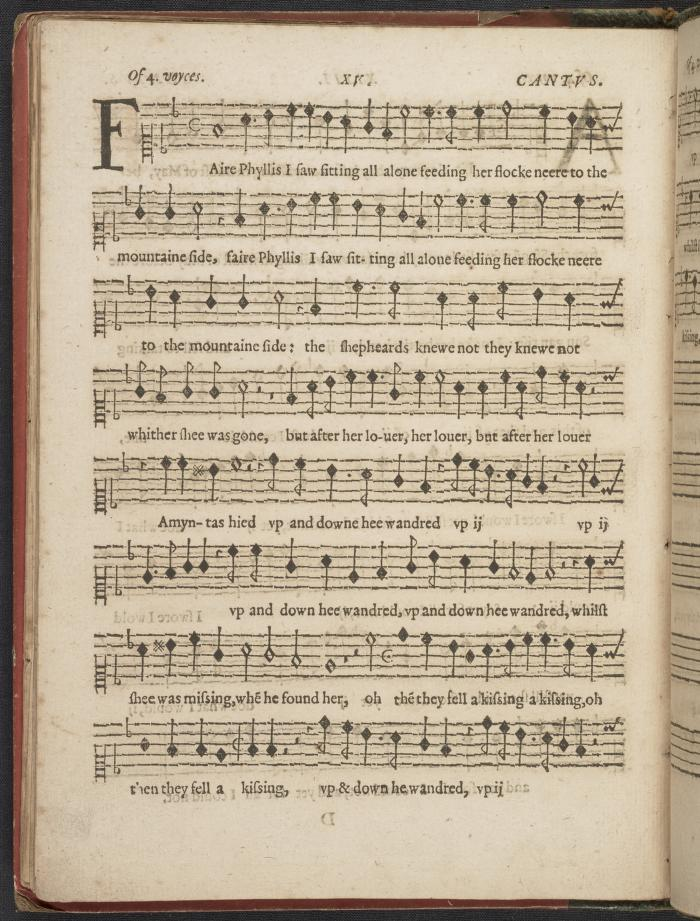
- Cantus part of Fair Phyllis published in 1599
- Key: F major
- Period: Renaissance
- Genre: Madrigal
- Published: 1599
- Publisher: William Barley
- Duration: 1:18 (The King's Singers recording)
- Scoring: SATB ensemble

Fair Phyllis (also Faire Phyllis, Fair Phyllis I saw, Fair Phyllis I saw sitting all alone) is a jocular four-part English madrigal by John Farmer that was published in 1599 by William Barley in a collection entitled The First Set of English Madrigals to Four Voices. Farmer dedicated the collection to his patron, Edward de Vere, 17th Earl of Oxford.

The piece is known for its lighthearted pastoral text, lively rhythms, and use of word painting. It remains a popular madrigal and is often sung by college or high school choruses. The short work typically takes between one and two minutes to perform.

== Background and narrative ==
Phyllis and Amyntas, the central figures in the madrigal, would have been familiar to Farmer's Elizabethan audience, having become synonymous with shepherds and shepherdesses in a pastoral setting. Characters with their names could be found in ancient literature, such as the Eclogues of Virgil, where they appear in an Arcadian landscape. English writers of the day had, in turn, adapted Phyllis and Amyntas as stock pastoral characters. They appeared in numerous works including Edmund Spenser's The Shepheardes Calender (1579) and Thomas Watson’s Amyntas (1582).

A testament to the popularity of the Phyllis and Amyntas characters is how many composers included them in madrigals. They can be found in works by Thomas Morley ("Phyllis I Fain Would Die Now"), Francis Pilkington ("Amyntas with His Phyllis Fair"), and Thomas Weelkes ("Sit Down and Sing Amintas' Joys" and "My Phyllis Bids Me Pack Away").

The text of "Fair Phyllis" presents a brief mock-pastoral narrative that playfully engages with traditional pastoral themes. In this madrigal, the shepherdess Phyllis is depicted sitting alone and feeding her flock near a mountainside. None of the other shepherds knows where she is, but her lover, Amyntas, scurries "up and down" in search of her until he eventually finds her, leading to a lusty reunion.

== Structure, text, and musical devices ==
Section	Text	Meter	Texture
A (Repeated)	Fair Phyllis I saw sitting all alone, Feeding her flock near to the mountainside.	Duple meter Mixed duple and triple meter	Monophonic; Homophonic
B	The shepherds knew not whither she was gone, But after her lover Amyntas hied.*	Duple meter (Both lines)	Polyphonic (Both lines)
C (Repeated)	Up and down he wandered whilst she was missing; When he found her, O, then they fell a-kissing.	Duple meter Duple then triple meter	Polyphonic; Homophonic

*hied = hastened, hurried

The anonymous poem that Farmer set to music is a sestain with a rhyming scheme of ABABCC. English part song publications provide no attributions for the texts. As a result, the poets or translators for most Elizabethan part songs, including this madrigal, remain unknown and are possibly the composers.

Fair Phyllis performed by the Collegium Vocale Bydgoszcz.

"Fair Phyllis" follows an AABCC musical form commonly found in Italian canzonettas, which are known for their lightness of mood and rhythmic character. Farmer employs word painting throughout the madrigal to musically illustrate the jovial narrative. For example, the opening line, "Fair Phyllis I saw sitting all alone," is set monophonically, reflecting her solitude. The subsequent line, "Feeding her flock near to the mountainside," transitions to a homophonic texture, with all voices singing together, symbolizing the presence of her flock.

Beginning the B section, the phrase "The shepherds knew not whither she was gone," sung in imitative polyphony, creates a marked contrast with the A section and sets the scene for Amyntas's hurried search. In the C section, the urgency of Amyntas's search is amplified by the cascading and overlapping lines of "Up and down he wandered," as each voice enters in succession, providing a sense of movement.

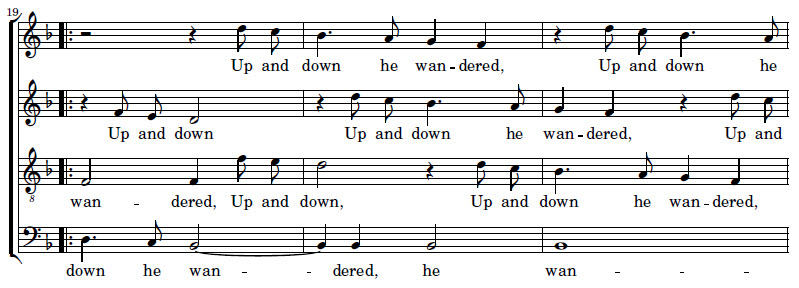
Word painting of the text "Up and down he wandered" using imitative polyphony

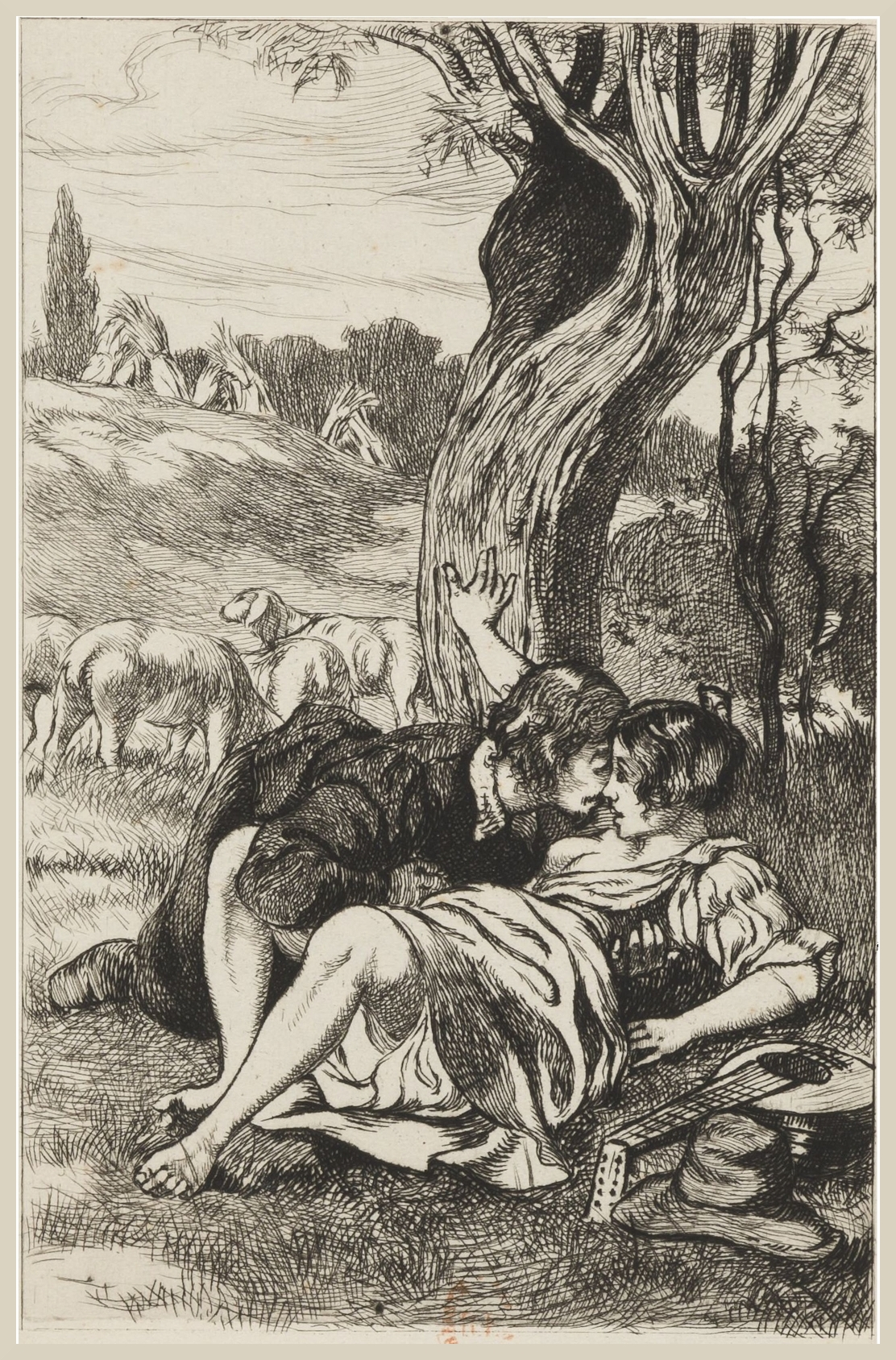
Etching of lovers in a pastoral setting by Martin van Maele

Notably, the C section is repeated, causing the phrase "Up and down he wandered" to occur immediately after "O then they fell a-kissing." This introduces a bawdy double entendre, shifting the meaning from Amyntas's search in the hills to foreplay. Additionally, Farmer shifts to triple meter in the phrase "O then they fell a-kissing," sung homophonically, which lends it a rhythmic, lilting quality that enhances the playful eroticism of the moment.

== In popular culture ==
The madrigal was featured in the episode Death in Chorus of the British detective drama Midsomer Murders.

The madrigal also served as loose inspiration for the 2003 animated short film Fair Phyllis, directed by Beth Portman for the National Film Board of Canada.
