= Robert Hegge =

English academic and antiquary

Robert Hegge (1599–1629) was an English academic and antiquary.

== Life ==
Born at Durham in 1599, he was the son of Stephen Hegge, notary public there, by Anne, daughter of Robert Swyft, LL.D., prebendary of Durham. On 7 November 1614, he was admitted scholar of Corpus Christi College, and graduated B.A. on 13 February 1617 and M.A. on 17 March 1620. He was elected probationer fellow of his college on 27 December 1624, but died suddenly on 11 June 1629, and was buried in Corpus Christi Chapel.

== Works ==
Hegge wrote a ‘Treatise of Dials and Dialling,’ preserved in the college library, to which he also presented a manuscript of Augustine of Hippo's De Civitate Dei. Another treatise from his pen, entitled In aliquot Sacræ Paginæ loca lectiones, was published at London in 1647 by John Hall.

A third treatise by Hegge, entitled Saint Cvthbert; or the Histories of his Chvrches at Lindisfarne, Cvncacestre, and Dvnholme, was written in 1625 and 1626. Richard Baddeley, private secretary to Thomas Morton, bishop of Durham, printed an edition of it from a copy in Lord Fairfax's library, and suppressed the name of the author; he called it ‘The Legend of St. Cvthbert, with the Antiquities of the Church of Durham. By B. R., Esq.,’ London, 1663. A very correct edition was printed in quarto by George Allan at his press in Darlington in 1777, and another by John Brough Taylor, at Sunderland in 1816. Taylor's edition is printed from a manuscript, probably the author's autograph, which belonged to Frevile Lambton of Hardwick.

== See also ==
- N-Town Plays, known as the Hegge cycle.
