= Hugh Marwick =

Hugh Marwick OBE FSA Scot (30 November 1881 in Rousay, Orkney, Scotland – 21 May 1965 in Kirkwall) was a Scottish scholar noted for his research on the Orkney Norn.

His MA was from the University of Edinburgh, who awarded his D.Litt. in 1926 after he had worked many years on his doctoral thesis, the basis for his book The Orkney Norn. While researching and writing, he was also headmaster of Kirkwall Grammar School (then called the Burgh School).He was appointed in 1914 after some years teaching in Lancashire, and continued as headmaster until 1929, when he was made director of the Orkney Education Committee, a post he held until 1946.

Dr Marwick was one of the founders of the Orkney Antiquarian Society in 1922 with fellow Orcadian and Norse enthusiast John Mooney JP, FSA (Scot) and was its secretary for 17 years, during which he contributed papers to its Proceedings. He was also a Fellow of the Society of Antiquaries of Scotland.

He was appointed an Officer of the Order of the British Empire in 1965.

In 2011, original pages of The Orkney Norn were found while clearing out a storeroom in Kirkwall. The pages were put up for sale in 2016 with a predicted sale price of £3000. It was reported that funds from the sale of the pages would be donated to the Royal National Lifeboat Institute.

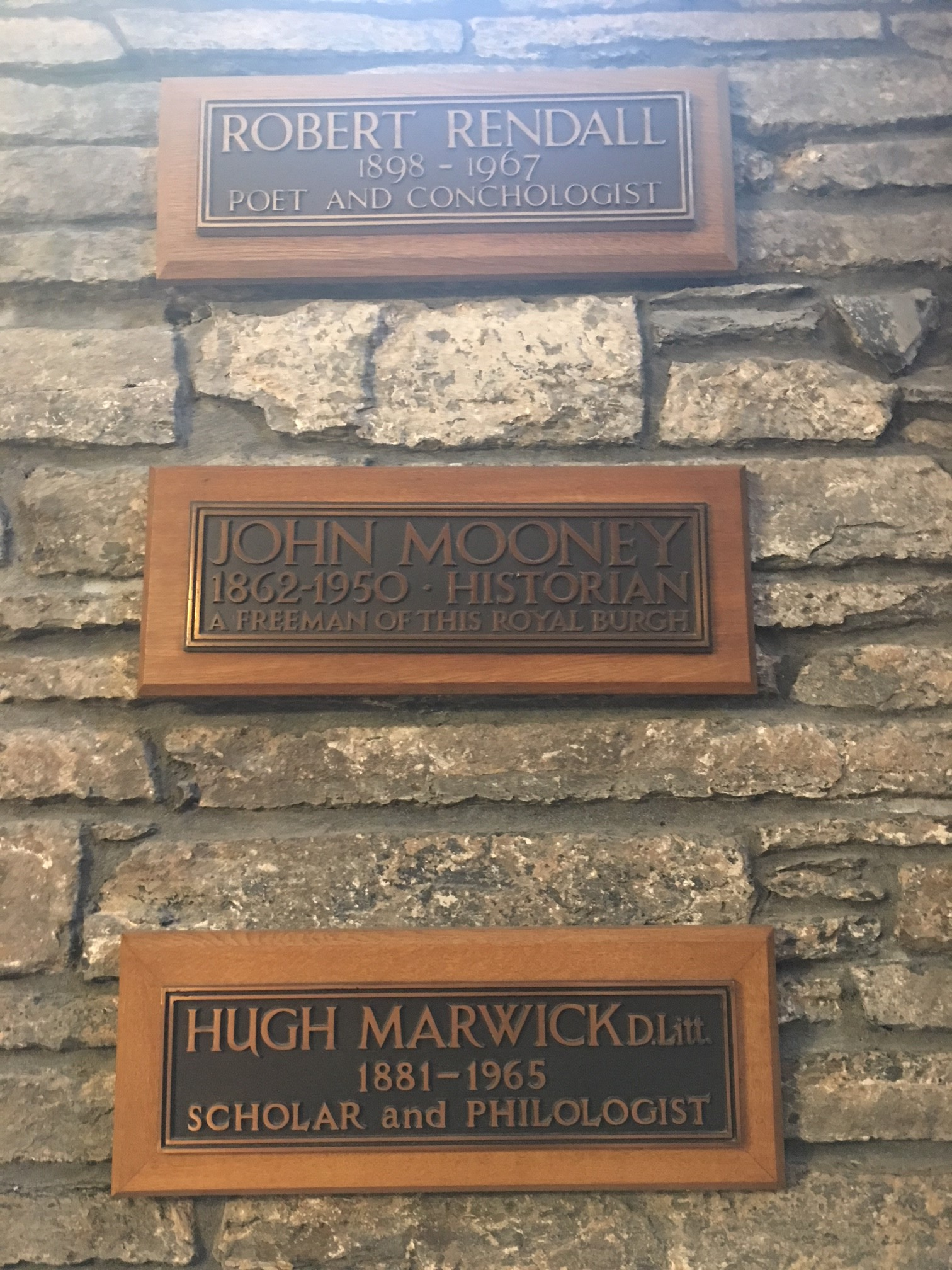
Memorial to Hugh Marwick in Kirkwall Cathedral, Orkney

== Works ==
- The Orkney Norn (1926 University of Edinburgh D.Litt. Thesis, 1929 Oxford University Press)
- The Place Names of Rousay (1947)
- Orkney (1951)
- Orkney Farm-Names (1952)
