= Orkney Antiquarian Society =

The Orkney Antiquarian Society was founded in 1922 by Dr. Hugh Marwick, Archdeacon James Brown Craven, Joseph Storer Clouston and John Mooney, and continued in existence for 17 years. Its focus of interest was the history and archaeology of Orkney, in Scotland, in the United Kingdom.

During its lifetime, the Society published 15 volumes of Proceedings, the last being in 1939.

An Orkney Research Agenda commissioned by Historic Scotland describes the society's founding in 1922 as a "major advance" in Orkney archaeology which provided a "vital outlet for discoveries and research in Orkney". Early 20th century writing on the islands often emphasised their distinct character and Nordic elements in their history, and this influenced subsequent scholarly thought. However, work exploring "Orkneyness" or "Norseness" varied from "excellent" to "suspect" and must be "used critically". Articles from the society's Proceedings are regularly cited by modern writers on archaeology and historical linguistics.

Members of the society could be on site shortly after an accidental discovery, observing, advising and recording, and finds were sometimes given to the society for their own museum in Kirkwall. The society had links with other learned societies in Scotland and Scandinavia. It came to an end with the beginning of World War II, although its name is on some of Marwick's post-war notes about finds made after 1939.

Orkney Miscellany, started in 1953, was the successor to the Proceedings of the Antiquarian Society.

== Society officers ==
Presidents:

1922 – 1924 James Brown Craven
1924 – 1941 Joseph Storer Clouston

Secretary:

1922 – 1941 Hugh Marwick

== See also ==
- List of Antiquarian Societies
