= John Davies (translator) =

Welsh translator and writer (1625–1693)

John Davies (25 May 1625 – 1693) was a Welsh translator and writer.

Davies was born in Kidwelly in Carmarthenshire, Wales and was educated in Carmarthen before entering Jesus College, Oxford in 1641. He moved to St John's College, Cambridge in 1646, during the English Civil War, and met the poet John Hall, later writing a preface to Hall's book of essays. Davies acquired through Hall a Latin manuscript of The Ancient Rites, and Monuments of the Monastical, Cathedral Church of Durham; he proceeded to translate this and it was published in 1672, dedicated to James Mickleton of Durham. Davies learned French during his years abroad; on his return, after the Restoration, he wrote The civil warres of Great Britain and Ireland: containing an exact history of their occasion, originall, progress, and happy end (1661, Scottish edition 1664). He translated various works from French, Spanish and Latin, some being practical works, others being novels and histories. He was buried in the church in Kidwelly on 22 July 1693.
