= John Quarles =

English poet

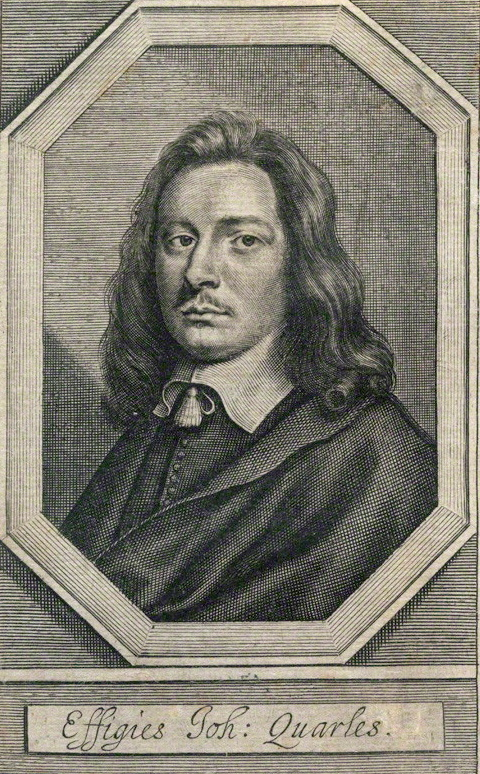
- Born: c. 1624; Essex, England
- Died: 1665 (aged 40–41)
- Education: Exeter College, Oxford
- Occupation: poet
- Father: Francis Quarles

John Quarles (1624 or 1625 – 1665) was an English poet.

== Life ==
One of the eighteen children of Francis Quarles and Ursula Woodgate, Quarles may have been born in Essex in 1624. He was educated under the care of Archbishop James Ussher. Quarles matriculated at Exeter College, Oxford, on 9 February 1643, but does not seem to have taken a degree.

During the English Civil War, Quarles joined the Royalist cause and served as a soldier at the garrison at Oxford, England. After the Parliamentarian victory, Quarles was first imprisoned and later banished from England. While in banishment in Flanders he wrote the poems contained in his first published volume, Fons Lachrymarum.

Quarles was back in England in 1648, but his "occasions beyond sea" compelled him to leave again in 1649. The date of his final return to England is unknown.

Towards the end of his life Quarles became impoverished, surviving off his literary work. In 1665, he died during the Great Plague of London.

== Works ==
The published works of Quarles are:

- Fons Lachrymarum, or a Fountain of Tears; from whence flow England's Complaint, Jeremiahs Lamentations paraphras'd, with Divine Meditations. And an Elegy upon that Son of Valor, Sir Charles Lucas, London, 1648; reprinted 1649, 1655, 1677.
- Regale Lectum Miseriæ, or a Kingly Bed of Miserie. In which is contained a Dreame; with an Elegy upon the Martyrdome of Charles, late King of England. … And another upon … Lord Capel. With a Curse against the Enemies of Peace, and the Authors Farewell to England, London, 1648; reprinted 1649, 1658, 1659, 1660, 1679.
- Gods Love and Mans Unworthiness, London, 1651; reprinted, with Divine Meditations, 1655.
- The Tyranny of the Dutch against the English. … And likewise the Sufferings and Losses of Abraham Woofe … and others in the Island of Banda, London, 1653 (prose); reprinted 1660.
- Divine Meditations upon several Subjects …, London, 1655; reprinted 1663, 1671, 1679.
- The Banishment of Tarquin, or the Reward of Lust, annexed to Shakespeare's Rape of Lucrece, London, 1655.
- An Elegie on … James Usher, L. Archbishop of Armagh, …, London, 1656.
- The History of the most vile Dimagoras …, London, 1658.
- A Continuation of the History [by his father] of Argalus and Parthenia, London, 1659.
- Rebellions Downfall, London, 1662, broadside.
- Londons Disease and Cure. Being a Soveraigne Receipt against the Plague, for Prevention sake, London, 1665, broadside.
- The Citizens Flight, with their Recall, to which is added Englands Tears and Englands Comforts, London, 1665.
- Self-Conflict, or the powerful Motions between the Flesh and Spirit, represented in the Person … of Joseph … , London, 1680; reprinted, with a slightly different title (Triumphant Chastity, or Joseph's Self-Conflict), 1684.

There is nothing in the book to show that this last item, a translation entirely in the manner of Quarles, is a posthumous publication, but the date of his death given above is confirmed by William Winstanley, who was apparently acquainted with at least one member of his family. Quarles also wrote a prose preface to John Hall's Emblems, 1648, and contributed verses to Thomas Fuller's Abel Redevivus (1651).
