= Francis Quarles =

English poet (1592–1644)

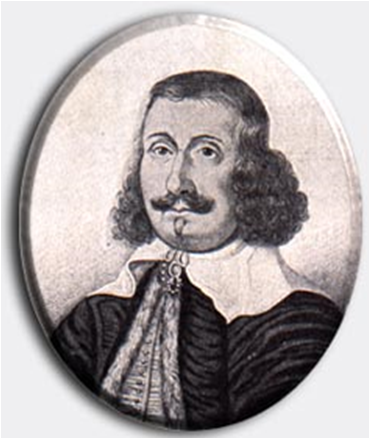
- Born: Romford, Essex, England
- Baptised: 8 May 1592
- Died: 8 September 1644 (aged 52); London, England
- Education: Christ's College, Cambridge
- Occupation: Poet
- Notable work: Emblems
- Spouse: Ursula Woodgate (m. 1618)
- Children: 18, including John Quarles (poet)

Francis Quarles (about 8 May 1592 – 8 September 1644) was an English poet most notable for his emblem book entitled Emblems.

== Early life ==
Francis Quarles was born in Romford, Essex, and baptised there on 8 May 1592. His family had a long history of royal service. His great-grandfather, George Quarles, was Auditor to King Henry VIII, and his father, James Quarles, was Clerk of the Green Cloth, and Purveyor of the Navy, in Queen Elizabeth's reign. His mother, Joan Dalton, was the daughter and heiress of Eldred Dalton of Mores Place, Hadham. Francis grew up in the Manor of Stewards. There were eight children in the family; the eldest, Sir Robert Quarles, was knighted by James I in 1608.

Francis Quarles was entered at Christ's College, Cambridge, in 1608, and subsequently joined Lincoln's Inn to read for the bar. In 1613, when Princess Elizabeth married Frederick V of the Electoral Palatinate, Quarles was made her cupbearer and went with her to the continent, remaining in post for some years.

I love the earth - she is my Maker's creature,
She is my mother for she gave me birth.
She is my tender nurse - she gives me food.
But what is a creature, Lord, compared with Thee?
Or what is my mother or my nurse to me?

I love the air - her dainty sweets refresh
My drooping soul and to new sweets invite me.
But what is the air or all the sweets that she
Can bless my soul withal, compared to Thee?

— From the "Delight In God Only" poem by Francis Quarles

== Career ==
Some time before 1629, Quarles was appointed as secretary to James Ussher, Archbishop of Armagh and primate of all Ireland.

About 1633, Quarles returned to England, and spent the next two years in the preparation of his Emblems. In 1639 he was made city chronologer, a post in which Ben Jonson and Thomas Middleton had preceded him. At the outbreak of the Civil War, he took the Royalist side, drawing up three pamphlets in 1644 in support of the king's cause. It is said that his house was searched and his papers destroyed by the Parliamentarians in consequence of these publications.

Quarles married Ursula Woodgate in 1618, by whom he had eighteen children. His son, John Quarles (1624–1665), was exiled to Flanders for his Royalist sympathies and was the author of Fons Lachrymarum (1648) and other poems.

The work by which Quarles is best known, the Emblems, was originally published in 1634, with grotesque illustrations engraved by William Marshall and others. The forty-five prints in the last three books are borrowed from the designs by Boetius à Bolswert for the Pia Desideria (Antwerp, 1624) of Herman Hugo. Each "emblem" consists of a paraphrase from a passage of Scripture, expressed in ornate and metaphorical language, followed by passages from the Christian Fathers, and concluding with an epigram of four lines.

The Emblems was immensely popular with readers, but the critics of the 17th and 18th centuries had no mercy on Quarles. Sir John Suckling in his Sessions of the Poets disrespectfully alluded to him as he "that makes God speak so big in's poetry." Pope in the Dunciad spoke of the Emblems, "Where the pictures for the page atone / And Quarles is saved by beauties not his own."

== Works ==
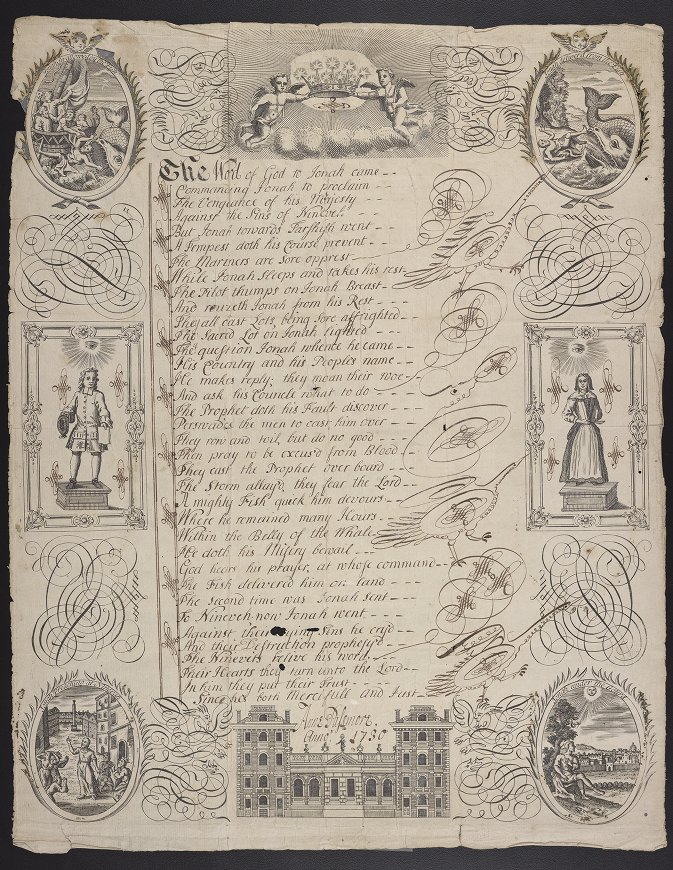
A student's writing sheet (1730), quoting Francis Quarles' "A Feast for Wormes."

The works of Quarles include:

- A Feast for Wormes. Set forth in a Poeme of the History of Jonah (1620), which contains other scriptural paraphrases, besides the one that furnishes the title
- Hadassa; or the History of Queene Ester (1621)
- Job Militant, with Meditations Divine and Moral (1624)
- Sions Elegies, wept by Jeremie the Prophet (1624)
- Sions Sonets sung by Solomon the King (1624), a paraphrase of the Canticles
- The Historie of Samson (1631)
- Alphabet of Elegies upon ... Dr Aylmer (1625)
- Argalus and Parthenia (1629), the subject of which is borrowed from Philip Sidney's Arcadia
- four books of Divine Fancies digested into Epigrams, Meditations and Observations (1632)
- a reissue of his scriptural paraphrases and the Alphabet of Elegies as Divine Poems (1633)
- Hieroglyphikes of the Life of Man (1638)
- Memorials Upon the Death of Sir Robert Quarles, Knight (1639), in honor of his brother
- Enchyridion, containing Institutions Divine and Moral (1640–41), a collection of four "centuries" of miscellaneous aphorisms
- Observations concerning Princes and States upon Peace and Warre (1642)
- Boanerges and Barnabas—Wine and Oyle for ... afflicted Soules (1644–46), collection of miscellaneous reflections
- three violent Royalist tracts (1644), The Loyal Convert, The Whipper Whipt, and The New Distemper, reissued in one volume in 1645 with the title of The Profest Royalist
- his quarrel with the Times, and some elegies
- Solomon's Recantation ... (1645), which contains a memoir by his widow
- The Shepheards' Oracles (1646)
- a second part of Boanerges and Barnabas (1646)
- a broadside entitled A Direfull Anathema against Peace-haters (1647)
- an interlude, The Virgin Widow (1649).

An edition of the Emblems (Edinburgh, 1857) was embellished with new illustrations by CH Bennett and WA Rogers These are reproduced in the complete edition (1874) of Quarles included in the "Chertsey Worthies Library" by Alexander Balloch Grosart, who provides an introductory memoir and an appreciation of Quarles's value as a poet.

== Legacy ==
British composer Mary Plumstead (1905-1980) used Quarles’ text for her song “On Jacob’s Pillow.”

== Bibliography ==
- Karl Josef Höltgen, 'Francis Quarles and the Low Countries', in Bart Westerweel (Ed.), Anglo-Dutch Relations in the Field of the Emblem: Symbola et Emblemata Volume VII (Brill: Leiden, New York & Köln 1997), 123–148.
- Wagner, Jean, Black poets of the United States: from Paul Laurence Dunbar to Langston Hughes, University of Illinois Press, 1973, ISBN 0-252-00341-1
- Henry David Thoreau, 'Walden', "And as he spake, his wings would now and then/Spread, as he meant to fly, then close again".
