= James Brown Craven =

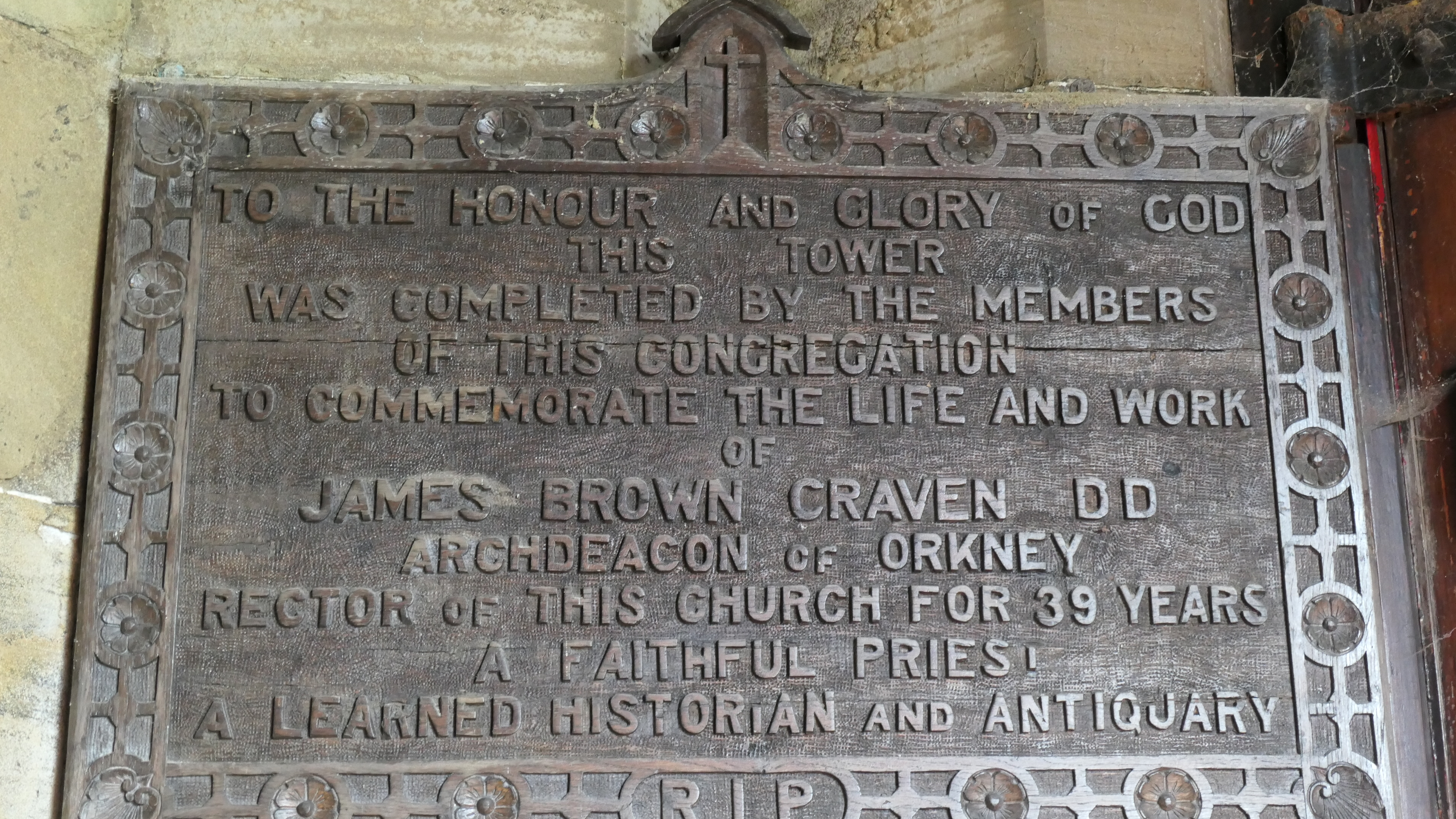
Plaque in St Olaf's Episcopal Church, Kirkwall, Orkney

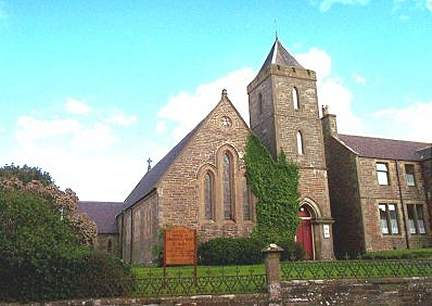
St Olaf's Church, Kirkwall

Archdeacon James Brown Craven (June 1850 – 17 April 1924) was a Scottish Episcopalian priest and author of the History of the Church in Orkney and several other works on ecclesiastical history. He was a founder and the first president of the Orkney Antiquarian Society.

The son of Rev John Eldridge Craven, Free Church of Scotland minister at Newhills, near Aberdeen, James Brown Craven was educated at Aberdeen Grammar School and Aberdeen University. He was ordained deacon in the Scottish Episcopal Church on Michaelmas Day 1875, and priest on 30 July 1876, both by Thomas Suther, Bishop of Aberdeen and Orkney. He went to Orkney in 1876 to be rector of the newly built St Olaf's Episcopal Church in Kirkwall, and stayed there until his death. He was made Doctor of Divinity at Aberdeen University in 1908. Bishop Anthony Mitchell appointed him archdeacon of Orkney in 1913.

Craven was also the author of books on Hermetic alchemists and mystic physicians including:

- Doctor Robert Fludd (Robertus de Fluctibus), the English Rosicrucian: life and writings. 1890.
- Count Michael Maier, doctor of philosophy and of medicine, alchemist, Rosicrucian, mystic, 1568–1622: life and writings. 1910.
- Doctor Heinrich Khunrath: A Study in Mystical Alchemy. Published 1997. Adam McLean, Glasgow.

His library and papers are held at the University of Aberdeen. His collection of books included the "Bibliotheck of Kirkwall", the origin of Orkney Library founded in 1683.
