= Florin George Călian =

Romanian historian

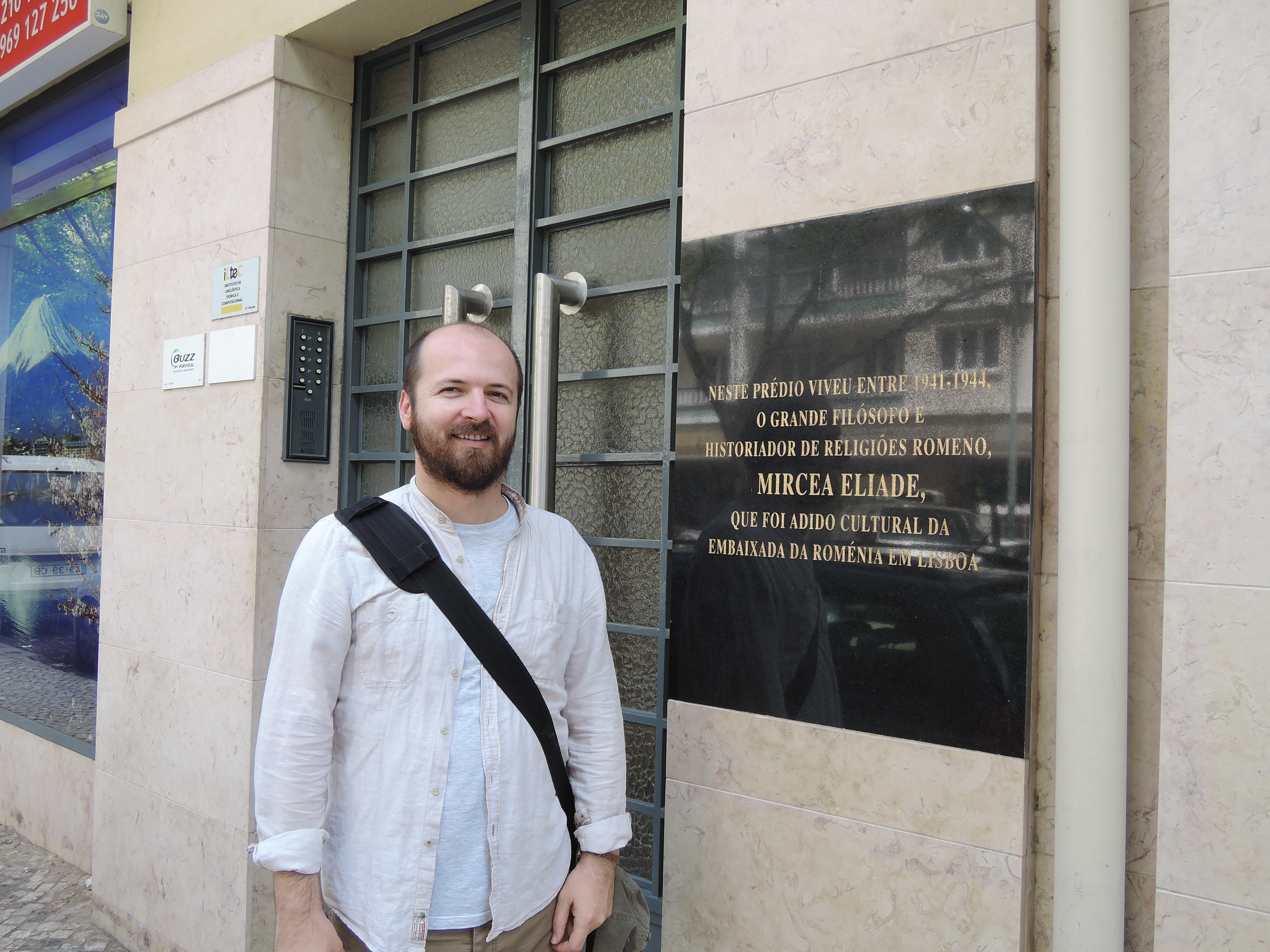
- Born: 6 October 1978 (age 48); Bucharest, Romania
- Occupations: Historian, philosopher, journalist, essayist

Education
- Education: University of Bucharest, Central European University
- Doctoral advisor: Gabor Betegh

Philosophical work
- School: Continental philosophy Analytic philosophy
- Institutions: Central European University
- Main interests: Religious Studies, Ancient Philosophy

Florin George Călian (born October 6, 1978) is a Romanian historian of religion and of philosophy. He is a researcher at the Institute for Ecumenical Research at the Lucian Blaga University.

Since 2020 he has been the coordinator of the Andre Scrima scholarship program, offered by the Sibiu Ecumenical Research Center.

== Educational background ==
Florin George Călian studied psychology, philosophy and classical languages in Bucharest. He holds an MA degree in archeology and Greek-Roman history from the University of Bucharest, and a second MA in Medieval studies, with a specialisation in Religious Studies, from Central European University. He received his doctorate from Central European University with a dissertation on Plato's ontology of numbers, under the supervision of Gábor Betegh.

== Professional background ==
Călian had held research stays at the Departement für Philosophie of Université Fribourg (Switzerland), Trinity College (University of Oxford), Plato Center (Trinity College Dublin), Tübinger Stift (Eberhard Karls Universität Tübingen), New Europe College (Bucharest), Robarts Library (Toronto), Department of Incunabula, Old and Precious Books, Österreichische Nationalbibliothek (Wien).

Together with the philologist Antoaneta Sabău, he founded the Dan Slușanschi School for Classical and Oriental Languages, which is administrated by the Lucian Blaga University of Sibiu. The main languages thought at the school are: Spoken Latin, Ancient Greek, Sahidic Coptic, Biblical Hebrew and Old Slavonic. He published and lectured on platonic and neoplatonic philosophy, classical philology, religious studies, sacred spaces, etc. He is member of the editorial boards of SCHOLÉ. Independent Journal of Philosophy and the Review of Ecumenical Studies. As journalist he has written for publications inlcuding Neue Zürcher Zeitung, The Armenian Weekly, Capital Cultural, Contributors, etc.

== Interviews and media ==
- Nicht jeder Spezialist ist auch ein Intellektueller,
- Philosophy, Research, Classics
- Studying classical philology (with Antoaneta Sabău)
- Philosophy today
- Transparențe TVR Cluj
- The Philosophy Cottage (TVR Cultural documentary)

== See also ==
- Dan Slușanschi
- Antoaneta Sabău
- Central European University
- Lucian Blaga University of Sibiu
