= Lucian Blaga University of Sibiu =

Public university in Sibiu, Romania

- Universitatea „Lucian Blaga" din Sibiu
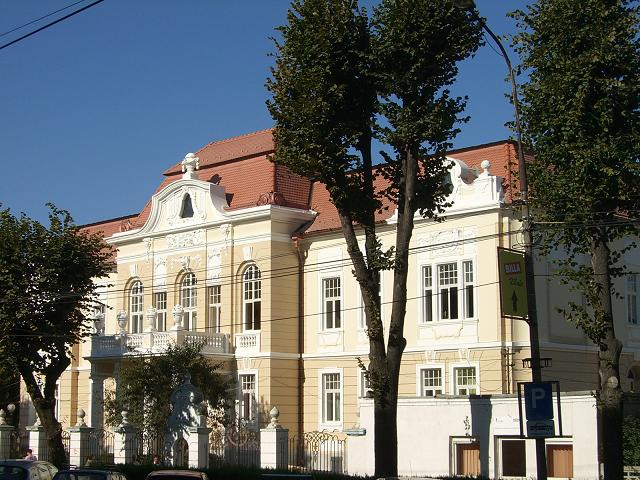
- Rectorate building of Lucian Blaga University of Sibiu
- Other name: ULBS
- Motto: Mens Agitat Molem
- Motto in English: Mind moves matter
- Type: Public
- Established: 5 March 1990
- Rector: Sorin Radu
- Academic staff: 881
- Undergraduates: 11,059 (2019–2020)
- Postgraduates: 2,733
- Doctoral students: 429
- Location: Bulevardul Victoriei, nr. 10, Sibiu, 550024, Romania; 45.790509°N 24.145728°E
- Website: ulbsibiu.ro

University rankings

Global – Overall
- QS World: 1201–1400 (2024)
- THE World: 1501+ (2024)

The Lucian Blaga University of Sibiu (Romanian: Universitatea "Lucian Blaga" din Sibiu, ULBS) is a public university in Sibiu, Romania. It is named after the philosopher, poet, and playwright, Lucian Blaga. It was founded in 1990 with five schools: Letters, History and Law, Medicine, Food and Textile Processing Technology, Engineering and Sciences.

== Faculties ==
- Faculty of Agricultural Sciences, Food Industry and Environmental Protection
- Faculty of Economics (International Affairs, Finance-Banking, Marketing, Management, Economic informatics, Economics, Accounting and administration, Economy trade, tourism and services)
- Faculty of Engineering (Industrial Engineering, Mechanical Engineering, Mines, Oil and Gases, Engineering and Management, Computers and Information Technology, Electronic Engineering, Environment Engineering, Transportation Engineering, Applied Science and Engineering, Systems Engineering, Electronic Engineering and Telecommunication)
- Faculty of Law (Law, Public Administration, Community Police)
- Faculty of Letters and Arts (Romanian Language and Literature, Applied Modern Languages, Sciences of Communication, Theatre)
- Faculty of Medicine (Medicine, Dental Medicine, Health Care, Dental Technique, Dental Care)
- Social and Human Sciences (International Relations, Political Science, Security Studies, History, Heritage, Protestant Theology, Journalism, Public Relations, Sociology, Psychology)
- Faculty of Sciences (Mathematics, Informatics, Ecology and Environment Protection, Biology, Physics, Physical Education and Sports)
- Faculty of Theology (Pastoral Theology, Teaching Theology, Social Theology)

The University Department of Distance Learning

=== Faculty of Engineering ===
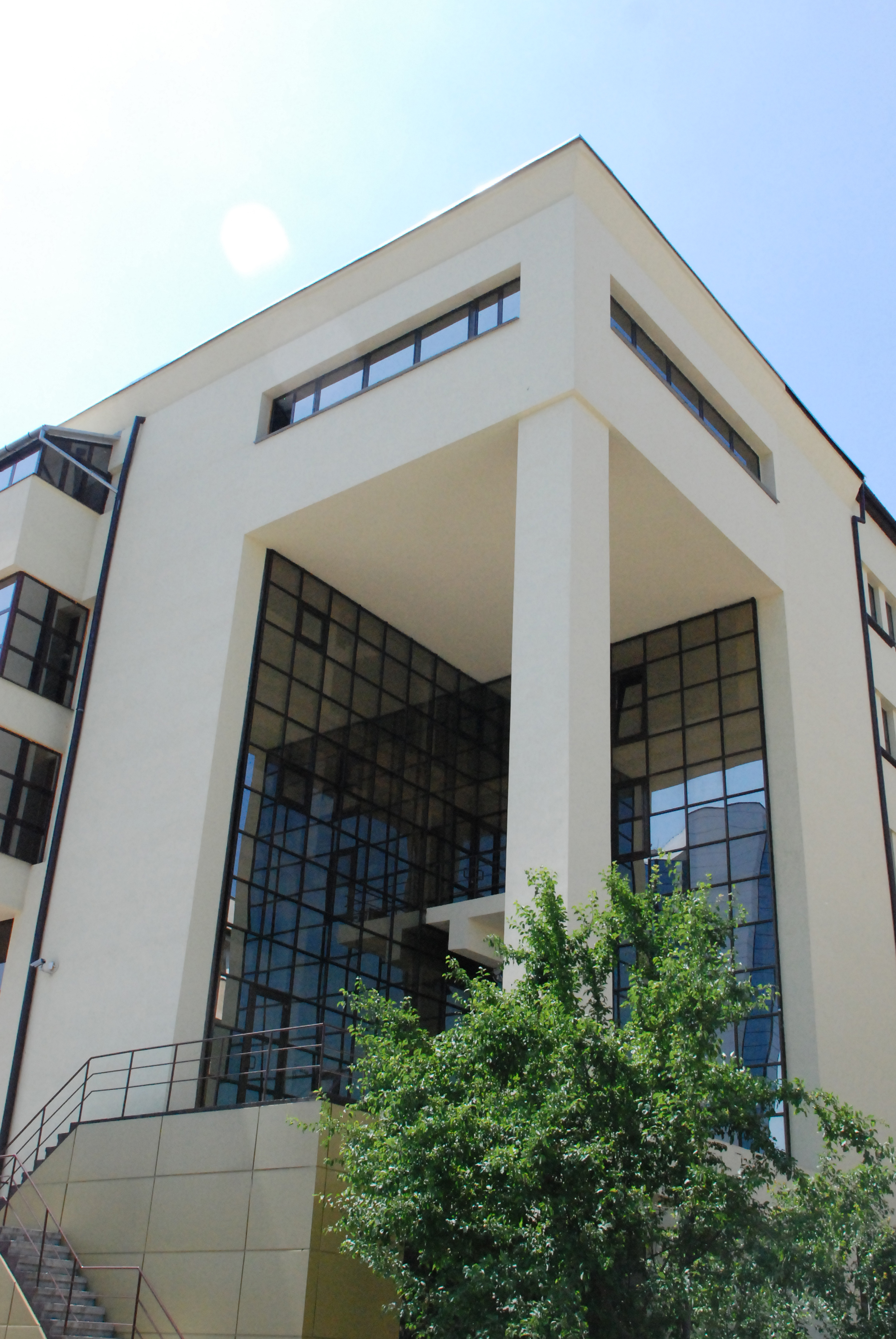
Faculty of Engineering, Lucian Blaga University of Sibiu

The school of engineering was established in 1976, as the Institute of Superior Education. In 1986 it was transformed into the Sub-Engineering Institute, subordinated to the Technical University of Cluj-Napoca.

In 1990, the Institute of Superior Education changes its name to "Lucian Blaga" University of Sibiu, and the Mechanical Faculty became the School of Engineering.

Honoring the technical contributions of Hermann Oberth, the famous rocket scientist born in Sibiu, the Engineering Faculty adopted his name, and now is called the "Hermann Oberth" School of Engineering.

Students have now the opportunity to choose from a wide range of technical specializations: Industrial Engineering, Economical Engineering, Environmental Engineering, Transportation Engineering, Computer Science and Computer Engineering, Textile Engineering and Transportation, Distribution and Storage of Hydrocarbures. After graduation, students have the opportunity to continue their studies with post-graduate and doctoral programs in Quality Management, Manufacturing Management, Computer Science, Human Resource Management, Natural Gas Valorification and Advanced CAD Technologies.

=== Faculty of Social and Human Sciences ===
The school of journalism was established in 1992 and accredited within three years for its high standards in education. In 2001 it was extended with new degree programs: Communication Sciences and Public Relations, as well as Philosophy. Students have the opportunity to continue their studies with post-graduate programs in Communication Sciences and Publishing, Journalism and Public Relations, Culture and Communication.

=== Faculty of Theology ===
The faculty of theology is the oldest one in Sibiu.

== Gallery ==
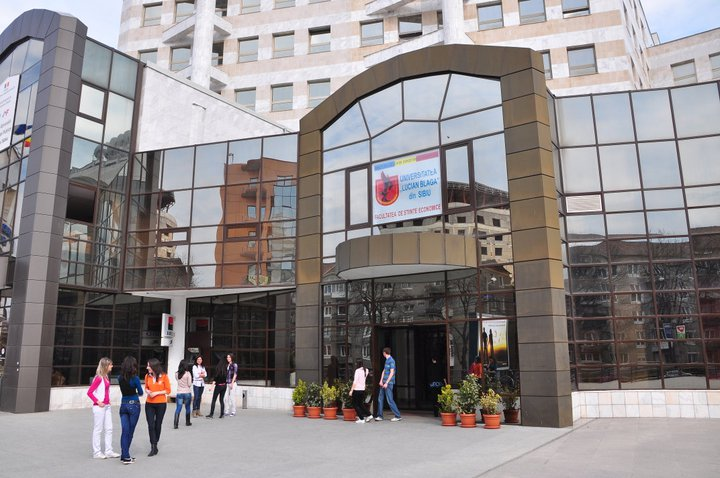
Faculty of Economics

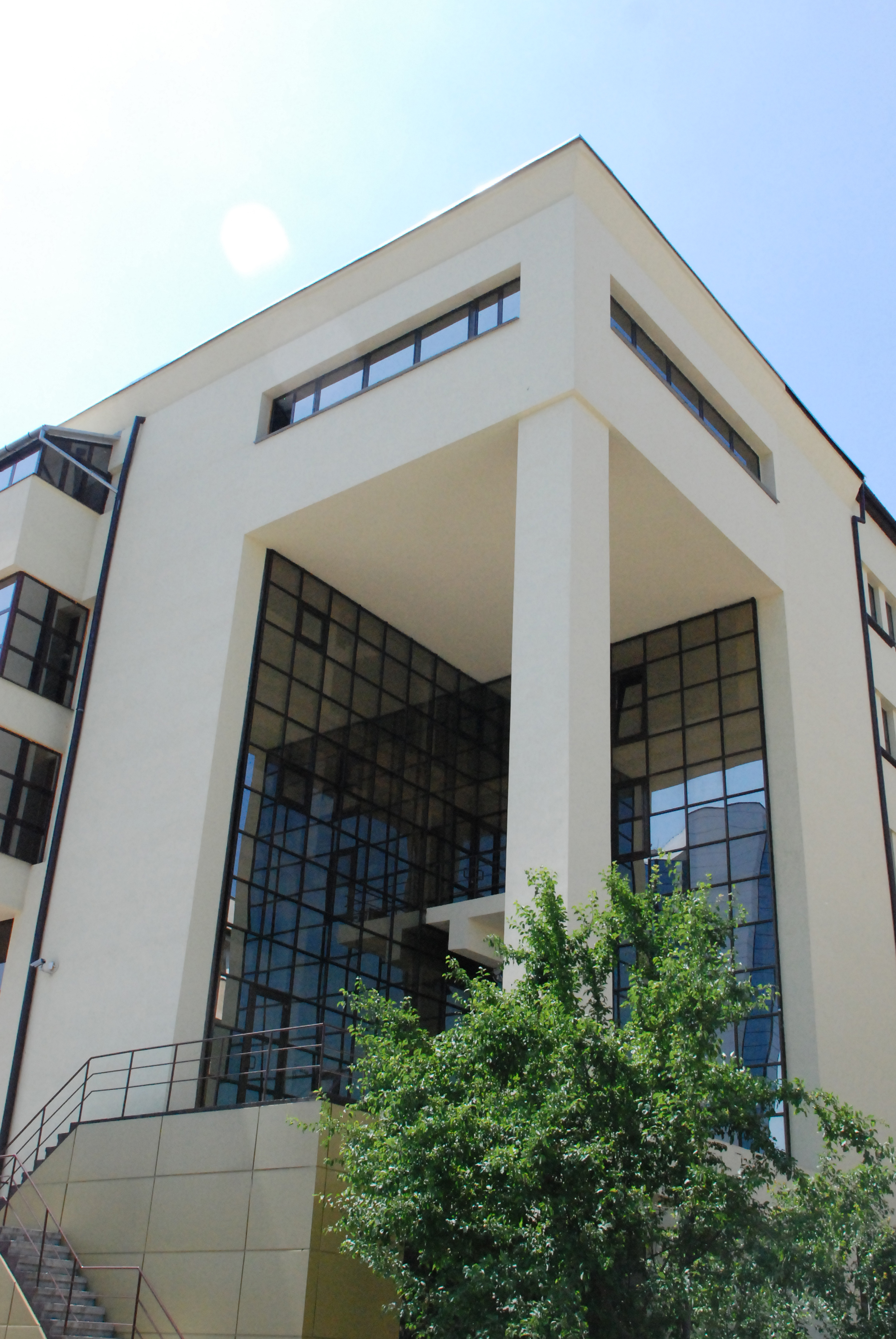
Faculty of Engineering

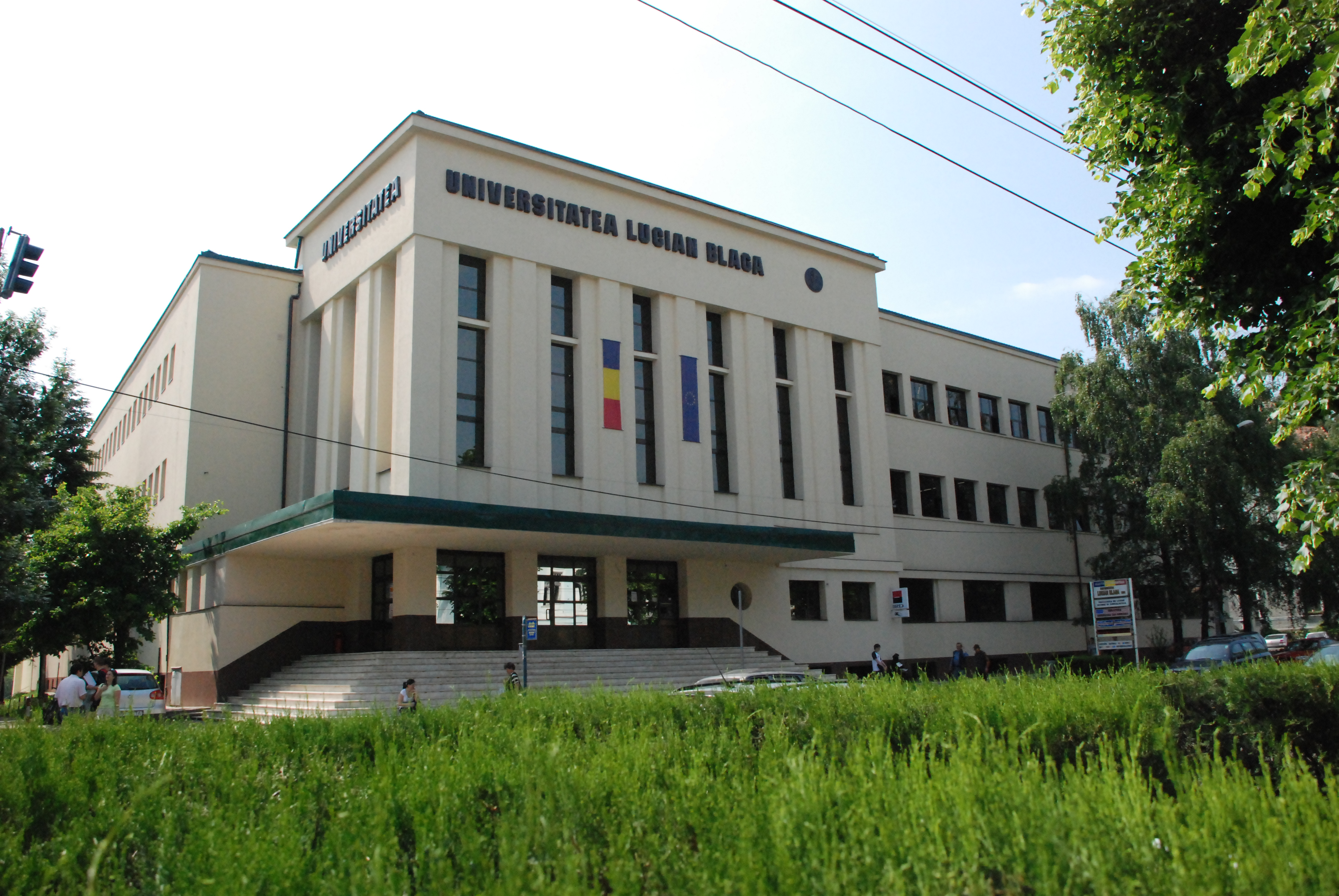
Faculty of Letters and Arts

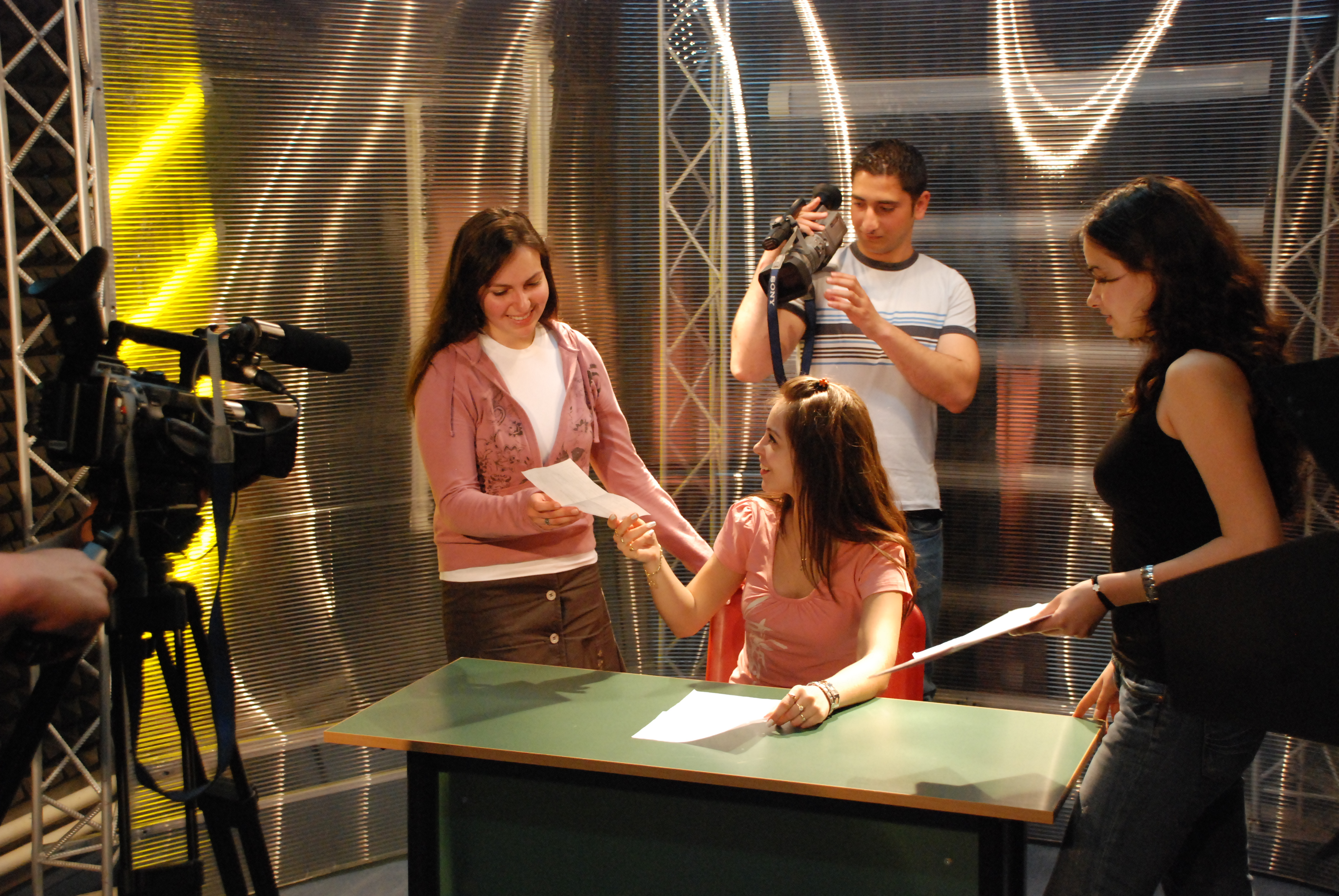
Students at the Department of Journalism, Public Relations, Sociology and Psychology

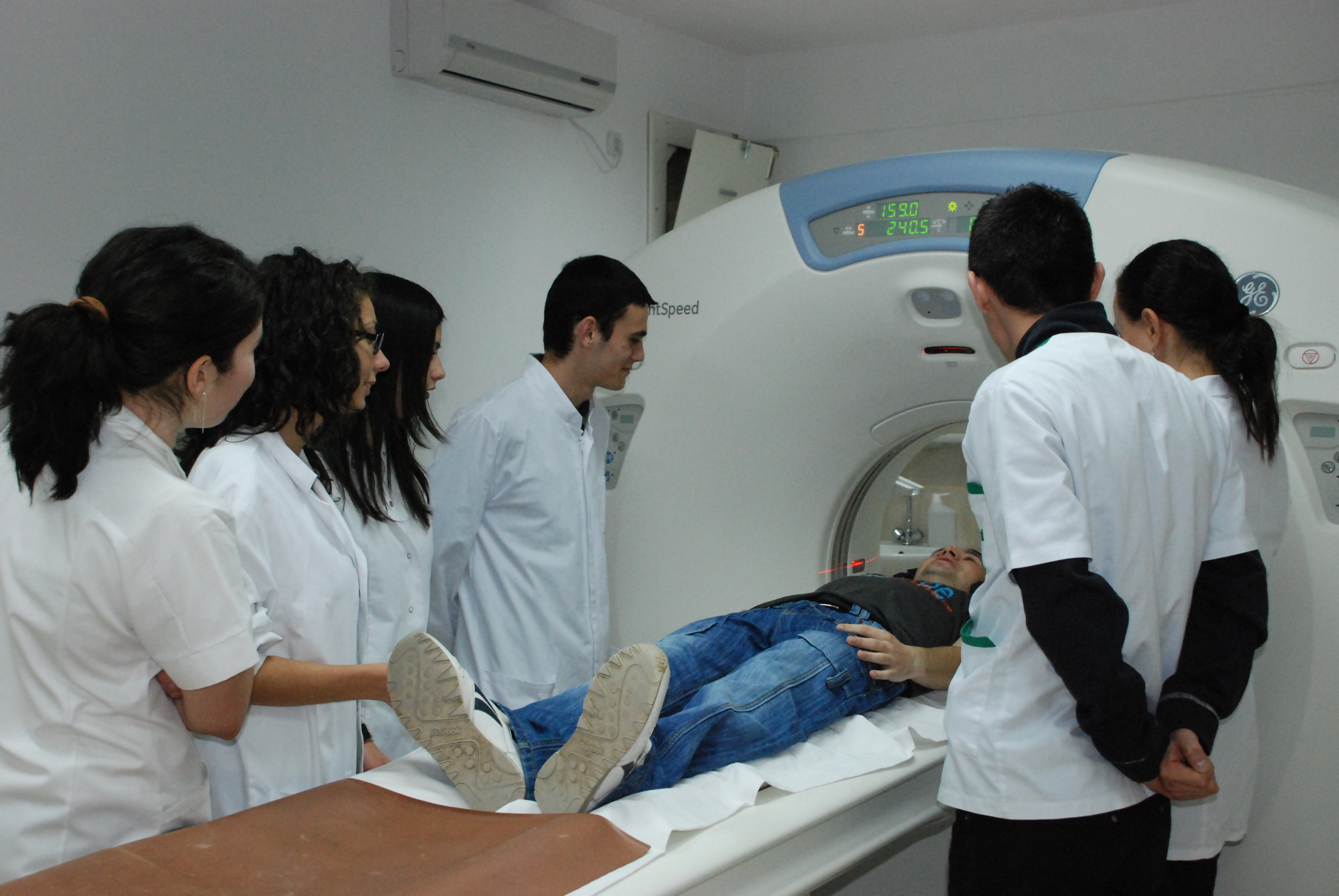
Students at the Faculty of Medicine

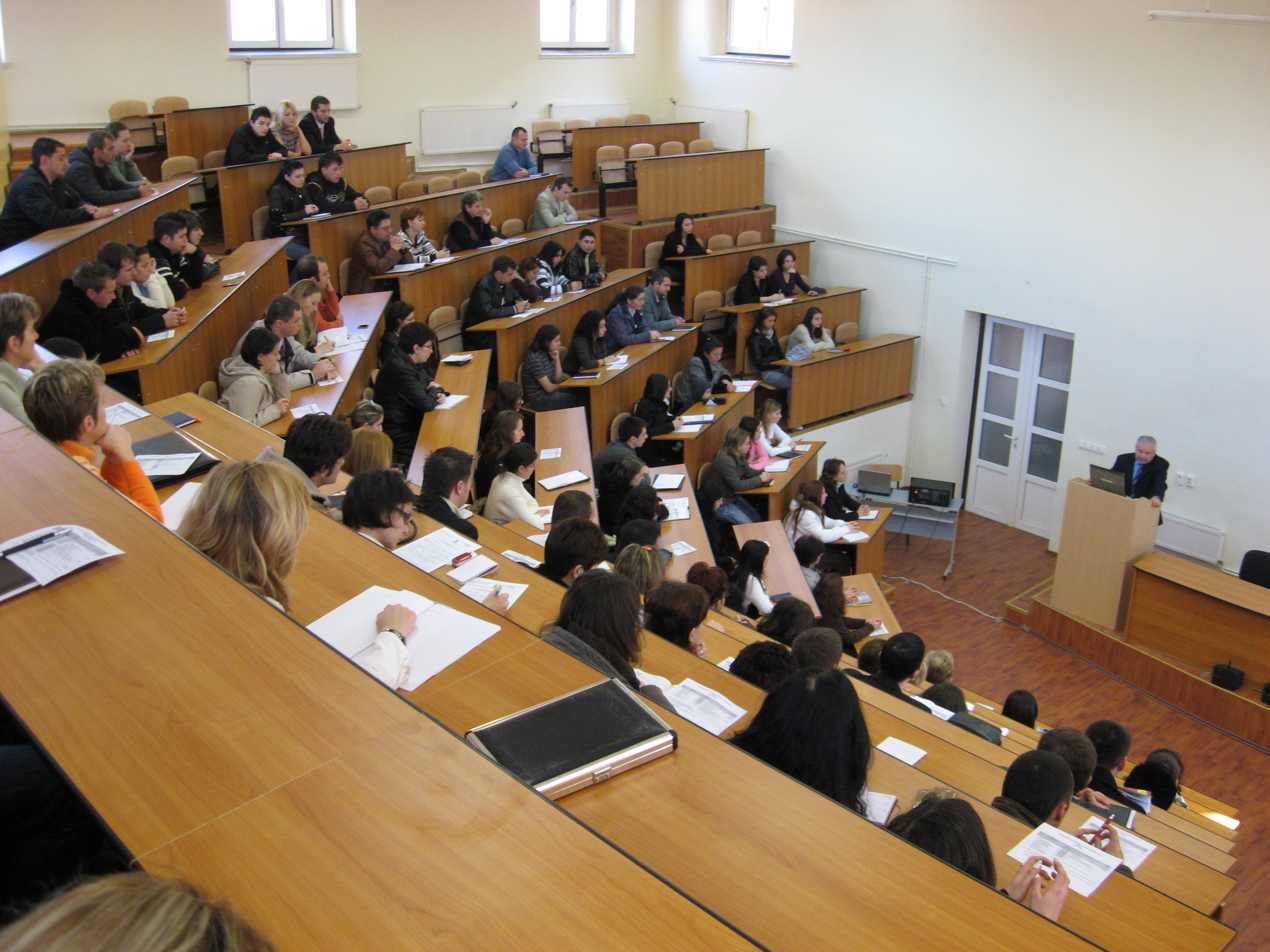
Students

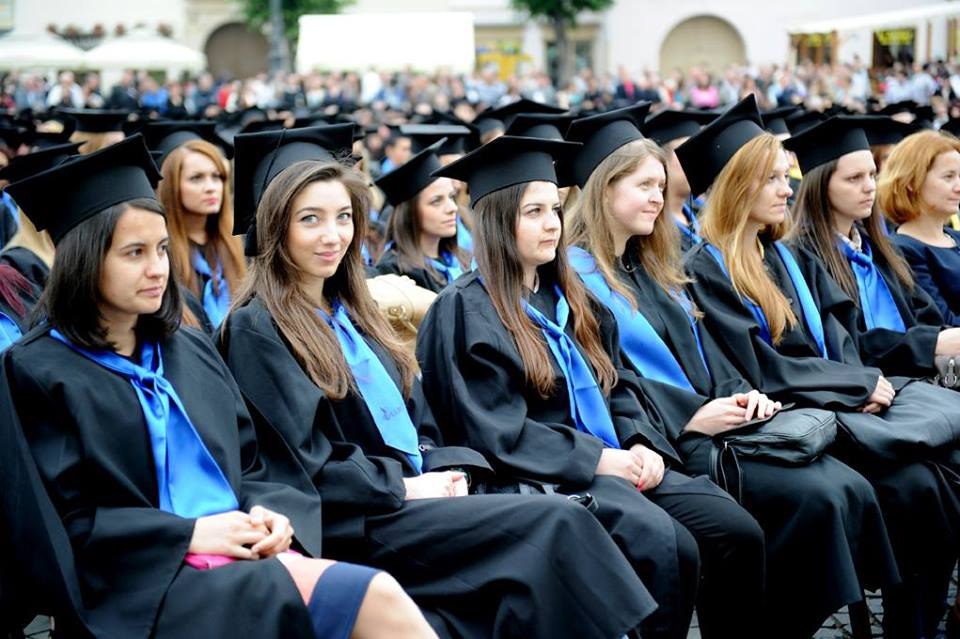
Students
