= Alchemy in art and entertainment =

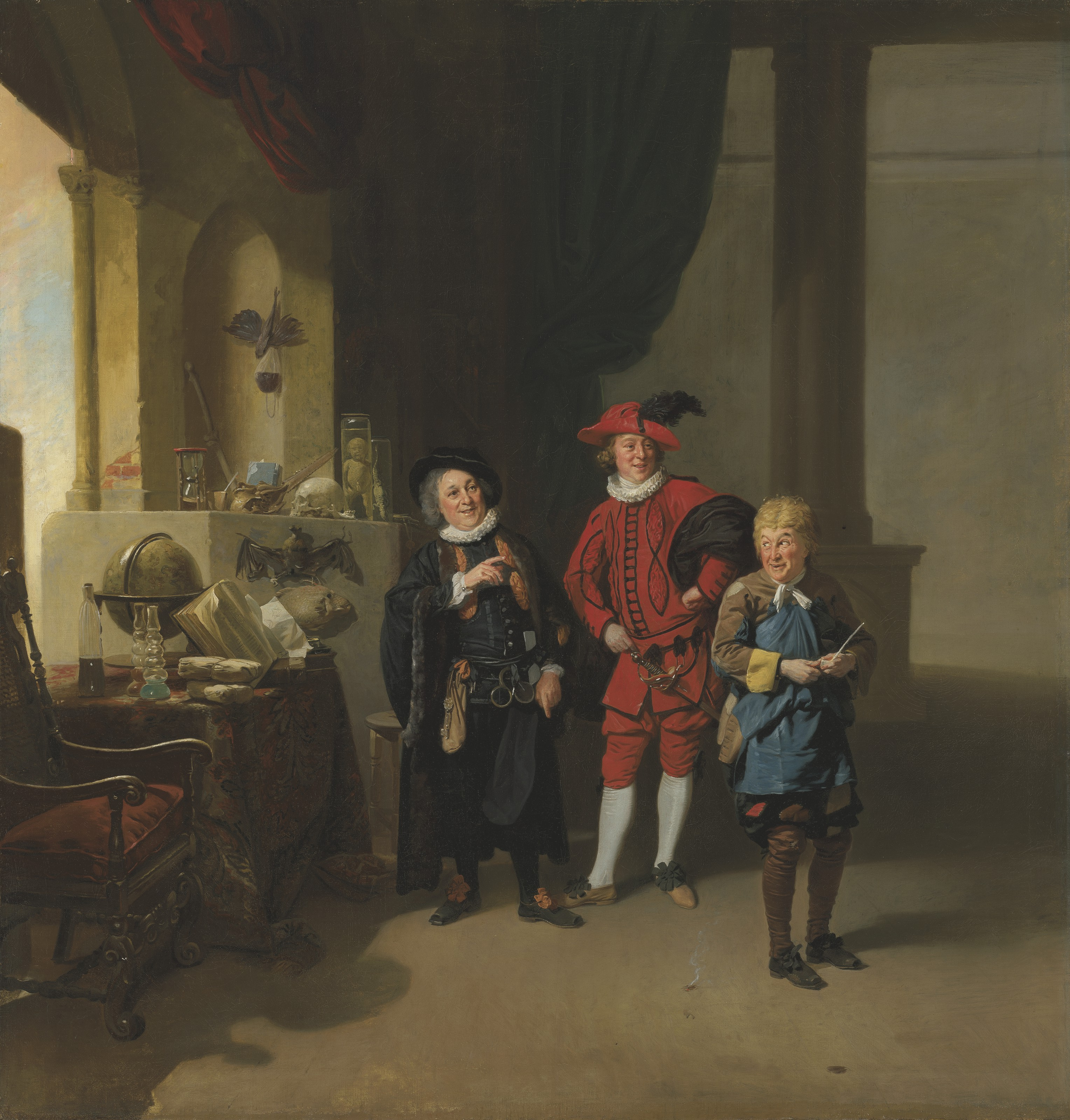
David Garrick as Abel Drugger in Jonson's The Alchemist, c. 1770 by Johann Zoffany

Alchemy has had a long-standing relationship with art, seen both in alchemical texts and in mainstream entertainment. Literary alchemy appears throughout the history of English literature from Shakespeare to modern Fantasy authors. Here, characters or plot structure follow an alchemical magnum opus. In the fourteenth century, Chaucer began a trend of alchemical satire that can still be seen in recent fantasy works like those of Terry Pratchett.

Visual artists had a similar relationship with alchemy. While some of them used alchemy as a source of satire, others worked with the alchemists themselves or integrated alchemical thought or symbols in their work. Music was also present in the works of alchemists and continues to influence popular performers. In the last hundred years, alchemists have been portrayed in a magical and spagyric (ie. medicinal) role in fantasy fiction, film, television, comics and video games.

== Visual art ==
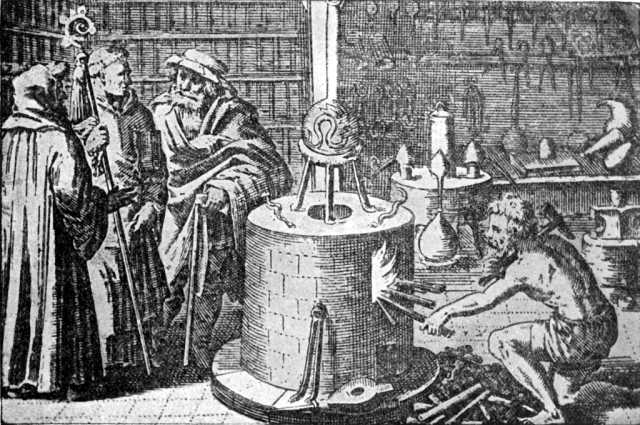
Alchemical engraving published by Lucas Jennis in Michael Maier's Tripus Aureus (1618)

Jan Bäcklund and Jacob Wamberg categorize alchemical art into the following four groups:

1. images made within the alchemical culture proper;
2. genre images which portray alchemists and their environment;
3. religious, mythological or genre images which appropriate alchemical ideas or motifs as a kind of Panofskian ‘disguised symbolism’; and
4. images which show structural affinities with alchemy without iconographically alluding to it.

Within the first group are the illuminations and emblems within the alchemical texts. Illustrations appeared in early works such as the Chrysopoeia of Cleopatra but were largely absent in medieval works until the mid-thirteenth century. In the early fifteenth century, significant pictorial elements appeared in alchemical works such as the Ripley Scroll and the Mutus Liber.

This trend developed further in sixteenth century emblems. Inspired by the work of Horapollo, this allegorical art form was adopted by alchemists and used in the engravings of Matthäus Merian, Lucas Jennis, Johann Theodor de Bry, Aegidius Sadeler, and others.

The trend of depicting alchemists in genre works began with Pieter Brueghel the Elder (c. 1525–1569), and was continued in the work of Jan Steen (1626–1679) and David Teniers the Younger (1610–1690).

Alchemy has also played a role in the evolution of paint. Alchemists and pigment manufacture intersect as early as the Leyden papyrus X and Stockholm papyrus, and as late as Robert Boyle's Origin of Formes and Qualities (1666). The pigment recipes of artists such as Cennino Cennini and Theophilus have been influenced by both the practical and theoretical aspects of alchemy, and contained some allegorical and magical elements.

=== Modern art and exhibition ===
Some contemporary artists use alchemy as inspiring subject matter, or use alchemical symbols in their work. While alchemy is marginal to current visual art, alchemical thinking remains central. Some lesser known artists such as Brett Whiteley, Krzysztof Gliszczynski, and Thérèse Oulton openly use alchemical symbols. On the other hand, alchemical influences in the work of renowned artists such as Jackson Pollock, Marcel Duchamp and Salvador Dalí may be more superficial, and not the primary importance of the work. It is more the idea of alchemy, than alchemy itself, that has influenced these artists. Other examples of alchemy in modern art include:

- Michael Pearce, Fama and The Aviator's Dream.
- Adam McLean
- Max Ernst
- Odd Nerdrum
- Matthew Barney, Ren (2008), Guardian of the Veil (2007) and Khu (2010).
- Anselm Kiefer
- Michael Maschka, The Alchemist (1995), Hermaphrodite (2016)
- Reuben Kadish, A Dissertation on Alchemy (1937). Fresco in San Francisco.

== Novels and plays ==
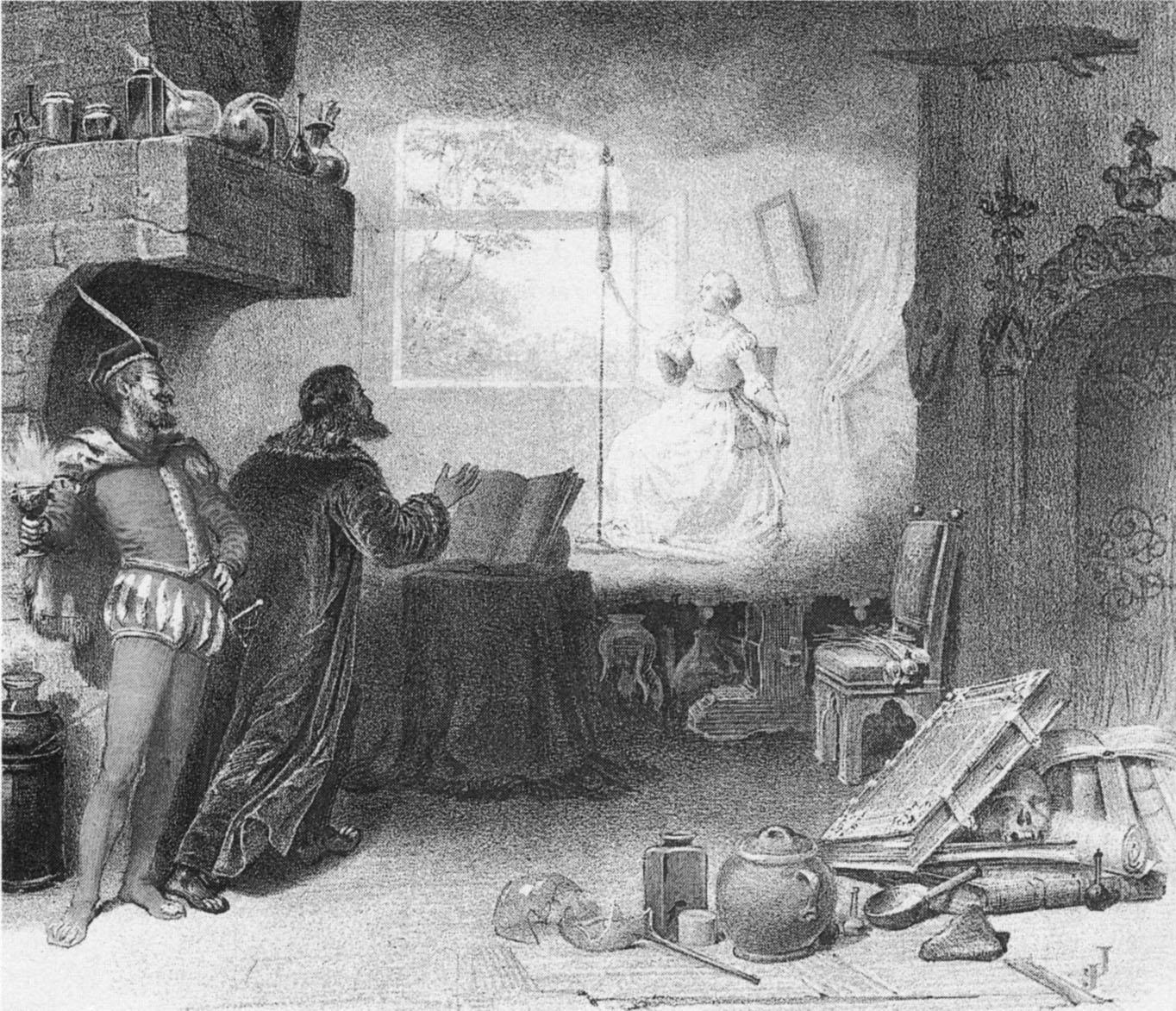
Alchemist Johann Georg Faust inspired the legend of Faust, depicted in novels, plays, and operas.

Like alchemy in visual art, the intersection of alchemy and literature can be broken down into four categories:

1. The alchemical texts themselves;
2. Satirical attacks on alchemists;
3. Stories that incorporate alchemical iconography; and
4. Works that are structurally alchemical, known as literary alchemy.

In the first category are the writings of alchemists. Beginning with Zosimos of Panopolis (AD 300) and extending through the history of alchemy, texts appear in the alchemical corpus that are more allegorical than technical. A much later example of this can be found in The Chymical Wedding of Christian Rosenkreutz (1616).

In the second category are critiques of alchemical charlatanism. Starting in the fourteenth century, some writers lampooned alchemists and used them as the butt of satirical attacks. Some early and well-known examples are:

- Dante Alighieri, Inferno (ca. 1308–1321).
- William Langland, Piers Plowman (ca. 1360–1387).
- Geofrey Chaucer, Canon's Yeoman's Tale (ca. 1380).
- Ben Jonson, The Alchemist (ca. 1610). On it a butler is left in charge of a house and he uses it to commit crimes and becomes a swindler, at a point in the play is asked for help to obtain a philosopher's stone.
- William Godwin, St. Leon (1799).

A number of 19th-century works incorporated alchemy, including:

- Mary Shelley, Frankenstein; or, The Modern Prometheus (1818).
- Vladimir Odoevsky, Salamandra (1828).
- Victor Hugo, The Hunchback of Notre-Dame (1831).
- Goethe's Faust, Part 2 (1832).
- Friedrich Halm, Der Adept, (1836)

In twentieth and twenty-first century examples, alchemists are generally presented in a more romantic or mystic light, and often little distinction is made between alchemy, magic, and witchcraft. Alchemy has become a common theme in fantasy fiction.

- H. P. Lovecraft, The Alchemist (1916), and The Case of Charles Dexter Ward (1927).
- Thea von Harbou, Metropolis (1925).
- Eric P. Kelly, The Trumpeter of Krakow (1928).
- Antal Szerb, The Pendragon Legend (1934).
- Marguerite Yourcenar, The Abyss (1968).
- Colin Wilson, The Philosopher's Stone (1969)
- Umberto Eco, Foucault's Pendulum (1988).
- Lindsay Clarke, The Chymical Wedding (1989).
- Teresa Edgerton, Child of Saturn (1989), The Moon in Hiding (1989) and The Work of the Sun (1990).
- Terry Pratchett, Discworld novels (1983–2015), Men at Arms (1993).
- John Crowley, Ægypt (1987–2007).
- Max McCoy, Indiana Jones and the Philosopher's Stone (1995).
- Richard Garfinkle, Celestial Matters (1996).
- J. K. Rowling's Harry Potter: Harry Potter and the Philosopher's Stone (1997), Harry Potter and the Chamber of Secrets (1998), Harry Potter and the Prisoner of Azkaban (1999), Harry Potter and the Goblet of Fire (2000), Harry Potter and the Order of the Phoenix (2003), Harry Potter and the Half-Blood Prince (2005), Harry Potter and the Deathly Hallows (2007).
- Gregory Keyes, The Age of Unreason series (1998–2001).
- Neal Stephenson, The Baroque Cycle (2003–2004).
- Martin Booth, Doctor Illuminatus: The Alchemist's Son (2003).
- Margaret Mahy, Alchemy (2004).
- Dean Koontz, Prodigal Son (novel) (2005), City of Night (2005), Dead and Alive (2009), Lost Souls (2011), and The Dead Town (2011).
- Michael Scott, The Secrets of the Immortal Nicholas Flamel (2007)
- Sydney Sage, in Richelle Mead's Vampire Academy and Bloodlines series'
- Hilary Mantel's 1989 novel Fludd

=== Literary alchemy ===
The term "literary alchemy" dates back to at least 1971, when Jennifer R. Walters used it as the title of her essay "Literary Alchemy" in Diacritics magazine. Stanton J. Linden, in his 1996 book Darke Hierogliphicks; Alchemy in English Literature from Chaucer to the Restoration, applies the term both to stories which deal extensively with alchemists and the process of alchemy (of which the earliest is Chaucer's The Canon's Yeoman's Tale), and stories which include alchemical allegory or imagery (of which the most extensive and well-known is the Chymical Wedding of Christian Rosenkreutz). John Granger, who studies the literary alchemy in J. K. Rowling's, Harry Potter series explains:

If you recall your Aristotle on what happens in a proper tragedy, the audience identifies with the hero in his agony and shares in his passion. This identification and shared passion is effectively the same as the experience of the event; the audience experiences katharsis or "purification" in correspondence with the actors. Shakespeare and Jonson, among others, used alchemical imagery and themes because they understood that the work of the theater in human transformation was parallel if not identical to the work of alchemy in that same transformation. The alchemical work was claimed to be greater than an imaginative experience in the theater, but the idea of purification by identification or correspondence with an object and its transformations was the same in both.

In an early example, Sir Thomas Malory uses alchemy as a motif that underlies the personal, psychological, and aesthetic development of Sir Gareth of Orkney in Le Morte d'Arthur. Sir Gareth's quest parallels the process of alchemy in that he first undergoes the nigredo phase by defeating the black knight and wearing his armor. After this, Gareth defeats knights representing the four elements, thereby subsuming their power. In fighting and defeating the Red Knight (the overall purpose of his quest), he undergoes and passes the rubedo phase. Gareth, toward the end of his quest, accepts a ring from his paramour, Lyoness, which transforms his armor into multicolors. This alludes to the panchromatic philosopher's stone, and while he is in multicolored armor, he is unbeatable.

The Tempest is the most alchemically influenced of all William Shakespeare's work, steeped as it is in alchemical imagery (dying Kings and sons, Ariel as the spirit Mercurius etc.) with Prospero as the archetypal Magus. The main character in the play Goodnight Desdemona (Good Morning Juliet), by Ann-Marie MacDonald, succeeds in determining the alchemy behind Shakespeare's Othello. Literary alchemy continues to be popular in novels such as Paulo Coelho's The Alchemist (1988).

David Meakin, in his 1995 book Hermetic Fictions; Alchemy and Irony in the Novel is unusual in categorizing stories as alchemic even if they do not mention alchemists or alchemy, nor include alchemic allegory or imagery, so long as they include elements which obliquely remind him personally of alchemy. For instance, he considers any book about a writer alchemic, because "writing is a kind of alchemy." Captain Nemo's submarine the Nautilus is "alchemic" because it is a "hermetically closed cell" (all submarines are airtight, ergo "hermetically closed"). The game from Hermann Hesse's The Glass Bead Game is concerned with the quest for perfection of knowledge, therefore Meakin considers it "an intellectual alchemy." The list of authors who do not mention alchemy or alchemists, nor use alchemical allegory or imagery, but who use ideas which obliquely remind Meakin of alchemy include Charles Williams, William Godwin, Percy Bysshe Shelley, Émile Zola, Jules Verne, Marcel Proust, Thomas Mann, Hermann Hesse, James Joyce, Gustav Meyrink, Lindsay Clarke, Marguerite Yourcenar, Umberto Eco, Michel Butor, Amanda Quick, Gabriel García Marquez, Mária Szepes and Mikhail Bulgakov (The Master and Margarita).

== Music ==
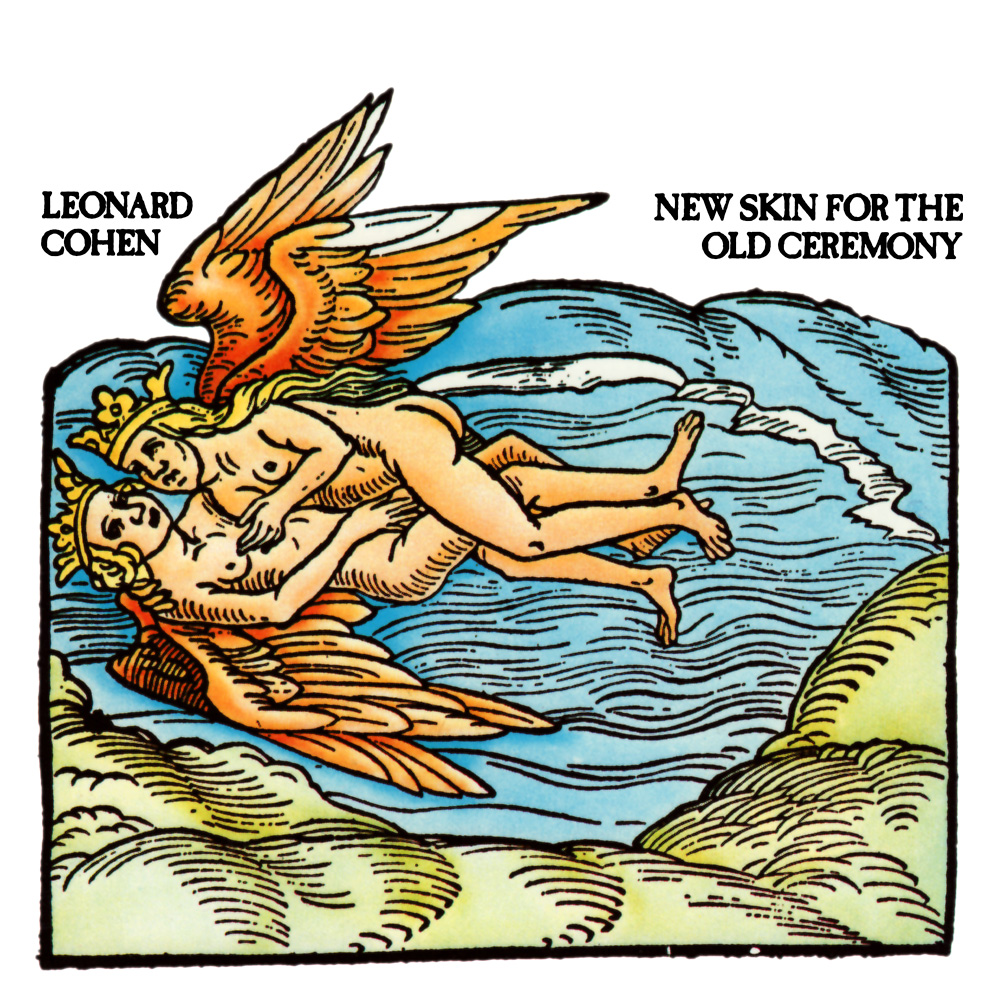
Cover art of New Skin for the Old Ceremony by Leonard Cohen, showing a woodcut from the alchemical text "Rosarium philosophorum".

Some Renaissance alchemists expressed their ideas through music. A similar trend continues today as some musicians express themselves using alchemy.

Heinrich Khunrath's Amphitheatrum Sapientiae Aeternae contains illustrations of musical instruments alongside the text, "Sacred music disperses sadness and malignant spirits", suggesting that music may have played a role in alchemical practice. The strongest example of music within alchemy can be found in the seventeenth century work of Michael Maier. His Atalanta Fugiens included fifty fugues. The fugues were arranged in three voices symbolizing the philosopher's stone, the pursuing adept, and obstacles in his way. These have also been interpreted as corresponding to the alchemical tria prima. "It is the first alchemical Gesamtkunstwerk that comprises music, images, poetry, and prose together in one piece. As is stressed on the frontispiece of the book, all the senses are involved in contact with this treatise: partim oculis et inteflectui... partim auribus et recreationi... videnda, legenda, meditanda, intelligenda, dijudicanda, canenda et audienda. In this respect, Atalanta is a book that requires a rather contemplative exercise". The text of Maier's Cantilenae Intelectuales de Phoenice Redivivo is organized similarly, in three musical voices. Maier writes:

All things in this Universe, all forms, heavenly or earthly, being created in NUMBER, WEIGHT, & MEASURE, there is, between them, an exact and marvellous proportion of parts, strengths, qualities, quantities and effects, such that, together they seem to resemble an extraordinarily harmonious Music, and there is between spiritual beings, amongst which is to be numbered the Mind, or intellect in man, a similar musical concord. [...] ‘Tis the same too for the hidden subject of the Hermetic Philosophers: a sort of philosophical micro-world, naturally divided into three ordered parts, bass, tenor and soprano, just as the hammers heard by Pythagoras in the smithy played a pleasant harmony by reason of their various and proportional weights.

Alchemy continues to influence musicians. In more recent times, concept albums have been created around alchemical motifs. Alchemy can be incorporated into song or album structure, cover art, and lyrics. Some examples include:

- Jorge Ben Jor, A Tábua De Esmeralda
- Manuel Freire, Pedra Filosofal (1969)
- Bruce Dickinson, The Chemical Wedding (1998)
- Dire Straits, Alchemy
- Susumu Hirasawa, Philosopher's Propeller (2000)
- Kate Bush, You Want Alchemy (1993)
- Home (UK band), The Alchemist
- Yngwie Malmsteen, Alchemy (1999)
- Marilyn Manson, Holy Wood
- Morgana Lefay, Grand Materia (2005)
- Van Morrison, The Philosopher's Stone (1998)
- Mudvayne, The End of All Things to Come
- Pink Floyd, A Saucerful of Secrets
- The Smashing Pumpkins, Machina/The Machines of God (2000)
- Thrice, The Alchemy Index
- Tool, Lateralus (2001)

== Film, television, and webisode ==
Literary alchemy has been extended to film and television. The alchemical quest is plainly visible to the audience in movies such as The Holy Mountain (1973) and Milton's Secret (2016). The Vanishing (1988) is a less conspicuous example. Based on The Golden Egg, this film features direct alchemical devices such as the appearance of the Mutus Liber. More significantly, the plot can be seen alchemically, as the villain completes a twisted interpretation of the alchemical great work. In the American remake of The Vanishing (1993), the alchemical elements were stripped.

Alchemical influence may also be seen in film adaptations of myths and legends. Evidence of an alchemical interpretation of Jason and the Golden Fleece can be found as early as the writings of John of Antioch (seventh century). The alchemical ties to this (and other) myths continued through to Renaissance alchemists, notably in the fifteenth century alchemical book Aureum vellus (Golden Fleece) attributed to Solomon Trismosin. Newer incarnations of these stories like Jason and the Argonauts (1963 film) have the capacity to carry forward alchemical allegory on film. Movies like the Harry Potter film series serve the same function for more recent fiction.

Like other twentieth century forms of entertainment, movies and shows featuring alchemy often include elements of magic and fantasy. Sometimes this extends to magic realism as is in Parash Pathar (1958), and Hudson Hawk (1991). This same sort of portrayal can be found in science fantasy movies like 9 (2009), or in fantasy films like The Dark Crystal (1982). 2014's horror fantasy film As Above, So Below also featured these concepts. 2023's Toei Tokusatsu show Kamen Rider Gotchard also feature concepts of alchemy including magic or fantasy element as its main theme, where the main character attends an alchemy academy. In this interpretation, Alchemy was capable of creating artificial lifeforms known as Chemys that imitate things that exist in this world.

=== Experimental film ===
- The experimental filmmaker James Whitney planned a series of four alchemical films in the mid-1970s. Of these only one was made, called Dwija (1976), described by William Wees as "an alchemical vessel dissolving and materialising again and again within a pulsating stream of coloured light."
- Jordan Belson and Harry Everett Smith also referenced alchemical ideas and imagery in their experimental films.
- The German experimental filmmaker Jürgen Reble has referenced alchemical processes in his physical and chemical manipulation of the filmstrip, describing one particular work, Alchemy, as bridging the gap between the "processing and fixing" of the film.
- In 2010 the moving image artist Richard Ashrowan created a video installation, Alchemist, which used texts by the twelfth century alchemist Michael Scot and included performances related to alchemical themes.

== Graphic novel and animation ==
Alchemy and alchemical concepts appear in comics, as well as Japanese manga and anime in a fashion consistent with twentieth century fantasy fiction. A few examples that feature alchemy heavily are:

- The Fabulous Philosopher's Stone (1955)
- Indiana Jones and the Iron Phoenix (1994)
- Cyber Team in Akihabara (1998)
- Fullmetal Alchemist (2001-2010)
- Baccano! (2003)
- Buso Renkin (2003–2005)
- Yu-Gi-Oh! GX (2004-2008)
- Animamundi: Dark Alchemist (2004)
- Arcana Famiglia (2012)
- Symphogear (2012–2019)
- Sleepless Domain (2015–)

== Video games ==
Alchemy is an element in numerous fantasy genre games. Characters can be portrayed or played as alchemists. Transmutation, spagyric potion making, homunculi, and alchemically created items may be incorporated into the gameplay. Games which include alchemical concepts include:

- Aidyn Chronicles: The First Mage
- Amnesia: The Dark Descent
- La storia della Arcana Famiglia
- Atelier series
- Code Realize (visual novel series)
- Castlevania series
- Chakan: The Forever Man (1992)
- Darklands (1992)
- Devil May Cry
- Dragon Quest series
- Elden Ring
- The Elder Scrolls series
- EverQuest (1998–)
- Final Fantasy series
- Fullmetal Alchemist 2: Curse of the Crimson Elixir
- Fate/Stay Night: Alchemy appeared as a form of Thaumaturgy.
- Genshin Impact
- Golden Sun series
- GrimGrimoire
- Harry Potter and the Philosopher's Stone
- Haunting Ground
- ICO
- Indiana Jones and the Emperor's Tomb
- Kingdom Come: Deliverance
- Kingdoms of Amalur: Reckoning (2012)
- The Lurking Horror
- Mabinogi
- Mana Khemia: Alchemists of Al-Revis
- Marvel: Avengers Alliance (2012)
- Minecraft
- Neverwinter Nights series and Neverwinter (video game)
- Noita (2019)
- Opus Magnum
- A Plague Tale: Innocence
- Pokémon Sun and Pokémon Moon
- Potion Craft
- Ragnarok Online
- The Room (2012) and its sequels
- RuneScape
- Secret of Evermore
- Sea of Stars
- Shadow of Destiny
- Shadow of the Colossus
- Shovel Knight
- Silent Hill
- Skylanders
- Spellbound
- Star Ocean: Till the End of Time
- The Last Guardian
- The Sims 3: Supernatural
- Tomb Raider: The Angel of Darkness
- Tomb Raider: Chronicles
- Ultima Online (1997)
- Ultrakill
- The Witcher (2007) and its sequels
- World of Darkness
- World of Warcraft
- Ys V: Lost Kefin, Kingdom of Sand (1995)
- Ys IX: Monstrum Nox (2019)
- Zork Nemesis (1996)

== See also ==
- Veiled Christ, a 1753 marble sculpture by Giuseppe Sanmartino wrongly believed to have been created using alchemy
