= Hermetic Journal =

- Discipline: Hermeticism
- Language: English

Publication details
- History: 1978–1992
- Frequency: Quarterly

Standard abbreviations
- ISO 4: Hermet. J.

Indexing
- ISSN: 0141-6391

Links
- Journal homepage

The Hermetic Journal was a quarterly journal dedicated to the Hermetic tradition, edited by Adam McLean, and published by Megalithic Research Publications of Edinburgh. The first issue was released in August 1978 and publication continued until 1992.

The Hermetic Journal explored alchemy and hermetic philosophy from various angles and attracted a wide range of contributors. It addressed a readership which had a deep interest in hermeticism and was primarily available only through subscription. Back issues of the Hermetic Journal are still available bound in paperback editions (about 176 pages), each covering a year.

== Influence ==
The Hermetic Journal had a small circulation of about three to four hundred readers. It built up a network of people interested in furthering the investigation of alchemy and hermetic philosophy. It is one of only a few English periodicals which focused on alchemy and the Hermetic tradition in the late twentieth century. Other periodicals of the time were the academic journals Ambix, and Cauda Pavonis, and publications by the Philosophers of Nature and the Paracelsus Research Society for members of their organizations. The Hermetic Journal distinguished itself by publishing over 1000 high quality articles. Often, these contained scholarly material from renowned authorities – such as Gareth Knight, Stephen Skinner, Ithell Colquhoun, Kenneth Rayner Johnson, R.A. Gilbert, Graham Knight, Hans Nintzel, Joseph Ritman, and Joscelyn Godwin. Uniquely, the Hermetic Journal was open to articles of a speculative nature but always tried to encourage scholarly research into hermetic philosophy.
