= Stocker Fontelieu =

Actor

- Born: Charles Stocker Fontelieu; May 5, 1923; New Orleans, Louisiana, U.S.
- Died: December 14, 2009 (aged 86); New Orleans, Louisiana
- Occupation: Actor

Charles Stocker Fontelieu (May 5, 1923 – December 14, 2009) was an American actor, director and producer who participated in more than 470 stage productions.

== Career ==
Fontelieu was recognized for his involvement in the local theatre in New Orleans for over 60 years, including being executive director of Le Petit Theatre du Vieux Carre from 1961 to 1985. A biography on his half-century career, Just Who is Stocker Fontelieu? by Michael P. Cahill, was published in 2007.

In addition to his stage work, Fontelieu also appeared in several feature and TV films. Among them were Angel Heart, Obsession, Live and Let Die, The Toy and Big Momma's House 2 and Mandingo.

Fontelieu died in a nursing home after complications from a fall. He died on December 14, 2009.

== Filmography ==
Year	Title	Role
1976	Obsession	Dr. Ellman
1987	Angel Heart	Ethan Krusemark
2004	Frankenstein	Patrick
