= Obsession (1976 film) =

American psychological thriller film by Brian De Palma

- Theatrical release poster
- Directed by: Brian De Palma
- Screenplay by: Paul Schrader
- Story by: Brian De Palma; Paul Schrader
- Produced by: George Litto; Harry N. Blum
- Starring: Cliff Robertson; Geneviève Bujold; John Lithgow
- Cinematography: Vilmos Zsigmond
- Edited by: Paul Hirsch
- Music by: Bernard Herrmann
- Production company: Yellowbird Productions
- Distributed by: Columbia Pictures
- Release dates: August 1, 1976 (New York City, premiere); August 20, 1976 (United States)
- Running time: 98 minutes
- Country: United States
- Language: English
- Budget: $1.4 million (estimated)
- Box office: $4.5 million (rentals)

Obsession is a 1976 American psychological thriller film directed by Brian De Palma, starring Cliff Robertson, Geneviève Bujold and John Lithgow. The screenplay was written by Paul Schrader, from a story by De Palma and Schrader. The story is about prominent New Orleans businessman Michael Courtland who is haunted by guilt following the death of his wife Elizabeth and daughter Amy during a kidnapping-rescue attempt gone wrong. Years later, he meets and falls in love with Sandra Portinari, a young woman who is the exact look-alike of Elizabeth.

Both De Palma and Schrader have pointed to Alfred Hitchcock's Vertigo (1958) as the major inspiration for Obsession's narrative and thematic concerns. Schrader's script was extensively rewritten and pared down by De Palma before shooting, causing the screenwriter to proclaim a complete lack of interest in the film's subsequent production and release. The film also features one of the final scores of composer Bernard Herrmann, who died several months before its release.

Completed in 1975, Columbia Pictures picked up the distribution rights but demanded that minor changes be made to reduce potentially controversial aspects of the plot. When finally released in the late summer of 1976, it became De Palma's first substantial box-office success and received mixed reviews from critics.

== Plot ==
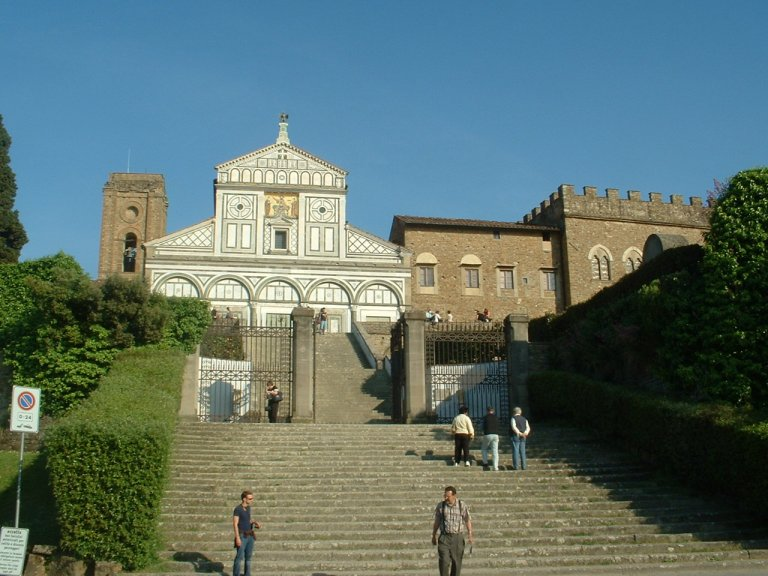
Facade of the basilica San Miniato al Monte in Florence, one of the primary settings of the film.

In 1959, Michael Courtland, a New Orleans real estate developer, has his life shattered when his wife Elizabeth and daughter Amy are abducted. The police recommend he provide the kidnappers with a briefcase of plain paper cut into dollars instead of the demanded ransom, as the kidnappers will then be more likely to surrender when cornered rather than flee with cash. Courtland accepts this plan, occasioning a bungled car chase and a spectacular explosion in which the kidnappers and victims perish. Courtland blames himself for his family's passing.

Sixteen years later, Courtland is obsessed with his late wife and often visits a monument he has had built in her memory, a replica of the church (the Basilica di San Miniato al Monte) in Florence, Italy, where the two of them first met. His business partner Robert LaSalle convinces Courtland to tag along on a work trip to Florence. While there, Courtland revisits the church and finds a young woman named Sandra Portinari who resembles his late wife. The already slightly unhinged Courtland begins to court Sandra and subtly attempts to transform her into Elizabeth's duplicate.

Courtland returns to New Orleans with Sandra so they can marry. On their wedding night, Sandra is kidnapped and a note left by her abductors is a replica of the kidnappers' message sixteen years earlier. This time, Courtland decides to deliver the ransom though it will drive him to ruin, withdrawing massive amounts from his accounts and holdings and signing over his interest in the real estate business to LaSalle. This leads him to the discovery that everything, including the original kidnapping, had been engineered by LaSalle to control Courtland's fortune, and that Sandra, now on her way to Rome with her payoff, was in it from the beginning. The now nearly insane Courtland stabs LaSalle to death and rushes to the airport, intending to kill Sandra.

Meanwhile, it is revealed through flashbacks as LaSalle rushes Sandra to the airport that she is Courtland's daughter, Amy. Following the original kidnapping, LaSalle concealed Amy's survival and sent her to dwell in secret with an Italian caretaker who raised her as her own. Throughout the years, LaSalle deceived Sandra about Courtland, convincing her Courtland failed to furnish the ransom as he did not love her enough. Sandra, who has come to love Courtland, writes a note to her father and takes a pair of cuticle scissors to the washroom and slits her wrists, attempting suicide. The plane returns to the airport, intercutting between Courtland, striding toward the gate, and Sandra, wrists bound, being pushed along the concourse to the terminal by an attendant.

Courtland spots Sandra and runs at her, gun drawn. A security guard attempts to halt him, but Courtland hits out with the money-laden briefcase, spilling its contents. Sandra, seeing the fluttering bills, stands, runs toward him smiling and leaps into his arms, crying "Daddy! You came with the money!" She kisses him, calling "Daddy" over and over as Courtland looks at her, first in bewilderment and finally in comprehension, as he calls her Amy and smiles.

== Cast ==
Credits from the AFI Catalog of Feature Films:

- Cliff Robertson as Michael Courtland
- Geneviève Bujold as Elizabeth Courtland / Sandra Portinari
- John Lithgow as Robert LaSalle
- Sylvia "Kuumba" Williams as Judy
- Wanda Blackman as Amy Courtland
- J. Patrick McNamara as the Kidnapper
- Stanley J. Reyes as Inspector Brie
- Nick Freiger as Farber
- Stocker Fontelieu as Dr. Ellman
- Don Hood as Furguson
- Andrea Esterhazy as D'Annunzio
- Tom Felleghy as Italian Businessman
- Nella Simoncini Barbieri as Signora Portinari
- John Creamer as the Justice of the Peace
- Regis Cordic as a Newscaster
- Loraine Despres as Jane

== Production ==
=== Writing and casting ===
Brian De Palma and Paul Schrader devised a story with a narrative inspired by Alfred Hitchcock's Vertigo, a film both admired. Schrader's original screenplay, titled Déjà Vu, was reportedly much longer than the final film, with a coda that extended another 10 years beyond where the film now ends. De Palma ultimately found Schrader's screenplay unfilmable due to its length, and rewrote and condensed the finale after Schrader refused to make the requested changes. According to De Palma, "Paul Schrader's ending actually went on for another act of obsession. I felt it was much too complicated, and wouldn't sustain, so I abbreviated it." Bernard Herrmann, the film's composer, agreed that the original ending should be jettisoned, telling De Palma after reading Schrader's version "Get rid of it — that'll never work". Schrader remained resentful of De Palma's rewrite for years and claimed to have lost all interest in the project once the change was made. Schrader indicated that "the original three-part story conclude with a section set in the future (1985). My original idea in the script was to write an obsessive love where transcended the normal strictures of time."

De Palma said "It made Schrader very unhappy: he thought I'd truncated his masterpiece. He's never been the same since." Schrader stated that "the future section was cut from the script for budgetary reasons"; however rumor had it that Bernard Herrmann suggested the cuts when he was working on the score for the film because he felt the last third set in the future didn't work. In 2011, Schrader's full three-part script was released as part of the Arrow Video Blu-ray.

In the documentary De Palma, the director indicated that he felt the major flaw of the film was in casting Cliff Robertson. De Palma felt that Robertson couldn't play the anguish of the character, and was frequently difficult on-set. De Palma was effusive in his praise of Bujold who he felt had the more difficult role, which she played admirably, giving the film the emotional resonance needed for the project.

=== Filming ===
Principal photography took place at locations in Florence, New Orleans, and Los Angeles. While they were able to film outside the San Miniato al Monte, the producers were unable to secure permission to shoot inside the real church, which were instead filmed at the Collegiata di Santa Maria Assunta near Siena.

The "Courtland Mansion" scenes were filmed at Colonel Short's Villa in New Orleans, an Italian Renaissance-style residence designed by Henry Howard and constructed in 1859. Courtland's memorial park was shot at Pontchartrain Park. Courtland's corporate offices were shot at One Shell Square (now the Hancock Whitney Center).

The climatic sequence was filmed at Los Angeles International Airport.

=== Editing ===
Columbia executives expressed unease over the incest theme, especially as it was portrayed in such a heavily romanticized manner. Consequently, a few minor changes were made to a pivotal sequence between Robertson and Bujold, in which dissolves and visual "ripples" were inserted over the wedding and post-wedding scenes to suggest that the consummation of their marriage only took place in a dream sequence. Paul Hirsch, the film's editor, agreed with the decision to obscure the incest theme, noting "I thought it was a mistake to drag incest into what was basically a romantic mystery, so I suggested to Brian 'What if it never happened? What if instead of having them get married, Michael only dreams of getting married? We have this shot of Cliff Robertson asleep. We could use that and then cut to the wedding sequence.' And that's what we did. It became a projection of his desires rather than actual fact."

=== Music ===
Obsession was Bernard Herrmann's second and final collaboration with De Palma. It was one of two films he scored in 1975, the other being Taxi Driver, before his death on Christmas Eve 1975. Both films were released posthumously.

After the film was completed, Herrmann considered it the finest film in his musical career.

== Reception ==
=== Box office ===
The film was an unexpected financial success. Columbia held on to the movie for almost a year before sending it into theaters in late August, traditionally the "dog days" of movie attendance. Obsession had managed to obtain enough positive critical notices to spark interest, and it earned the distributor over $4 million in domestic (U.S. and Canada) rentals.

=== Critical response ===
Initial critical reaction to Obsession was mixed. Roger Ebert wrote "Brian De Palma's Obsession is an overwrought melodrama, and that's what I like best about it...I don't just like movies like these; I relish them. Sometimes overwrought excess can be its own reward. If Obsession had been even a little more subtle, had made even a little more sense on some boring logical plane, it wouldn't have worked at all." Variety's review described it as "an excellent romantic and non-violent suspense drama...Paul Schrader's script...is a complex but comprehensible mix of treachery, torment and selfishness..." In Time, Richard Schickel called the film "...exquisite entertainment...The film also throws into high melodramatic relief certain recognizable human truths: the shock of sudden loss, the panic of the effort to recoup, the mourning and guilt that blind the protagonist to a multitude of suspicious signs as he seeks expiation and a chance to relive his life. In a sense, the movie offers viewers the opportunity to do the same thing—by going back to a more romantic era of the cinema and the simple, touching pleasures denied the audience by the current antiromantic spirit of the movies." Other reviewers praised the stylish cinematography by Vilmos Zsigmond, and Bernard Herrmann's beautiful, highly romantic score was one of the more acclaimed in his distinguished career, earning him a posthumous Academy Award nomination (the composer died in December 1975, a few hours after completing the score of Martin Scorsese's Taxi Driver). The National Board of Review named Obsession one of the Top Ten Films of 1976.

But several critics complained that the film was all too clearly a mere homage to Vertigo, without being original or interesting enough in itself as a thriller. Pauline Kael, normally one of De Palma's greatest admirers, dismissed the film as "no more than an exercise in style, with the camera whirling around nothingness..." Vincent Canby wrote "To be blunt, Obsession is no Vertigo, Hitchcock's witty, sardonic study of obsession that did transcend its material, which wasn't all that bad to start with. The Schrader screenplay...is most effective when it's most romantic, and transparent when it attempts to be mysterious...The plot...is such that you'll probably have figured out the mystery very early."

Decades later, Obsession's reputation improved considerably. Rotten Tomatoes lists the film as having a 77% favorability rating, based on the critiques of a sampling of 30 reviewers. The site's consensus reads: "Obsession suffers in comparison to the Alfred Hitchcock masterpiece that it mirrors, but director Brian De Palma's unique preoccupations give this thriller its own compulsive, twisted fingerprint".

== Soundtrack ==
The CD soundtrack composed and conducted by Bernard Herrmann is available on Music Box Records label. Disc one presents "The Film Score" and disc two, "The Original 1976 Soundtrack Album". "complete film score" was recorded by the City of Prague Orchestra and Chorus, conducted by Nic Raine (Tadlow 2015). It includes a second disc Blu-ray CD recording of the session.
