= Dean Koontz's Frankenstein =

Series of five novels

Dean Koontz's Frankenstein is the collective title of five novels co-written by Dean Koontz. Though technically of the mystery or thriller genres, the novels also feature the trappings of horror, fantasy, and science fiction.

The first three books form a trilogy: Prodigal Son, co-written with Kevin J. Anderson, was published in 2004; City of Night, co-written with Ed Gorman, was published in 2005; and Dead and Alive, written without a co-writer, was released on July 28, 2009. (At the same time that the final novel's authorship was confirmed, having previously been slated as by Dean Koontz & Ed Gorman, Koontz's "collaborators" on the earlier novels were retrospectively removed as co-authors, and all new editions of the novels are credited as by Dean Koontz alone.)

A fourth novel, Lost Souls, was published in May 2010, and a fifth, The Dead Town, was released on May 24, 2011. Although it was originally announced that the fourth, fifth and sixth novels would form a second trilogy, the cover for The Dead Town states it is the final volume.

== Premise ==
The series is supposedly a modern updating and sequel of the mythology of Mary Shelley's 1818 novel Frankenstein; or, The Modern Prometheus, although the similarities are mainly superficial. Set in present-day New Orleans, the series follows the activities of Victor Frankenstein, now known as Victor Helios, as he continues to create new life forms for his own purposes. Opposed to his activities are a pair of homicide detectives and Frankenstein's original monster, now known as Deucalion.

While the original Monster was made with parts from dead humans, Victor Frankenstein is now using modern technology to create more creatures, particularly synthetic biology. The new race he is making is constructed and designed from the bottom-up, and can be seen as bio androids, artificial humans made of flesh. Their knowledge and behavior is even based on programs downloaded directly into their brain, which appears to be an advanced wetware computer.

== Characters ==
=== Carson O'Connor ===
One of the primary characters of the series, Carson is a tough and occasionally brutal detective whose best friend is a fellow officer, Michael Maddison. She is the caretaker of her autistic brother, Arnie, whose condition is a more significant part of the story. Carson has a penchant for brute force and firepower, but it is her obvious compassion as she cares for Arnie that prompts Deucalion to come to her for aid in hunting his creator. Although initially sceptical, she quickly comes to accept Deucalion's story, quickly putting together the various reasons why Victor Frankenstein would be in New Orleans rather than Europe, such as the more advanced medical practices and technologies, and the abundance of raw material.

She and Michael Maddison provide the humor of the story. While Carson acts as the "straight man" of the duo, Michael often plays the role of her foil, his flippant personality bouncing off her very serious one.

Carson has feelings for her partner, Michael, although she hides it because she does not want their personal lives interfering with their professional lives. That, and she does not think that the middle of an apocalypse is the perfect time to talk about love.

Her father was killed on the job and it has been hinted by conversations between her and her partner that it was covered up, with evidence suggesting that he was a dirty cop even as Carson is convinced that the evidence is too neat for it to be anything but a frame. It was later confirmed that Helios killed her father when he came too close to the truth, although Carson dismisses Helios's claims that her father begged for his life, stating that he would have demeaned himself to save her mother but would have faced his own death with courage.

In the 2004 TV movie Carson was played by Parker Posey.

=== Michael Maddison ===
Carson's partner and fellow homicide detective, Michael has a habit of making wry observations about any situation: at one point, Carson considers the possibility of the Apocalypse coming because "he [Michael] had been struck speechless twice in one hour".

Michael is the more imaginative of the two; he adjusts rather quickly to Deucalion's revelation, with very little evidence, that Victor is plotting to overthrow the Old Race (the term Victor Helios has applied to all humans who have not been produced in his laboratory). His adjustment may stem more from his love of Carson than actual belief.

Michael pines for a less-professional relationship with Carson. This is very similar to the (initial) relationship between the two police partners in Koontz's Darkfall.

In the 2004 TV movie Michael (renamed Michael Sloane) was played by Adam Goldberg.

=== Victor "Helios" Frankenstein ===
Victor Frankenstein, having applied his own research to extending his own mortality, is now known to the world as Victor Helios. To the public, Helios is a philanthropic millionaire and a beneficiary to mankind. In reality, he has experienced much in the two hundred years that have passed since he created a man from fragments of the corpses of criminals. However, in secret, Helios has become obsessed with overthrowing true humans, which he refers to as "the Old Race", and replacing them with his superior creations. After the failure of his first rebellious monster, he put himself through extensive bodily modifications to extend his life span and increase his physical power (the details are unknown, but it is hinted he used a method similar to that which created the monster, possibly replacing organs from healthy victims over the years). This process has left his physical form scarred and deformed. Helios has acquired wealth and power from selling his knowledge to, among others, Adolf Hitler, Joseph Stalin, and the People's Republic of China. He respected Hitler and was greatly grieved at the end of World War II. He performed the life-extending surgery for Stalin, which went wrong and led to the dictator's insanity and assassination by fearful underlings.

In modern times, Helios has learned to create genetically-engineered beings, called the New Race, devoid of morality, feelings, and pain, unable to deny his command or attack him, focused on his own goals for them while lacking the ability to create or imagine anything beyond this life and their roles. He believes he has given them a perfect existence, but the horror of their protracted but meaningless lives has left many suicidal; a genetically-imprinted proscription prevents them from killing themselves or venting their rage by hurting or killing others, forcing them to find "loopholes" such as a butler gnawing his own fingers off so that Helios will destroy him as useless. Helios desires to remake the world in the image of Huxley's Brave New World, incapable of acknowledging that his creations are destroying themselves or being driven mad because they cannot cope with the inability to grow beyond their pre-programmed limits and be more than what he wants them to be. Additionally, he is a sexual sadist and a militant atheist, beating Erika to reinforce his own sense of power and violently certain that there is nothing supernatural in the world or anything that he cannot understand. At the end of the third book he was finally killed following the destruction of his farms, with most of the new race dying along with him (The reasoning behind this is that if he cannot become a god, he refused to let his creations outlast their creator) with only a few remaining. Unknown to all, he had created a clone of himself, who has the same goal as his original but considers himself to be as foolish as the humans he tries to replace. He created a new batch that call themselves "The Community", and after seeing his plans of human extinction come to pass, he intends to kill the community and at last himself believing the world will be not existing anymore if there is no beholder.

He is naturally extremely arrogant, which has resulted in a degree of carelessness and inability to realize his own failures, continuing to create his creatures with the same programmed beliefs about the nature of existence simply because he believes it, failing to recognise that his creatures "self-destruct" because of the spiritual void in their existences and dismissing his "failures" as just mistakes in the equipment. For this reason in the second book the programing to prevent killing of humans is breaking, and two of his creations have experienced severe mutations.

In the TV movie Helios was played by Thomas Kretschmann.

=== Deucalion ===
Helios's first disastrous creation and monster. Unlike his other creations, the hulking and highly intelligent Deucalion (a name he gives himself later) believes that the singular nature of his genesis—animation via a lightning bolt—gave him a soul, though this is never a fact that he confirms, believing that would be an act of blasphemy. Another interesting byproduct is Deucalion's innate understanding of "the quantum nature of the universe", which allows him to teleport vast distances instantly and make objects (thus far, only coins) disappear and reappear at will. In Koontz's continuity, when the monster attempted to attack Frankenstein, the doctor activated a small bomb he had implanted inside his creation's head as insurance against treachery; though Deucalion was not killed, half of his face was badly deformed and heavily scarred. After the events in Mary Shelley's book, he fled to America and gradually became the man he is today, hiding in carnival sideshows and eventually leaving for a Tibetan monastery to find peace. He remained there for several years, befriending a number of the monks, one of whom attempted to reduce the severity of the artificial man's scars by concealing them with intricate tattoos. After learning from an old friend that his creator is alive, Deucalion returns to New Orleans, where he eventually recruits assistance from Carson and, through her, Maddison.

The character shares his name with Deucalion, a figure from Greek mythology, who was the son of Prometheus (Shelley's subtitle for her novel was "The Modern Prometheus"). Deucalion chose the name for precisely this reason. Deucalion is also the Greek mythological equivalent of Noah, and restarted the human race after the flood.

Deucalion's disappearing coin trick also appeared in Koontz's From the Corner of His Eye.

Deucalion it seems, like his other fictional counterparts, has a dark and murderous past. An example of this is the fact that he murdered Helios's first wife, Elizabeth, when Helios was still Frankenstein (not Helios's New Race wives, Erikas 1–5). He desires redemption and believes it is his destiny/duty to kill his creator. The irony of this is that he, like the others of his "race", cannot kill Helios personally, although he lacks the restrictions on killing that Helios has placed in later creations and can therefore kill anyone else, whether of the Old Race or New Race, without complications.

In the film Deucalion is played by Vincent Pérez.

=== Erika(s) I–V ===
The synthetic wife Helios created for two reasons: publicly, she serves to keep Victor from having to deal with the attentions of Old Race women who would try to "land" him as part of their own quest for status and power; privately, she exists for little more than Helios' sexual gratification. Designed to be completely devoted to him, his misogyny has resulted in brutal "terminations" of the past four Erikas for failures ranging from outright rebellion to exhibitions of free will. A sexual sadist, he deliberately designs the Erika models with specific "defects" (such as the "vulnerabilities" of shame, pain and strangulation), and he takes great pleasure in beating them during sex. Erika IV read extensively, such as Emily Dickinson or Charles Dickens, leading her to question her husband's plans due to her inability to reconcile the "inferiority" of the Old Race with their ability to create such incredible works of art or commit such noble acts as sacrificing themselves for those they love.

As a result, she was recruited by Karloff, an experimental disembodied head that could psychically control an unattached hand from afar, to kill Helios. When she revealed she could not kill him, Karloff fell into despair and requested death, so she turned off his life support. Video recording tipped Victor to these actions, causing him to beat and strangle her. She stated that she forgave him for killing her but not for making her.

As a result of her predecessor's book-inspired independence, Erika V is forbidden to read, but her thoughts are filled with literary allusions because various snippets were programmed into her mind because Victor felt it necessary for her to have some general "literary" knowledge for light conversation (Although these details are relatively limited, such as her knowing that Romeo and Juliet were prominent lovers in fiction without knowing how their story ended).

In the film Erika is played by Ivana Miličević.

=== Jonathan Harker ===
A renegade member of the New Race who was implanted by Victor Helios into the police force. In an effort to find what enabled humans to feel happiness, he became a serial killer and desecrated his victims' corpses in a futile effort to find a happiness "gland" or other physical organ, believing that the Old Race had never identified such a gland simply because they were too inferior to recognize it as such. Because of some unknown factor, a mass grows in him throughout the first book, until he fell off a building in a gun battle with Maddison and Carson. This mass develops into a smaller yet mature version of himself which burst forth from his torso and escaped. In the second book, it appears to Erika V. (Note his name is a reference to the character in Dracula.) Jonathan Harker also had a partner in the police force by the name of Dwight Frye (which is also another reference to classic monster movie lore).

In the 2004 telefilm, Harker was played by Michael Madsen.

=== Werner ===
A member of the New Race. Helios experimented with grafting cockroach and feline DNA onto the basic New Race genome, intending to build Werner's physical resilience and various other "improvements". Werner, the security chief at the Hands of Mercy, was "such a solid block of muscle that even a concrete floor ought to have sagged under him. His only imperfection was the uncontrollable snot that would come every once in a while. The mucous membranes in his sinuses produced mucus at a prodigious rate. On those occasions, Werner often went through three boxes of Kleenex per hour." While searching Randal Six's room after Randal's escape, he started to mutate at a nearly-explosive rate with no catalyst that Helios could discern. He experienced many physical changes, making him an even bigger setback in Victor's future plans. Escaping his prison he melted other members of the New Race into himself starting with full bodies but changing to integrate the brains only.

=== Jocko ===
Originating as a tumor growing from within and later bursting out of Harker, the physically hideous troll has metamorphosed into a form free from Helios's control. It supposedly hides in sewers, and eventually shows itself to Erika during book three. They later form a mother and son relationship. It chooses the name Jocko for itself, has a scary smile, talks like a small child. It becomes an expert computer hacker with a passion for hats with bells. In the end of the series, Jocko ends up becoming the host of a popular children's television show called Jumpin' With Jocko.

=== Jelly Biggs ===
The "Fat Man" of a circus freak-show, and one of Deucalion's few friends. He lives in the Luxe Theatre with the "monster", reading mystery novels and helping keep the operation running.

=== Randal Six ===
A New Man created to be autistic so Helios could conduct experiments on the syndrome with the hopes of being able to control the condition to create highly focused workforce and organic machines (both of which, because of the degree of the condition, would be highly focused on tasks). Cursed with a wide variety of mental illnesses including OCD and agoraphobia, Randal Six escapes his cell to seek out Arnie, whom he saw in a news clipping, apparently very happy. Randal Six determines that the young boy holds the key to happiness, something missing from the lives of all the New Race. Upon reaching the home of Carson and Arnie, Randal attacks Carson's roommate and tries to forcibly "join" Carson's family. He later died when Carson shot him.

== Adaptations ==
=== Television ===
The concept for the series was adapted from a treatment written by Koontz and Anderson for the 2004 TV movie Frankenstein, which was produced for the USA Network. Koontz withdrew from the project over creative differences with the network, and the production continued in a different direction with similar characters and a modified plot.

In 2012, it was announced that TNT would create a television series which would adapt all five of the novels. James V. Hart, screenwriter of Bram Stoker's Dracula, was to write the project with his son Jake Hart.

=== Comics ===
The series is also being adapted into comic books published by Dabel Brothers Productions.

=== Unmade Film ===
In 2010, it was announced that 1019 Entertainment would develop the series into a feature film.

== See also ==
- Elizabeth Harvest – a 2020 film about a cloned wife with plot similarities
