= Prodigal Son (novel) =

2005 novel by Dean Koontz

- Author: Dean Koontz
- Language: English
- Series: Dean Koontz's Frankenstein
- Genre: Suspense, Horror novel
- Publisher: Bantam Books
- Publication date: 2005
- Publication place: United States
- Media type: Print (Paperback)
- Pages: 512 pp
- ISBN: 0-553-58788-9
- OCLC: 57454871
- LC Class: CPB Box no. 2332 vol. 9
- Followed by: City of Night

Prodigal Son is a horror novel by the best-selling author Dean Koontz, released in 2005 by Bantam Books. The book is the first book released by Koontz in a series of five, entitled Dean Koontz's Frankenstein. The book was co-authored by Kevin J. Anderson.

== Plot ==
The basic plot follows New Orleans detective Carson and her partner Michael on the hunt for a serial killer dubbed "The Surgeon". Reports of this killer catch the attention of Deucalion, formerly known as The Monster, who believes his former master and maker, Dr. Victor Frankenstein, has returned. As the body count grows, the case takes a darker turn when Carson encounters Deucalion, pushing Carson and Michael on to the path of a 200-year-old mystery and evil that threatens more than just New Orleans.

== Development ==
The concept for the series was adapted from a treatment written by Koontz and Anderson for the 2004 TV movie Frankenstein, which was produced for the USA Network. Koontz withdrew from the project over creative differences with the network, and the production continued in a different direction with similar characters and a modified plot while Koontz was allowed to publish his own series.

== TV series ==
In October 2012, the production company 1019 Entertainment announced they had purchased the rights to the entire Koontz Frankenstein book series. Plans were announced to develop it as a television series for TNT with writer James V. Hart and his son Jake Hart scripting the project.
