= Ed Gorman (writer) =

American novelist (born 1941)

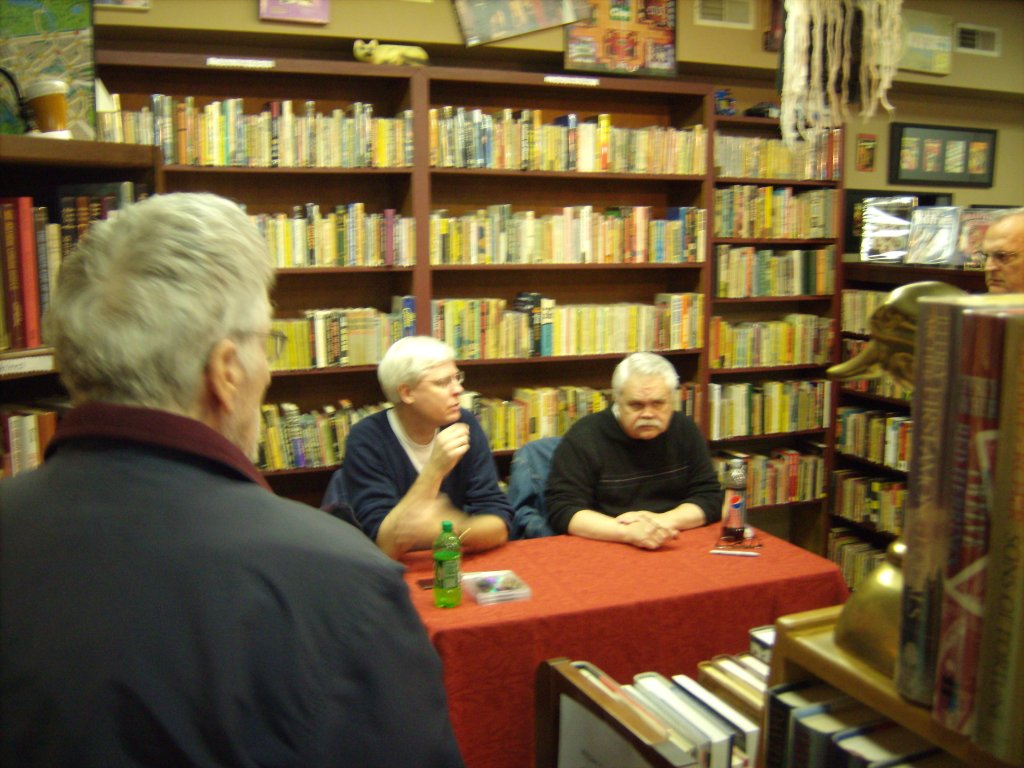
- Ed Gorman and Steven Philip Jones at MysteryCat Books
- Born: Edward Joseph Gorman Jr. November 2, 1941; Cedar Rapids, Iowa, U.S.
- Died: October 14, 2016 (aged 74); Cedar Rapids, Iowa, U.S.
- Occupation: Writer
- Writing career
- Pen name: Daniel Ransom, E.J. Gorman
- Period: 1984–present
- Genres: Mystery, horror fiction, western fiction, crime fiction
- Notable awards: Spur Award, Best Short Fiction (1992); Anthony Award, Best Critical Work, The Fine Art Of Murder (1994); Life Achievement Award from the Private Eye Writers of America; International Horror Writers Award

Edward Joseph Gorman Jr. (November 2, 1941 – October 14, 2016) was an American writer and short fiction anthologist. He published in almost every genre, but is best known for his work in the crime, mystery, western, and horror fields. His non-fiction work has been published in such publications as The New York Times and Redbook.

He contributed to many magazines and other publications, including Xero, Black Lizard, Mystery Scene, Cemetery Dance, and the anthology Tales of Zorro.

== Personal life ==
Gorman was born and grew up in Cedar Rapids, Iowa, where he spent much of his adult life as well. He lived for extended periods in Des Moines, Iowa; Minneapolis, Minnesota; and Chicago, Illinois. He was married twice, first to Catherine Anne Stevens for seven years. He next married Carol Gorman (née Maxwell), an award-winning children's and young adult author. They were married thirty-four years until his death in 2016.

== Writing career ==
After twenty-three years in advertising, public relations, writing political speeches and producing industrial films, Gorman published his first novel Rough Cut (1984). Soon after he quit his day job and dedicated himself to writing full-time (thanks to his wife Carol's full-time teaching job).

Gorman considered himself a genre writer. In the 1970s Gorman won a short story contest sponsored by Charles Scribner & Sons. An editor there suggested he expand his winning story into a mainstream novel, but Gorman gave up after six months, saying, “I was bored out of my mind. I am a genre writer.”

Gorman's novels and stories are often set in small Midwestern towns, such as the fictional Black River Falls, Iowa (the Sam McCain series), or Cedar Rapids, Iowa (The Night Remembers). For his Dev Conrad series, Gorman drew upon his years as a political operative.

Gorman was one of the founders of Mystery Scene magazine, and served as editor and publisher until 2002. His column, “Gormania,” continues to appear regularly in its pages.

In comics, he has written for DC, Dark Horse, and most recently Short, Scary Tales, which will be publishing adaptations of his novel Cage of Night (as Cage of Night) and the short story "Stalker" (as Gut-Shot).

Kirkus Reviews has called him "One of the most original crime writers around." The Bloomsbury Review noted: "He is the poet of dark suspense." The Oxford Book of American Crime Stories said: "His novels and stories provide fresh ideas, characters and approaches." Jon Breen at Ellery Queen's Mystery Magazine once noted, "Ed Gorman has the same infallible readability as writers like Lawrence Block, Max Allan Collins, Donald E. Westlake, Ed McBain, and John D. MacDonald."

Though Gorman was long considered to be a "prolific" writer, his pace of production slowed markedly after he was diagnosed with multiple myeloma in 2002; it was incurable but he fought it for 14 years.

== Awards ==
Work	Year & Award	Category	Result	Ref.
Turn Away	1988 Anthony Awards	Short Story	Finalist	
Stalkers (with Martin H. Greenberg)	1990 Locus Awards	Anthology	Nominated	
Prisoners	1991 Edgar Awards	Short Story	Shortlisted	
Cat Crimes (with Martin H. Greenberg)	1991 Anthony Awards	Short Story Collection/Anthology	Nominated	
The Face	1992 Spur Award	Short Fiction	Won	
The Face	1994 Locus Awards	Short Story	Nominated	
The Fine Art Of Murder: The Mystery Reader's Indispensable Companion (with Martin H. Greenberg & Larry Segriff)	1993 Agatha Award	Non-Fiction	Finalist	
The Fine Art Of Murder: The Mystery Reader's Indispensable Companion (with Martin H. Greenberg & Larry Segriff)	1994 Macavity Awards	Mystery Non-Fiction	Won	
The Fine Art Of Murder: The Mystery Reader's Indispensable Companion (with Martin H. Greenberg & Larry Segriff)	1994 Anthony Awards	Critical Work	Won	
Criminal Intent I (with Marcia Muller & Bill Pronzini)	1994 Anthony Awards	Short Story Collection/Anthology	Nominated	
One of Those Days, One of Those Nights	1995 Anthony Awards	Short Story	Finalist	
Cages	1995 Bram Stoker Award	Fiction Collection	Nominated	
Cages	1995 International Horror Guild Award	Collection	Won	
Cat Crimes Takes A Vacation (with Martin H. Greenberg)	1996 Anthony Awards	Short Story Collection	Nominated	
Speaking of Murder (with Martin H. Greenberg)	1998 Agatha Award	Non-Fiction	Finalist	
Speaking of Murder (with Martin H. Greenberg)	1999 Macavity Awards	Mystery Non-Fiction	Finalist	
The Dark Fantastic	2001 Bram Stoker Award	Fiction Collection	Nominated	
Star Colonies (with Martin H. Greenberg)	2001 Locus Award	Anthology	Nominated	
	2011 Shamus Award	Lifetime Achievement Award	Won	

== Adaptations ==
His novel The Poker Club was adapted as a film in 2008 by director Tim McCann. His short stories “The Long Silence After” and “The Ugly File” were adapted as short films. In 2016, rights to his novel Cage of Night and short story “Stalker” were bought for adaptation as graphic novels, to be published by Short, Scary Tales.

== Bibliography ==
=== Novels and short story ===
- Guild (1988)
- Graves' Retreat (1989)
- The Poker Club (1990)
- What the Dead Men Say (1990)
- Night Kills (1992)
- Cage of Night (1992)
- Wolf Moon (1993)
- Batman: I, Werewolf (1993)
- Cold Blue Midnight (1995)
- Black River Falls (1996)
- Shadow Games (1996)
- Cast in Dark Waters (with Thomas Piccirilli) (2002)
- Gun Truth (2003)
- The Midnight Room (2009)
- The Man From Nightshade Valley (with James Reasoner) (2012)
- The Prodigal Gun (with James Reasoner) (2012)
- Fast Track (with Bill Crider) (2014)
- Backshot (2015)

=== Short story collections ===
- Prisoners and Other Stories (1992)
- Cages (Deadline Press, 1995)
- Moonchasers and Other Stories (1996)
- Eye of the Beholder and Other Stories (1998)
- Famous Blue Raincoat (Crippen & Landru, 1999)
- Such a Good Girl and Other Crime Stories (2001)
- The Dark Fantastic (2001)
- Different Kinds of Dead and Other Tales (2005)
- The Collected Ed Gorman, Volume One: Out There in the Darkness (2007)
- The Collected Ed Gorman, Volume Two: The Moving Coffin (2007)
- The End of it All and Other Stories (Ramble House, 2009)
- Noir 13 (Perfect Crime Books, 2010)
- The Long Ride Back & Other Western Stories (Western Fictioneers Library, 2013)
- Scream Queen and Other Tales of Menace (Perfect Crime Books, 2014)
- A Disgrace to the Badge & Other Western Stories (2015)
- Shadow Games and Other Sinister Stories of Show Business (Short, Scary Tales, 2016)

=== Uncollected Short Stories ===
- Valentine from a Vampire (1988)
- Drifter (1989)
- The Man in the Long Black Sedan (1990)
- Killing Kate (1991)
- Dark Whispers (1991)
- Team Effort (1991)
- Selection Process (1991)
- Night Cries (1992)
- Trapped (1993) (With Dean Koontz
- Inside Job (1994)
- Long Ride Back (1994)
- Hunk (1994)
- Fathers, Inc. (1994)
- Playground (1994)
- A Little Something to Believe In (1995) (with Larry Segriff)
- The Man on the Third Floor (1996)
- Dirty Coppers (1997) (with Richard Chizmar)
- I Know What the Night Knows (1997)
- Track Down (1997)
- My Father's Son (1997) (with Larry Segriff)
- On the Run (1998)
- Legends (1999)
- The Gun Show (2000)
- Sailing to Atlantis (2001)
- Cast in Dark Waters (2002) (with Tom Piccirilli)
- The Cries (2002)
- Ghost of a Chance (2002)
- The Loneliest Night of the Week (2003)
- Unfinished Business (2004)
- Your World, and Welcome to It (2005)
- Stop or I'll Shoot (2005)
- Dead Man's Gun (2005)
- Drusilla (2007)
- Moral Imperative (2007)
- Hot Hot Hot (2007)
- The Baby Store (2008)
- Comeback (2009)
- Flying Solo (2013)
- Brothers (2016)

=== Series ===
Dev Conrad Series

1. Sleeping Dogs (Thomas Dunne Books, 2008)
2. Stranglehold (Minotaur Books, 2010)
3. Blindside (Severn House, 2012)
4. Flashpoint (Severn House, 2013)
5. Elimination (Severn House, 2015)

==== Jack Dwyer Series ====
1. Rough Cut (1985)
2. New Improved Murder (1985)
3. Murder Straight Up (1986)
4. Murder in the Wings (1986)
5. The Autumn Dead (1987)
6. A Cry of Shadows (1990)
7. What the Dead Men Say (1990)
8. The Reason Why (1992)
- The Dwyer Trilogy (1994) (a collection that includes The Autumn Dead, A Cry of Shadows, and the short story "Eye of the Beholder")

==== Tobin Series ====
1. Murder in the Aisle (1987)
2. Several Deaths Later (1988)

==== Jack Walsh Series ====
1. The Night Remembers (1991)

==== Robert Payne Series ====
1. Blood Moon (UK title Blood Red Moon) (1994)
2. Hawk Moon (1995)
3. Harlot's Moon (1998)
4. Voodoo Moon (2000)

==== Sam McCain Series ====
1. The Day the Music Died (1999)
2. Will You Still Love Me Tomorrow (2000)
3. Wake Up Little Susie (2001)
4. Save the Last Dance for Me (2002)
5. Everybody's Somebody's Fool (2004)
6. Breaking Up Is Hard To Do (2004)
7. Fools Rush In (2007)
8. Ticket to Ride (2009)
9. Bad Moon Rising (2011)
10. Riders on the Storm (Pegasus Crime, 2014)

==== Dean Koontz Frankenstein series ====
From Dean Koontz's Frankenstein series (they are co-authored by Dean Koontz):

- Book No. 2 City of Night

=== Pen name books ===
==== As E.J. Gorman ====
- The Marilyn Letters
- The First Lady
- Daughter of Darkness
- Senatorial Privilege

==== As Daniel Ransom ====
- Daddy's Little Girl (1985)
- Toys in the Attic (1986)
- Night Caller (1987)
- The Forsaken (1988)
- The Babysitter (1989)
- Nightmare Child (1990)
- The Serpent's Kiss (1992)
- The Long Midnight (1992)
- Fugitive Stars (1995)
- The Zone Soldiers (1996)

As Robert David Chase

- Graveyard
- Ghost Hunters
- Werewolf: A True Story of Demonic Possession

=== Graphic novels ===
- Kolchak: Dawn of the Demons (with Ricky Sprague) (Moonstone Books, 2016)
- Gut-Shot (based on the short story "Stalker," adapted by Ricky Sprague) (Short, Scary Tales, 2016)
- Cage of Night (based on the novel, adapted by Ricky Sprague) (Short, Scary Tales, 2016)

=== Anthologies ===
- The Black Lizard Anthology of Crime Fiction (1987)
- Westeryear (1988)
- Stalkers: 19 Original Tales By the Masters of Terror (1989) (with Martin H. Greenberg)
- Cat Crimes (1991) (with Martin H. Greenberg)
- Invitation to Murder (1991) (with Martin H. Greenberg)
- Dark Crimes 1 (1991)
- Solved (1991) (with Martin H. Greenberg)
- Dark Crimes 2 (1993)
- Predators (1993) (with Martin H. Greenberg)
- An Anthology of Angels (1996) (with Martin H. Greenberg)
- Night Screams (1996) (with Martin H. Greenberg)
- Cat Crimes Through Time (1998) with Martin H. Greenberg
- Once Upon a Crime (1998) (with Martin H. Greenberg)
- The Big Book of Noir (1998) (with Martin H. Greenberg)
- The UFO Files (1998) (with Martin H. Greenberg)
- Murder Most Scottish (1999) (with Stefan R. Dziemianowicz)
- Star Colonies (2000) (with Martin H. Greenberg & John Helfers)
- The World's Finest Mystery and Crime Stories (5 annual anthologies, 2000-2004/2nd thru 5th anthologies done w/Martin H. Greenberg)
- The Blue and the Gray Undercover: All New Civil War Spy Adventures (2002)
- Wolf Woman Bay and 9 More of the Finest Crime and Mystery Novellas of the Year! (2007) (with Martin H. Greenberg)
- Between the Dark and the Daylight and 27 More of the Best Crime and Mystery Stories of the Year (2009) (with Martin H. Greenberg)
- Four Halloweens (2016) with Kealan Patrick Burke, Ray Garton & Norman Prentiss)

=== Non-Fiction ===
- The Fine Art of Murder: The Mystery Reader's Indispensable Companion (1993) (with Martin H. Greenberg & Larry Segriff)
- The Dean Koontz Companion (1994) (with Martin H. Greenberg)
- "They're Here …": Invasion of the Body Snatchers: A Tribute (1999) (with Kevin McCarthy)
