= Adam McLean =

Scottish writer

Adam McLean (born 7 March 1948 in Glasgow) is a Scottish writer on alchemical texts and symbolism. In 1978 he founded the Hermetic Journal which he published until 1992 during which time he also started publishing the Magnum Opus Hermetic Sourceworks, a series of 55 editions (to 2018) of key source texts of the hermetic tradition. From 2004 he began collecting tarot cards in order to document tarot art and built up a collection of 2500 items. In 2016 he set up the Surrealism Website in order to document surrealist painters. This currently shows the work of 100 surrealist artists. He also created a series of 20 video lectures on many facets of surrealist paintings. In 2017 he set up an art gallery The Studio and Gallery in Kilbirnie in North Ayrshire in order to promote the work of emergent and lesser-known artists. In 2023 McLean began publishing, in book form, his Alchemical Translations Series of translations of 16-18th Century German, Latin and French alchemical works previously unavailable in English. This project is intended to expand the public's perception of the richness of alchemical literature.

== Career ==
McLean developed an interest in alchemy in his youth which has continued throughout his life. Located in Glasgow, McLean accessed the wealth of alchemical texts located in The Ferguson Collection in Glasgow University Library, the Young Collection also in Glasgow, and the John Read Collection at University of St Andrews. From 1990 to 2002 McLean's work was supported through the Bibliotheca Philosophica Hermetica.

Aside from his prolific writing and publishing efforts, McLean has contributed to the study of alchemy through the collecting, cataloguing and archiving of alchemical texts; the creation of alchemical art and study courses; and the establishment of web resources that bridge the interests of scholars and esotericists.

== Influence ==
Since the early 1980s, Adam McLean has been credited as a pioneer in the resurgence of English language alchemical texts, creating a huge expansion in interest at both a scholarly and popular level. In 1995, he founded The Alchemy Website, greatly increasing the availability of alchemical texts and art for a general audience. John Granger named McLean as one of the three figureheads of modern alchemical influence alongside Carl Jung and Titus Burckhardt.

== Bibliography ==
- A Treatise on Angel Magic (Weiser Books, 2006) ISBN 1-57863-375-3
- A Commentary on the Mutus Liber
- The Alchemical Mandala (1989,2nd ed.2002)
- The Rosicrucian Emblems of Daniel Cramer
- Autobiography: A documentation of my life(2020) ISBN 979-866990-558-3

Magnum Opus Hermetic Sourceworks series

- No. 1. The Magical Calendar 1979
- No. 2. The Mosaical Philosophy - Cabala of Robert Fludd 1980
- No. 3. The Crowning of Nature 1980
- No. 4. The Rosicrucian Emblems of Cramer 1980
- No. 5. Hermetic Garden of Stolcius 1980
- No. 6. The Rosary of the Philosophers 1981
- No. 7. Amphitheatre Engravings of Khunrath 1981
- No. 8. Splendor solis 1981
- No. 9. The Key of Boehme 1981
- No. 10. The Revelation of Revelations 1981
- No. 11. Commentary on the Mutus liber 1982
- No. 12. Steganographia of Trithemius 1982
- No. 13. Fludd - Origin and Structure of Cosmos 1982
- No. 14. Goethe's Fairy Tale 1982
- No. 15. Treatise on Angel Magic 1982
- No. 16. The Paradoxical Emblems of Freher 1983
- No. 17. Heptarchia Mystica of John Dee 1983
- No. 18. Commentary on Chymical Wedding 1984
- No. 19. Alchemical Engravings of Mylius 1984
- No. 20. Dee - Five books of Mystical Exercises 1985
- No. 21. The Dream of Poliphilus 1986
- No. 22. Atalanta fugiens 1986
- No. 23. Kabbalistic Diagrams 1987
- No. 24. Divine Numbers and Divine Harmony 1997
- No. 25. Intellectual Cantilenae - Michael Maier 1997
- No. 26. The Hermaphrodite Child of the Sun and Moon 1998
- No. 27. Three Dreams on the Transmutation of Metals 2002
- No. 28. The Three Tables of D.A. Freher 2003
- No. 29. The Viatorium of Michael Maier 2005
- No. 30. The Pneumo-Cosmic manuscript 2005
- No. 31. The Three Tables of Man 2005
- No. 32. The Book of Distillation 2006
- No. 33. Seven Keys of Honoratus Marinier 2007
- No. 34. The Speculative Philosophy by Gerhard Dorn 2008
- No. 35. The Solidonius Manuscript 2008
- No. 36. On the Music of the Spheres by Robert Fludd 2009
- No. 37. Bonacina. The Preparation of Potable Gold 2009
- No. 38. The Allegory of Palombara 2009
- No. 39. Voarchadumia 2010
- No. 40. Aurora Consurgens 2011
- No. 41. Triangular Magical manuscript 2010
- No. 42. Scala philosophorum 2012
- No. 43. Thesaurus Mundi 2012
- No. 44. Cambriel - Lessons 2012
- No. 45. Great Book of Nature 2012
- No. 46. A Philosophical Discourse 2013
- No. 47. The Marrow of Alchemy 2013
- No. 48. Gualdi Philosophia Hermetica 2104
- No. 49. Teletes 2014
- No. 50. An Alchemist's Diary 2013
- No. 51. Generation and Operation 2014
- No. 52. The Virga Aurea 2015
- No. 53. The Philosopher's Head 2015
- No. 54. The Practice of the Green Lion 2015
- No. 55. The Book of Abraham the Jew 2015

Alchemical Translations Series

- No. 1. Monte Raphaim - The Morning Redness 2023 ISBN 979-8367218893
- No. 2. A Spagyric and Philosophic Revelation 2023 ISBN 979-8367732948
- No. 3. Allegory of the Lesser Countryman 2023 ISBN 979-8368319957
- No. 4. The True Practice of Nature 2023 ISBN 979-8370427725
- No. 5. Chymical Moonshine 2023 ISBN 979-8371082084
- No. 6. Pordage - Philosophical Epistle 2023 ISBN 979-8371112170
- No. 7. The Great Work - Grillot de Givry 2023 ISBN 979-8371593498
- No. 8. The Fountain of the Wise 2023 ISBN 979-8372265608
- No. 9. The Fountain of Bernard revealed 2023 ISBN 979-8373358620
- No. 10. The Masonic Philosophical Cross and Cubic Stone 2023 ISBN 979-8374519990
- No. 11. The Flower of Flowers and the Path of Paths 2023 ISBN 979-8374591705
- No. 12. 134 Woodcuts of chemical and alchemical apparatus 2023 ISBN 979-8374869651
- No. 13. Dicta Alani and the Mirror of Alchemy 2023 ISBN 979-8375493688
- No. 14. A hundred and twelve accounts of transmutations 2023 ISBN 979-8377055891
- No. 15. The Garden of Riches 2023 ISBN 979-8377744023
- No. 16. The Strange Guest - Gustav Meyrink 2023 ISBN 979-8378042760
- No. 17. Sunflower of the Wise and Four curious letters 2023 ISBN 979-8386191085
- No. 18. Webster - The Transmutation of Metals 2023 ISBN 979-8378868087
- No. 19. The Mirror of Philosophy 2023 ISBN 979-8378974573
- No. 20. The Allegory of John of the Fountain 2023 ISBN 979-8386182861
- No. 21. Arcanum arcanorum arcanissimum 2023 ISBN 979-8386297916
- No. 22. Heavenly Manna - Azoth and Fire 2023 ISBN 979-8386325855
- No. 23. The Magic Cave in Scotland 2023 ISBN 979-8386910693
- No. 24. An Alchemical Reading of the Song of Solomon 2023 ISBN 979-8388920621
- No. 25. An Allegorical Alchemical Journey to the East 2023 ISBN 979-8389114432
- No. 26. Dialogue between Chrysophilus and Theophrastus 2023 ISBN 979-8389866546
- No. 27. Philosophical Axiomata by George Ripley 2023 ISBN 979-8389979871
- No. 28. The Twelve Grades of Alchemy by J.D. Mylius 2023 ISBN 979-8390490181
- No. 29. The Birthing Bed of the Philosophers’ Stone - Nollius 2023 ISBN 979-8391551096
- No. 30. Discourse on the Philosophers’ Stone 2023 ISBN 979-8391783725
- No. 31. Two French Alchemical Allegories 2023 ISBN 979-8392107964
- No. 32. The Allegorical Discourse of Solinus Saltzthal 2023 ISBN 979-8392428786
- No. 33. The Book of the 22 Hermetic Leaves 2023 ISBN 979-8393111465
- No. 34. Alchemical Visions and Allegories 2023 ISBN 979-8394880650
- No. 35. First Book of Distillation - Della Porta 2023 ISBN 979-8396152588
- No. 36. The Philosophical Parergon - Nollius 2023 ISBN 979-8398091342
- No. 37. War of the Knights - Limojon 2023 ISBN 979-8398206678
- No. 38. Dialogue - Aegidius de Vadis 2023 ISBN 979-8398557183
- No. 39. Donum Dei - Samuel Baruch 2023 ISBN 979-8851899454
- No. 40. Banquet of the Sages 2023 ISBN 979-8852428318
- No. 41. Transformation of the Metals - Denis Zachaire 2023 ISBN 979-8853107755
- No. 42. Allegory - Eirenaeus Philalethes 2023 ISBN 979-8853223271
- No. 43. The Memorial of Alchemy - Pierre Vicot 2023 ISBN 979-8854445788
- No. 44. A Philosopher and a Peasant discuss Alchemy 2023 ISBN 979-8856189970
- No. 45. Transmutatory Alchemy - Timothy Willis 2023 ISBN 979-8857586228
- No. 46. Light out of Chaos - Louis Grassot 2023 ISBN 979-8860390577
- No. 47. The Play of Children and the Work of Women ISBN 979-8860773967
- No. 48. The Secret - Jodocus Grever 2023 ISBN 979-8862874334
- No. 49. The Metamorphosis of the planets - Monte-Snyders 2023 ISBN 979-8862340853
- No. 50. A Philosophical Riddle - Birkholz / Adamah Booz 2023 ISBN 979-8862962772
- No. 51. The guide to the chemical heaven - Jacob Toll 2023 ISBN 979-8864639061
- No. 52. Mercury’s Caducean Rod - William Yworth 2023 ISBN 979-8863755915
- No. 53. Centrum Naturae Concentratum - Ali Puli 2023 ISBN 979-8864579732
- No. 54. The Fate of the Alchemists 2023 ISBN 979-8865235002
- No. 55. A Cabalistic Fable - Monte Hermetis 2023 ISBN 979-8865541509
- No. 56. The Philosophical Bird-Catcher 2023 ISBN 979-8865576099
- No. 57. Truth of the Philosophers’ Stone asserted 2023 ISBN 979-8867448493
- No. 58. Chrysopoiea 2023 ISBN 979-8867472054
- No. 59. The Twelve Royal Palaces of Hermetic Wisdom - Fictuld 2023 ISBN 979-8868434631
- No. 60. The Mystical Cabbala of Nature - Fictuld 2023 ISBN 979-8870686370
- No. 61. The Pilot of the Living Wave 2024 ISBN 979-8872492344
- No. 62. Philosophia maturata 2024 ISBN 979-8873532810
- No. 63. Chaos - Fictuld 2024 ISBN 979-8874067250
- No. 64. The Open Ark 2024 ISBN 979-8874195595
