= The Canon's Yeoman's Tale =

Part of the Canterbury Tales

"The Canon's Yeoman's Tale" is one of The Canterbury Tales by Geoffrey Chaucer.

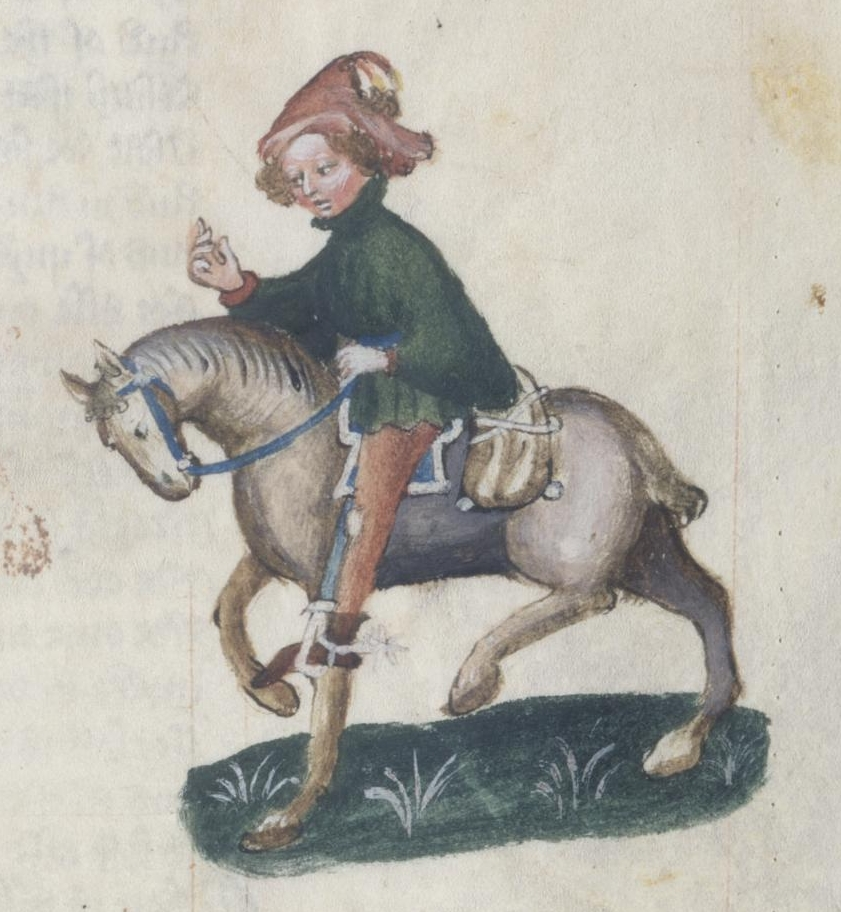
The Canon's Yeoman's Tale

The Canon and his Yeoman are not mentioned in the General Prologue of The Canterbury Tales, where most of the other pilgrims are described, but they arrive later after riding fast to catch up with the group. The tale the Canon's Yeoman tells is in two parts. The first part is an exposé of the shady business of his master the Canon as an alchemist. The second part is about another canon who is also an alchemist who is even more devious than the first.

It is not known if the introduction of these characters was an afterthought by Chaucer or if they were part of the design of the Tales from the start. It is believed it was one of the last tales to be written and it seems to many scholars that Chaucer must have had a real person in mind while writing such a lively attack on alchemists. In 1374 a chaplain called William de Brumley confessed to making counterfeit gold coins after being taught by William Shuchirch. Shuchirch was a canon at King's Chapel, Windsor, and in 1390 Chaucer supervised repairs of the chapel so he may have known Shuchirch.

No sources have survived for the tale although similarities can be found to one by Ramon Llull. Chaucer probably got much of the technical detail from Speculum Naturale (Mirror of Nature) by Vincent of Beauvais, and Arnold of Villanova is mentioned within the tale itself although he may have read many other alchemical texts. Chaucer's grasp of alchemy seems very accurate and in the 17th century the tale was cited by Elias Ashmole as proof that Chaucer was master of the science. Chaucer did have a great interest in science and technology, writing A Treatise on the Astrolabe.

== Synopsis ==
The Yeoman seems much the more talkative of the two arrivals. When Harry Bailly, the host, asks the Canon for a tale, his yeoman chips in to announce how clever his master is, saying:

That al this ground on which we been ridyng,
Til that we come to Caunterbury toun,
He koude al clene turnen up-so-doun,
And pave it al of silver and of gold.

The host then asks why the Canon is dressed so poorly if he is so clever and the Yeoman admits that he may have wit but he misuses it. He then explains his master is an alchemist:

And borwe gold, be it a pound or two,
Or ten, or twelve, or manye sommes mo,
And make hem wenen, at the leeste weye,
That of a pound we koude make tweye.

The Canon tries unsuccessfully to silence his Yeoman but ends up fleeing in shame; after which the Yeoman feels free to tell the history of the Canon. He describes how the Canon works to discover the philosopher's stone and many of the processes he goes through but how in the end the pot breaks and they lose most of the metal they had. He then continues with a story of a second canon who sells to a priest an alchemical 'crap' for producing silver after tricking him into believing that he can produce the metal spontaneously.

After each of the tales the Yeoman adds a moral such as:

But al thyng which that shineth as the gold
Nis nat gold, as that I have herd it told;

He also explains that we should not try to discover things kept secret as it will not succeed and be like picking a fight with God.

He wills that it not discovered be,
Save where it's pleasing to His deity...
...sith that God of hevene
Ne wil nat that the philosophres nevene
How that a man shal come unto this stoon,
I rede, as for the beste, lete it goon.

The Canon's Yeoman tells how he was once a happy man who wore fine clothing, but has now degraded into poverty – he must wear his stocking for a cap; he is so deep in debt that he can never repay loans no matter how long he lives or how "talented" he is; his face is grey and the colour of lead, implying that his pursuit of alchemy has left him suffering from lead poisoning and mortally ill.

== Influence ==
Ben Jonson's play The Alchemist bears many similarities to Chaucer's tale. Chaucer has also described him as wearing green at all times.
