= The Dead Town =

2011 novel by Dean Koontz

- Author: Dean Koontz
- Language: English
- Series: Dean Koontz's Frankenstein
- Genre: Suspense, thriller
- Publisher: Bantam Publishing
- Publication date: May 24, 2011
- Publication place: United States
- Media type: Paperback
- Pages: 448
- ISBN: 978-1441818447
- OCLC: 802297748
- Preceded by: Lost Souls

The Dead Town is the fifth and final novel of Dean Koontz's Frankenstein series.

== Releases ==
The book reached #1 on the New York Times Paperback Bestseller list.

Also, limited lettered and numbered hardcover editions were published by Charnel House.
