= Michael Maschka =

German painter

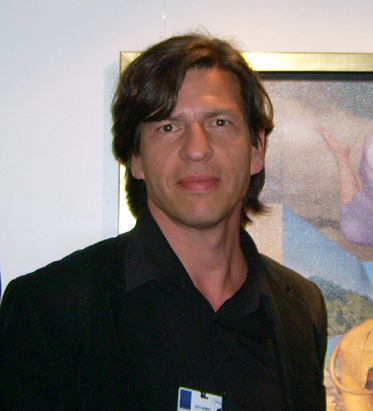
- Born: 1962 (age 63–64); Augsburg, Germany
- Style: Fantastic Realism
- Movement: Vienna School of Fantastic Realism

Michael Maschka (born 1962 in Augsburg) is a German painter, sculptor, graphic artist and designer. He is an artist of Fantastic Realism.

== Life ==
While growing up in Augsburg, Michael Maschka came into contact with Renaissance and Baroque art at an early age. Although he hardly received artistic impulses from his middle-class family environment he soon discovered his passion for drawing and painting. After he completed his artistic education at the Staatliche Fachoberschule Augsburg (technical college), Maschka went to Berlin in 1983. He began to study social pedagogy after he was rejected by the Berlin University of the Arts (UdK). This was his profession until 1993. At the same time he exhibited his works in Augsburg and Berlin. As a follower of Surrealism and Fantastic Realism he met his great idol the Austrian artist Ernst Fuchs, who was one of the founders of the Vienna School of Fantastic Realism, in 1994. Fuchs promoted Maschka. As his assistant Maschka worked with him on several projects such as the Fuchs' church in Thal near Graz. Since then he has participated in exhibitive projects in Europe and further afield. Until 2014 he was a member of "Dali's heirs", a group which was founded by Roger M. Erasmy in 2003, and celebrated successes in France and Germany with the Dali railway wagon. As one of the founders of Labyrinthe (Association for Phantastic and Visionary Arts, founded 2001), Michael Maschka has made it his goal to care for the life's work of Edgar Ende and to make it available to the public by means of exhibitions. In this framework he wants to bring young artists and promoters of Fantastic Realism together. Nowadays he lives in Nördlingen, Bavaria, Germany.

== Work ==
Michael Maschka is a representative of Fantastic Realism. The formal approach in his pictures is realistic and is influenced by the care that the Old Masters took. He meticulously applies the techniques of the Old Masters to underline the message in his pictures. The viewer should be beguiled by the puzzles that his fantastic pictures present and by the sensuality that is tangible. He uses the vocabulary of the visible reality to trace the invisible structures of a spiritual reality that he has perceived. The motif nudity which appears in many of his pictures does not represent a projection surface for sexuality but is a symbol for naturalness and vulnerability. The female figure appears in his pictures in the form of the anima, the unconscious side of the soul of the male. By means of painting and etching he tries to bring out the unveiled and vulnerable self and to present it pictorially. In doing so he wants to bring the inner and outer picture into harmony.

Maschka wants to sharpen the perception of the observer so that he looks behind the scenes of his personally constructed world. In his pictures Maschka often refers to motifs of German and Greek Mythology, because for him they include the universal language of the archetypes, a language which over thousands of years has remained uninfluenced by time and cultural influences and is understood intuitively by mankind. These motifs, that always rotate around the topics of destruction and renewal within nature or mankind, form a basic part of his pictorial language. This should lay bare conceptual approaches that have been long believed forgotten but have lived on in our subconscious. The symbolism of his pictures aims to cause the viewer to ponder and discover anew appreciation for the world that is not immediately available behind the visible reality.

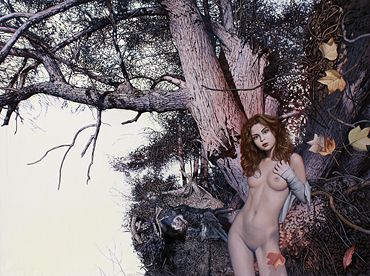
Nymph in the Forests

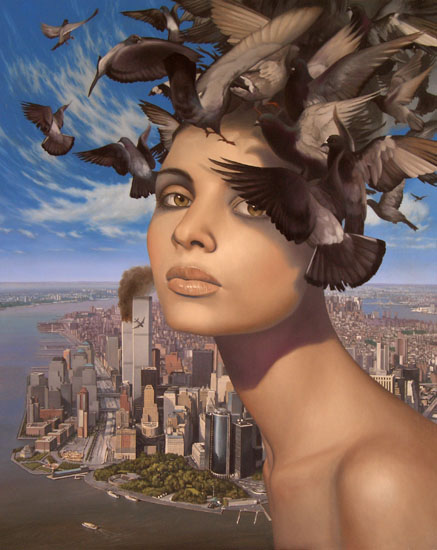
Air and Earth

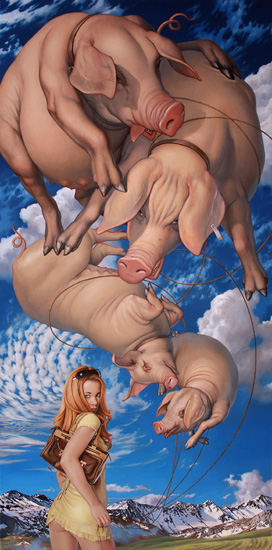
Flying Pigs

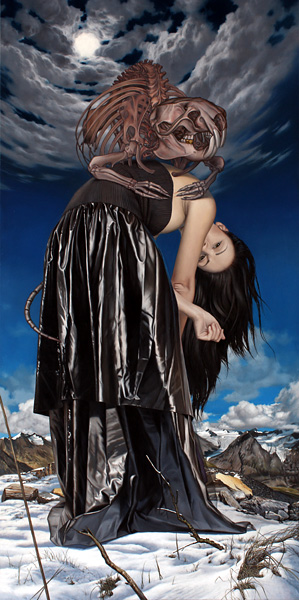
Death and the Girl

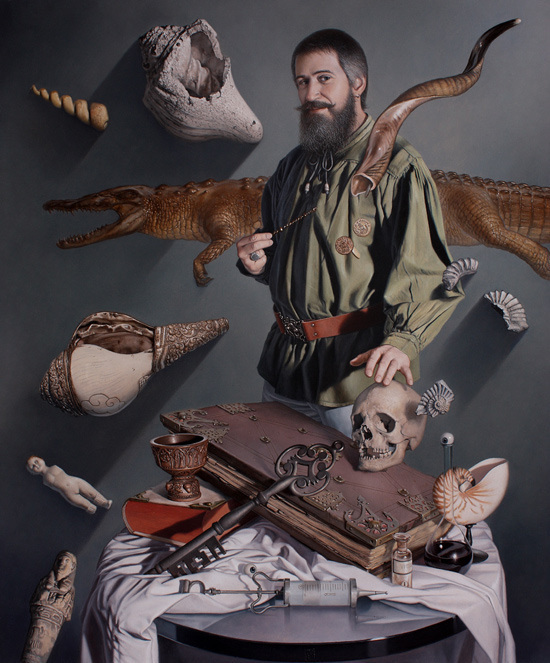
Portrait MM

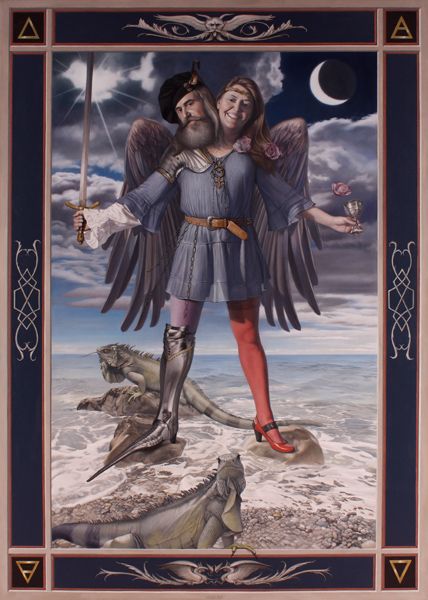
Hermaphrodite

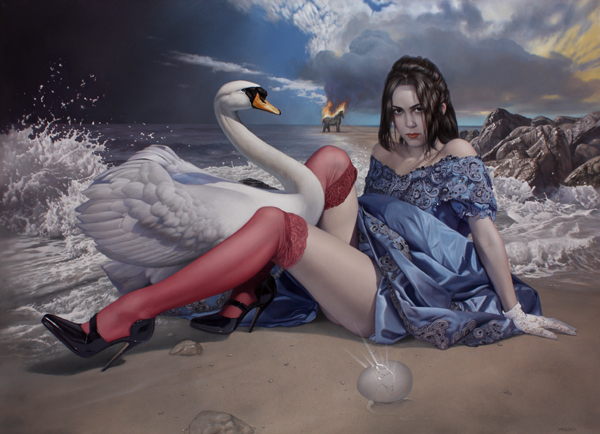
Leda and the Swan

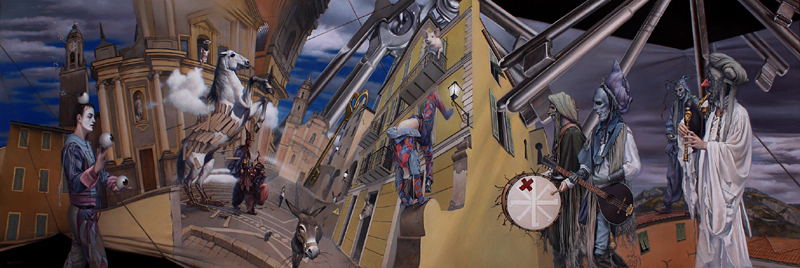
Trojan Horse

== Exhibitions (selection) ==
- 1994: Du Fantastique au Visionnaire, Le Zittele, Venice, Italy
- 1997: An den Quellen der Phantastik, Galerie Villa Rolandseck, Remagen, Germany
- 1998: Fantastic Realism, St. Petersburg Museum, Otaru, Japan
- 2001: Mythen – Bilder verborgener Welten, Schloss Honhardt, Baden Württemberg, Germany
- 2002: Parfums des femmes, 3. Biennale der Phantastischen Kunst, Saint-Germain-en-Laye, Paris, France
- 2002: The Hart Gallery, Palm Desert, California, USA
- 2003: Les héritiers de Dali, Espace Berthelot, Lyon, France
- 2005: Hommage an H. Ch. Anderson, Schloss Voergaard, Denmark
- 2005: Phantastische Welten, Zitadelle Spandau, Berlin, Germany
- 2006: Salon de l'art fantastique européen, Les Thermes, Le Mont Dore, France
- 2007: Dalis Erben malen Europa, Europäisches Parlament, Brussels, Belgium
- 2007: Apokalypse, Musee d'Art Fantastique de Brussels, Belgium
- 2008: Women of the world, Galerie Princesse de Kiev, Nice, France
- 2009: International Peace Art Exhibition, Palacio Pignatelli, Barcelona, Spain
- 2010: Plastica Narboria, Hotêl de Ville, Saint-Avold, France
- 2010: Le Grand Palais, Paris, France
- 2011: SAFE 2011, Le Mont-Dore, France
- 2011: PhantaMorgana, Rathaus Viechtach, Germany
- 2012: IMAGO-Phantastic Art, Schloss Riegersburg, Austria
- 2012: Dalis Erben, Phantastenmuseum Vienna, Austria
- 2013: Michael Maschka, Rathaushalle Kitzingen, Germany
- 2013: Dalis Erben, Grand Palais, Paris, France
- 2014: Ungleiche Geschwister, Trierenberg Art, Traun, Austria
- 2015: Zwischen den Welten, Galerie CALLAS, Bremen, Germany

== Awards ==
- 2007: Art Award of the City of Le Mont Dore, France
- 2010: Bronce Medal of Société des artistes français, Grand Palais, Paris, France

== Publications ==
- Vom Sehen zum Schauen, 1998 (Monography).
- Der Meisterträumer, 2015 (Novel), ISBN 978-39-575107-7-8
