= John Granger =

American academic

John Granger is a speaker and writer whose principal focus is the intersection of literature, faith, and culture. He is most well known as the author of several books analysing J.K. Rowling's Harry Potter novels. He writes a weblog called Hogwarts Professor.

== Focus ==
Described as "The Dean of Harry Potter Scholars" his specialisation is iconological literary criticism, reading at four layers: the surface, moral, allegorical, and sublime (anagogical). Writing about Harry Potter from this perspective, he introduced the 'Eliade thesis' to suggest a textual cause for Potter mania explaining Rowling's use of Christian Symbolism and Rowling's use of literary alchemy. Granger has demonstrated Rowling's use of 'ring composition' or chiasmus story scaffolding and eye symbolism in the Harry Potter novels, and argued that her eye symbolism in Deathly Hallows and the King's Cross scene Rowling describes as "the key" to the seven novels suggests her baseline theme is "transformed vision".

Granger brings the same literary criticism model to the allegorical and anagogical aspects of Stephenie Meyer's Twilight Saga, Suzanne Collins' Hunger Games trilogy and C. S. Lewis' Chronicles of Narnia.

He has been a featured speaker at Harry Potter conferences in Orlando, Las Vegas, Toronto, Los Angeles, Philadelphia, Illinois, San Francisco, Chicago, Chestnut Hill, Washington, D.C., St Andrews and Ottawa in addition to giving talks and classes on symbolist literature and iconological criticism at schools and other venues around the US. Granger has been a guest speaker at the Torrey Honors Institute at Biola University, California, Pepperdine, Washington & Lee, La Salle, Cornell, Penn, Yale, University of Chicago, Baylor, St Andrews, the Wade Center at Wheaton College, Loyola, Augustana, UNC, USC, the New York C. S. Lewis Society, New York Public Library, and the Past Watchful Dragons C. S. Lewis Conference. He has given more than 100 radio, newspaper, and television interviews and is featured in the A&E Special 'Secrets of Harry Potter' that is an Order of the Phoenix DVD Extra.

== Criticism ==
In respect to the Harry Potter series, Granger holds, contrary to several Christian critics of the series – including Berit Kjos and Richard Abanes – that the books' magic is incantational rather than invocational, and, as such, require and support a Christian worldview rather than undermine it. Granger has debated Abanes and Catholic Potter critic Michael O'Brien on the Christian content and value of Rowling's work.

Latter-day Saint critics of Granger's exploration of Stephenie Meyer's Mormonism and its place in her Twilight novels have dismissed his work as a cursory engagement with Mormonism, uncovering subtlety where none was intended, giving Meyer the benefit of doubts never demanded, and getting Mormon popular culture plain wrong. Granger has been defended by BYU Professor Steven Walker, who Stephenie Meyer has cited as the professor who had the greatest influence on her. Walker, who is also a believing Mormon, has commented that Granger has persuaded him that "Meyer's religious thought is so crucial to her fiction that to read it without consideration of the theology is to miss much of the point", and that Granger's work succeeds in deepening Christian's reading of theology, showing that readers enter fully into the stories because of religious depths and heights which the Twilight novels share with the best English literature.

== Works about Harry Potter ==
Granger first became interested in Harry Potter when his daughter was given a copy of Harry Potter and the Philosopher's Stone. He read the book with the intention of pointing out to his daughter what was wrong with it but instead was impressed by the Christian imagery, classical references, and 'acerbic criticism of muggledom'. Granger's interest grew through discussion with friends in the Port Townsend C. S. Lewis Society. He gave lectures on the subject at the Society and the town's Carnegie Library which lectures were eventually collected into a book, 'Hidden Key to Harry Potter' (Zossima Press, 2002). That book was re-written and re-titled first 'Looking for God in Harry Potter' (Tyndale, 2004, 2006) and now 'How Harry Cast His Spell' (Tyndale, 2008).

This book in its updated and revised forms argues that the Harry Potter novels are as popular as they are because of their traditional symbolism and spiritual content. Granger believes, following Mircea Eliade, that because forms of entertainment in a secular or profane culture serve a mythic and religious function; the most popular works will be those with transcendent imagery, structure, and meaning.

Granger taught Harry Potter courses on the online Barnes and Noble University and as a guest in their Book Clubs from 2004 to 2007. He has also appeared as a guest in favor of the Harry Potter books on several radio and TV shows, including CNN's Paula Zahn Now, MSNBC, and A&E's The Hidden Secrets of Harry Potter (which special is on the Harry Potter and the Order of the Phoenix DVD). Having been the first to note and explain the traditional alchemical and Christian imagery in the novels, he has become involved in the debate with those who criticize Ms. Rowling's novels, critics who believe the adventure stories encourage children to consider paganism and witchcraft as alternative faiths. In The Deathly Hallows Lectures, he explains the predominant eye symbolism of the series finale in light of Samuel Taylor Coleridge's natural theology and the consequent tradition of eye and mirror symbolism in Romantic literature.

== Works ==
- The Hidden Key to Harry Potter: Understanding the Meaning, Genius, and Popularity of Joanne Rowling's Harry Potter Novels (Zossima Press, 2002, ISBN 0-9723221-0-8)
- Looking for God in Harry Potter (Tyndale House, 2005, ISBN 1-4143-0091-3)
- Who Killed Albus Dumbledore? (Zossima Press, 2006, ISBN 0-9723221-1-6) – six essays, of which one is written by Granger, and the other five by five Harry Potter 'fan-theorists' (Wendy B. Harte, Sally M. Gallo, Daniela Teo, 'Swythyv', and Joyce Odell (or 'Red-hen')), and collected together by Granger. A proportion of the proceeds of the book are being donated to the Children's High Level Group, a charity co-founded by Rowling in 2005.
- Unlocking Harry Potter: Five Keys for the Serious Reader (Zossima press, 2007, ISBN 0-9723221-2-4)
- How Harry Cast His Spell: The Meaning Behind the Mania for J. K. Rowling's Bestselling Books (Tyndale, 2008, ISBN 978-1-4143-2188-2).
- The Deathly Hallows Lectures: The Hogwarts Professor Explains the Final Harry Potter Adventure (Zossima Press, 2008, ISBN 978-0-9723221-7-1)
- Harry Potter's Bookshelf: The Great Books behind the Hogwarts Adventures (Penguin/Berkley, 2009, ISBN 978-0-425-22979-8)
- Spotlight: A Close-Up Look at the Artistry and Meaning of Stephenie Meyer's Twilight Saga (Zossima Press, 2010, ISBN 978-0-9822385-9-2)
- Harry Potter as Ring Composition and Ring Cycle (Unlocking Press, 2012)

Other works (through written contribution or editing) include:

- Harry Potter Smart Talk (Unlocking 2011) Essay anthologies.
- Harry Potter and Philosophy (2010) Contributor.
- Harry Potter For Nerds (Unlocking, 2010) Contributor.
- Hog's Head Conversations (Zossima, 2008, ISBN 978-0-982238585). Contributor.
- Ravenclaw Reader (Unlocking, 2014). Keynote talk at St Andrews University is included in the conference anthology.

== See also ==
- Alchemy in art and entertainment
