= Dead and Alive (Koontz novel) =

2009 novel by Dean Koontz

- Author: Dean Koontz
- Language: English
- Series: Dean Koontz's Frankenstein
- Genre: Suspense, thriller
- Publisher: Bantam Publishing
- Publication date: 2009
- Publication place: United States
- Media type: Print (paperback)
- Pages: 352
- ISBN: 0-553-58790-0
- Dewey Decimal: 813/.54 22
- LC Class: PS3561.O55 D43 2009
- Preceded by: City of Night
- Followed by: Lost Souls

Dead and Alive is the third horror novel in the first trilogy of Dean Koontz's Frankenstein series. Originally intended to be co-authored by Ed Gorman and Dean Koontz, Koontz opted to write this entry alone.

== Plot ==
Deucalion, the legendary monster, is a heroic figure dedicated to battling the evil that gave him life. The megalomaniacal Victor Helios has, by design and accident, unleashed many of his engineered killers on modern-day New Orleans. Detectives Carson O'Connor and Michael Maddison are Deucalion's all-too-human partners trying to end the reign of terror of Helios's killers. A resistance movement also builds from within Helios' power structure, as many of his vat-made men and women recognize that to fight back against Helios would bring a desired end to tedium, slavery, insanity, self-destructive abuse behaviors or life itself.

== Release information ==
The long-awaited book was released on July 28, 2009. Koontz chose to delay the release for several years after Hurricane Katrina as he did not wish to release any further monsters or destruction on New Orleans.
