= Lost Souls (Koontz novel) =

2010 novel by Dean Koontz

- Author: Dean Koontz
- Language: English
- Series: Dean Koontz's Frankenstein
- Genre: Suspense, Thriller
- Publisher: Bantam Publishing
- Publication date: June 2010
- Publication place: United States
- Media type: Print (hardback)
- Preceded by: Dead and Alive
- Followed by: The Dead Town

Lost Souls is the fourth horror novel of Dean Koontz's Frankenstein series.

== Plot ==
The war against humanity has begun. Only now things will be different. Victor Leben, once Frankenstein, has not only seen the future—he's ready to populate it. Using stem cells, “organic” silicon circuitry, and nanotechnology, he will engender a race of superhumans—the perfect melding of flesh and machine. With a powerful, enigmatic backer eager to see his dream come to fruition and a secret location where the enemies of progress can't find him, Victor is certain that this time, nothing and no one can stop him.

It is up to five people to prove him wrong. In their hands rests nothing less than the survival of humanity itself. They are drawn together in different ways, by omens sinister and wondrous, to the same shattering conclusion: Two years after they saw him die, the man they knew as Victor Helios lives on. Detectives Carson O’Connor and Michael Maddison; Victor's engineered wife, Erika 5, and her companion Jocko; and the original Victor's first creation, the tormented Deucalion, have all arrived at a small Montana town where their old alliance will be renewed—and tested—by forces from within and without, and where the dangers they face will eclipse any they have yet encountered. Yet in the midst of their peril, love will blossom, and joy, and they will discover sources of strength and perseverance they could not have imagined.

== Release ==
The book was released in hardback on 15 June 2010. It debuted at #7 on the New York Times Hardcover Best Seller list. Book five, "The Dead Town," followed in May 2011.
