= City of Night (Koontz and Gorman novel) =

2005 novel by Dean Koontz and Ed Gorman

- Cover of City of Night
- Author: Dean Koontz and Ed Gorman
- Language: English
- Series: Dean Koontz's Frankenstein
- Genre: Suspense, Thriller
- Publisher: Bantam Publishing
- Publication date: 2005
- Publication place: United States
- Media type: Paperback
- Pages: 496
- ISBN: 0-553-58789-7
- OCLC: 61104637
- LC Class: CPB Box no. 2452 vol. 18
- Preceded by: Prodigal Son
- Followed by: Dead and Alive

City of Night is a novel released in 2005 by the best-selling author Dean Koontz and Ed Gorman. The book is the second in Koontz's series, entitled Dean Koontz's Frankenstein. The third book in the series, Dead and Alive, was published in 2009.

== Releases ==
Also in 2009, the three novels comprising the trilogy were collectively re-designated as being by Dean Koontz, with the second and future editions effectively airbrushing from history Gorman's contribution to the second installment.
