= Frankenstein (2004 film) =

Television film by Marcus Nispel

- Promotional release poster
- Genre: Science fiction; Horror
- Based on: Frankenstein by Mary Shelley
- Written by: John Shiban
- Directed by: Marcus Nispel
- Starring: Parker Posey; Vincent Perez; Thomas Kretschmann; Adam Goldberg; Ivana Miličević; Michael Madsen
- Theme music composer: Angelo Badalamenti
- Composer: Normand Corbeil
- Country of origin: United States
- Original language: English

Production
- Executive producers: John Shiban; Martin Scorsese; Tony Krantz
- Producer: Marcus Nispel
- Cinematography: Daniel Pearl
- Editor: Jay Friedkin
- Running time: 88 minutes
- Production companies: Lions Gate Films; L.I.F.T.; Flame Television

Original release
- Network: USA Network
- Release: October 10, 2004

Frankenstein is a 2004 American science fiction horror television film produced and directed by Marcus Nispel and written by John Shiban. Loosely inspired by Mary Shelley's Frankenstein; or, The Modern Prometheus, it stars Parker Posey as a police detective on the trail of a serial killer, played by Thomas Kretschmann, in present-day New Orleans. The detective is aided in her search by one of the killer's creations, played by Vincent Perez. Adam Goldberg, Ivana Miličević and Michael Madsen co-star.

Frankenstein aired on the USA Network on October 10, 2004. Intended as the pilot for an ongoing series, the planned show was initially deriving from a concept by Dean Koontz. USA and the producers ordered major changes from the concept, resulting in Koontz losing interest in the show in its new form and withdrawing association from the project, later creating a book series based on his initial pitch, entitled Dean Koontz's Frankenstein. Subsequently, executive producer Martin Scorsese also expressed desire to exit the series, before the project ultimately fell through.

== Premise ==
While investigating the murders of a serial killer who mutilates and removes the internal organs of the victims, two present-day New Orleans police detectives, Carson O'Conner and her partner Michael Sloane, learn that Victor Frankenstein, now calling himself Victor Helios, is still alive and has created a number of genetically-engineered creatures with the intent of building a legion of followers to assist in his overthrow of the Old Race (humans). However, his very first creation, the original Frankenstein monster, now calling himself Deucalion, is also alive and looking to kill his creator.

== Cast ==
- Parker Posey as Detective Carson O'Conner
- Vincent Perez as Deucalion
- Thomas Kretschmann as Dr. Victor Helios
- Adam Goldberg as Detective Michael Sloane
- Ivana Miličević as Erika Helios
- Michael Madsen as Detective Jonathan Harker
- Deborah Duke as Angelique
- Ann Mahoney as Jenna Parker
- Deneen Tyler as Kathleen Burke
- Brett Rice as Detective Dwight Frye
- Stocker Fontelieu as Patrick Duchaine
- Sandra Dorsey as Nancy Whistler

== Production ==
Filming took place in New Orleans. Cinematographer Daniel Pearl shot on Kodak Super 16 mm film with Arriflex 16 SR3 cameras.

== Reception ==
Sloan Freer of Radio Times gave the film two stars and said "though the ultra-stylised visuals create an air of brooding menace, they can't compensate for the patchy plotting or the abrupt and hugely unsatisfying finale." Brian Lowry of Variety praised the look saying "Even working on a made-for-TV budget, Nispel provides plenty of striking imagery, giving the film a truly distinctive look" and added "while the climax is somewhat disappointing, the brisk story until then leaves ample room to speculate as to where a series would go with Helios' creations roaming the Earth."
