= Anthony Roll =

Record of ships of the English Tudor navy of the 1540s

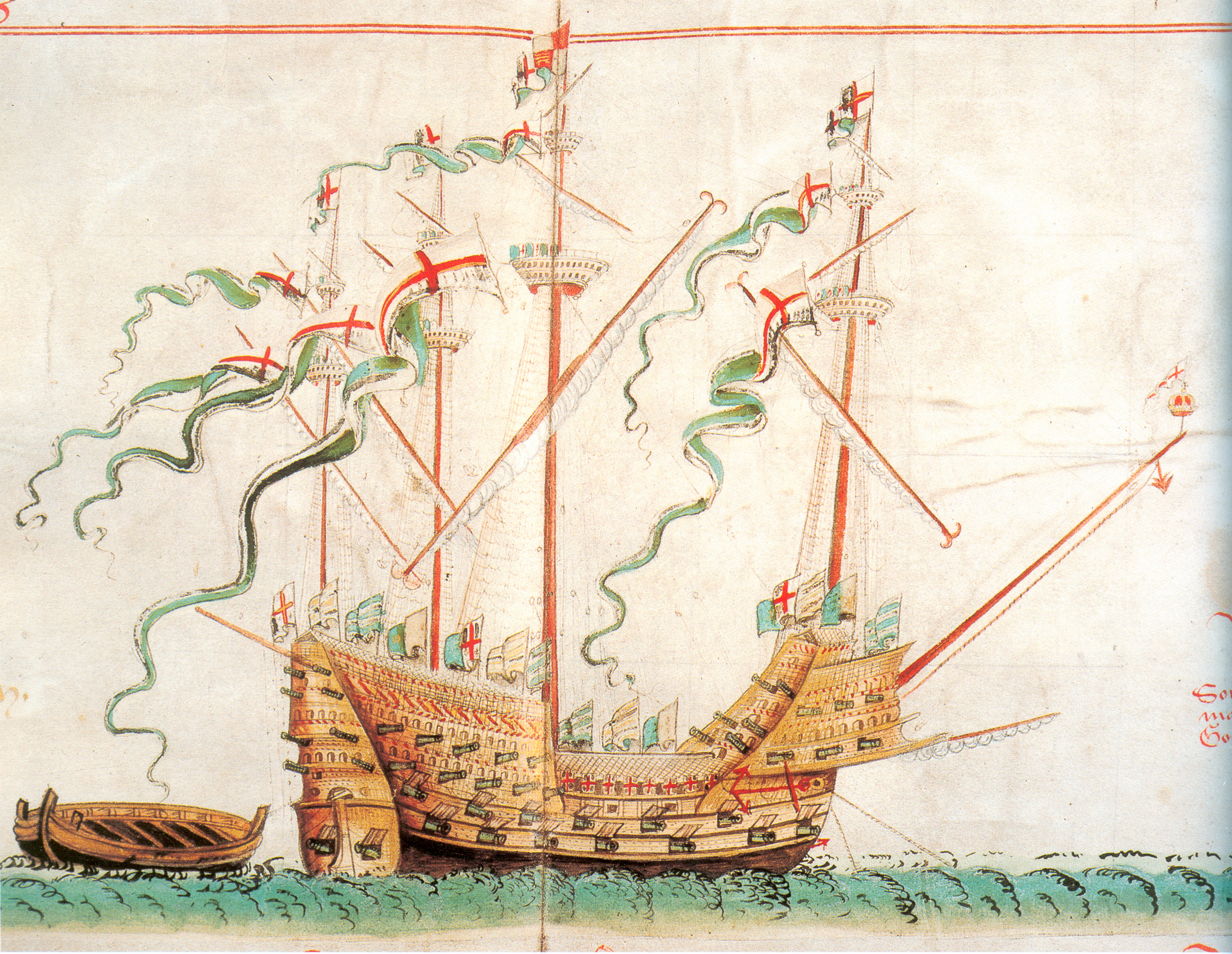
The first illustration of the first roll of the Anthony Roll, depicting the Henry Grace à Dieu, the largest ship in the English navy during the reign of King Henry VIII.

The Anthony Roll is a written record of ships of the English Tudor navy of the 1540s, named after its creator, Anthony Anthony. It originally consisted of three rolls of vellum, depicting 58 naval vessels along with information on their size, crew, armament, and basic equipment. The rolls were presented to King Henry VIII in 1546, and were kept in the royal library. In 1680 King Charles II gave two of the rolls to Samuel Pepys, who had them cut up and bound as a single volume book, which is now in the Pepys Library at Magdalene College, Cambridge. The third roll remained in the royal collection until it was given by King William IV to his daughter Lady Mary Fox, who sold it to the British Museum in 1858; it is now owned by the British Library.

The Anthony Roll is the only known fully illustrated inventory of ships of the English navy in the Tudor period. As the work of a successful state official in 16th-century England, the artistic value of the Anthony Roll has been described as being characterised by "naive draughtsmanship and conformity to a pattern" though its artistic aspects display "a decent amateur grasp of form and colour". While the inventories listed in its text have proven to be highly accurate, most of the ship illustrations are rudimentary and made according to a set formula. The level of detail of the ship design, armament and especially rigging has therefore proven to be only approximate. Nevertheless, through their depiction of the ceremonial ornamentation the illustrations in the Roll have provided relevant secondary information to the study of Tudor period heraldry, flags and ship ornamentation.

The only known contemporary depictions of prominent Tudor era vessels like the Henry Grace à Dieu and the Mary Rose are contained in the Anthony Roll. As the Mary Rose sank by accident in 1545 and was successfully salvaged in 1982, comparison between the information in the Roll and the physical evidence of the Mary Rose has provided new insights into the study of the naval history of the period.

== Author and artist ==
Anthony Anthony (before 1530 – c. 1564) has been identified as the compiler of the information and the artist behind the illustrations through his signature, which has been compared with holograph letters among the State Papers. Anthony's father was William Anthony (died 1535) a Fleming from Middelburg in Zeeland who migrated to England in 1503. William was a supplier of beer to the army, and Anthony followed in his father's footsteps. He went into beer exporting no later than 1530 and became a supplier of beer to the navy. In 1533 Anthony was appointed gunner at the Tower of London, a position he retained nominally until his death. He rose to the rank of overseer of the Ordnance Office, the government body responsible for supplying the armed forces with artillery, and it was in this position that he compiled his Roll. In 1549 he was promoted to master surveyor of the ordnance in the Tower, Calais, Boulogne, and elsewhere for life. He continued the work of supplying arms to English forces, and was active in the last month of his life supplying guns for an expedition against Le Havre.

In 1939 Dutch historian Nicholas Beets proposed that the Flemish artist and cartographer Cornelis Antoniszoon (or Antonisz., c. 1507–1553) could have been Anthony Anthony's brother. Although Beets' suggestion of kinship was conjectural and without any direct evidence, it was picked up by Geoffrey Callender in the Mariner's Mirror in 1963 and has been relayed by several other authors. The will of William Anthony did not mention any other sons and Anthonisz. is believed to have been the son of Antonis Egbertson, the daughter of Jacob Corneliszoon van Oostzanen. That Cornelis and Anthony were related is, in the words of Ann Payne, "not, presumably, impossible, but there is little evidence that they were connected at all".

== History of the manuscript ==
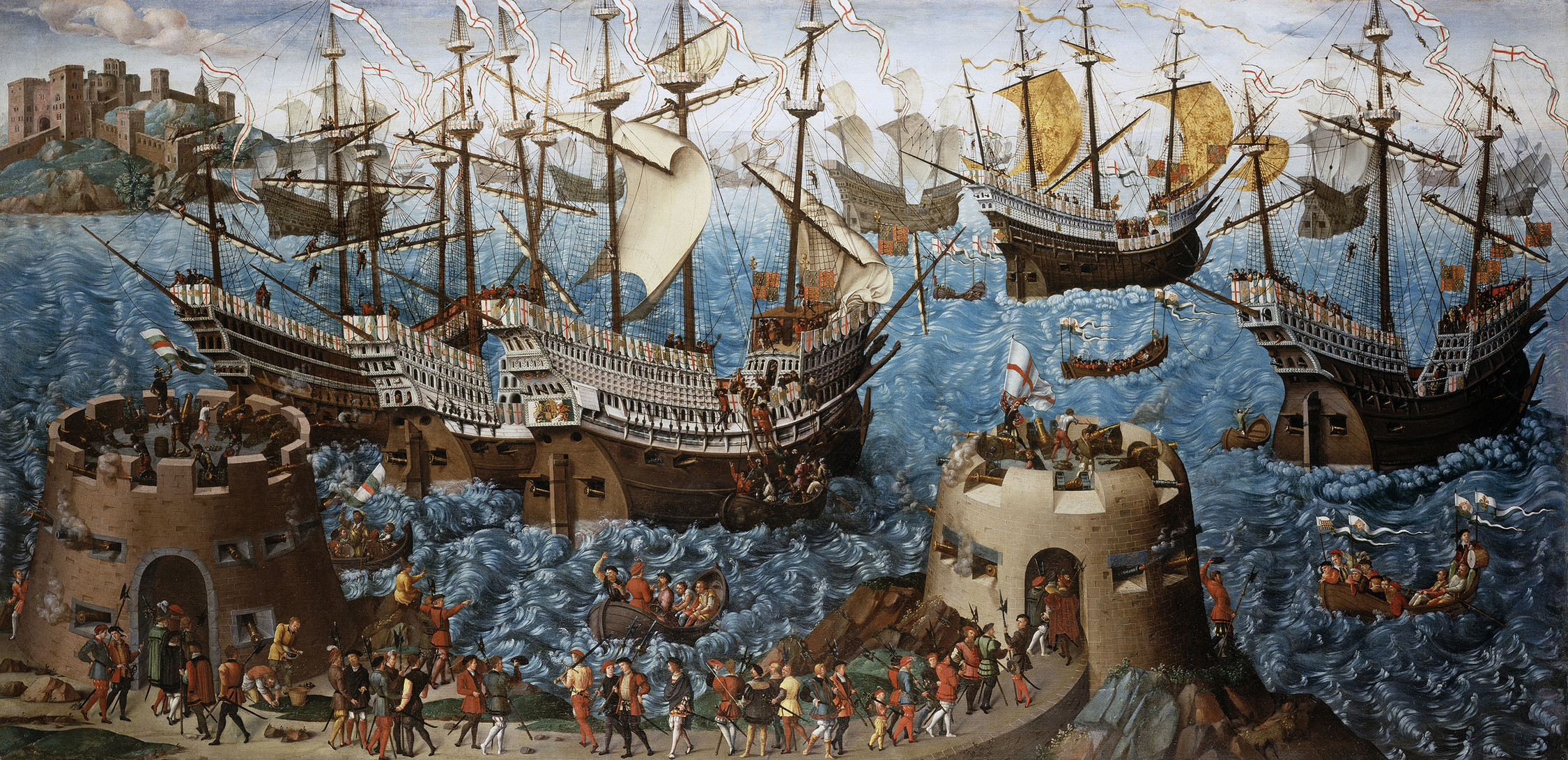
The Embarkation of Henry VIII at Dover, a contemporary painting that, just like the Anthony Roll, was intended to serve as a showpiece of Tudor royal authority and military might.

The "ship portrait" had a long history in maritime art, from medieval seals and coins to early engravings in the 15th century, and the plain side-on view of a ship under sail, often with no crew shown, was well established as the most effective way of recording the build of vessels. The Anthony Roll belongs to a genre of works that was intended to serve a dual role for the king and the military leadership: as reasonably informative overviews listing details of ships or strategic areas of coastlines they could be studied to determine strengths and weaknesses, and as boastful and lively depictions of Tudor military might they could be used to flatter the king, impress courtiers and impose martial authority on foreign ambassadors. Contemporary maps, or "plats", were routinely decorated with detailed pictures of ships, to mark bodies of water as much as to liven up the scenes. Such maps were common at the time, and were even embellished by artists if deemed too simple or drab. The navy was expanded during Henry VIII's reign, and he was known to take an interest in warships, as can be seen by the epic painting Embarkation of Henry VIII at Dover which portrayed, if rather unrealistically, the ships that took the 29-year-old king to the summit meeting with Francis I of France at the Field of the Cloth of Gold in 1520. This painting, recently dated to around 1545, has also been suggested as a likely source of inspiration to Anthony for his illustrations.

There are three such plats depicting naval actions and expeditions that are attributed to Anthony: the route of Anne of Cleves from the Low Countries to England (1539), a French attack on a coastal fort (date unknown) and a French raid on Brighton (July 1545). The design of the ships in these paintings, especially that of the Brighton raid, closely match those in the rolls. It is not known exactly when work on the rolls began nor when it was finished. It is only certain that it was presented to the king the year it was dated, 1546. The inclusion of the Mary Rose that sank at the Battle of the Solent 19 July 1545 does not mean it was necessarily started before this date, since it was still considered possible that she could be raised even as late as 1549. The galleasses, the Antelope, Hart, Bull and Tiger, all present in the second roll, were still being built around March 1546, and the Hart was not at sea until October that year. At the same time the Galley Blanchard, captured from the French 18 May 1546 is not included.

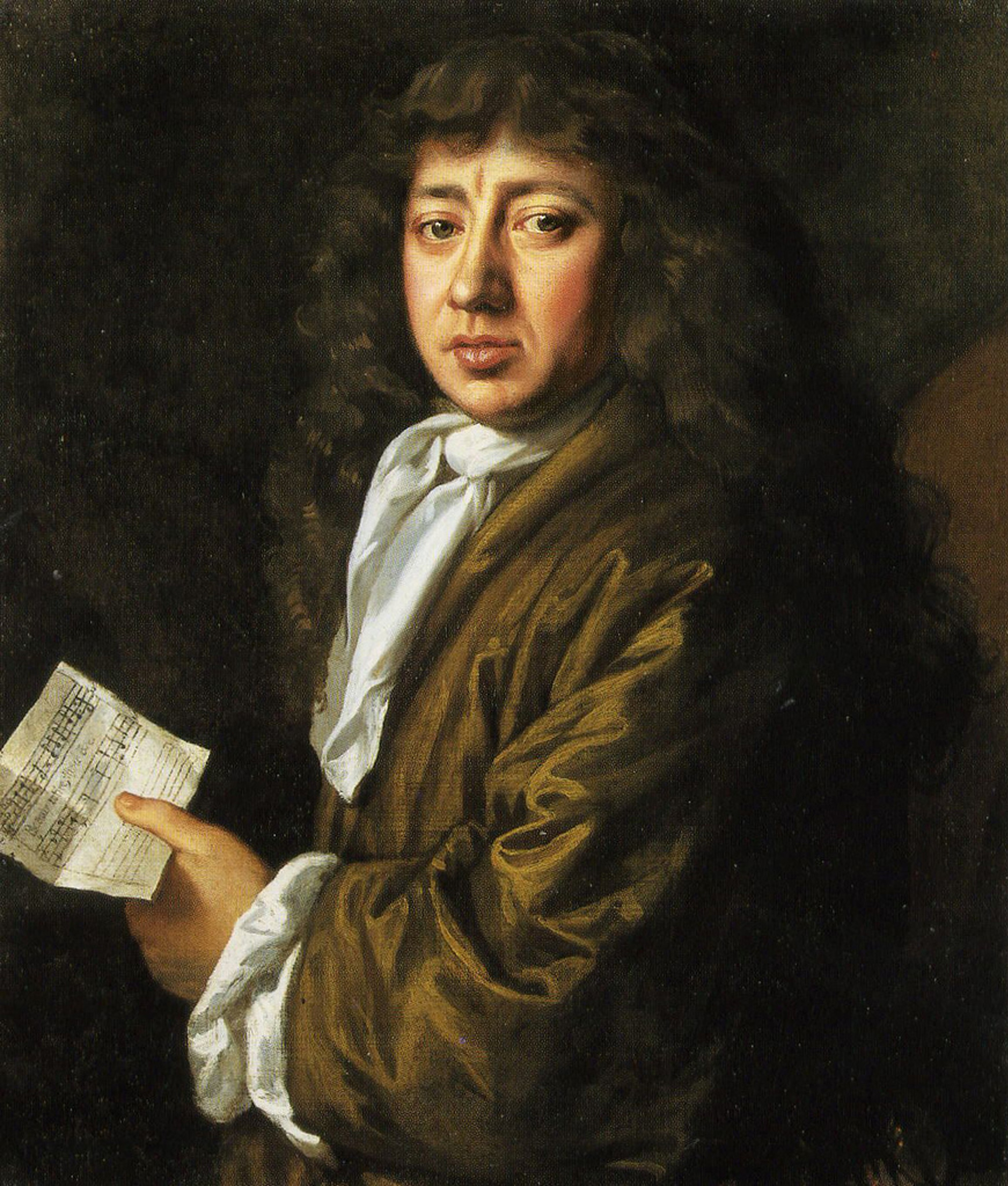
Samuel Pepys, who owned two of the rolls and had them cut up and bound in a single volume.

After the rolls were presented to the king they were archived in the royal collections. In 1680 Charles II gave two of the rolls to Samuel Pepys, a navy administrator and avid book collector. Pepys did not disclose the details of how the rolls were given to him, but it is believed that the gift came out of a meeting with King Charles where Pepys took down the king's account of how he escaped from the Battle of Worcester (1651). The plan was that Pepys would edit and publish the already famous story, but he never did so. It is also known that Pepys was planning to write a history of the navy and that he was gathering material for this task, but this project also was never finished. It is considered likely that King Charles was aware of Pepys' plans and presented him with two of the rolls either as a gift or as payment for the intended publication of the escape story. The second roll could not be located at that time, and it was not until 1690 that it was discovered by Henry Thynne, keeper of the royal library 1677–89 and a close friend of Pepys. Thynne arranged for Pepys to make copies of some of the illustrations, but by 1690 Charles was dead and James II was in exile. Pepys had resigned from his position as Secretary of the Admiralty that same year and refused to recognize the reign of William III and Mary II, which meant that acquisition of the final roll for his collection was out of the question. The creation of the codex from the first and third rolls is therefore assumed to have been completed shortly after that time. After Pepys' death in 1703 his library passed on to his nephew John Jackson. After the death of Jackson in 1724 the library, along with the codex, was then passed on to Pepys' old college at Magdalene, Cambridge, where it remains to this day.

The second roll was presumed lost by the 1780s, but actually remained in the hands of the royal family. William IV gave it to his illegitimate daughter Mary FitzClarance sometime in the early 19th century. In 1824, FitzClarance married Charles Robert Fox, a major-general and from 1832 to 1835 an officer of the surveyor of the ordnance, the same position Anthony Anthony had three centuries before him. Fox was a bibliophile, and historian Charles Knighton has suggested he knew the value of the roll, but its location nevertheless remained unknown to scholars. In 1857 Frederic Madden, keeper of manuscripts at the British Museum, was shown the second roll and learned that Mary Fox wished to sell it. After negotiations it was sold for £15 to the British Museum and was numbered Add MS 22047. It was kept in its original format as a roll and has been stored in the British Library's manuscript collection at St Pancras since 1999.

The Anthony Roll has been used frequently as a primary source for histories of the English navy of the 16th century, but the full text and all illustrations were not collected in one volume until 2000.

== Description ==
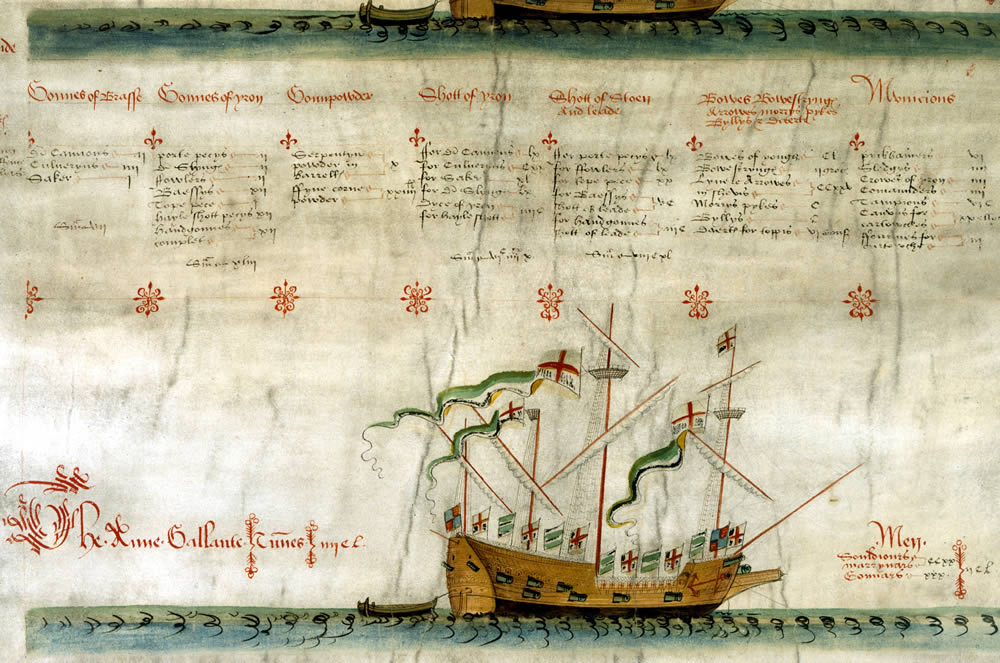
A view of the second roll of the Anthony Roll, showing the layout used throughout the document. The information for each vessel is displayed in columns directly below its illustration, here with the text for the Grand Mistress (seen only partially above the text) and a full view of the illustration of the galleass Anne Gallant.

The Anthony Roll was originally a set of three separate vellum rolls. It exists today in the form of a bound volume containing the first and third rolls while the second roll is preserved in its original form. The three original rolls were made up out of a total of 17 individual membranes glued to the back of the next membrane. The membranes were of a width of 27 1/2 inches (70 cm) and a height varying from 31 to 37 3/4 inches (79 to 96 cm). After receiving the first and third rolls Pepys had his clerks cut the rolls up and bound in a single volume as a book, now known as Pepys 2991. The transformation of the two rolls created a horizontal page structure, and some of the ornamentation that was cut in process was copied into the volume by hand. Pepys also inserted abstracts between the two rolls and a summarizing table that was not Anthony's, but pre-dated Pepys' binding of the rolls. This radical treatment of the original document has damaged some of the illustrations and is today deprecated. The first three illustrations of the Henry Grace à Dieu, Mary Rose and Peter Pomegranate were all too large to fit on one page and were therefore converted to two-page spreads. The resulting bend down the centre of the illustrations led to noticeable loss of detail. Despite this, there are no plans to attempt a recreation of the original structure of the first and third rolls. The second roll, British Library Add MS 22047, is still in its original condition with the exception of a written endorsement by Mary Fox from 1857 and some damage caused by an application of chemicals to reveal faded writing.

The three rolls list 58 ships divided into classes based roughly on size and construction. Each ship is presented along with its name, tonnage, (Note: This is a rather rough estimate of burthen, the carrying capacity of a ship, and should not be confused with the much more modern measurement of displacement, which would be considerably higher than the figures in the roll. For a detailed discussion of the meaning of tonnage and burthen in early modern naval terminology, Rodger 1997, pp. xx–xxii) crew size and, in Anthony's own words, "the ordenaunce, artillery, munitions and habillimentes for warre". The first roll lists the carracks and one pinnace, beginning with the largest ship Henry Grace à Dieu. The second roll lists galleasses, a hybrid of oar-powered and sailing vessels, and one galley. Finally, the third roll is reserved for pinnaces and "rowbarges", both basically smaller versions of galleasses. (Note: See Bennel 2000, p. 35 for a detailed discussion of the definition of the various oar-powered vessels.)

== Artistic analysis ==
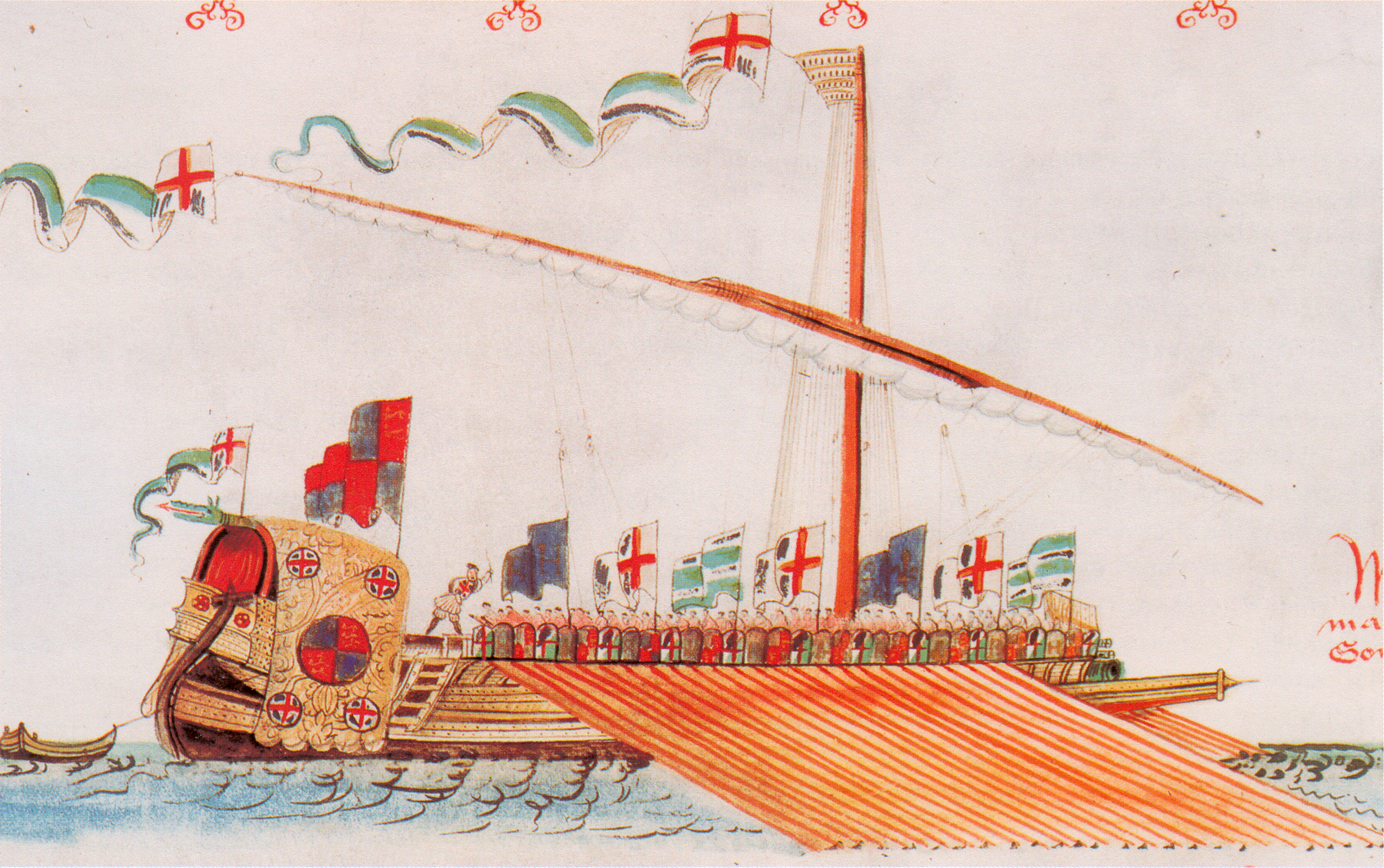
The Galley Subtle, a Mediterranean-type galley which formed the centrepiece of the three combined rolls and the illustration that displays the highest artistic quality.

Anthony Anthony was not a trained, professional artist. The illustrations are described as "striking and boldly executed, but [...] have few claims to be fine works of art". The vessels are for the most part painted according to a standard formula, with distinct repetitions even in the more elaborate depictions. Anthony's style is signified by a "naive draughtsmanship and conformity to a pattern [...] consistent with the abilities of a government official with a decent amateur grasp of form and colour".

The rolls were all of roughly the same length, about 15 feet (4.6 m), and would most likely have been presented side by side for display on a table or hung on a wall. The focal point of the whole composition is in the second, middle roll where the exceptionally well-executed painting of the Galley Subtle is placed. That this ship was intended to be the centrepiece illustration is made clear by the presence of the pinnace Mary James in the first roll, which is otherwise reserved for (sailing) ships. This appears to have originally been placed at the beginning of the third roll, among the other pinnaces and rowbarges, but was moved to achieve more equal lengths. In his pursuit of living up to the image of a Renaissance prince Henry is known to have been particularly fond of galleys, something which would have been known to Anthony.

The lettering, framing lines and floral pattern decorations are painted in red or black with the exception of the first three ships of the first roll, which also feature gold. Most of the illustrations were first sketched with plummet outlines and were then painted over in washes. Ship timbers are a light brown that are shaded in the bow and stern to achieve depth, decorations and anchors are highlighted with red, and green is used for guns. Contours are in black and the sea is in shades varying from "greyish green" to "a richer blue".

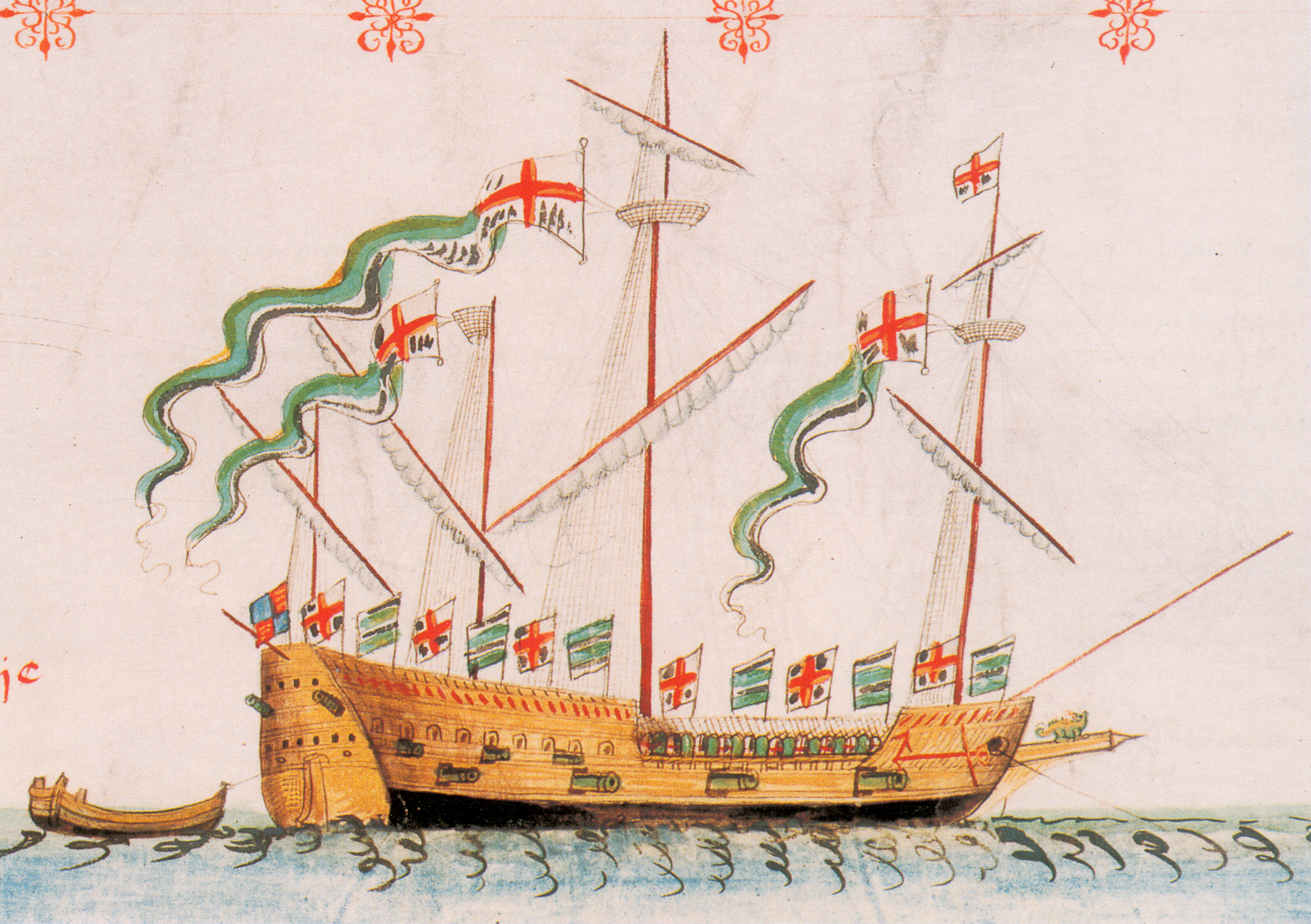
The Salamander, a galleass captured from the Scots and one of only three ships in the Anthony Roll which has an identifiable figurehead.

The first two rolls were done with roughly the same amount of detail while the lesser rowbarges (essentially small galleys) were done more hastily. The first two ships of the first roll, the Henry Grace à Dieu and the Mary Rose, have traces of a grid pattern, indicating that they were transferred from a different drawing while the rest are done in freehand. Overall, the ships follow a formula depending on the type of ship. The exceptions are stern galleries of some of the galleasses and the figureheads of the Mary Rose, Salamander and the Unicorn, the latter both captured from the Scots in 1544. The prominent exception is the Galley Subtle placed in the middle of the second roll. It is more consistent in type with Mediterranean-type galleys than the galleasses and small rowbarges, and features a considerable amount of detail not present in the other ships. It is the only ship where any crew is visible, in this case rowers behind pavisades as protection from enemy arrows and an overseer wearing "a bonnet, full skirted armorial doublet and baggy breeches" holding a stick or baton, as if beating the time of the strokes of the rowers.

== Use as a historical source ==
As a historical record, the Anthony Roll is in many ways unique. It is the only known fully illustrated list of a Tudor period royal navy, though the pictures should not be seen as exact depictions drawn from real life. For example, the lists of guns of the individual ships, which are considered to be an accurate record produced by a senior state official, are only approximately matched to the paintings. The rigging is only roughly accurate, and has been described by Margaret Rule, archaeological project leader of the Mary Rose excavations, as "a confusing assemblage of shrouds, ratlines and stays". Many details are present, but others are missing, such as the chain-wales (the horizontal platforms extending from the sides) to which the shrouds (the parallel ropes that stabilized the masts) were attached to keep them clear of the hull.

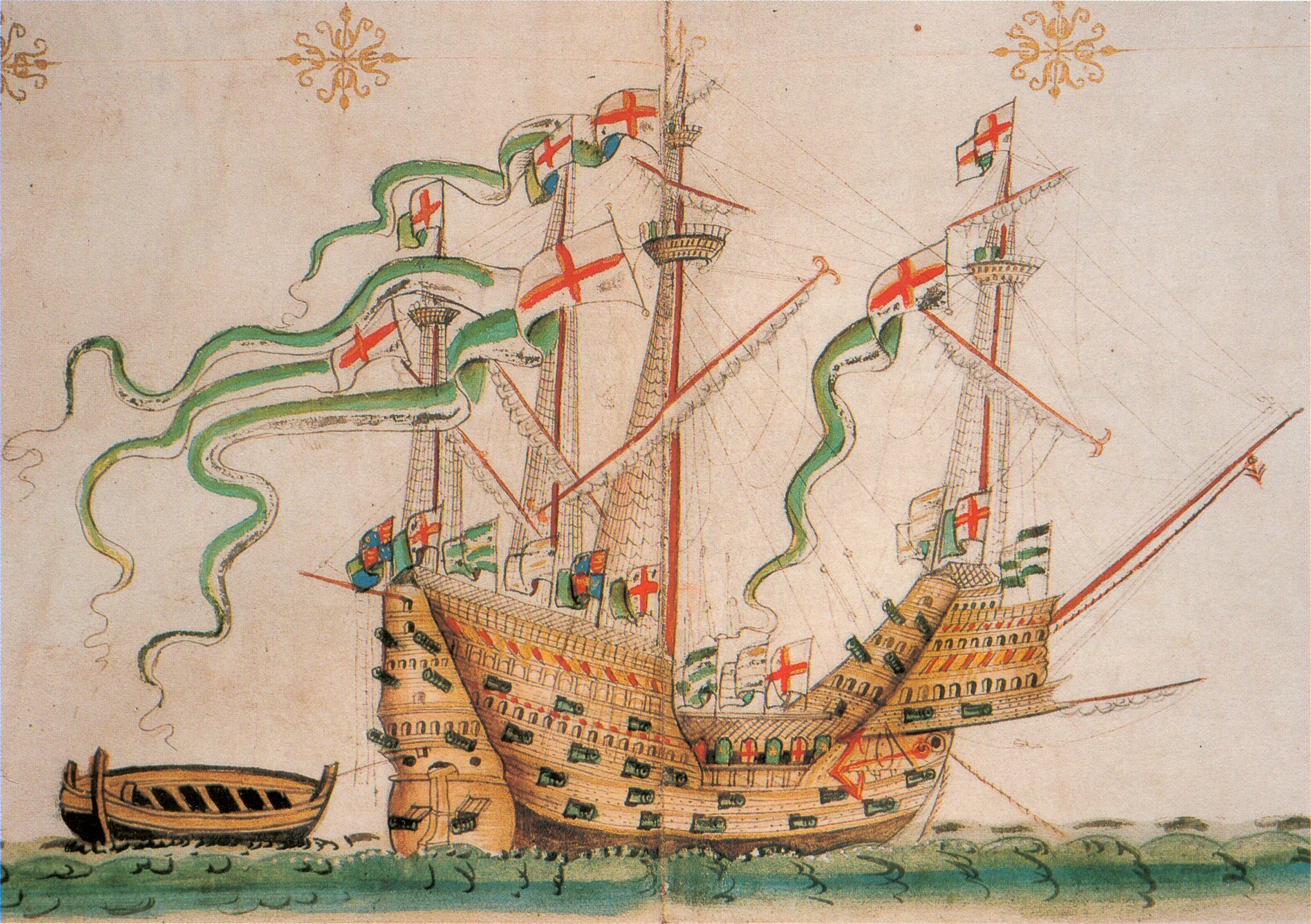
Peter Pomegranate sister ship of the "Mary Rose"

=== Comparisons with the Mary Rose ===
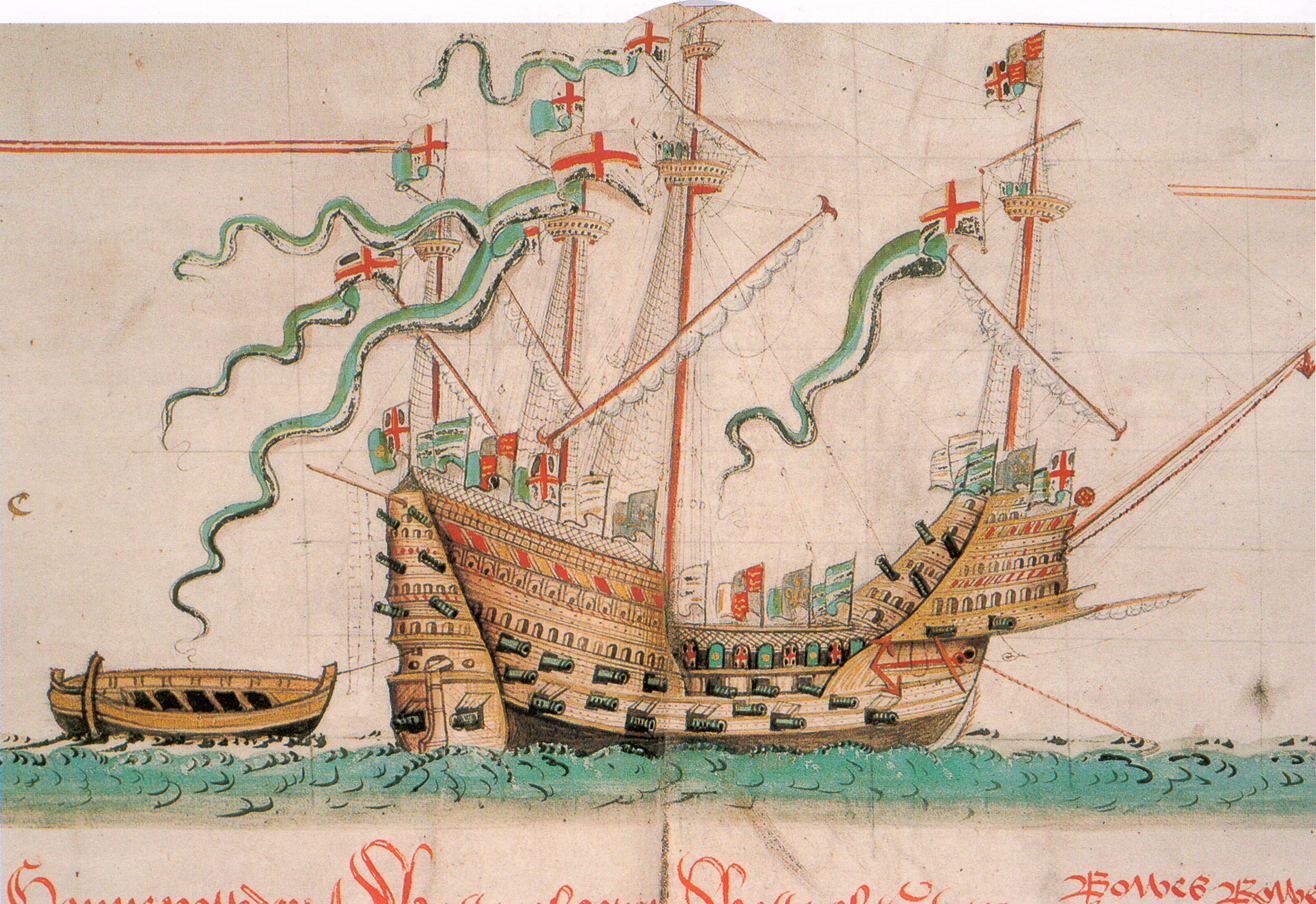
The illustration of the Mary Rose, which has been compared to the salvaged wreck of the actual ship to determine the historical accuracy of Anthony Anthony's ship portrayals

Comparisons with the finds from the salvaged Mary Rose itself have provided an opportunity to compare the accuracy of the records provided in the Roll. The picture of the ship has provided clues about basic structural features, such as the number of masts and sails. When compared with an inventory of the ship from 1514, there is a close match, proving the illustration to be largely accurate. Examination of details in the construction, however, reveals that Anthony allowed himself some artistic licence. The armament in the painted ship appears clearly exaggerated. The heavy stern chasers (cannon placed in the stern aimed backwards) mounted through gun ports on the orlop deck, just about the waterline, would not have been feasible because of the lack of an orlop deck and the steep angle (sheer) of the ship in this area. The number of gunports in the broadside is inaccurate since it implies two slightly staggered rows of nine ports while the surviving starboard side of the Mary Rose has only one row of gunports on the main deck with seven ports. The accuracy of the forecastle has been more difficult to ascertain since none of it remains; conflicting interpretations of what it looked like have been suggested.

The guns in the back of the forecastle have defied explanation, but one theory is that they were included to compensate for the guns that were positioned in the aftcastle, aiming forwards, but which would have been obscured due to the angle from which the ship was depicted. The list of ammunition, small firearms, longbows, arrows, pikes, and bills closely matches the archaeological evidence. As the source that is closest in time to the sinking of the Mary Rose, it has been of central importance for the archaeological project, especially in estimating the size of the crew.

=== Flags and ornamentation ===
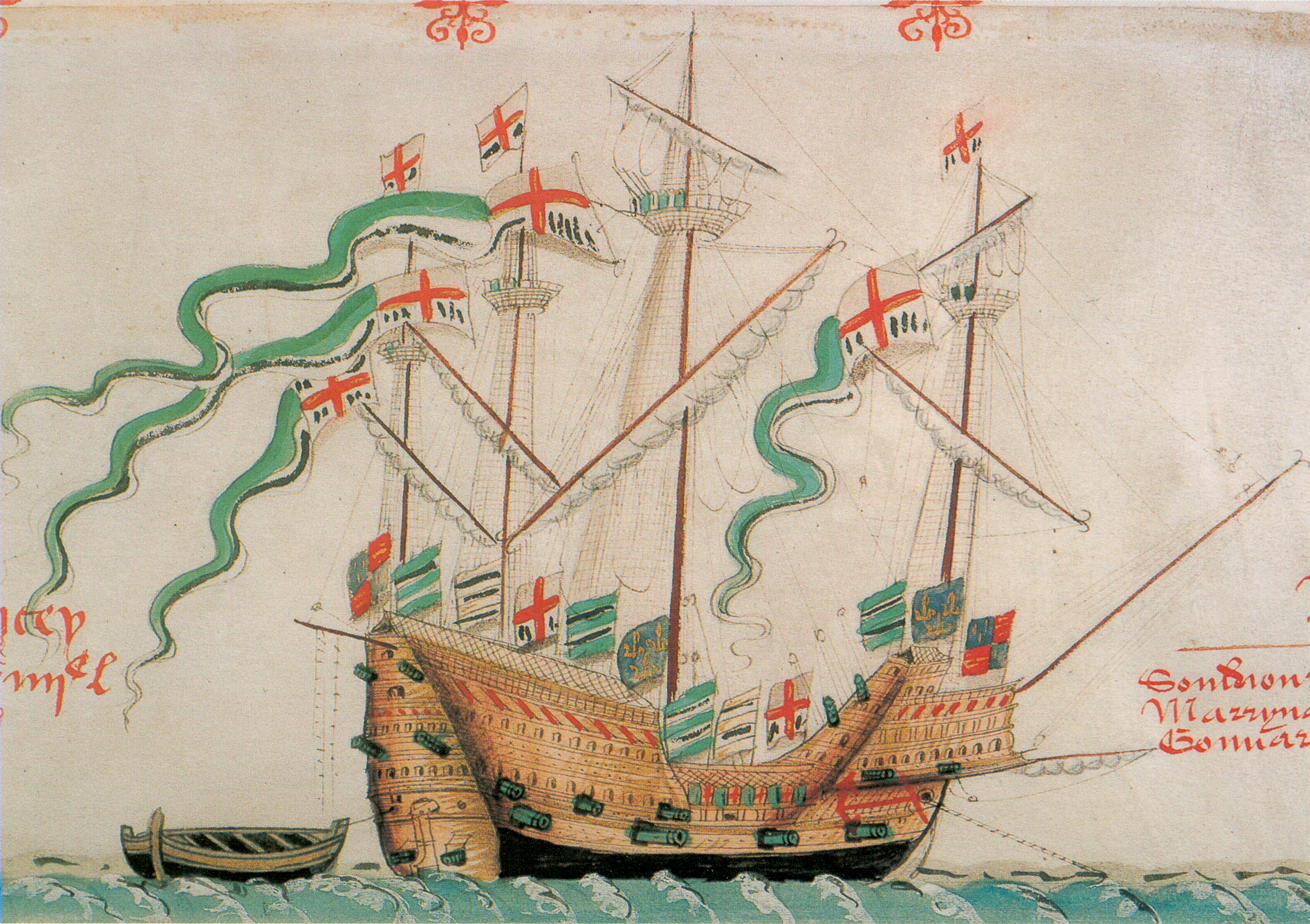
The carrack Pansy with various types of heraldic banners along its railings.

The Anthony Roll provides detailed information about the flags used on the ships. According to the vexillologist Timothy Wilson, the flags depicted flying from the ships are "the most elaborate source we have for the flags flown on the ships of King Henry VIII, being richer in visual detail than all other sources put together." Among the most striking flags in the illustrations are the elongated ceremonial streamers, shown flying from all ships in varying numbers. These feature a Saint George red cross on white ground on the hoist, nearest the flagpole, and a very long tail striped in green and white. They all feature gold paint on the red and green, and silver paint (now oxidized to black) on the white. This artistic device was used either to simulate the fluttering of the flags or to actually display the metallic thread and paint that was sometimes used to decorate them.

Along the railing of all ships, most prominently on the large carracks and the Galley Subtle, there are rows of banners displaying various heraldic designs, including the English royal arms, one or three fleur-de-lis of the French arms, Saint George's crosses and Henry VIII's monogram ("HR") in gold on blue, what appears to be the Tudor rose, and the green and white of the House of Tudor. The depictions of the flags and banners on the ships are in a heraldic and military sense considered to be roughly accurate but not entirely consistent. A kind of system of command among the various vessels is apparent in how flags are displayed on the masts, but it does not appear to have been carried through systematically. Some of the heraldic designs have been described as "unlikely" by the 20th century herald George Bellew, but have deemed to at least be "plausible" by Wilson.

== Gallery: The Anthony Roll of Henry VIII's Navy: 58 War Ships ==
- First roll – 20 Carracks (Pepys Library at Magdalene College, Cambridge.)
- Second roll – 15 Galleasses (Pepys Library at Magdalene College, Cambridge.)
- Third roll – 23 Pinnaces and rowbarges (British Library)

== The first roll: 20 great ships (English military carracks with forecastle and aftcastle) ==
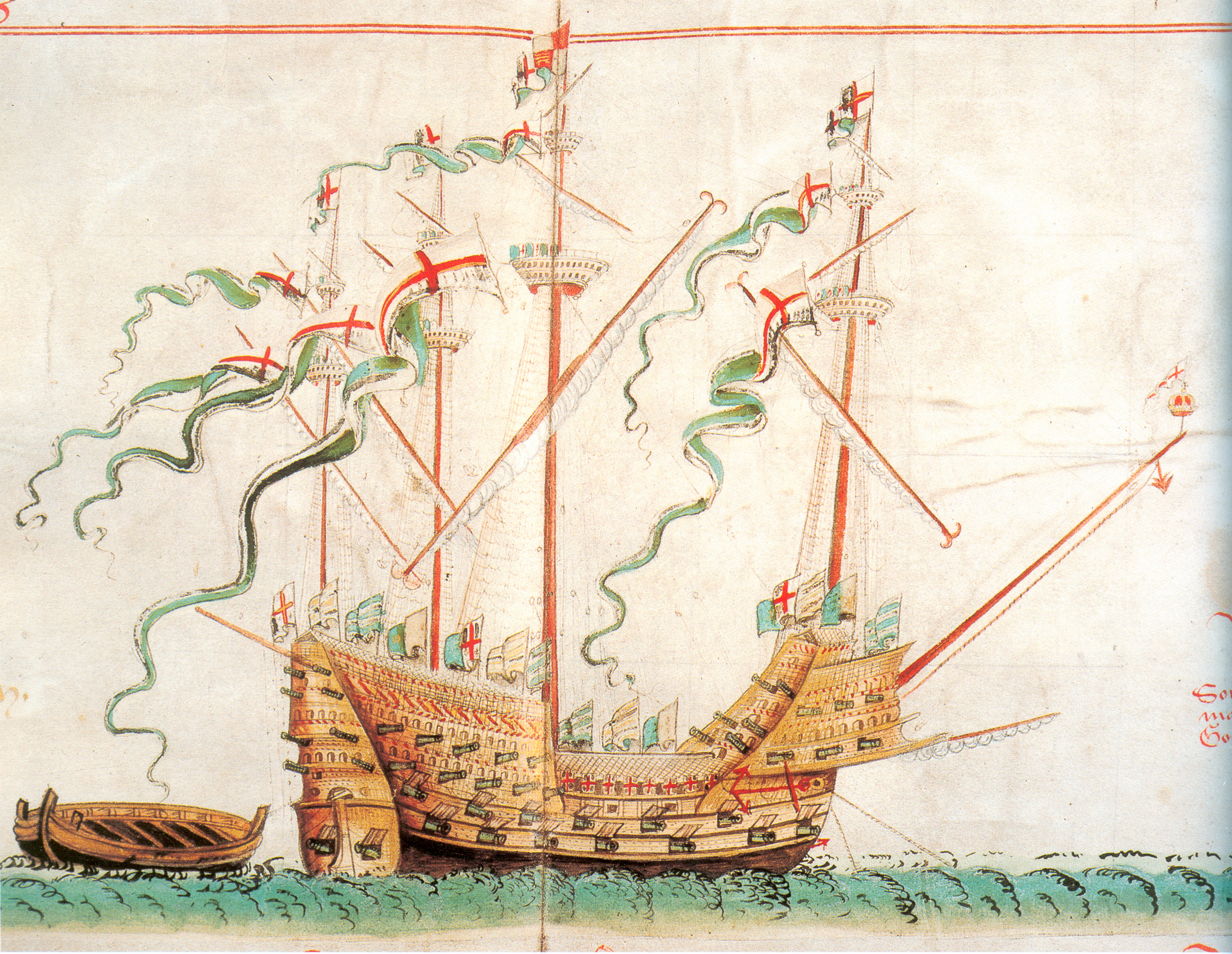
The carrack Henry Grace à Dieu AKA Great Harry

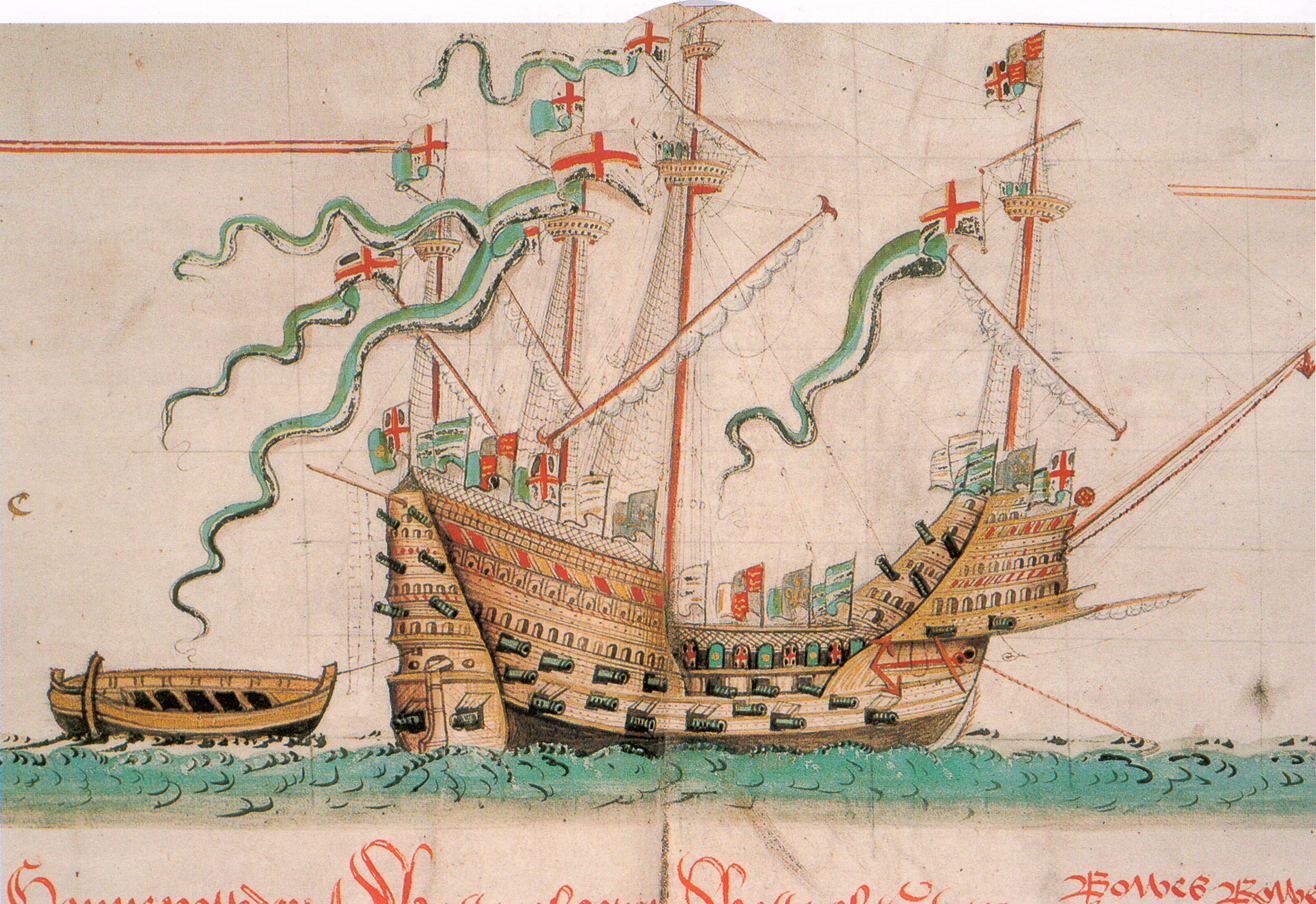
The carrack Mary Rose

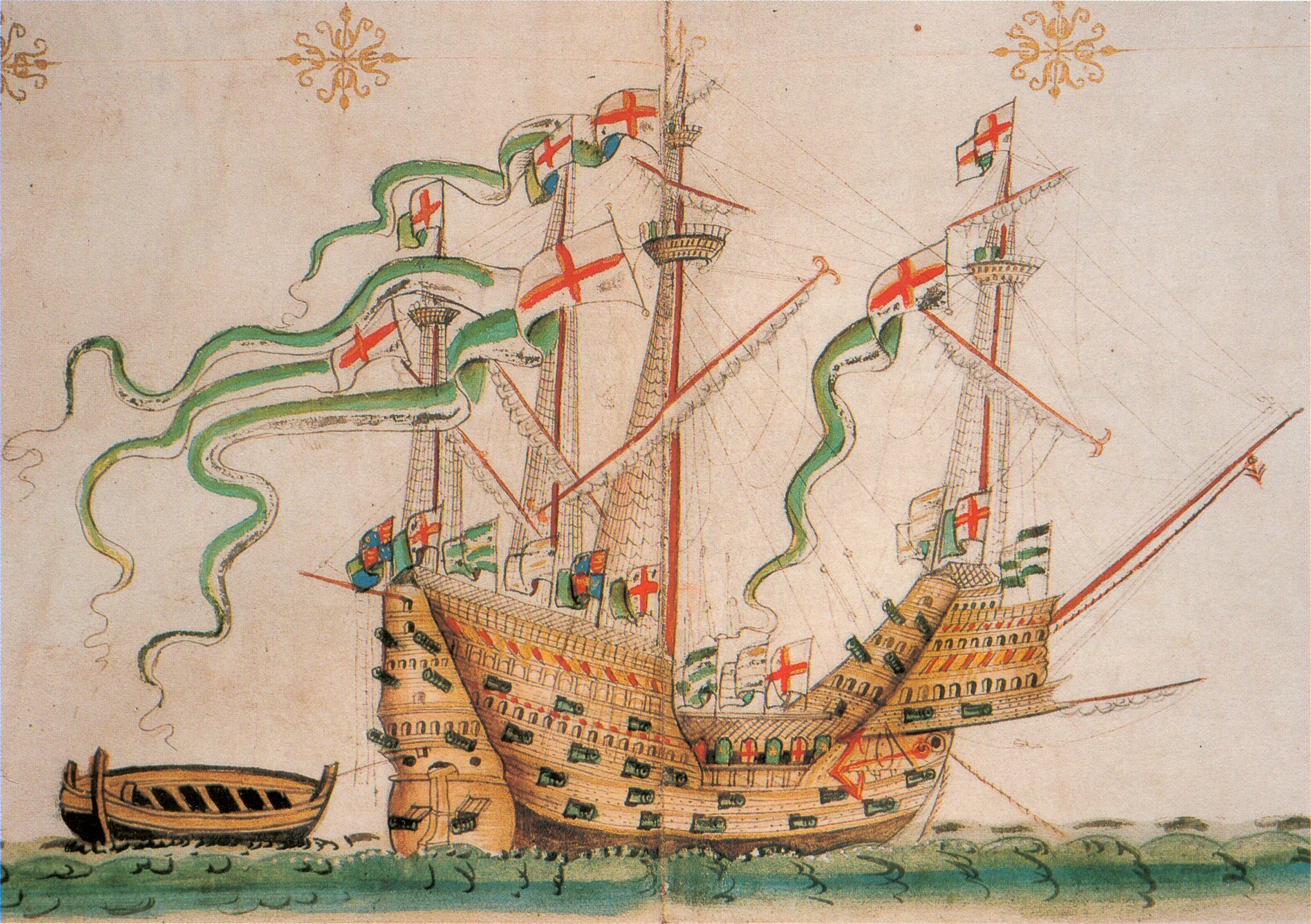
The carrack Peter Pomegranate (later Peter)

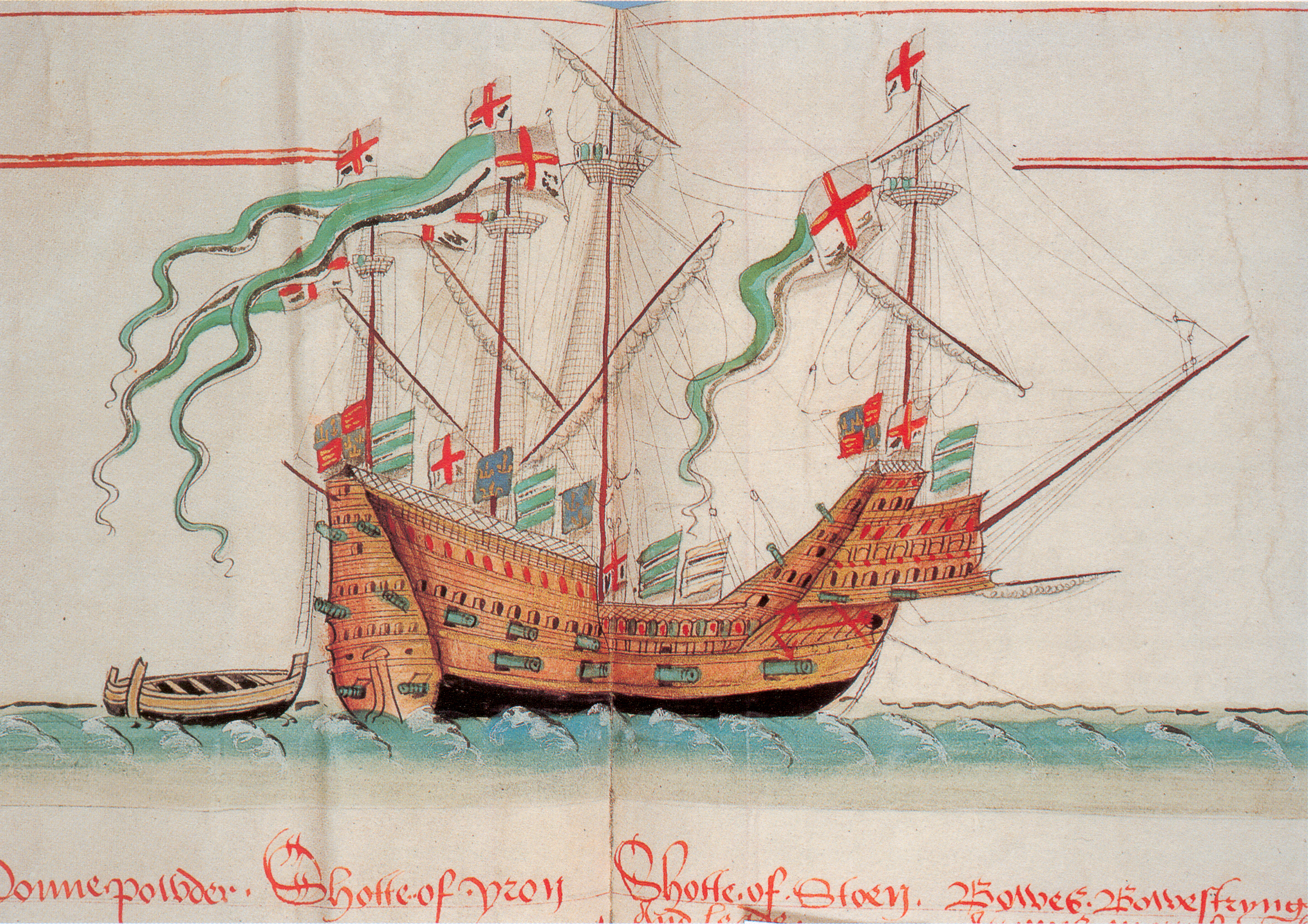
The carrack Matthew

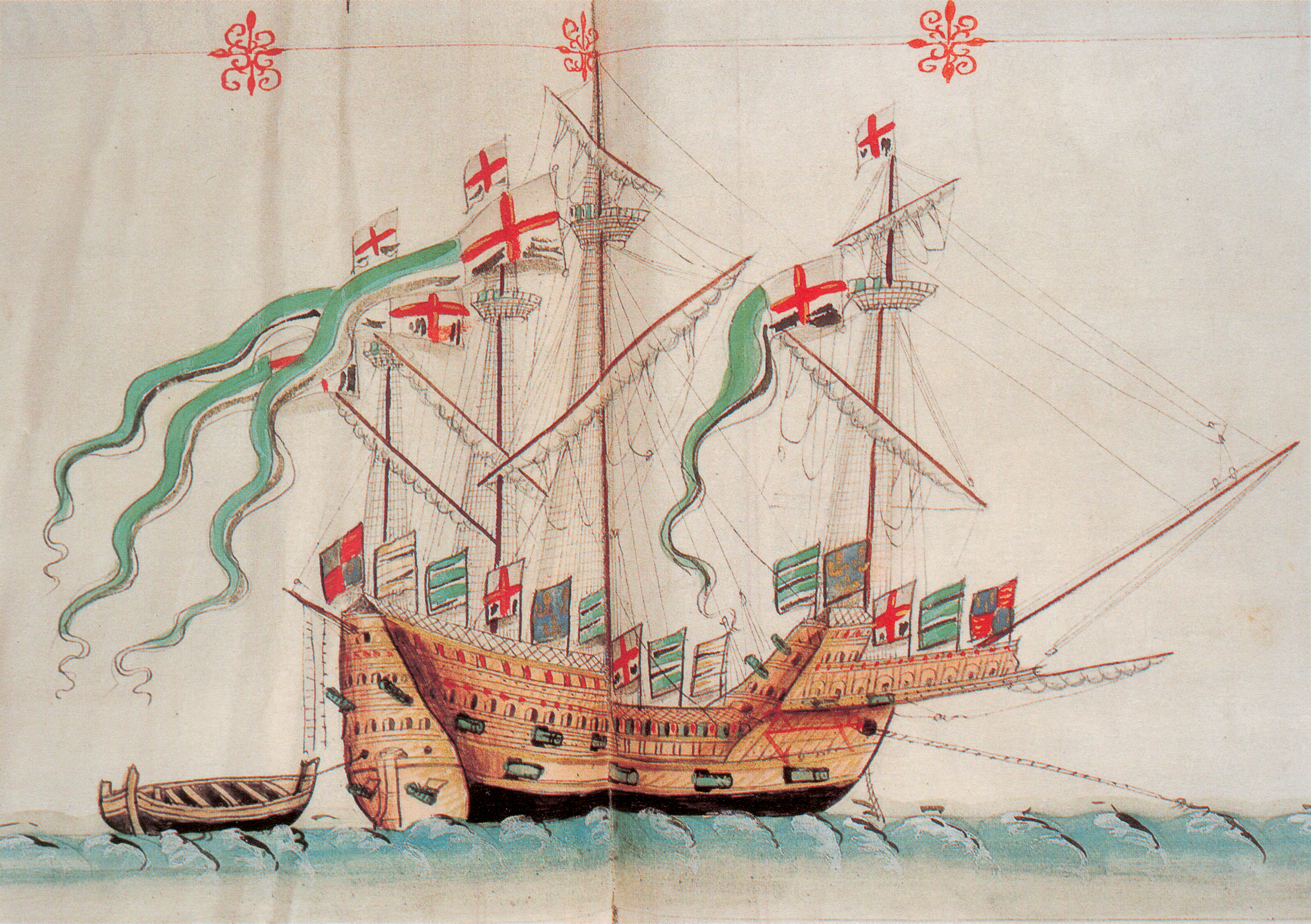
The carrack Great Bark

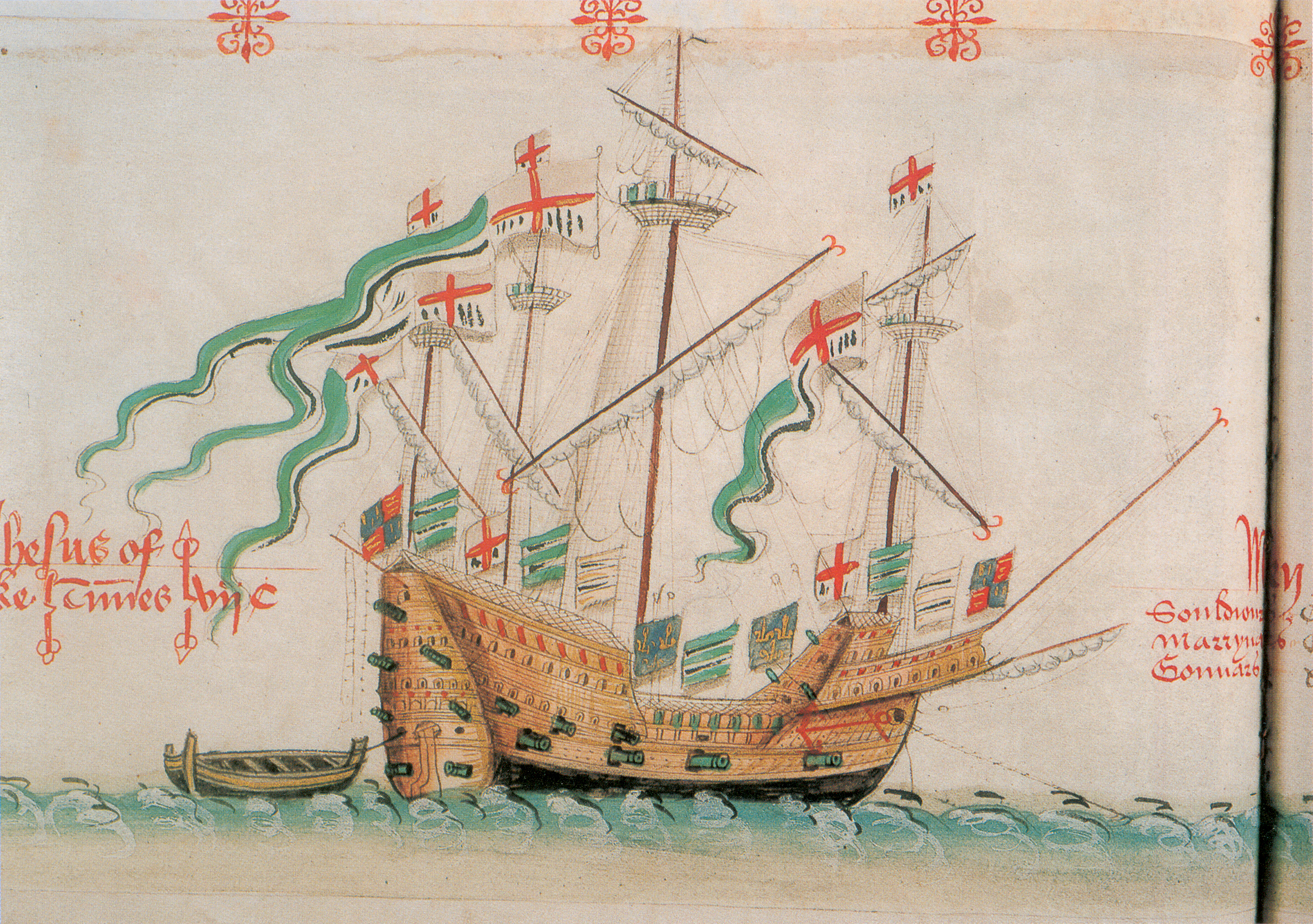
The carrack Jesus of Lübeck

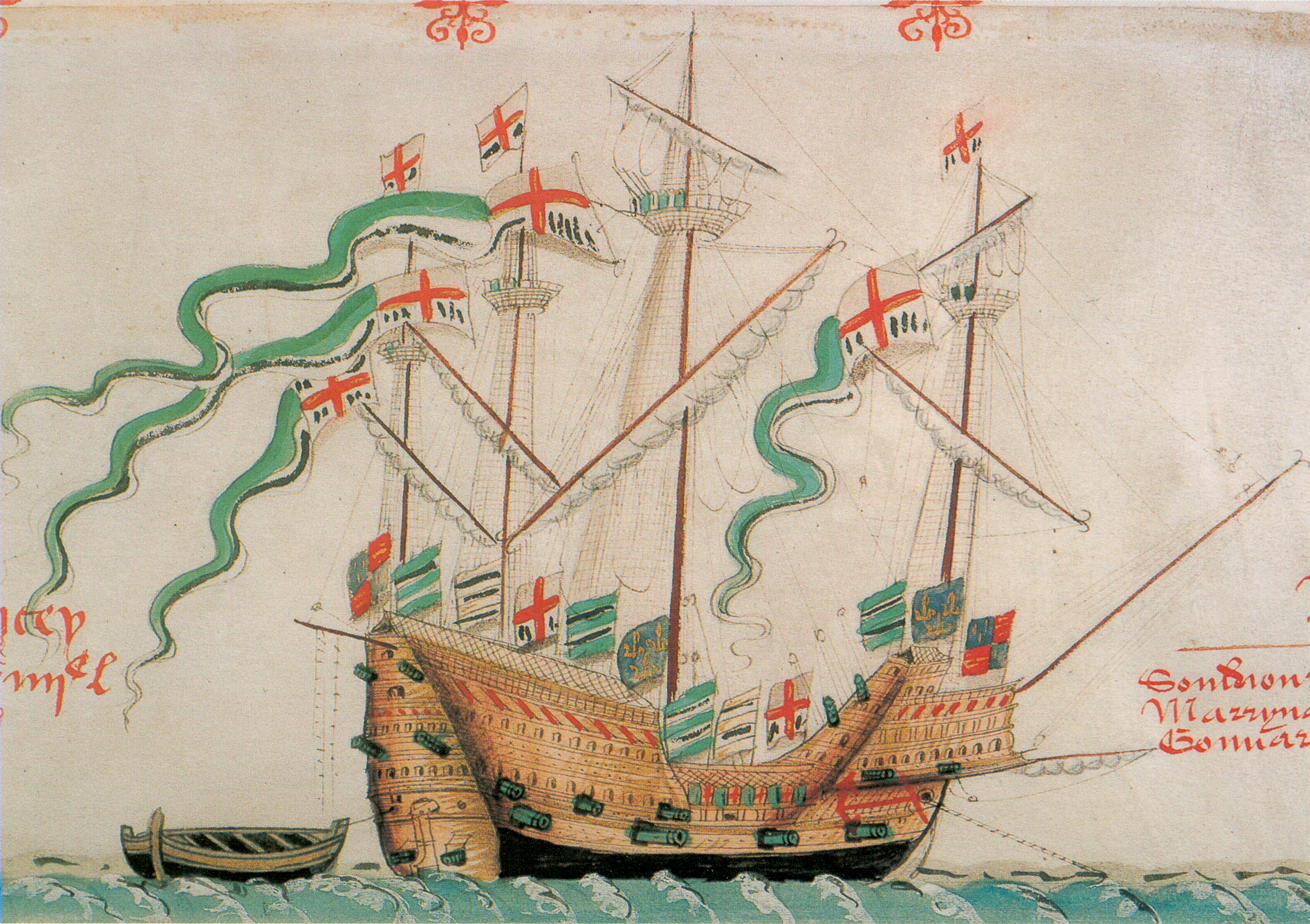
The carrack Pauncy

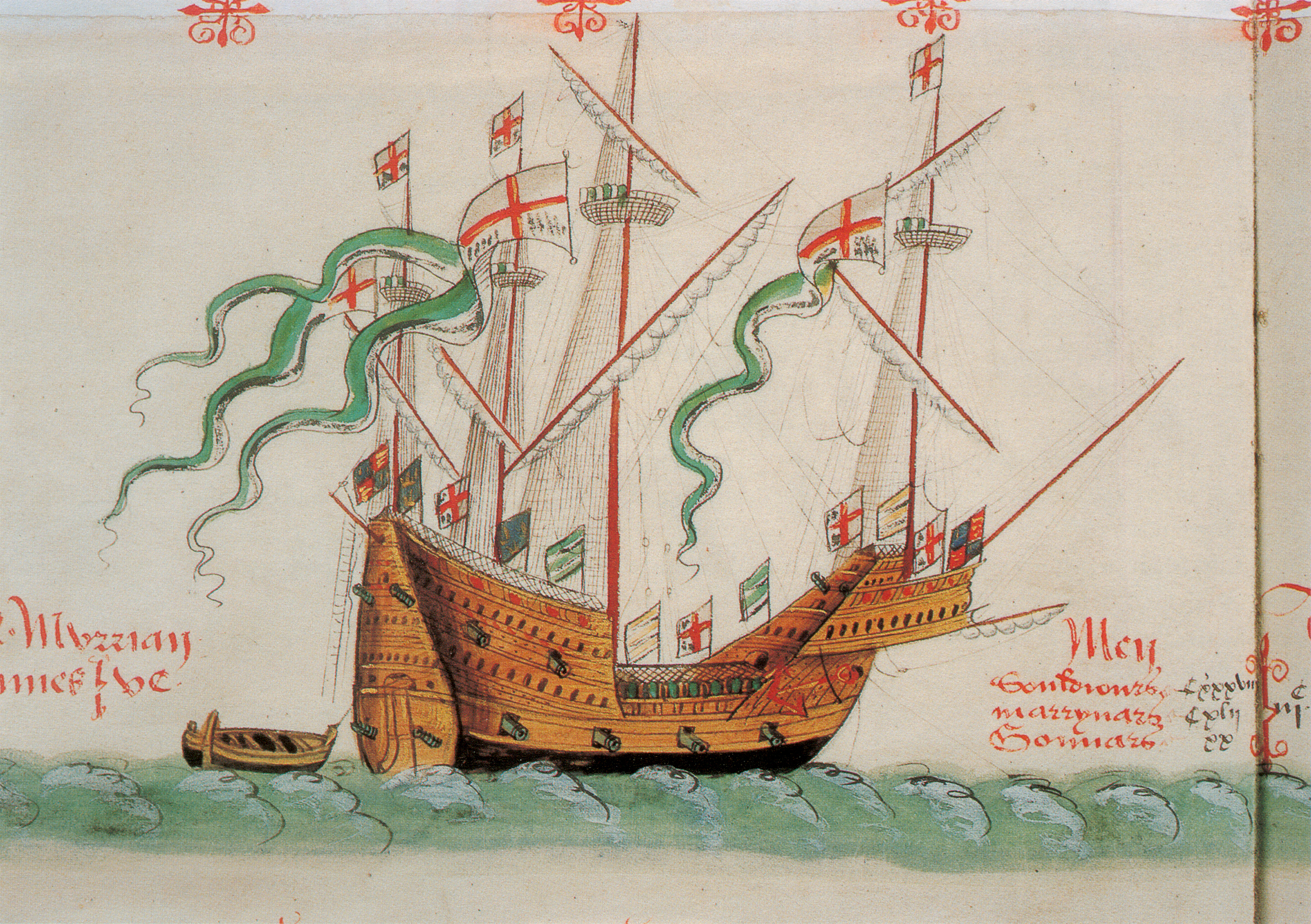
The carrack Morian

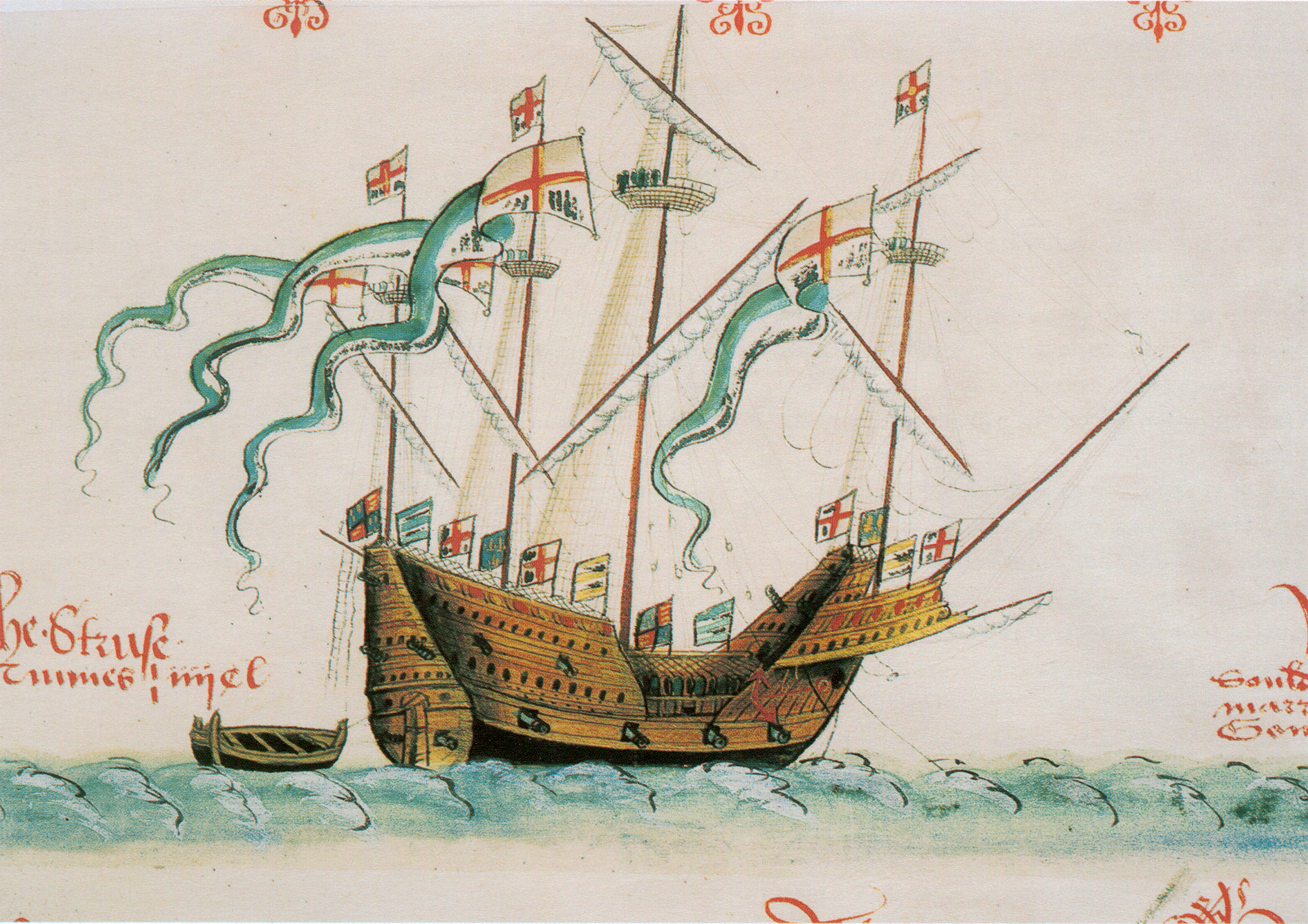
The carrack Struse

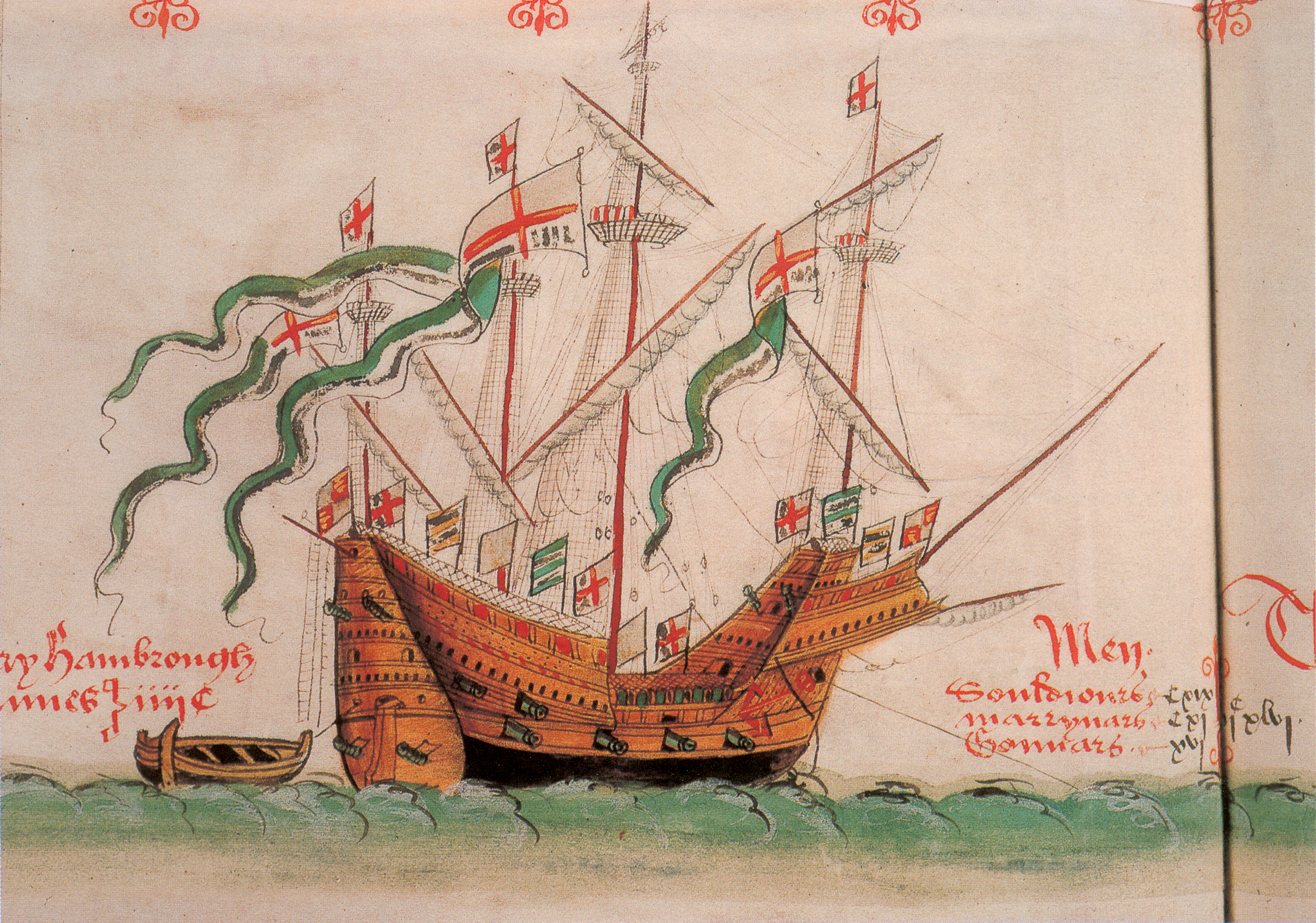
The carrack Mary of Hamburg

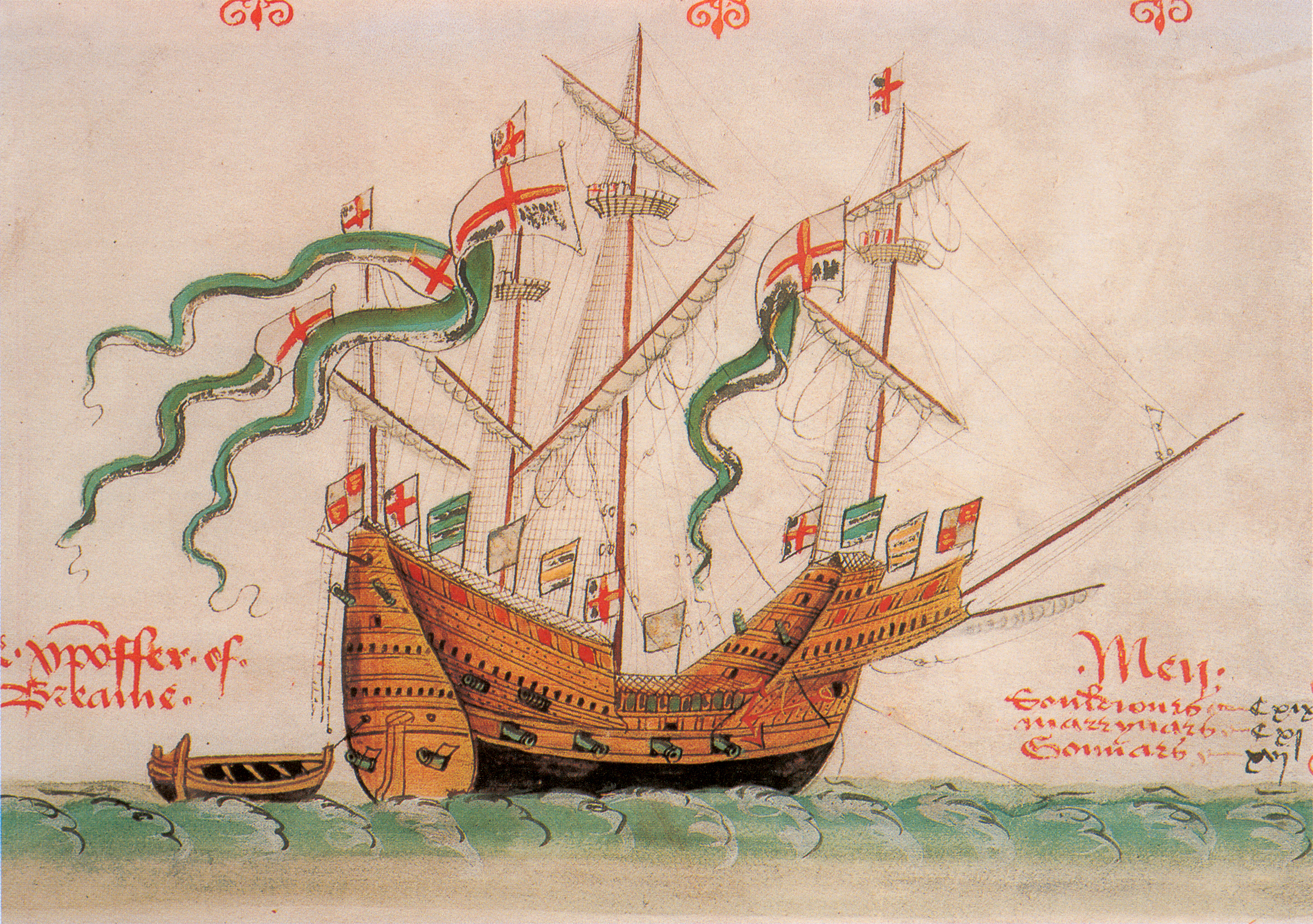
The carrack Christopher of Bremen

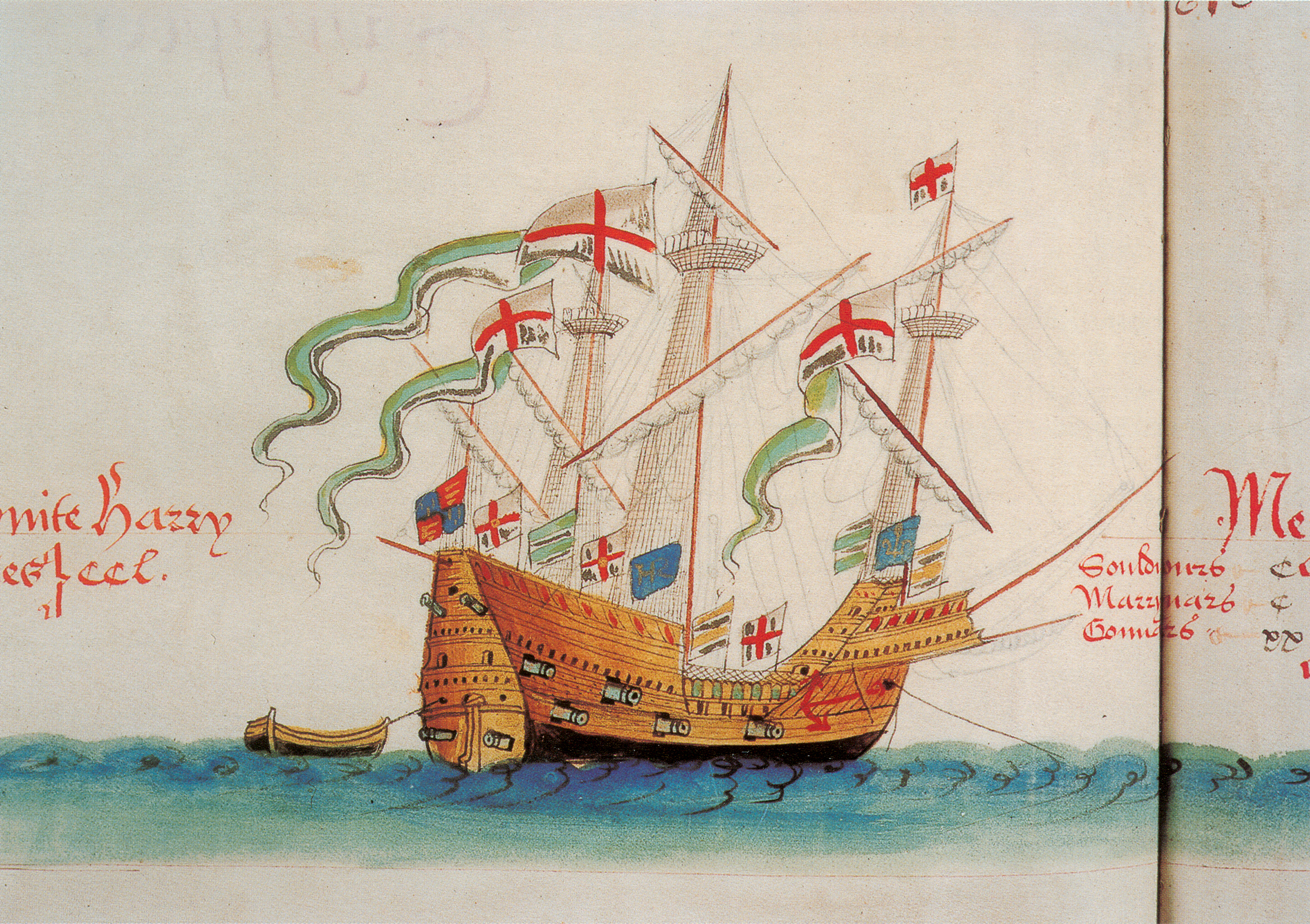
The carrack Trinity Harry

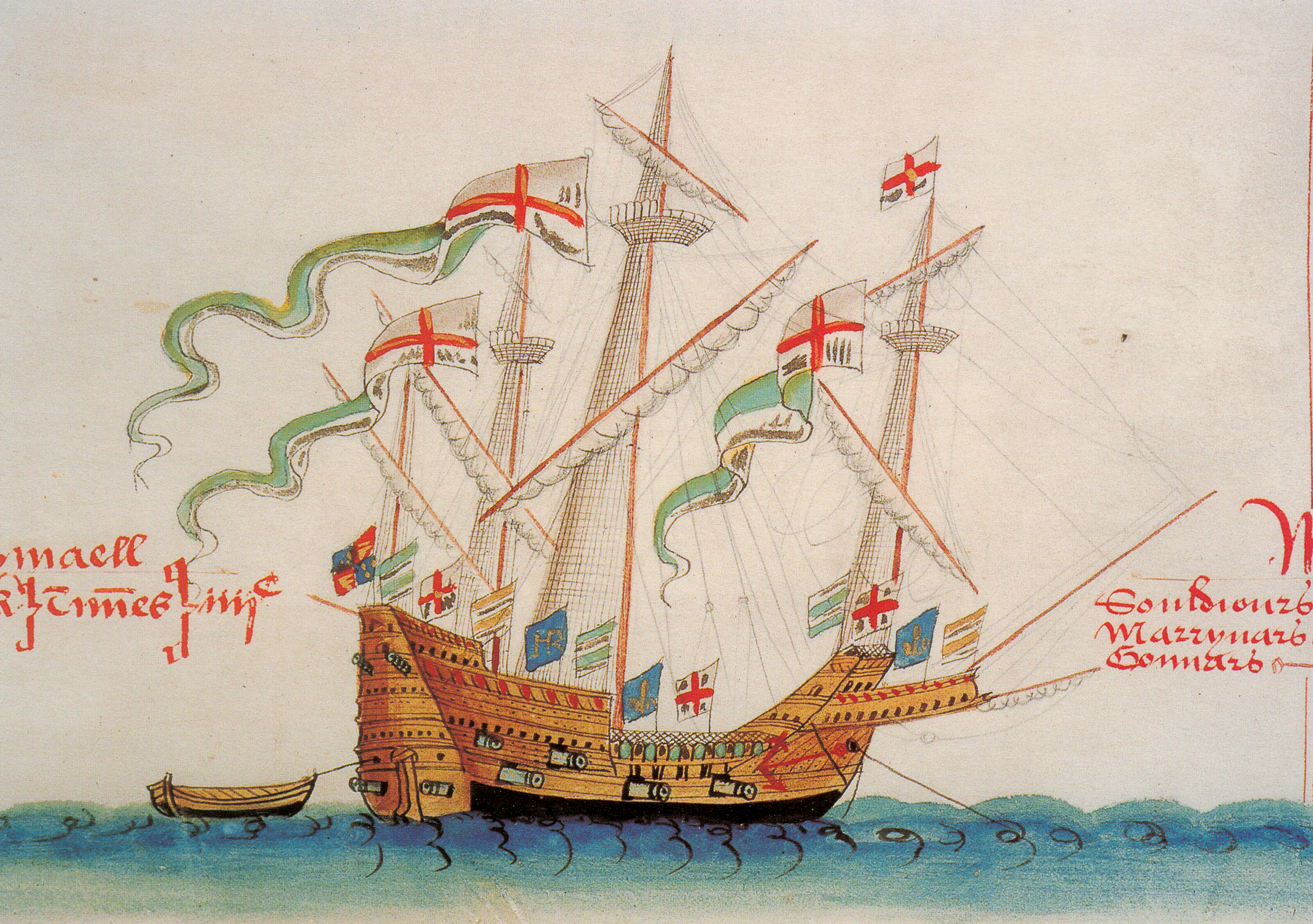
The carrack Small Bark

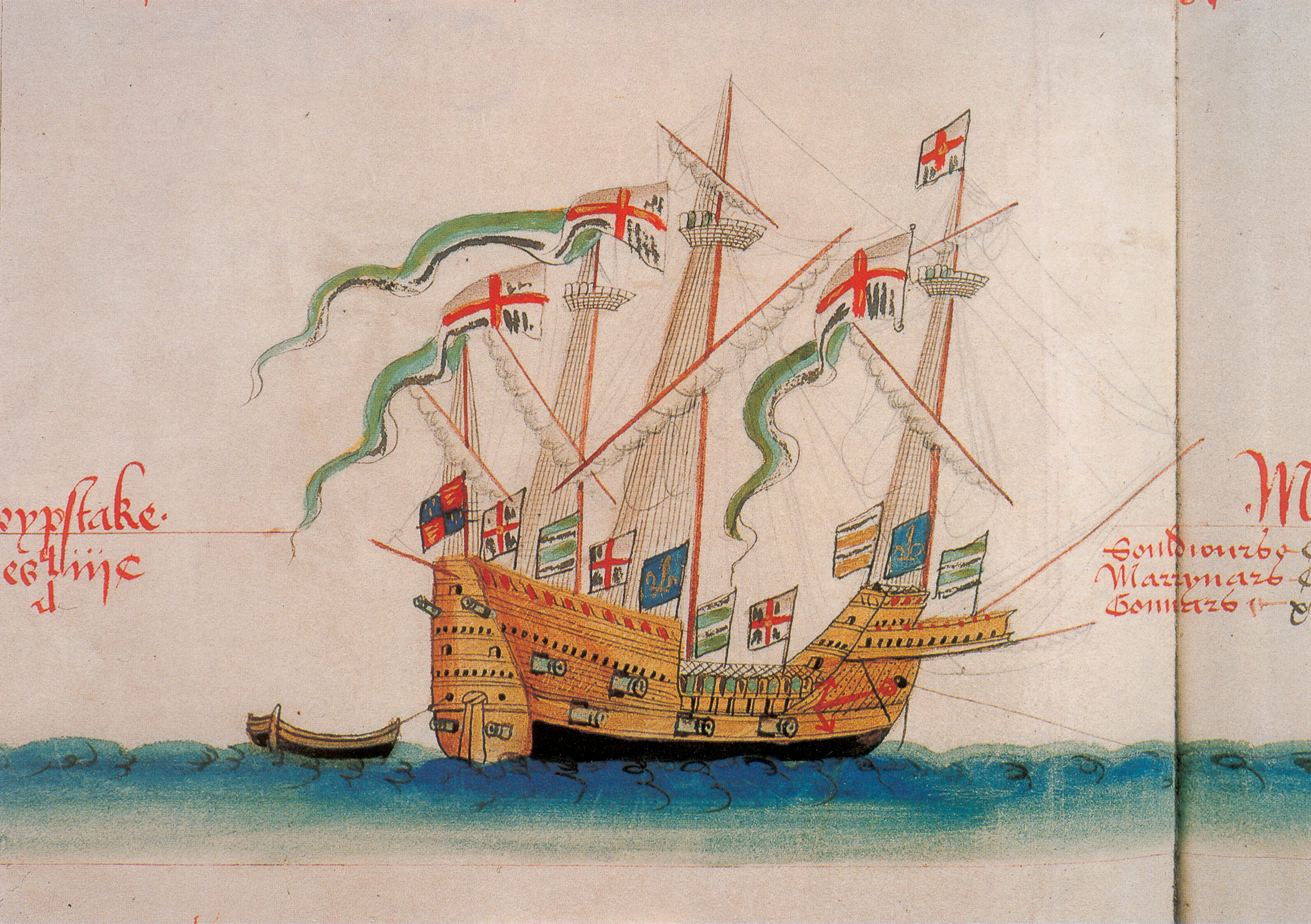
The carrack Sweepstake

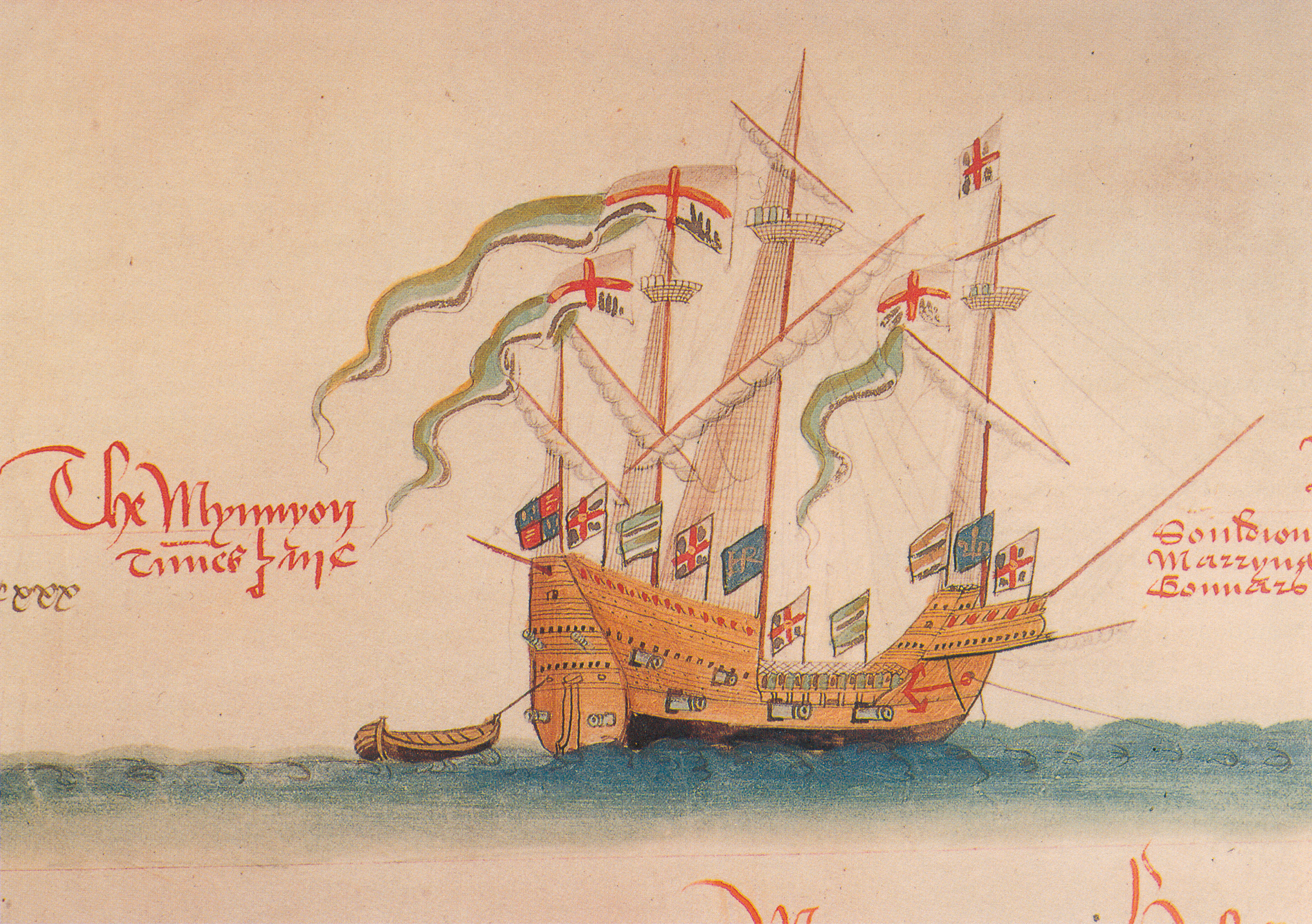
The carrack Minion

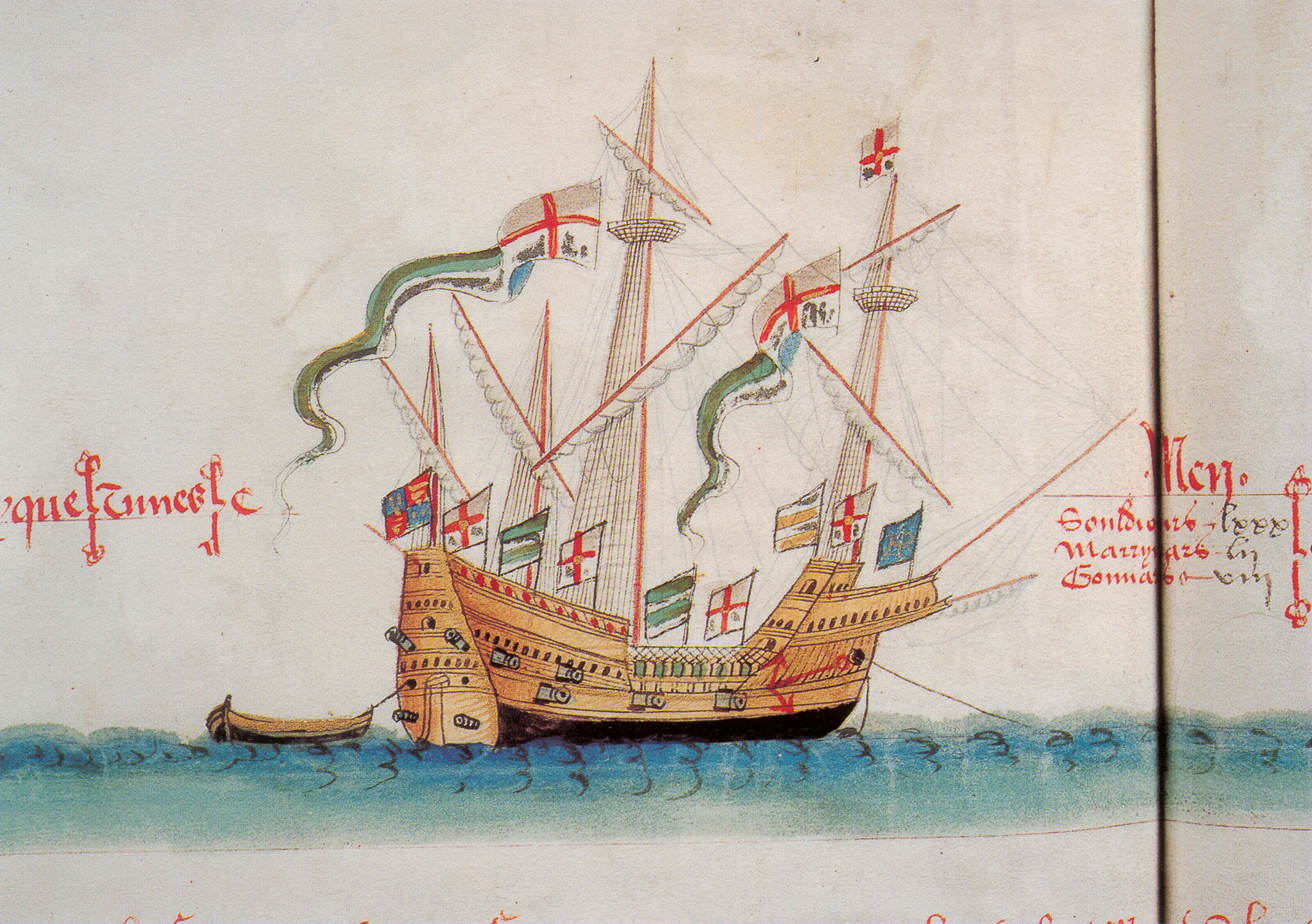
The carrack Lartique

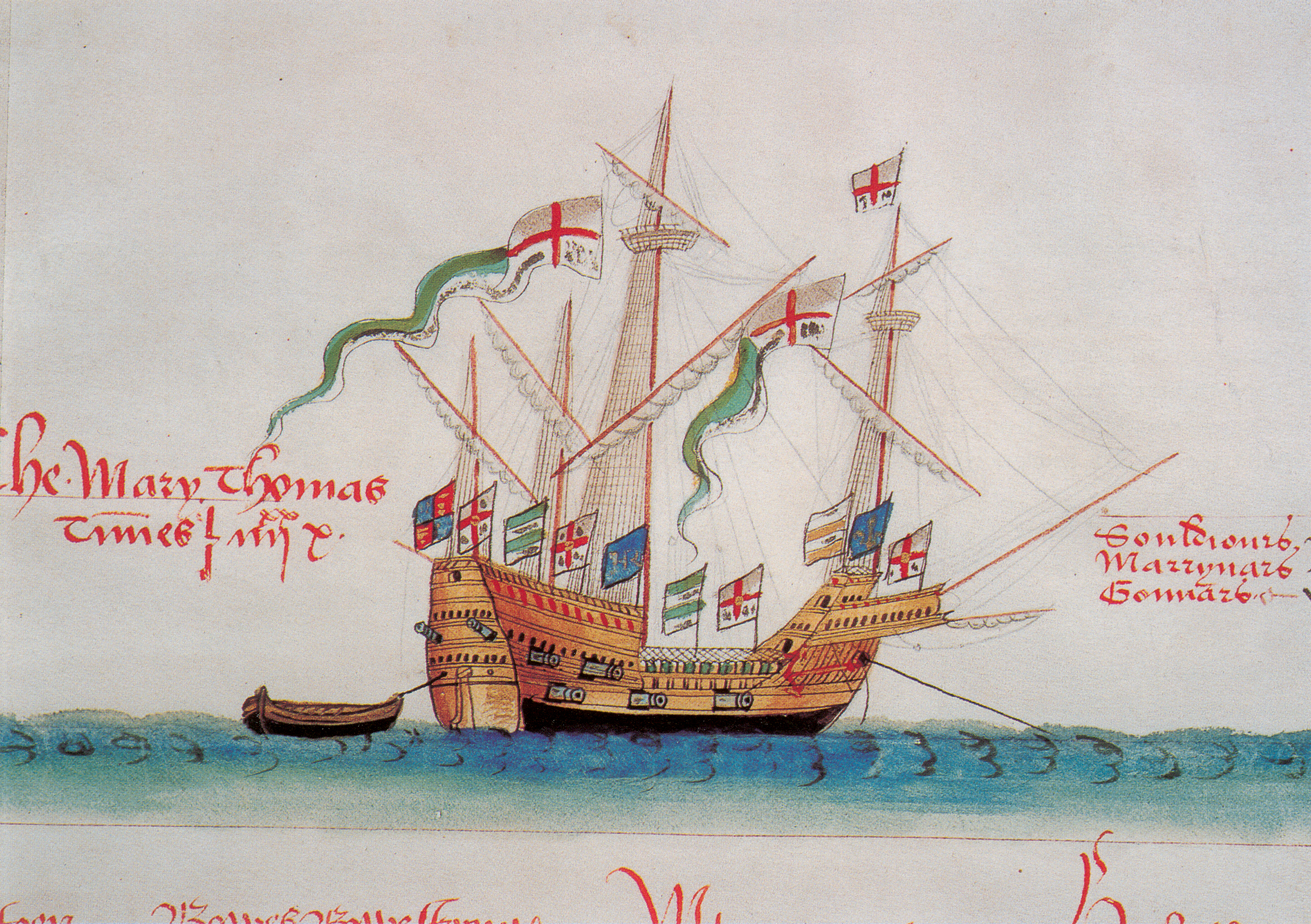
The carrack Mary Thomas

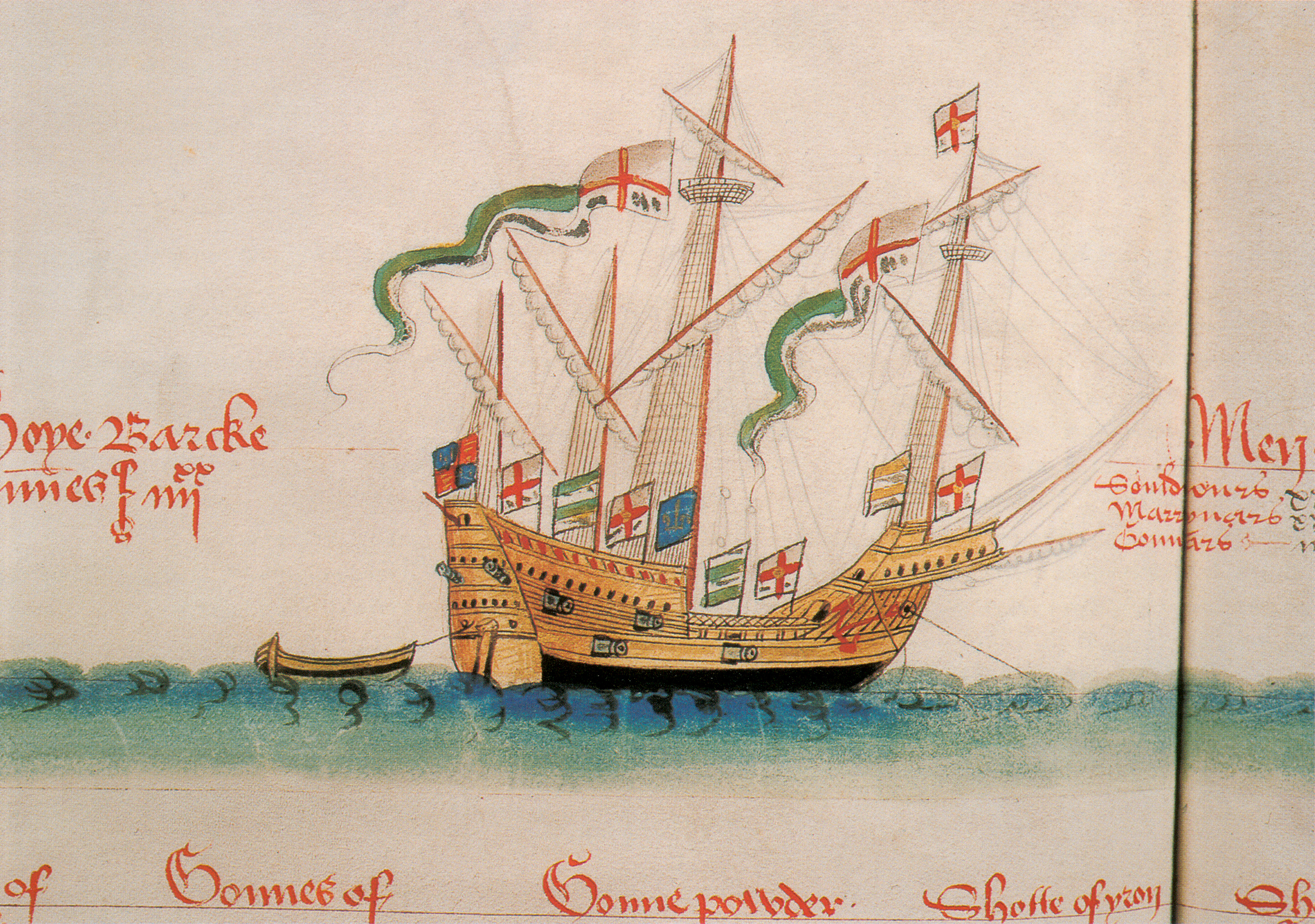
The carrack Hoy Bark

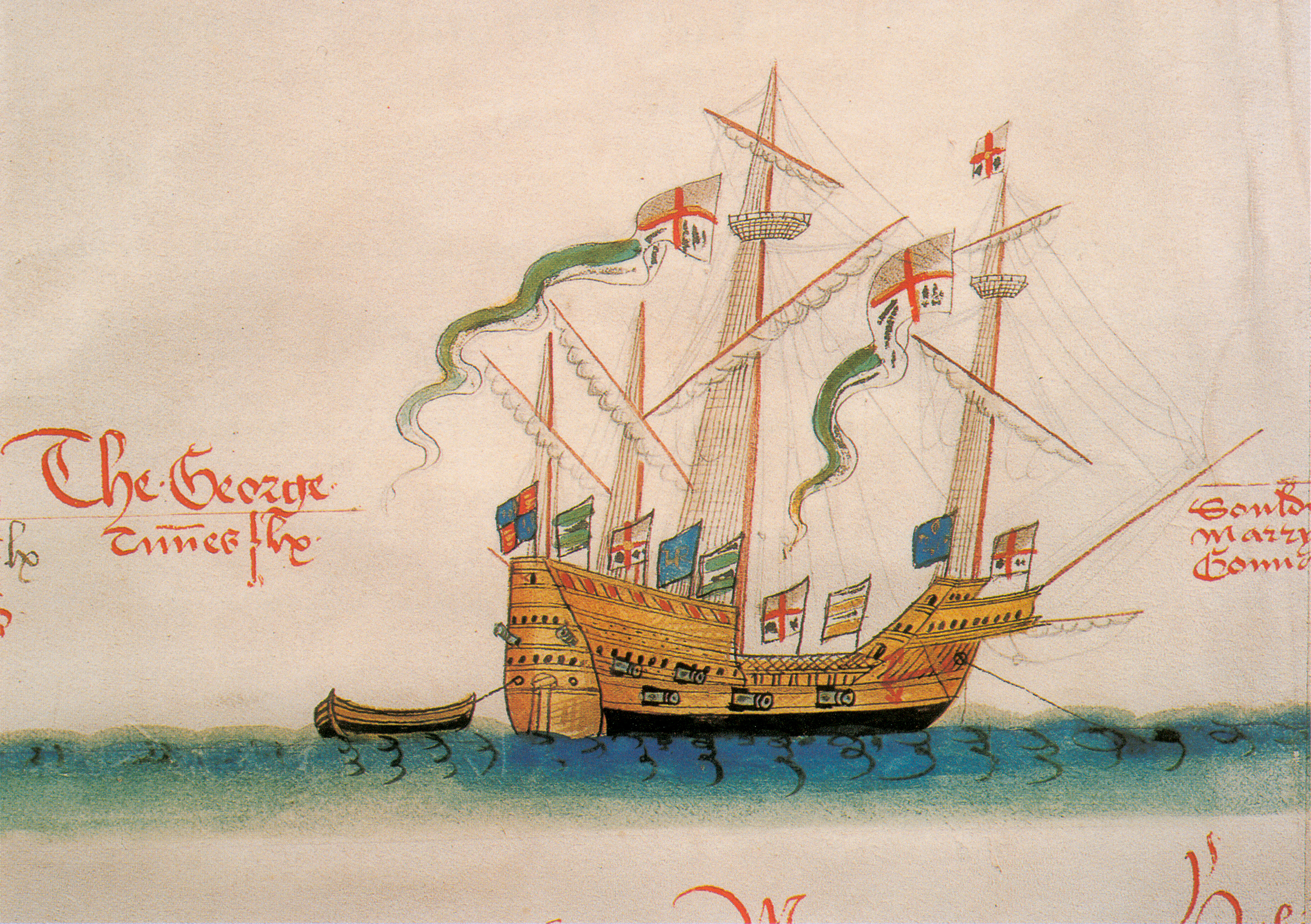
The carrack George

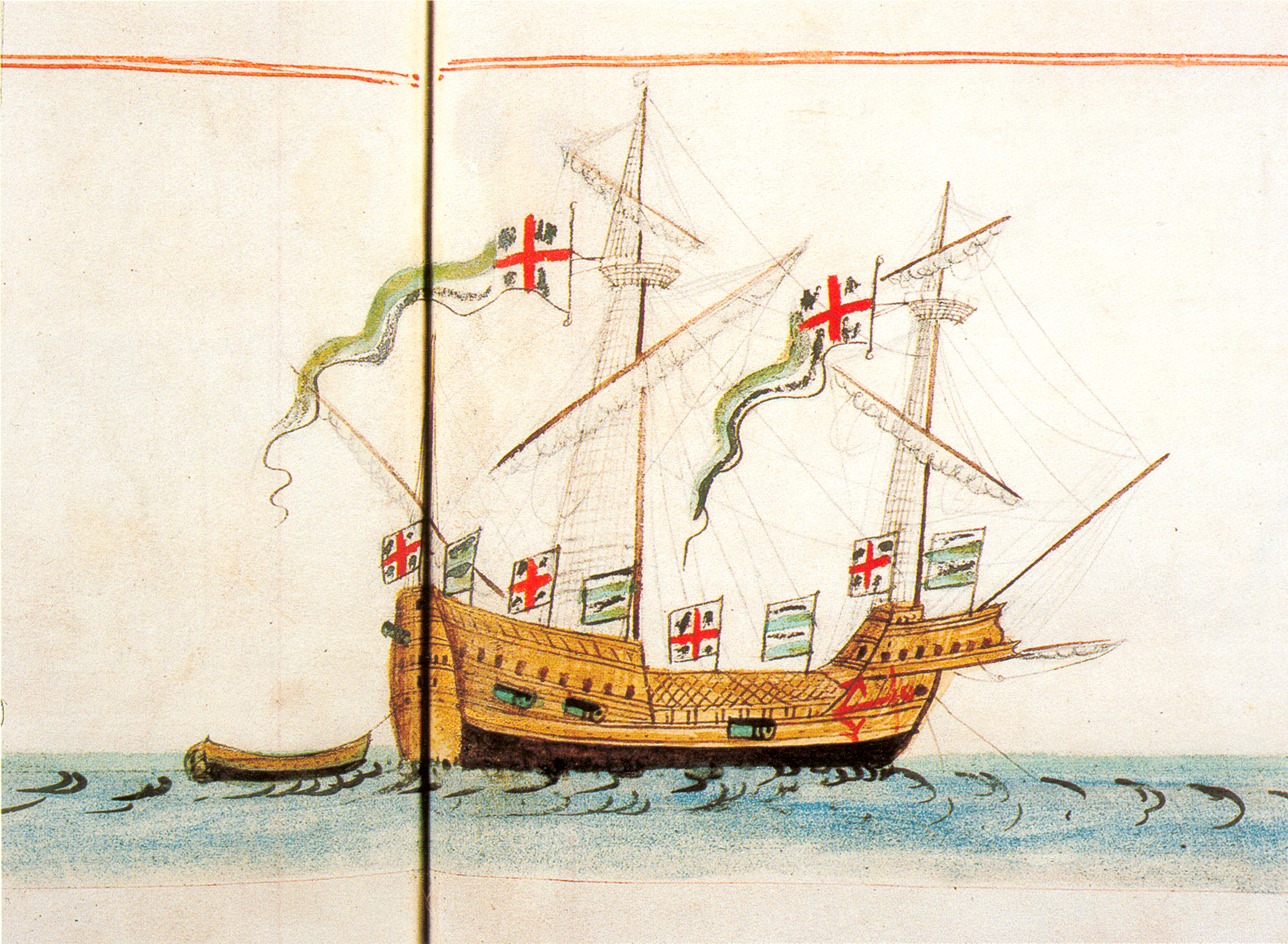
The galleass Mary James

== The second roll: 15 Galleasses (English military galleons with lower forecastle and aftcastle) ==
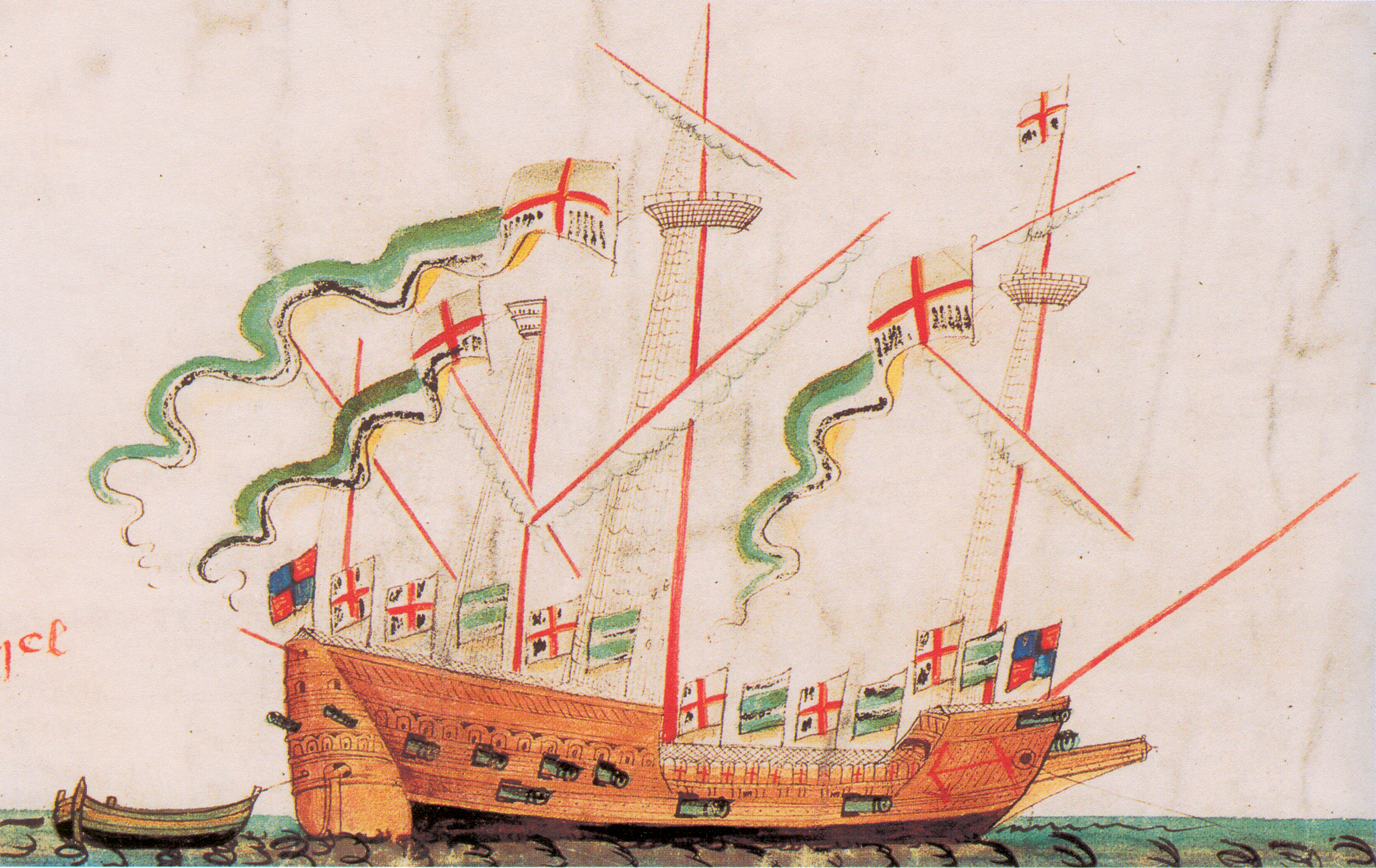
The galleass Grand Mistress

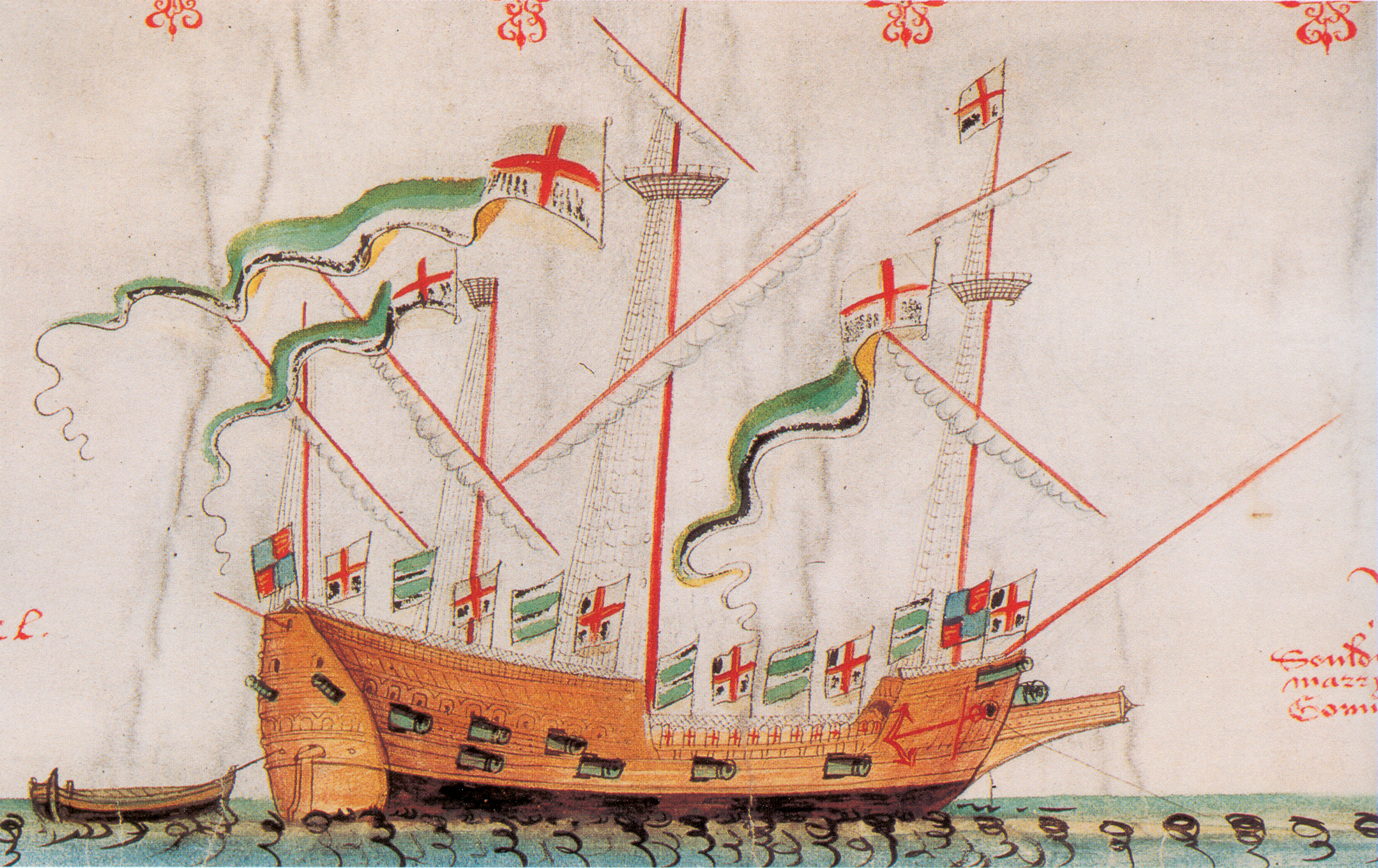
The galleass Anne Gallant

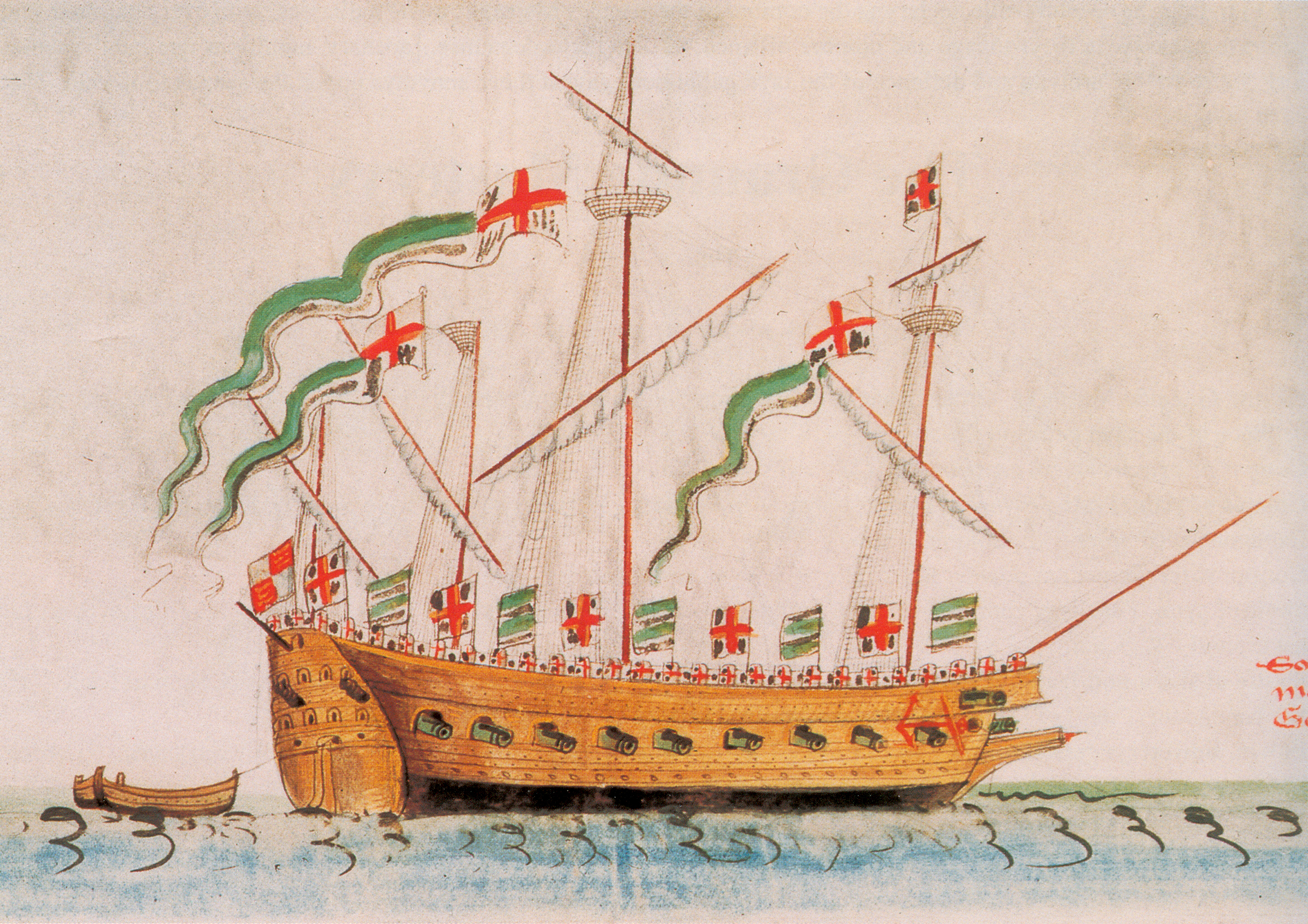
The galleass Heart

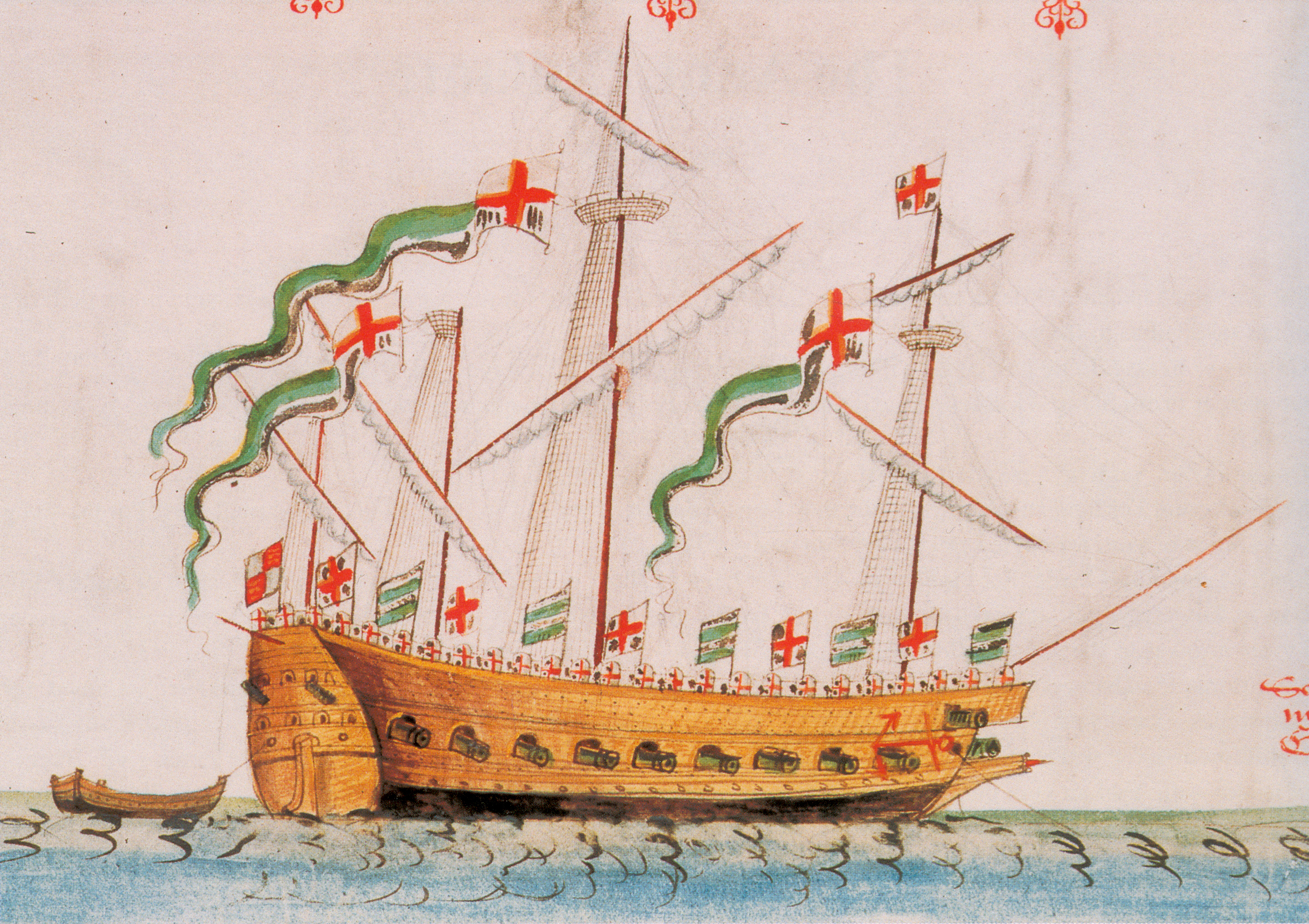
The galleass Antelope

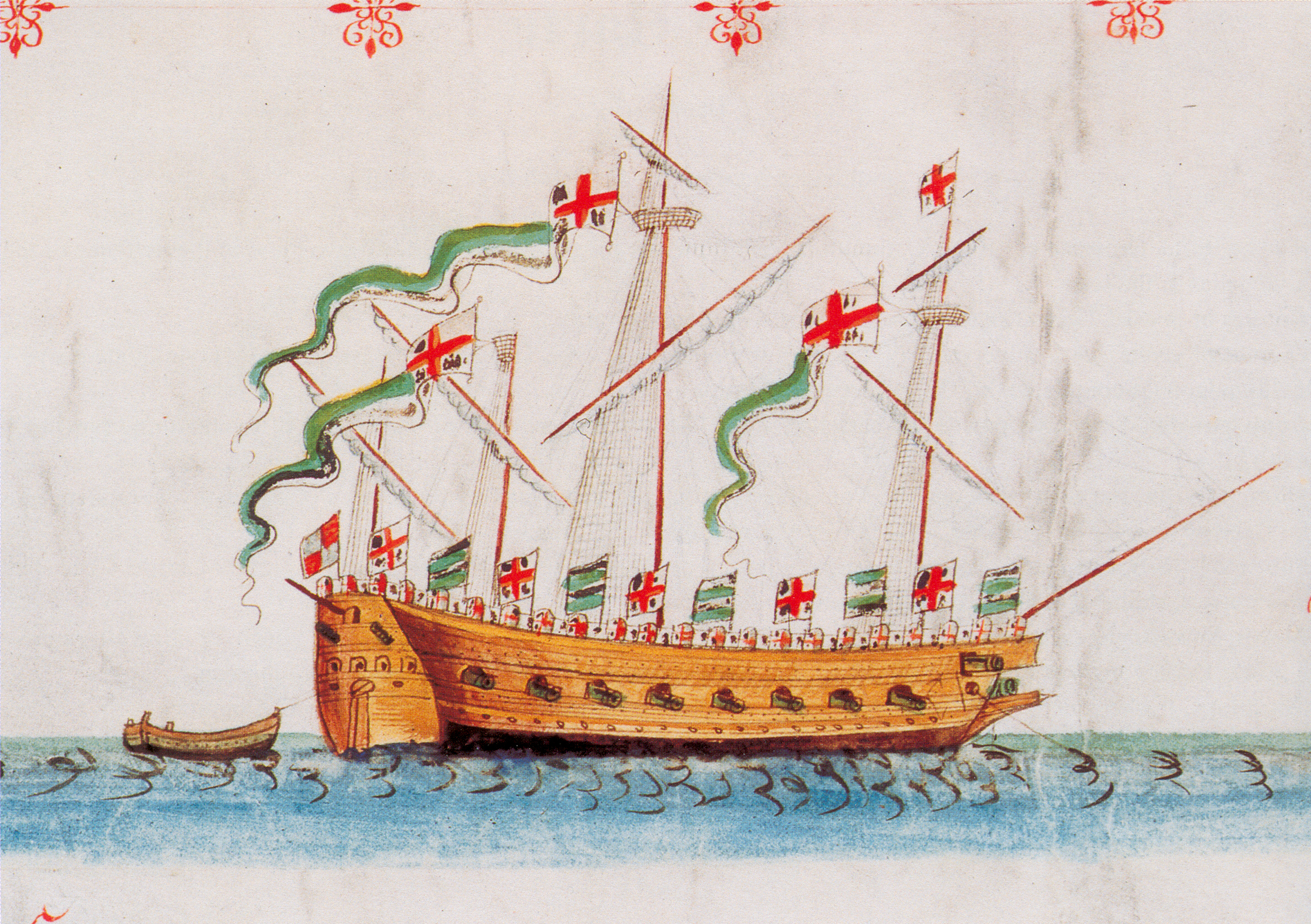
The galleass Tiger

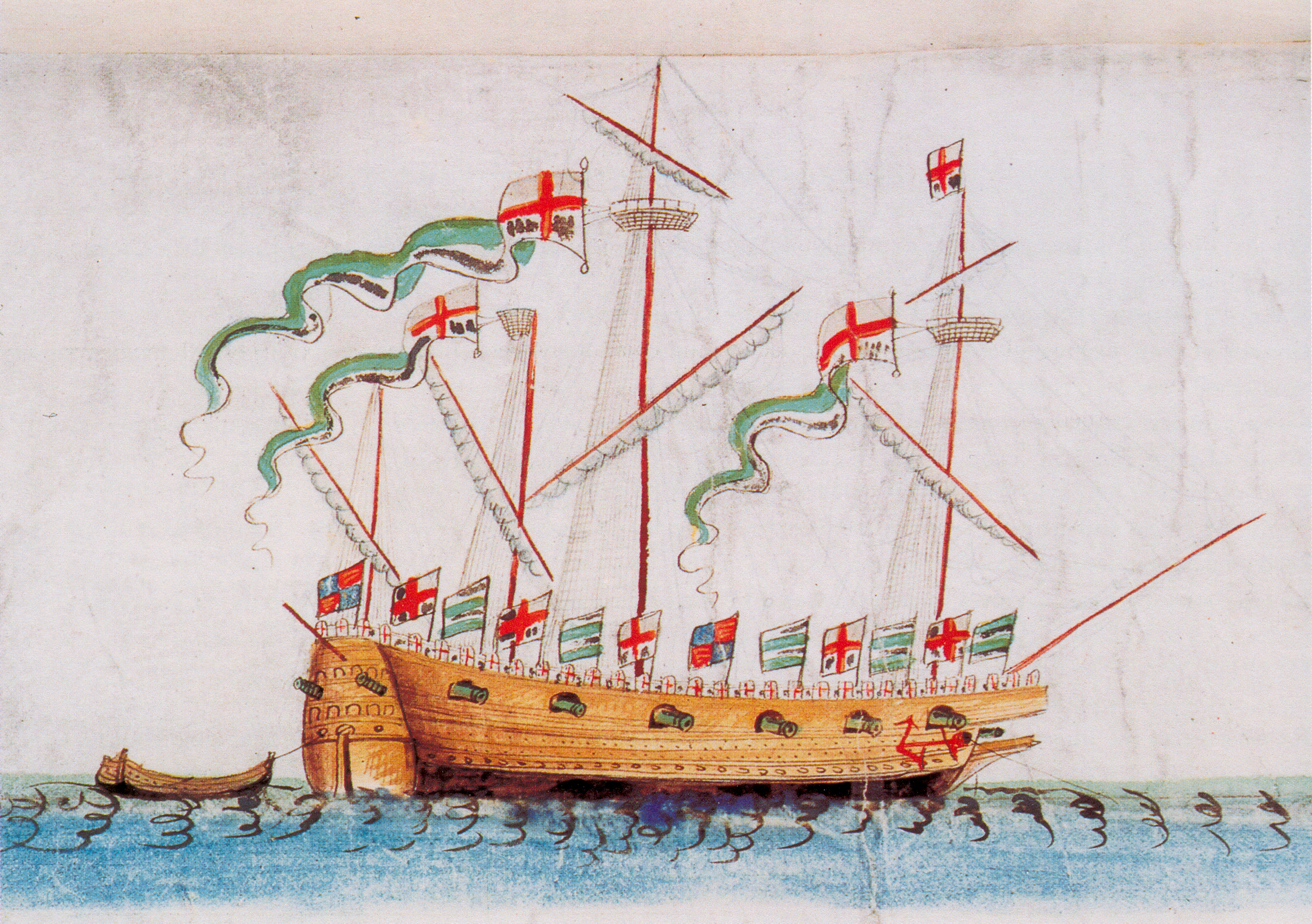
The galleass Bull

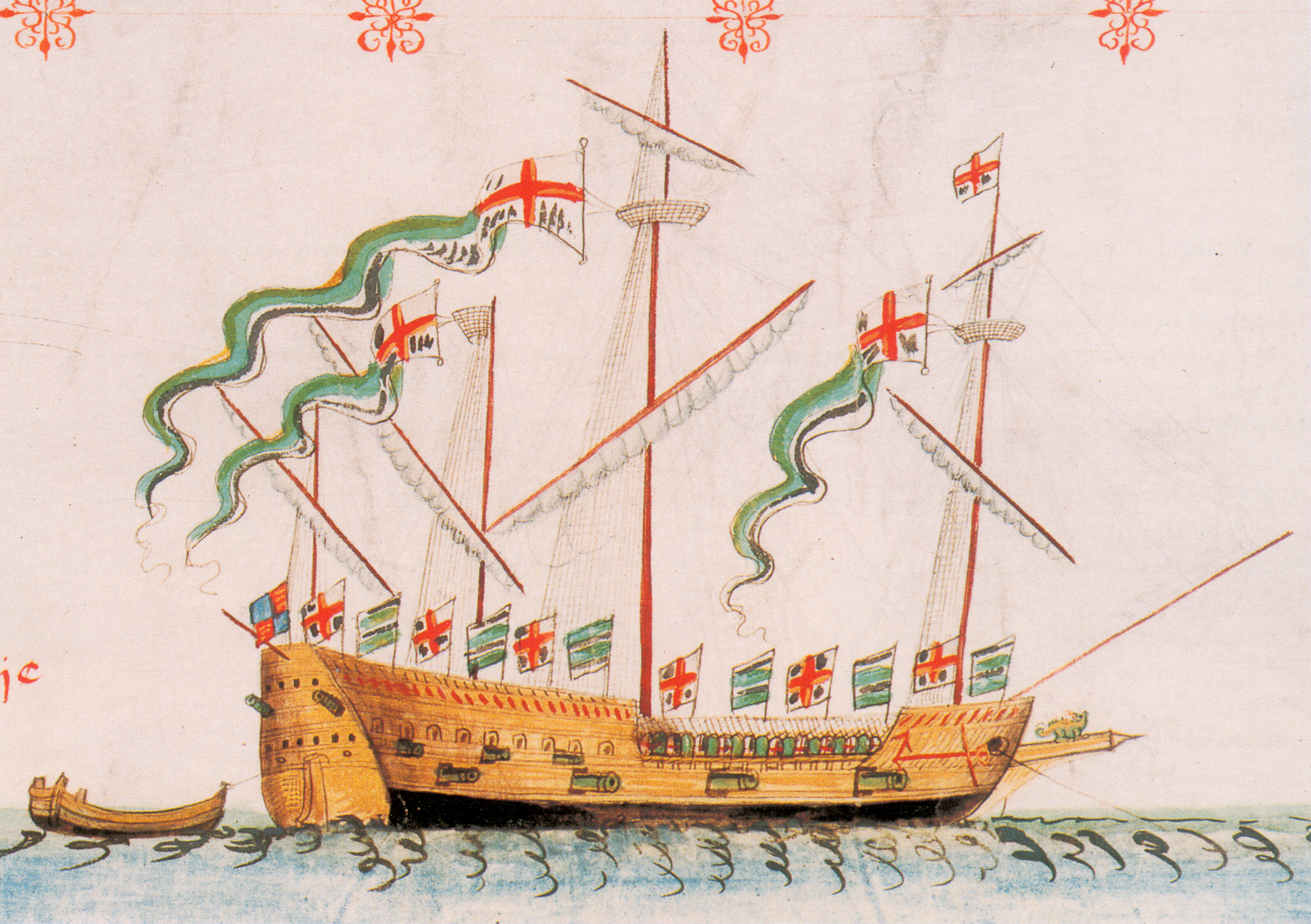
The galleass Salamander

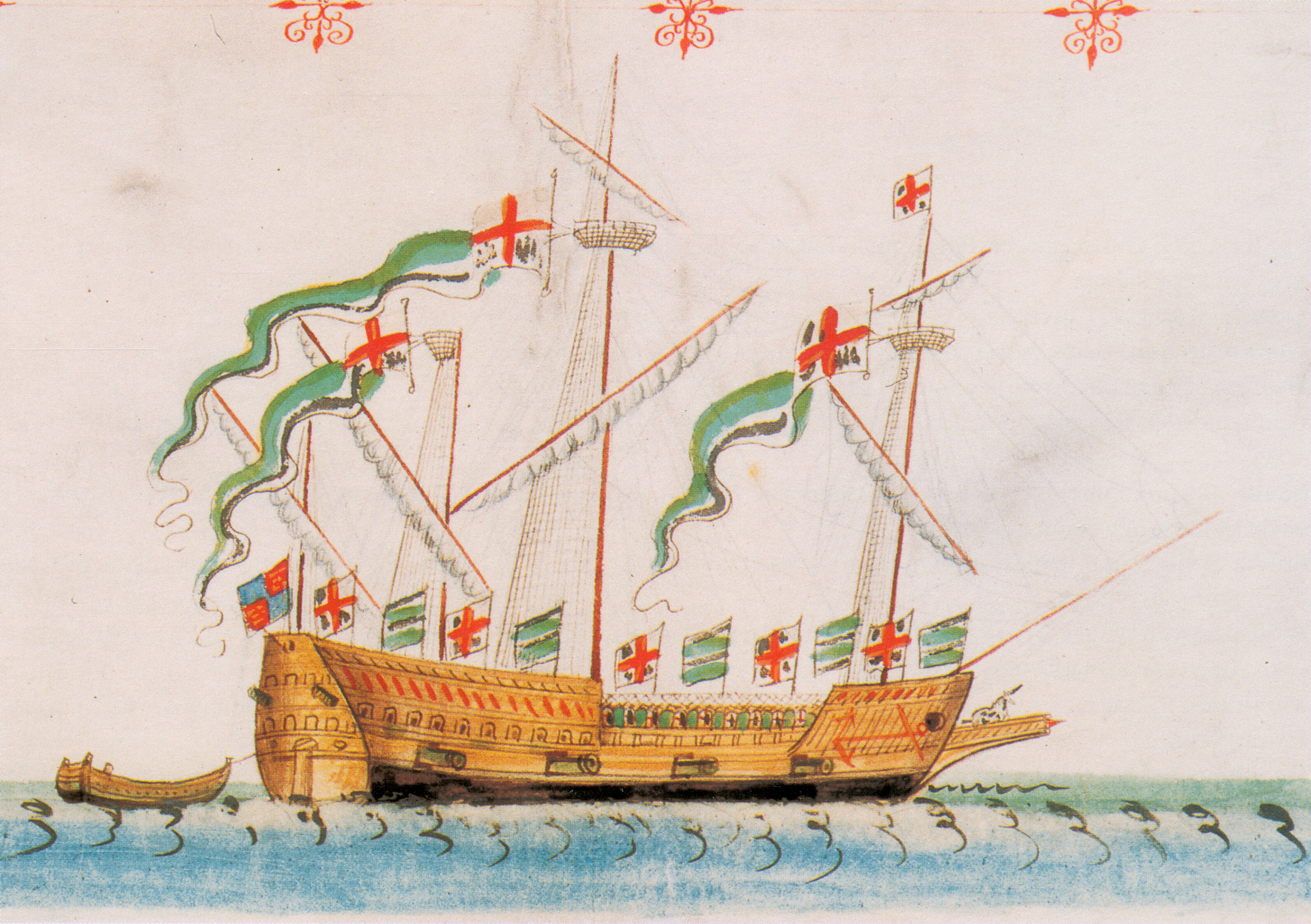
The galleass Unicorn

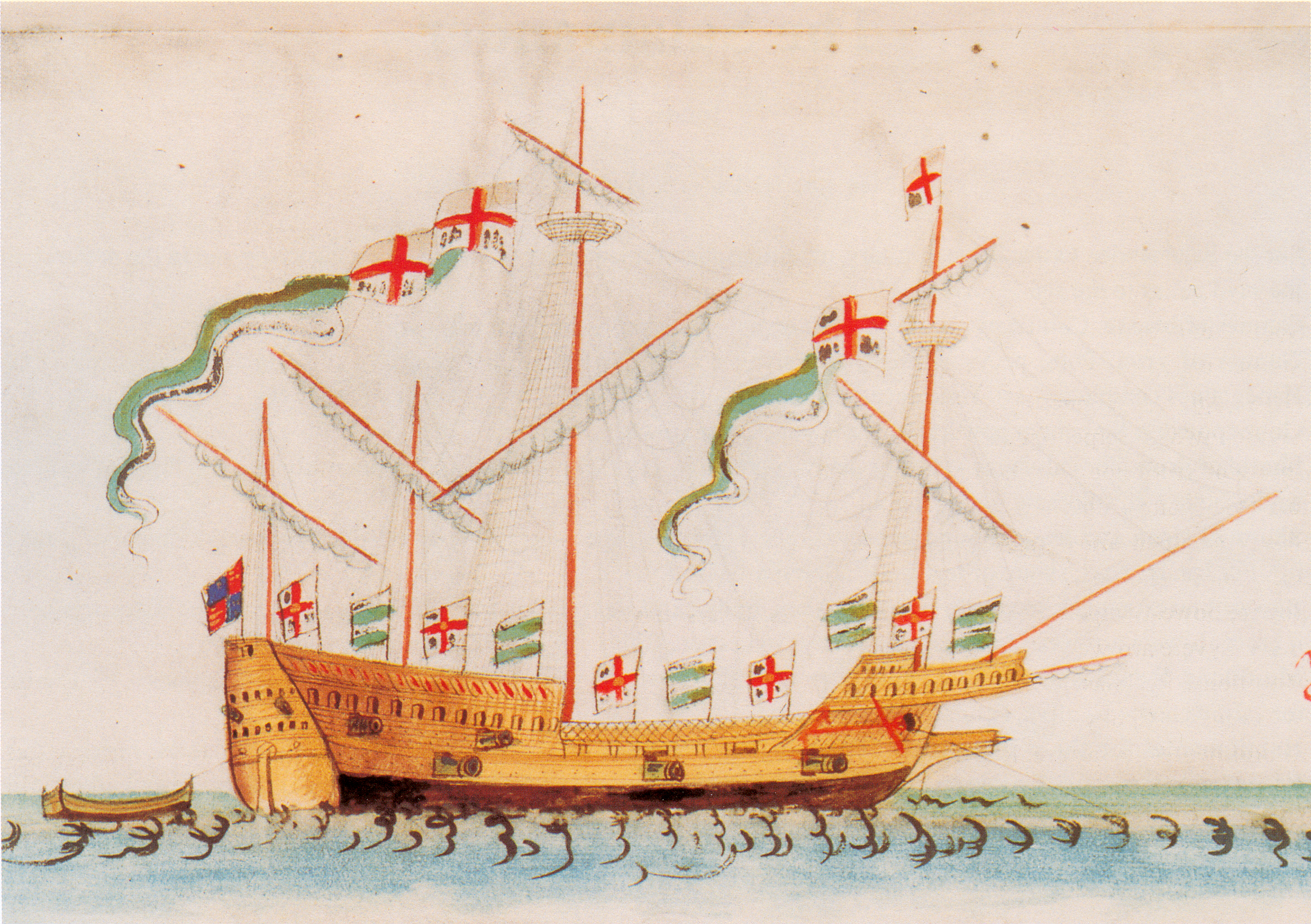
The galleass Swallow

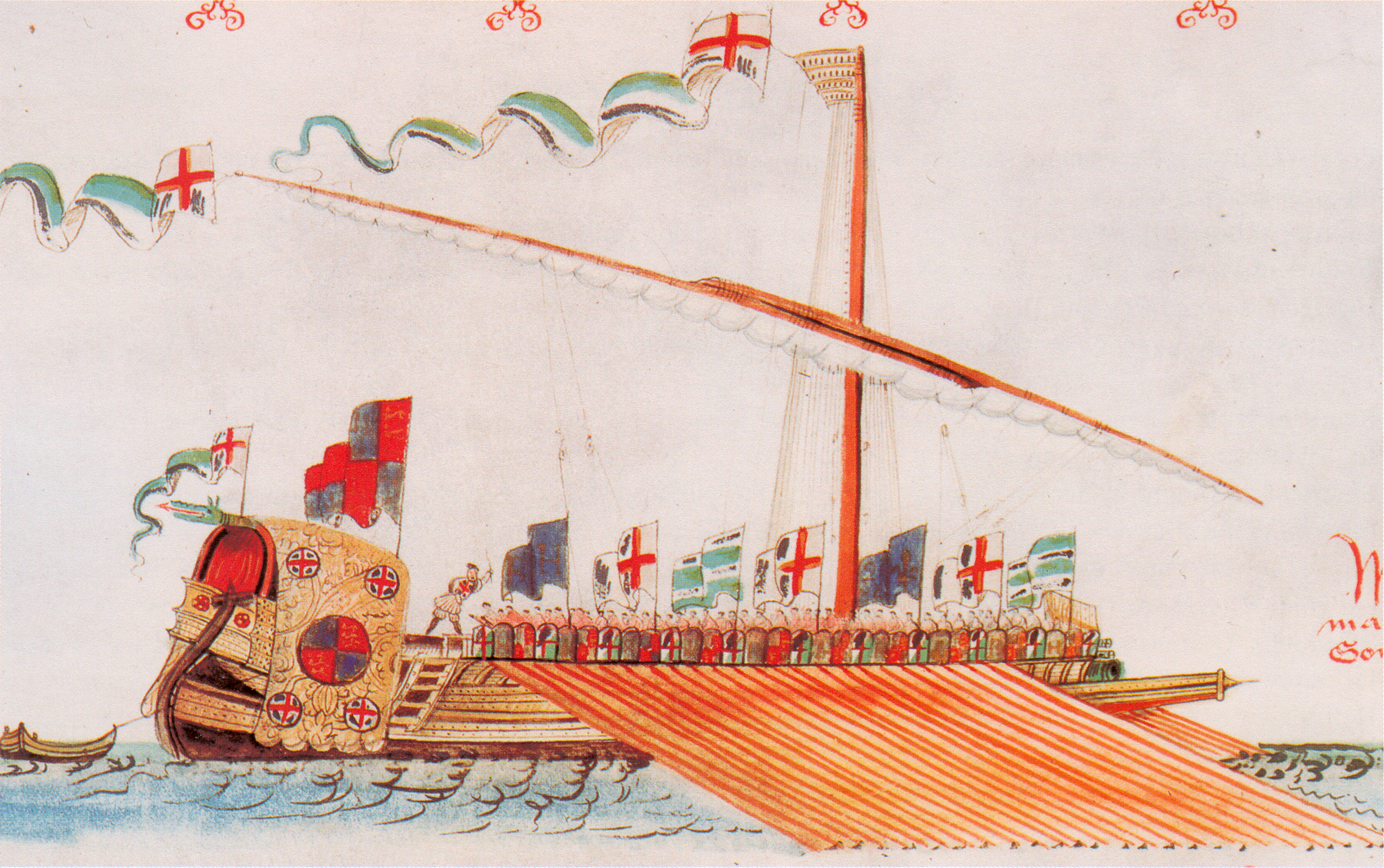
The Galley Subtle

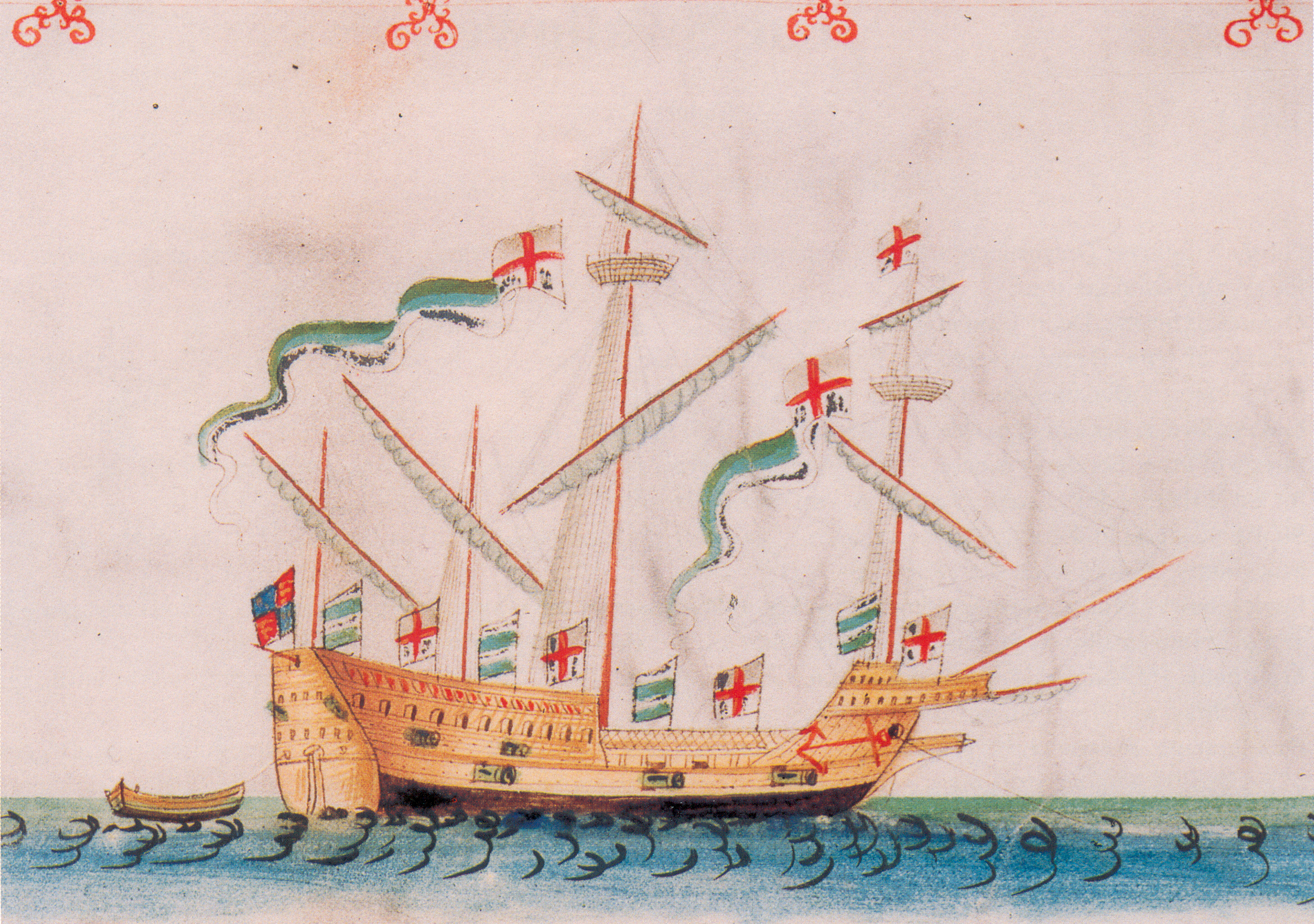
The galleass New Bark

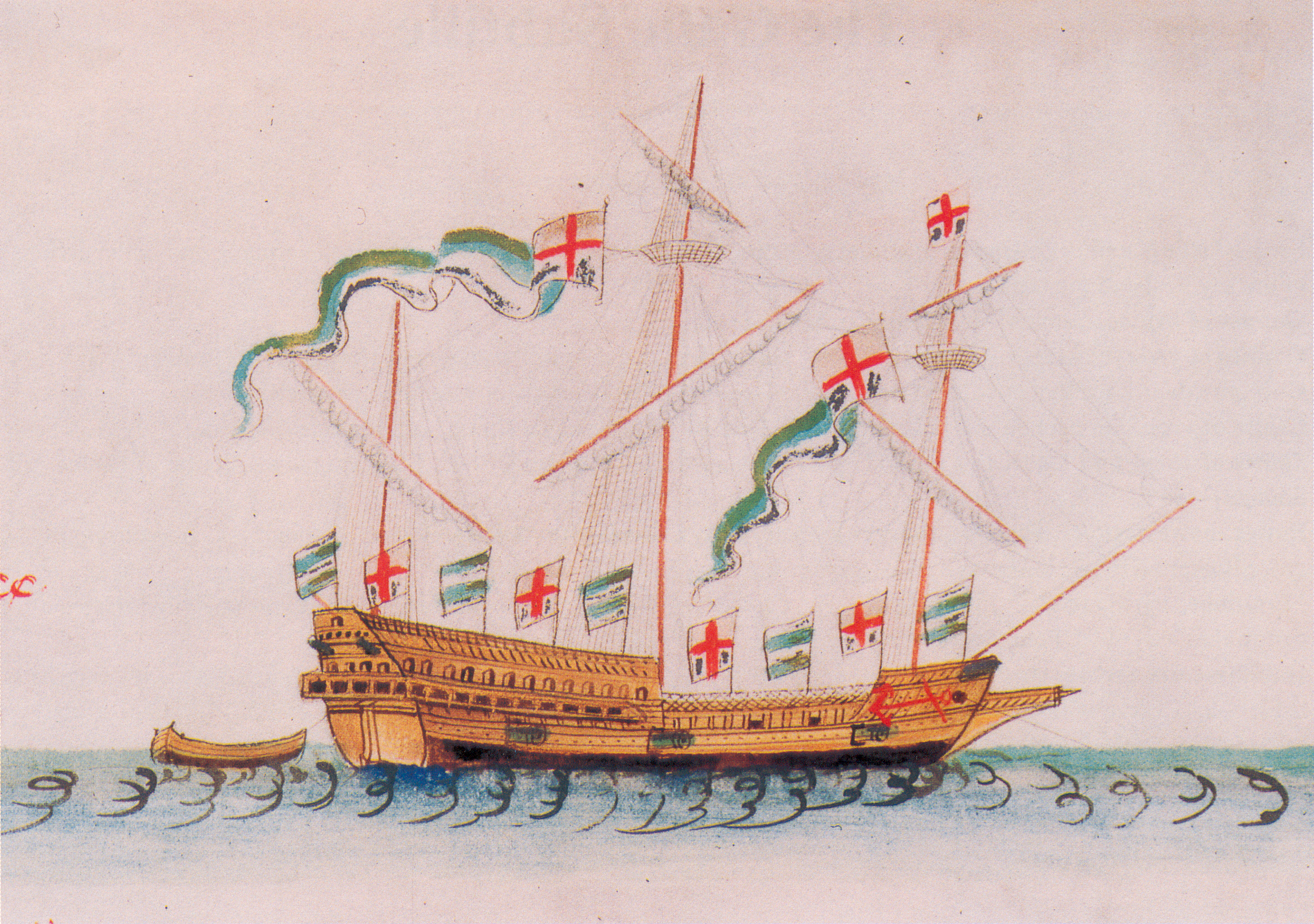
The galleass Greyhound

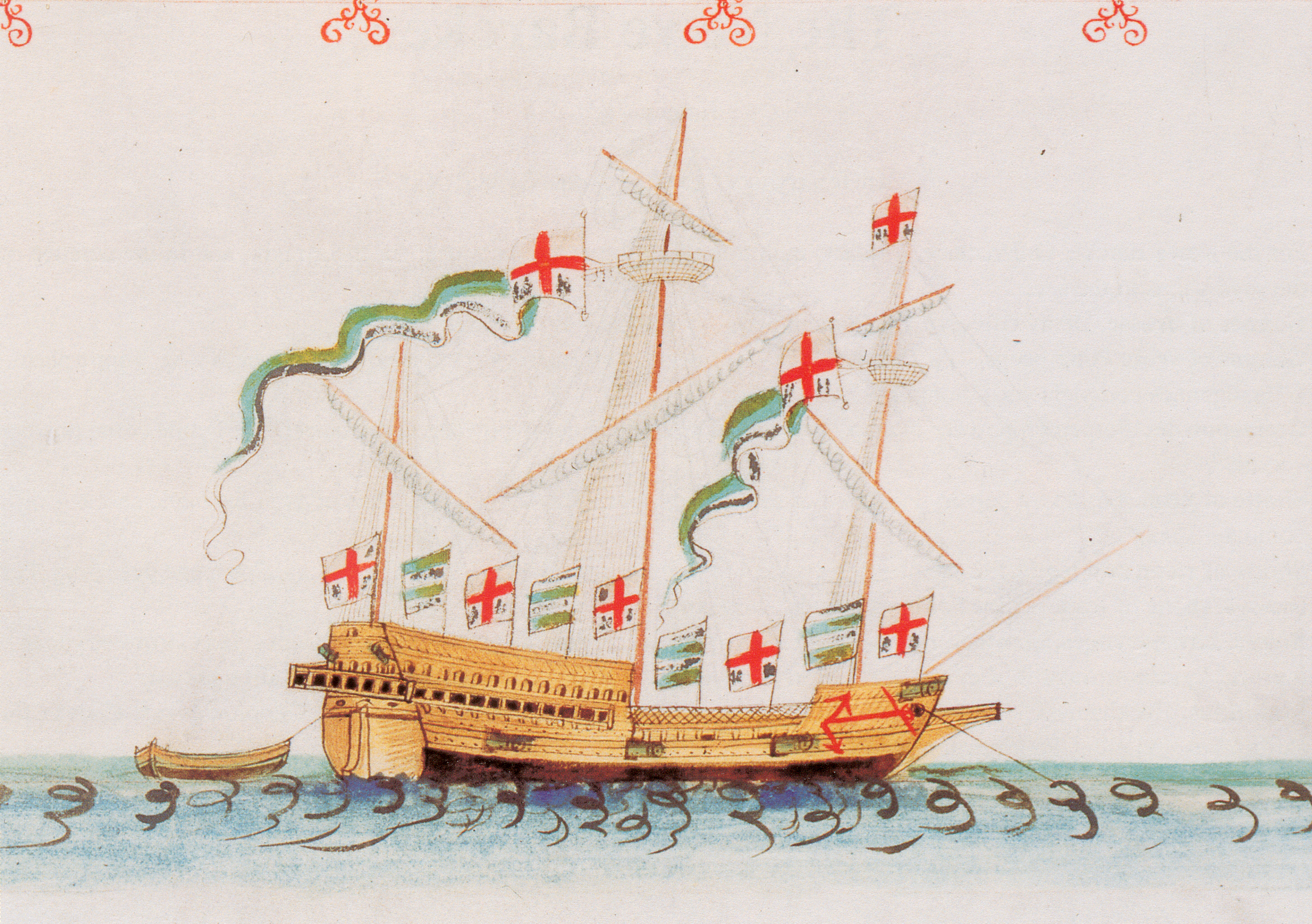
The galleass Jennet

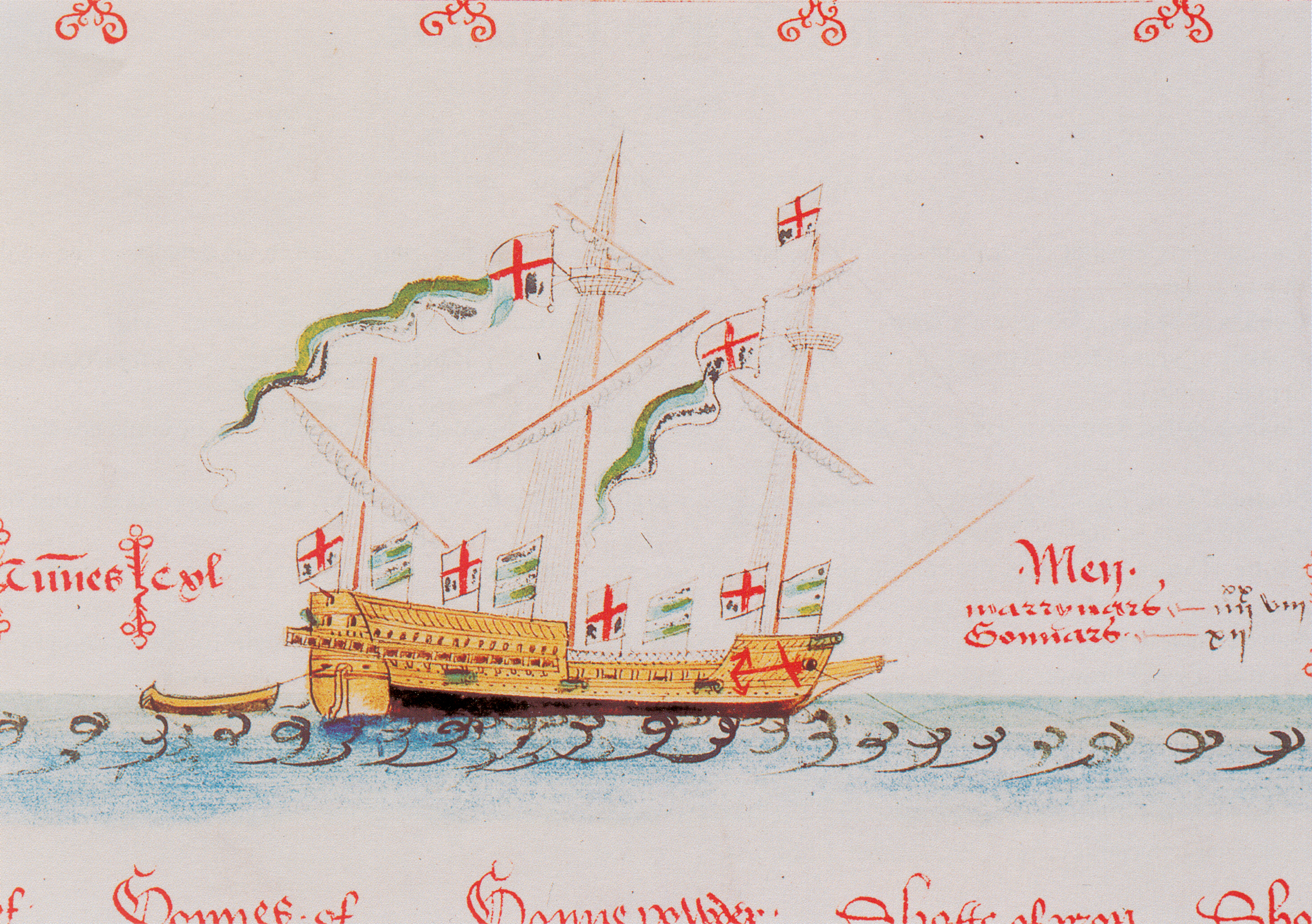
The galleass Lion

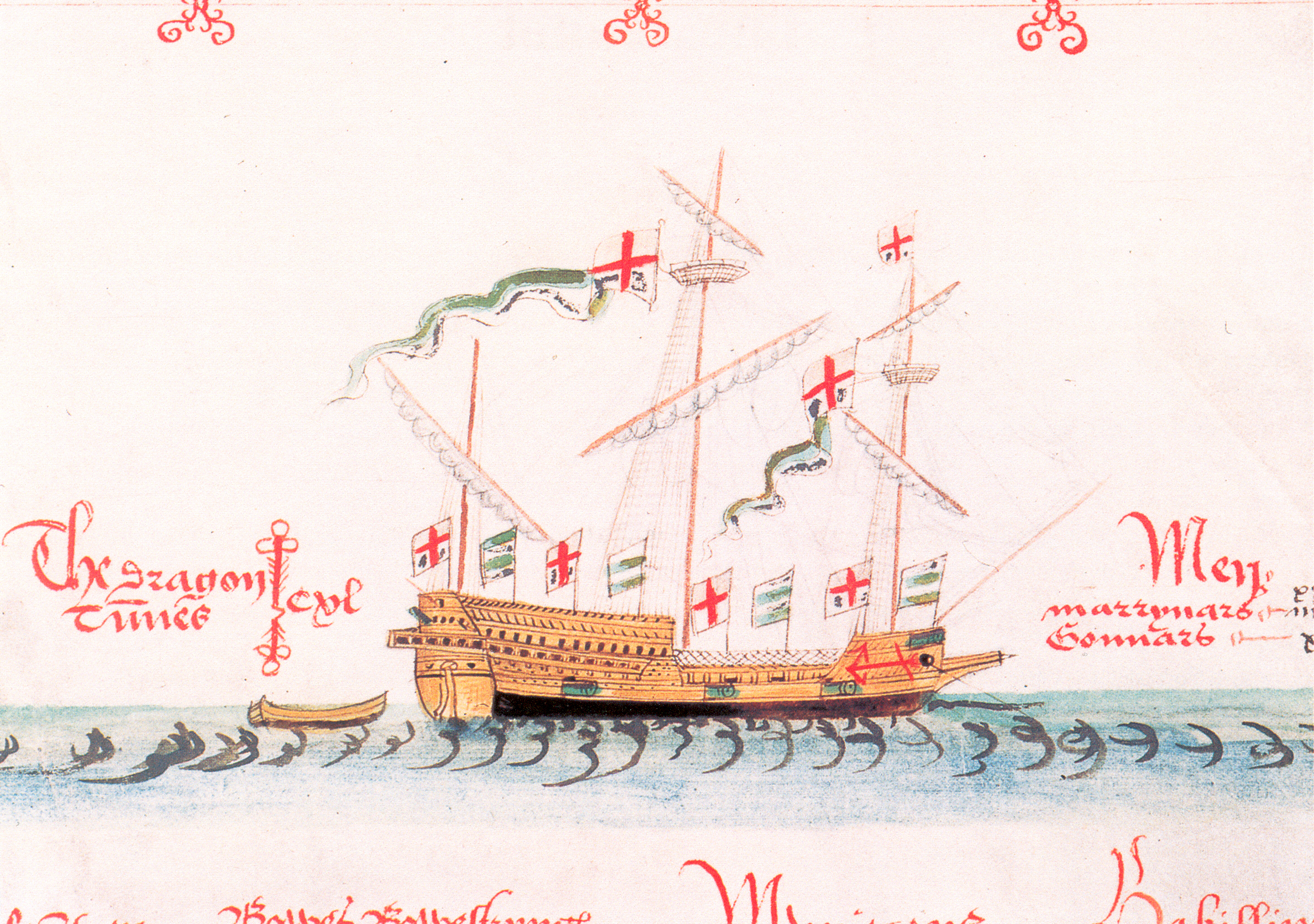
The galleass Dragon

== The third roll: 23 pinnaces and rowbarges ==
Rowbarge: A war galley or flat boat propelled by sails and rowing oars. It is believed that Henry VIII influenced the design of rowbarges and similar galleys

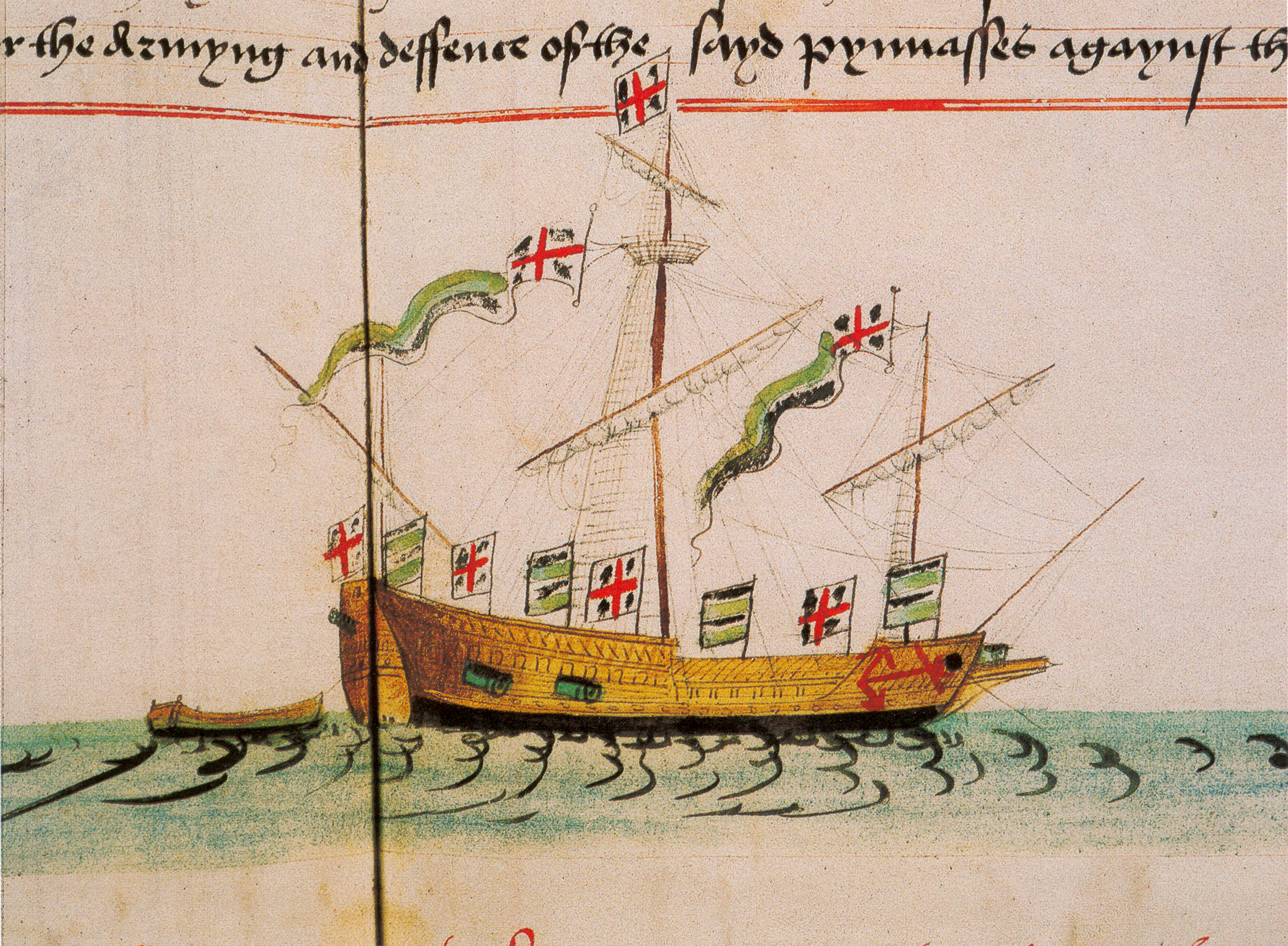
The pinnace Falcon

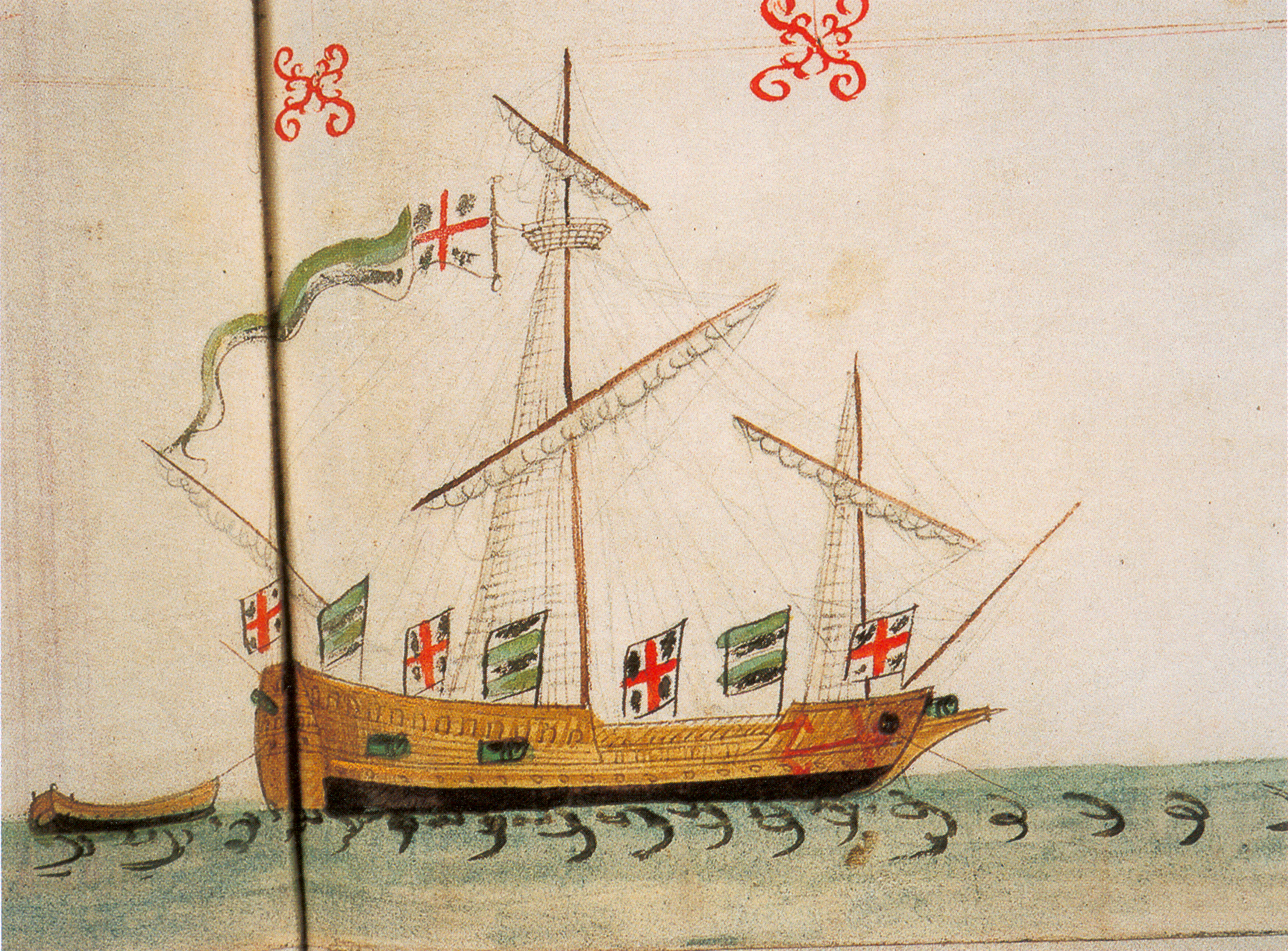
The pinnace Saker

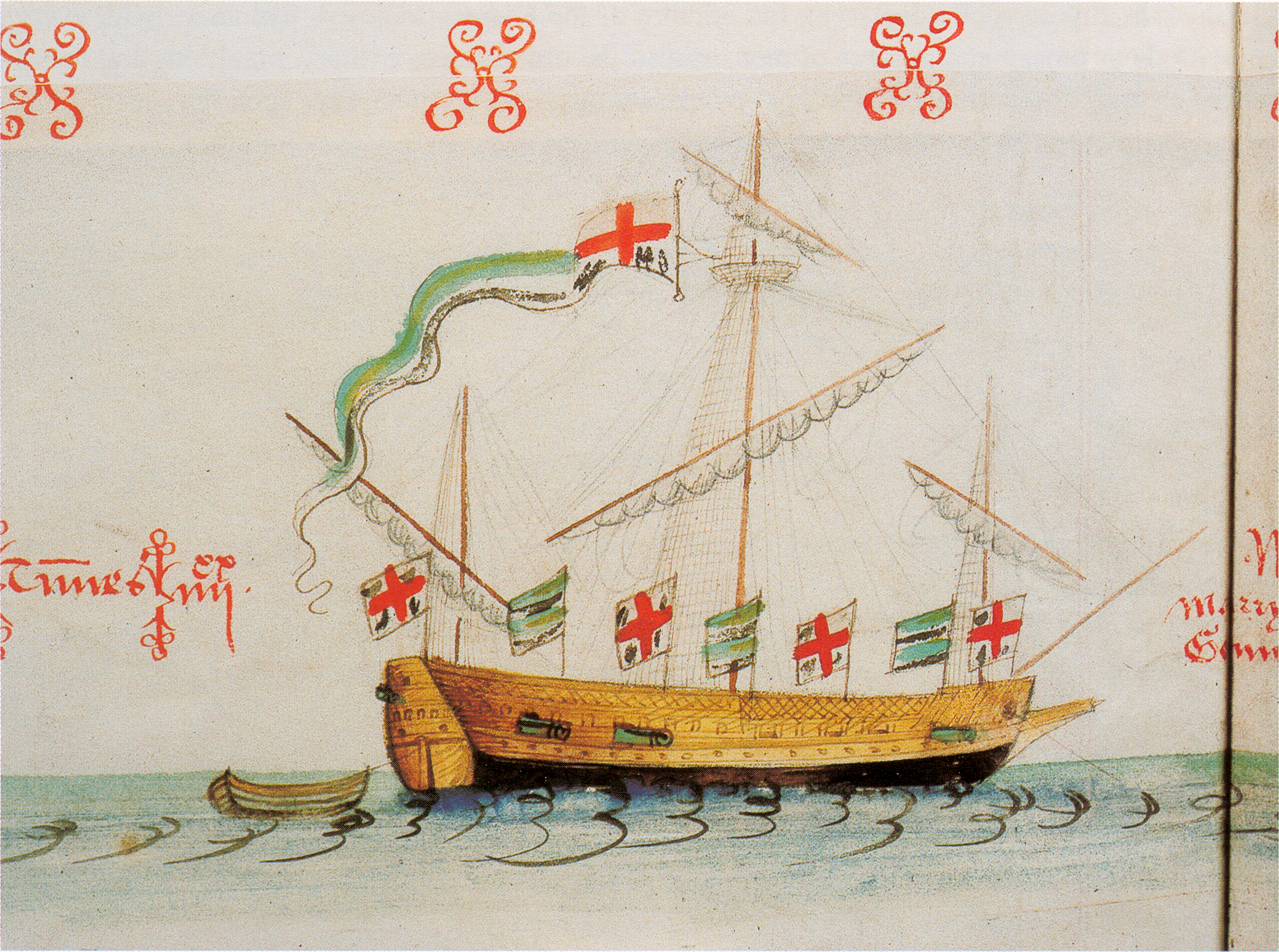
The pinnace Hind

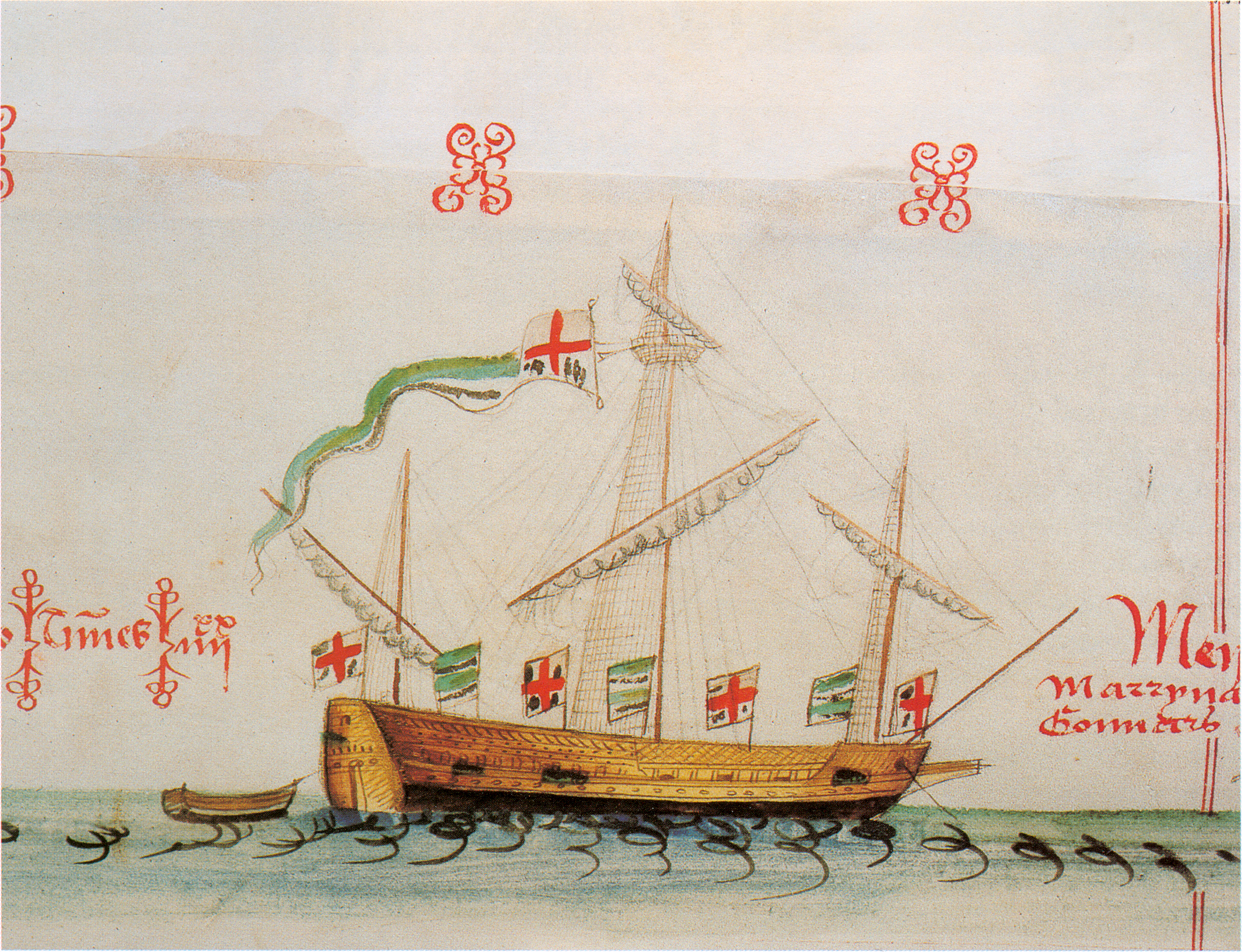
The pinnace Roo

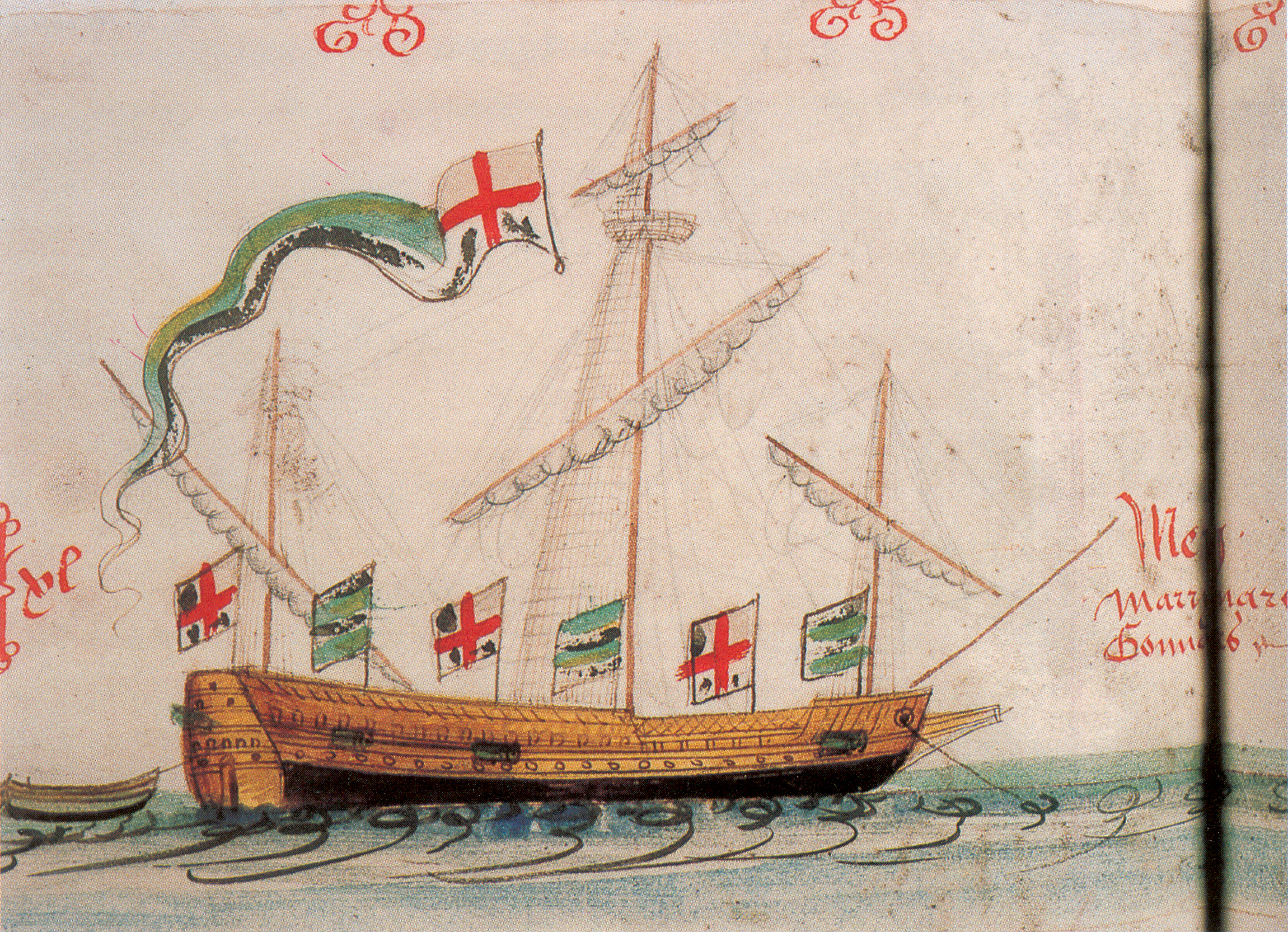
The pinnace Phoenix

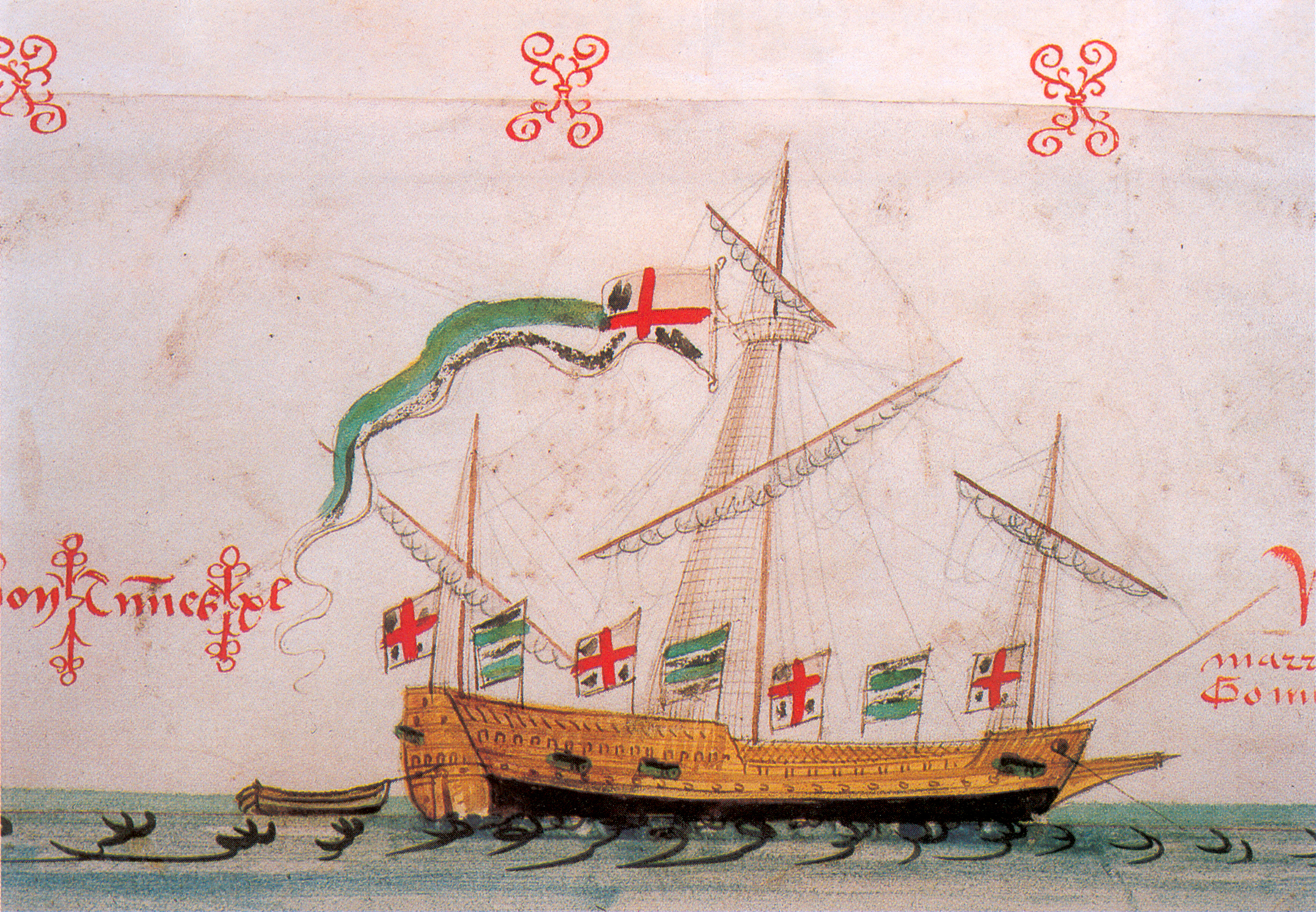
The pinnace Merlin

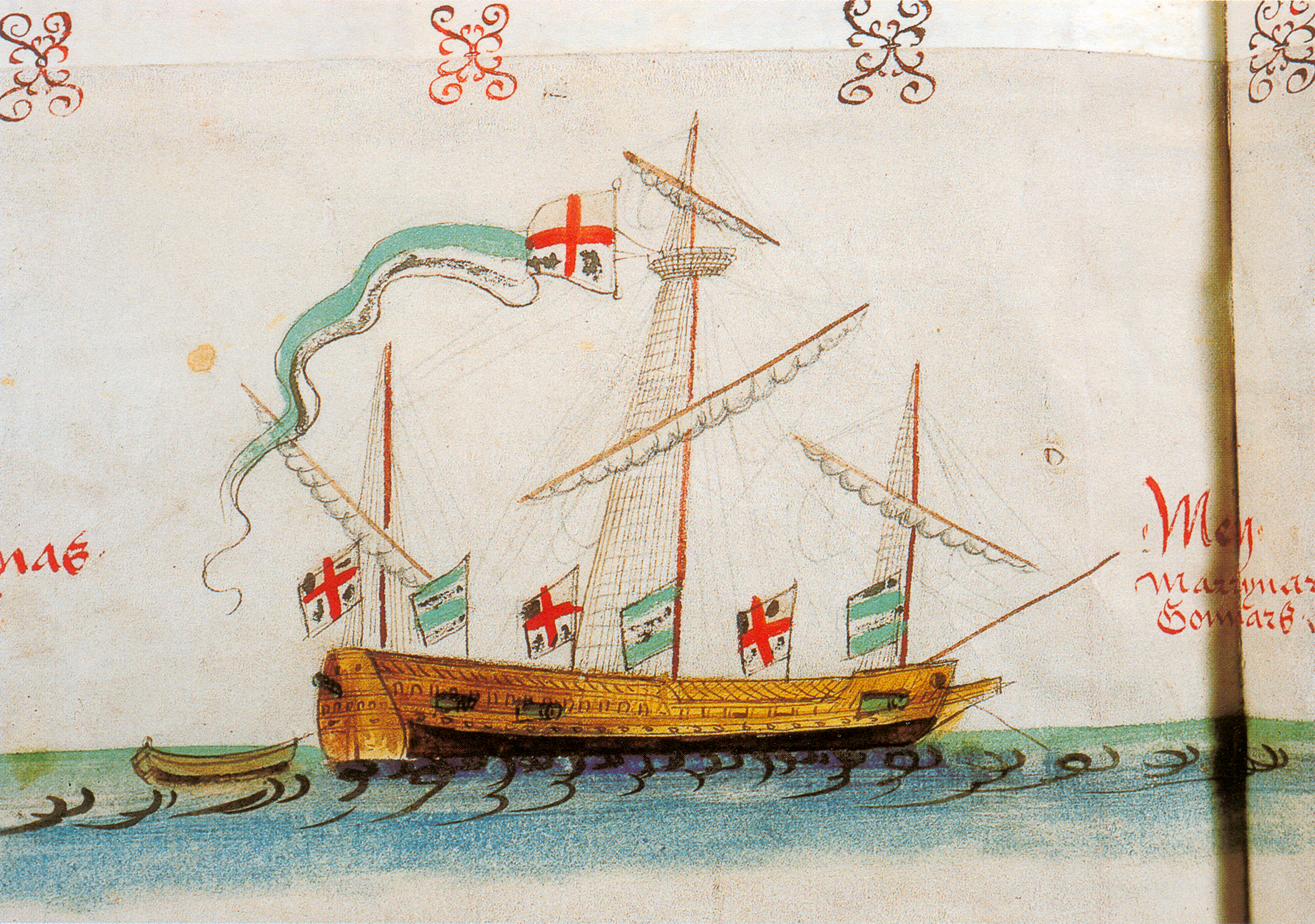
The pinnace Less Pinnace

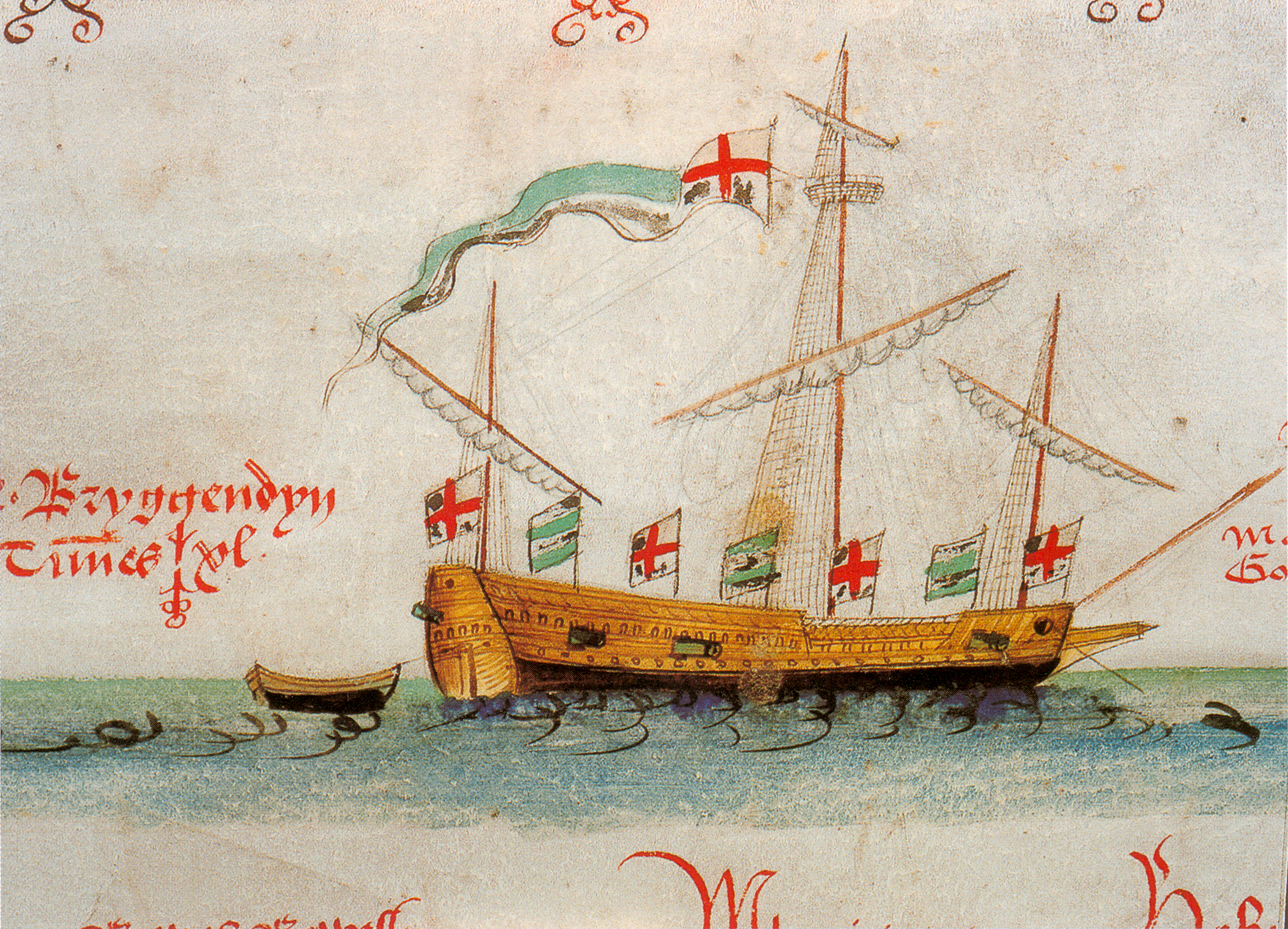
The pinnace Brigandine

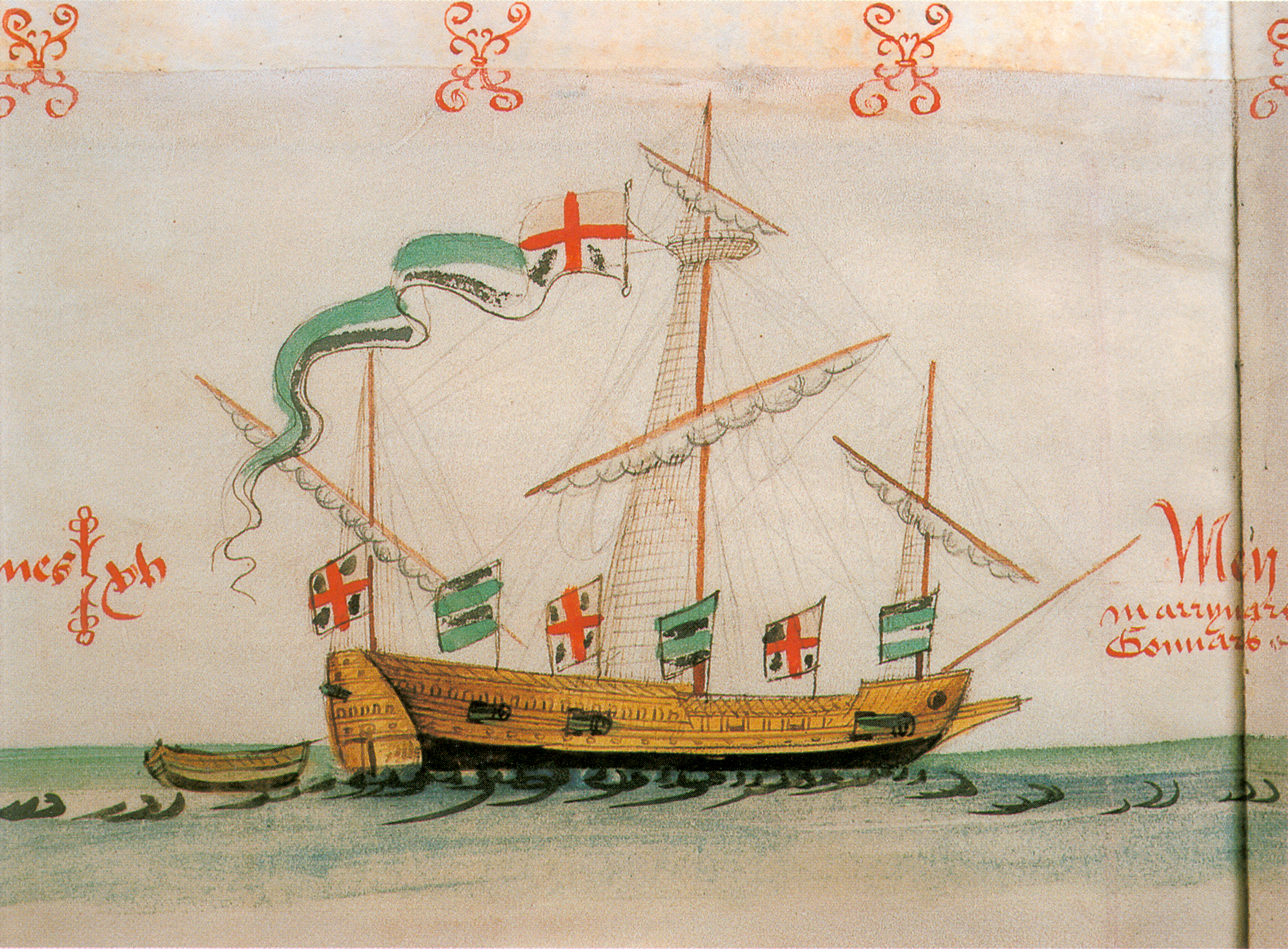
The pinnace Hare

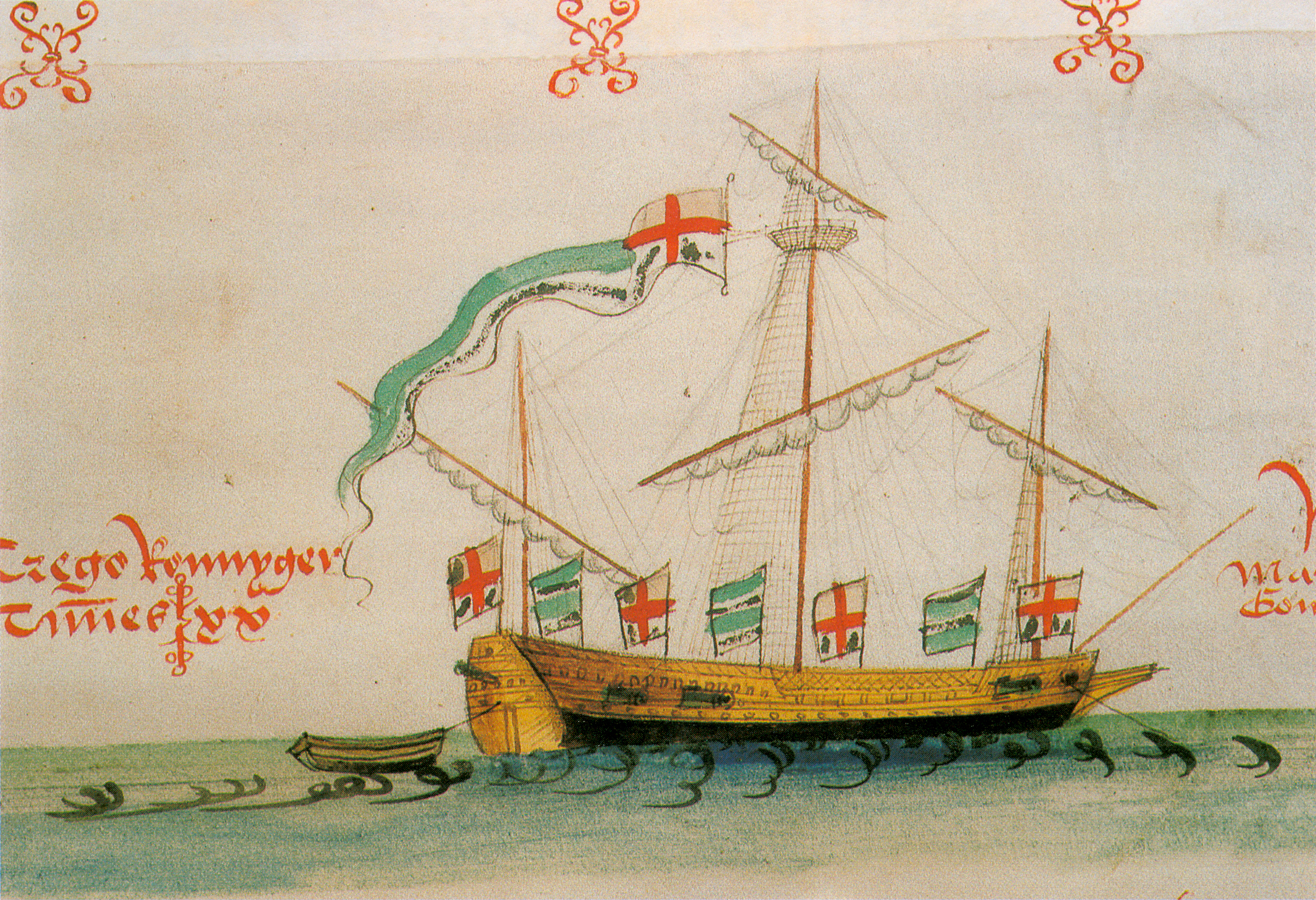
The pinnace Trego Renneger

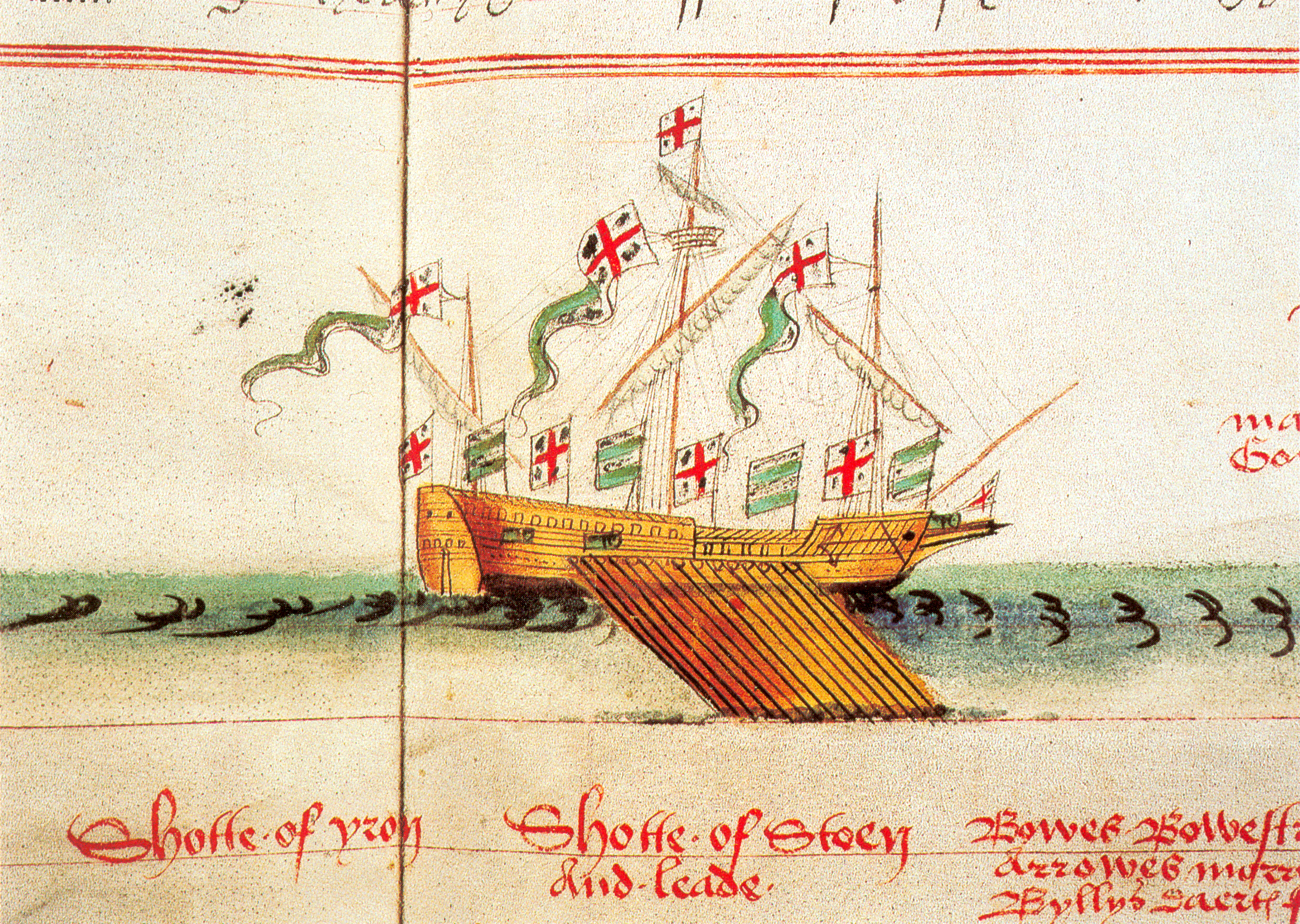
The rowbarge Double Rose

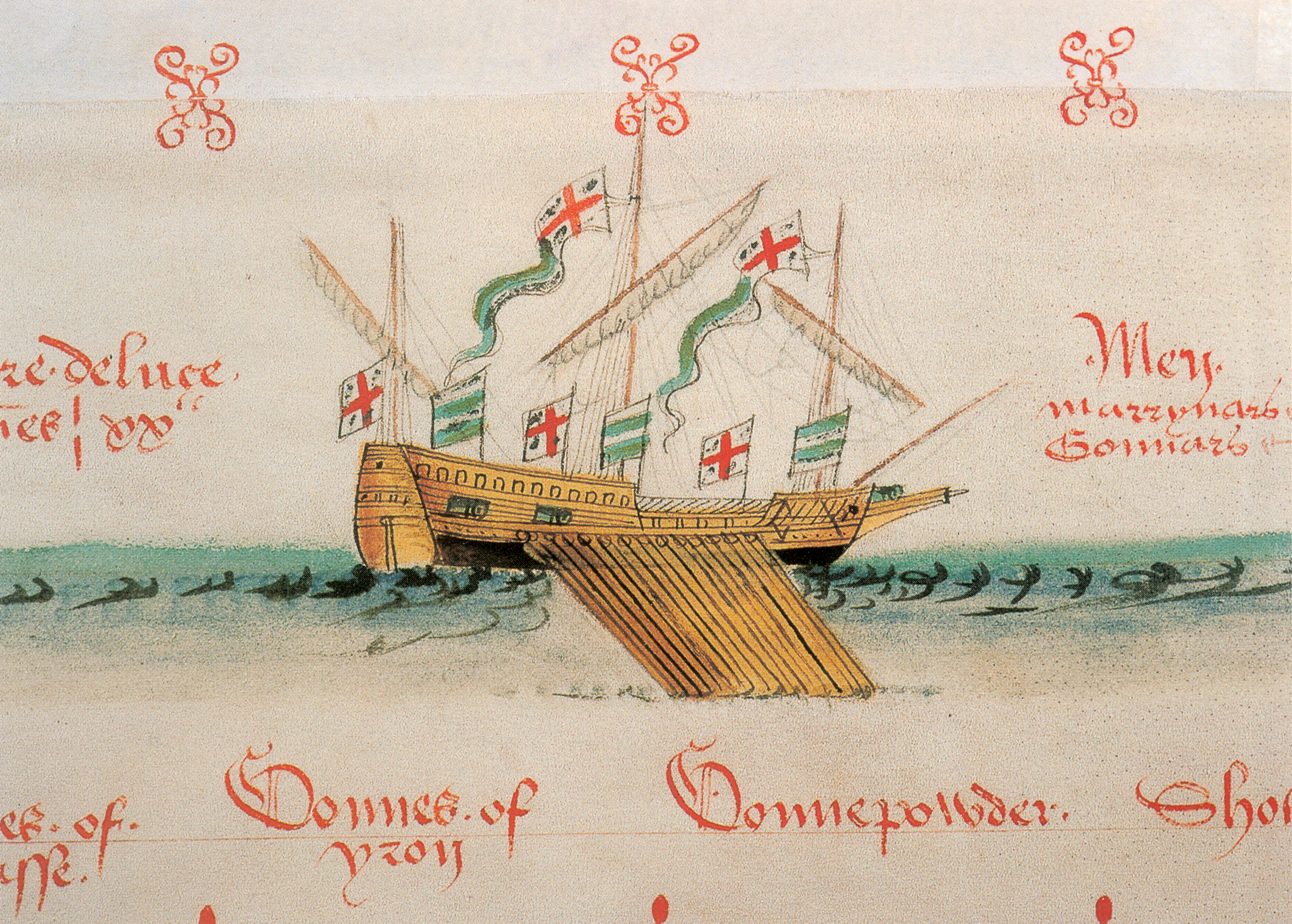
The rowbarge Flower de Luce

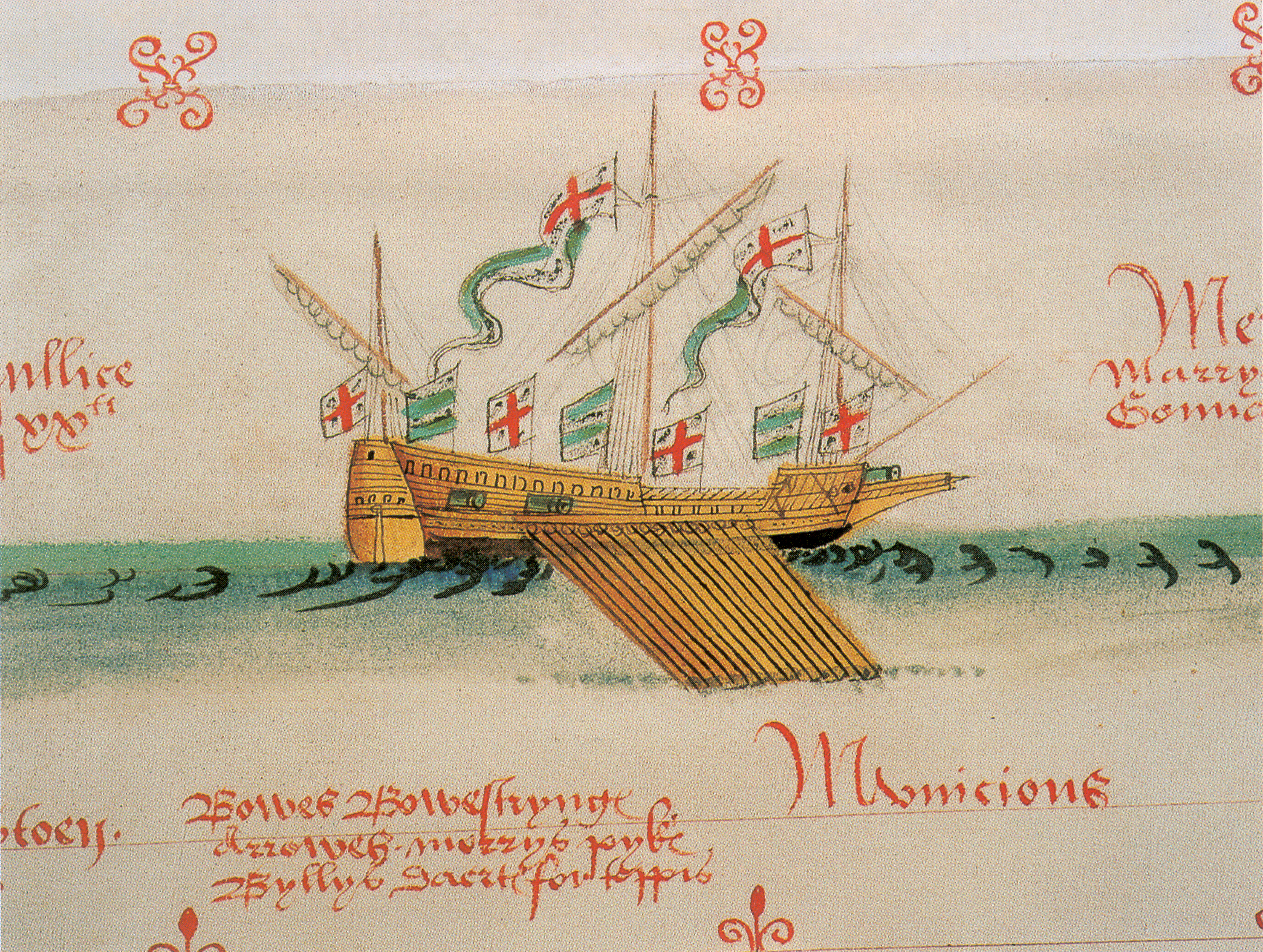
The rowbarge Portcullis

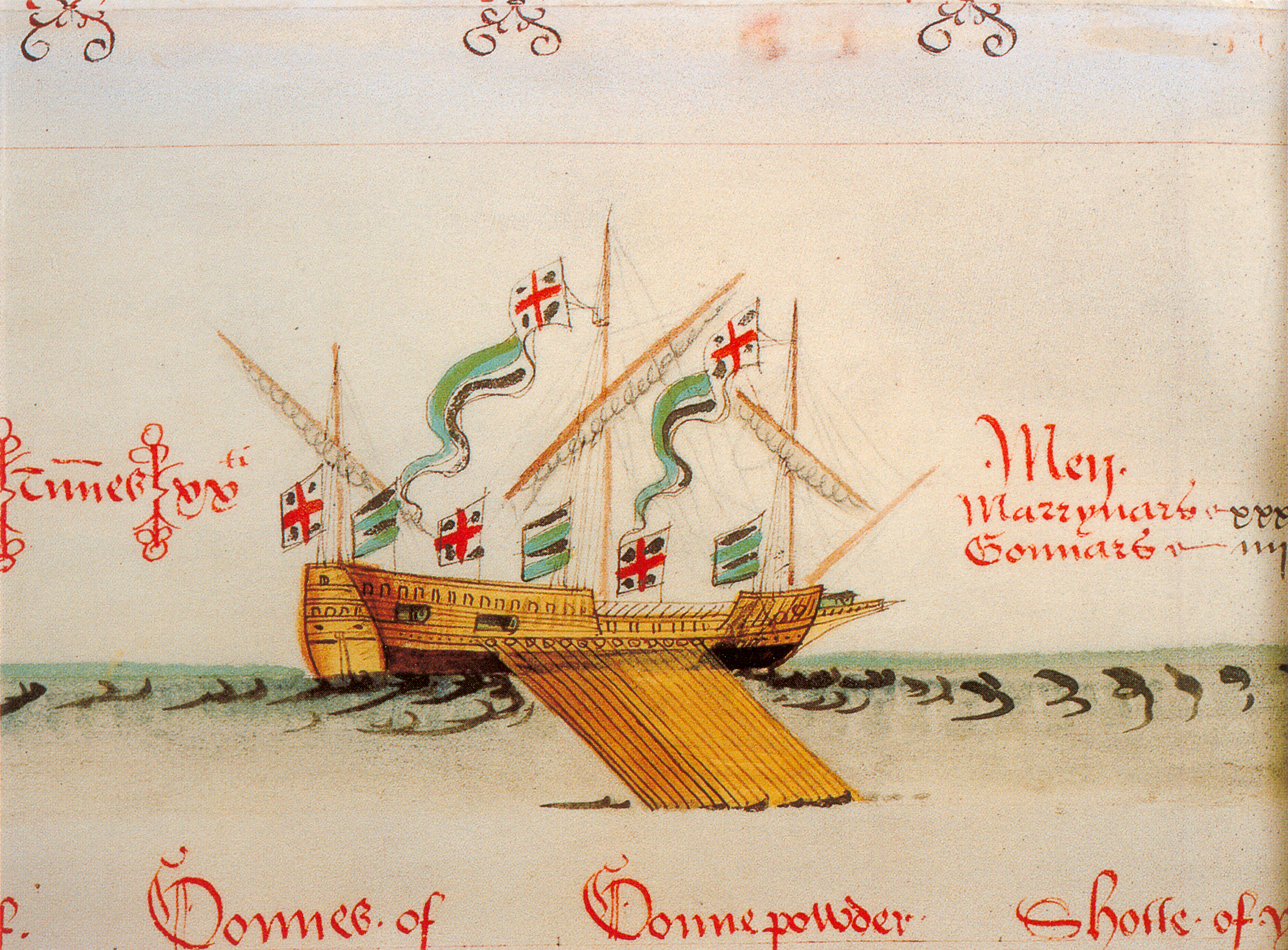
The rowbarge harp

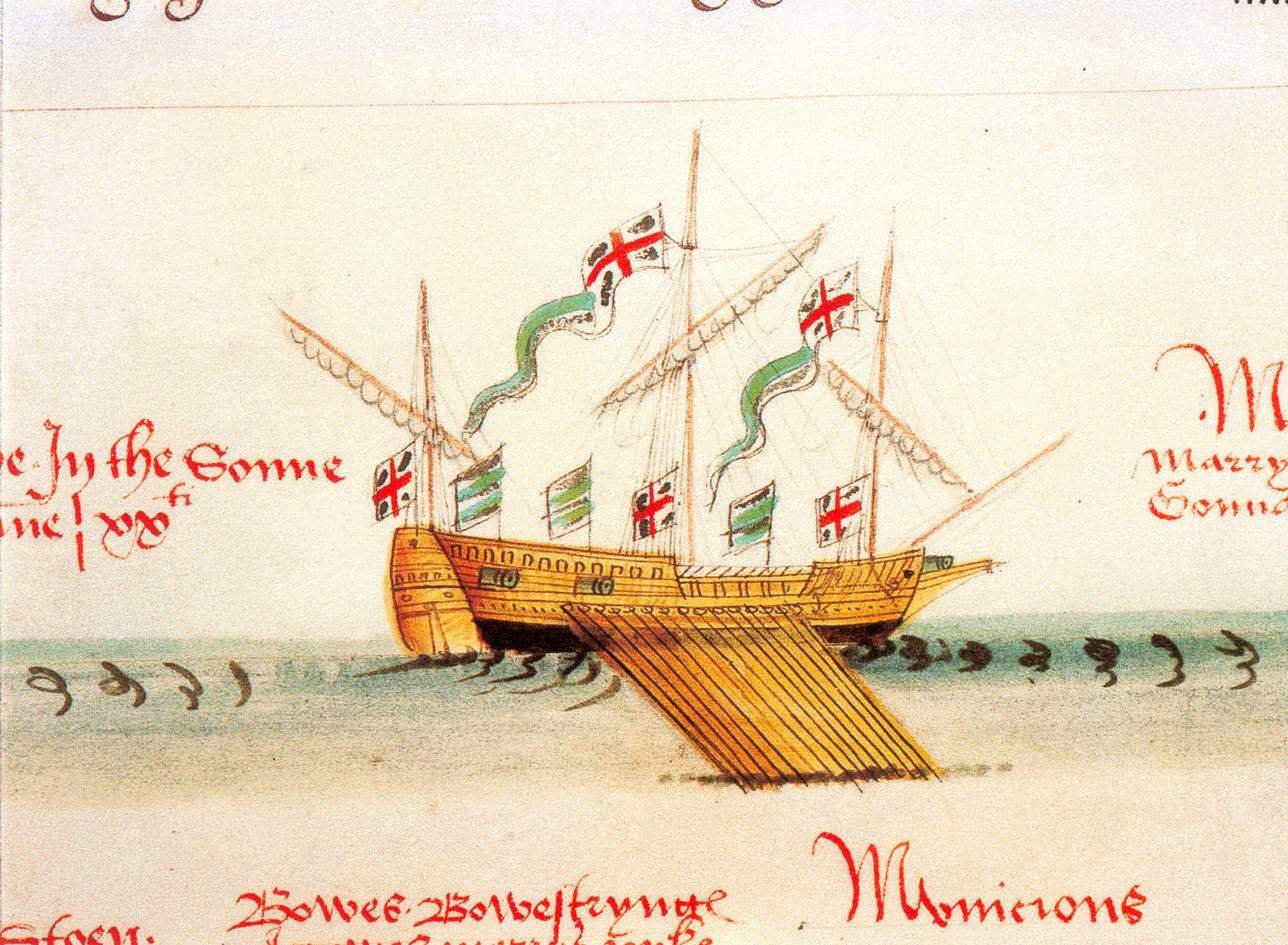
The rowbarge Cloud in the Sun

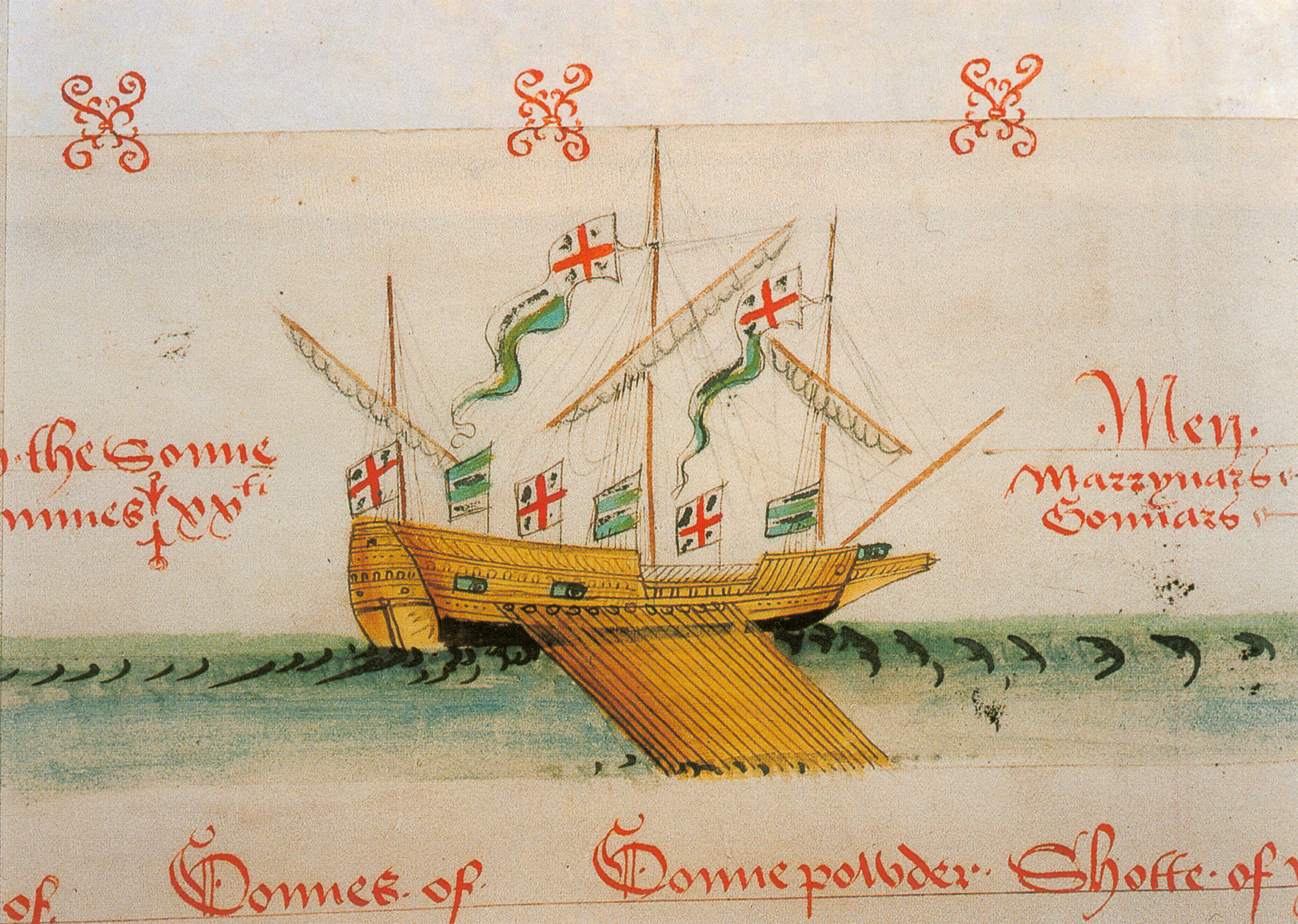
The rowbarge Rose in the Sun

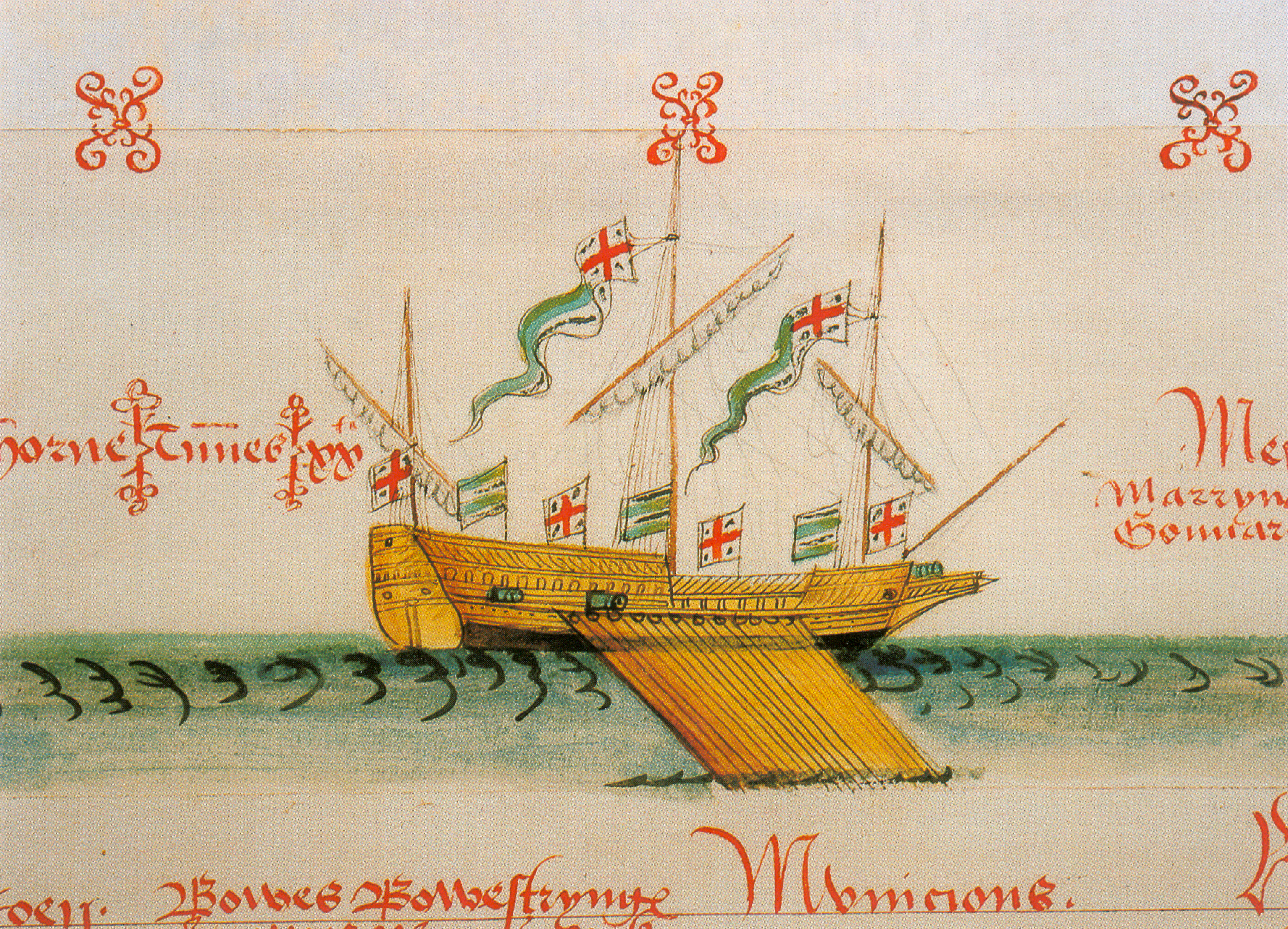
The rowbarge Hawthorn

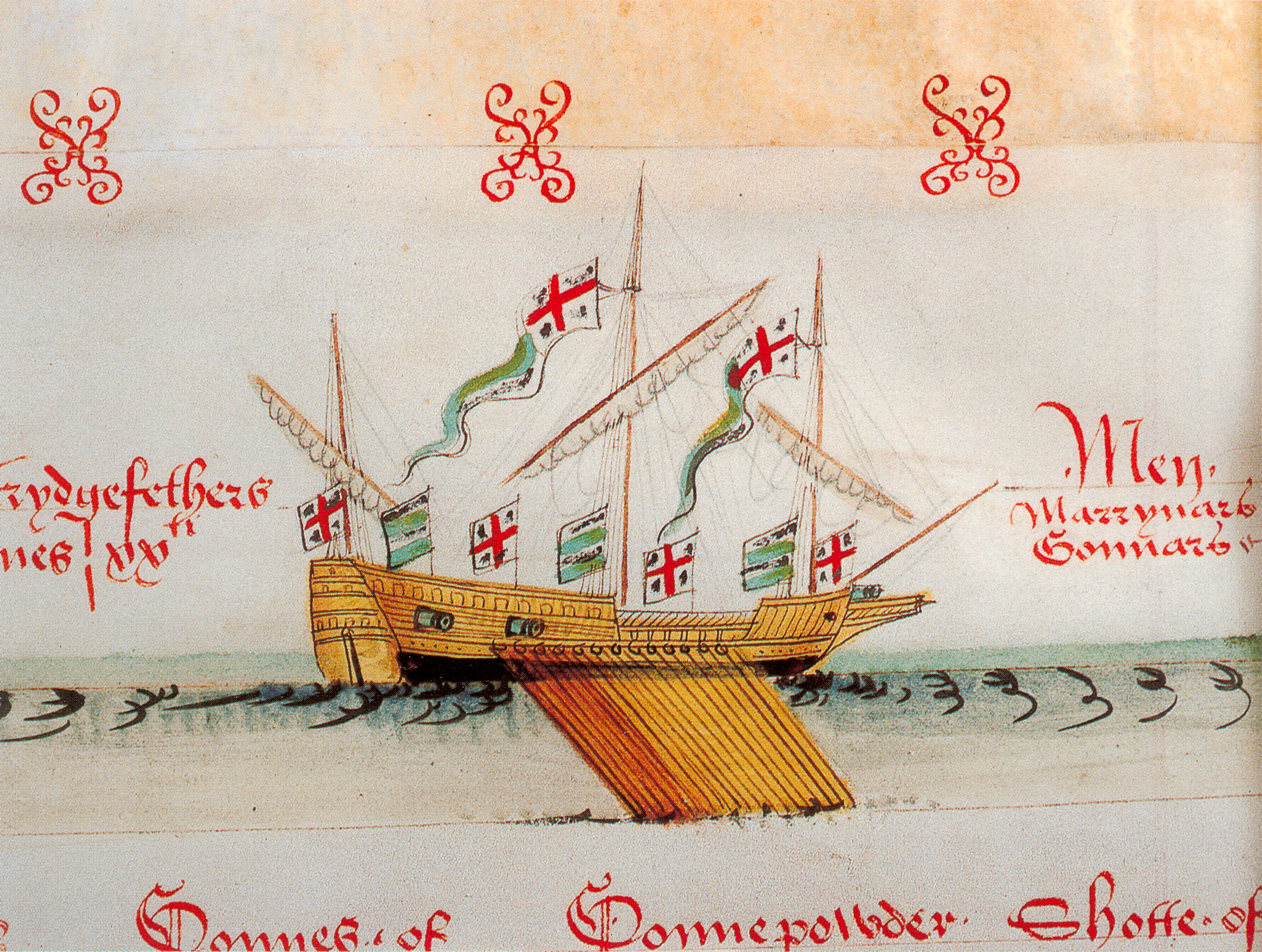
The rowbarge Three Ostrich Feathers

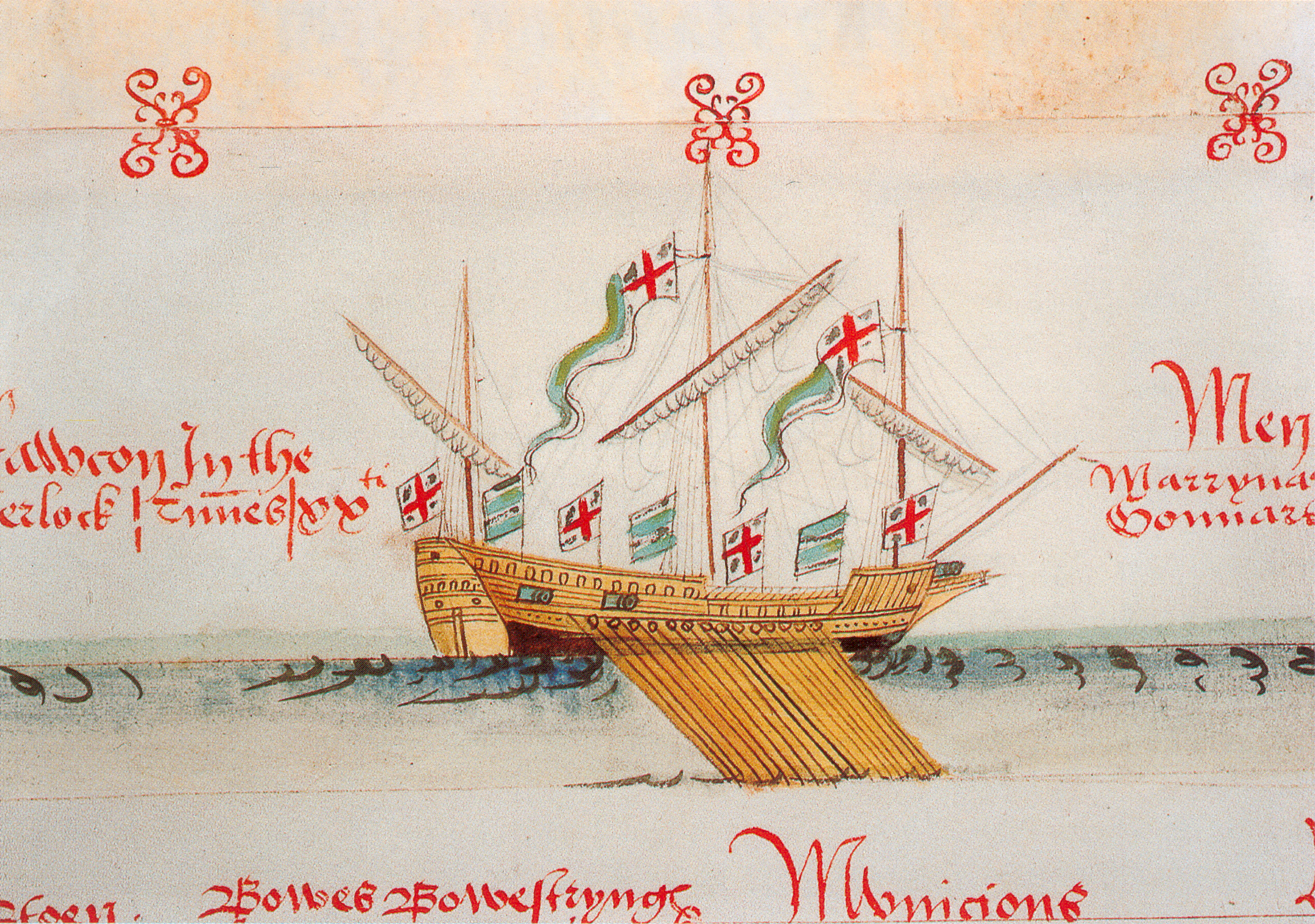
The rowbarge Falcon in the Fetterlock

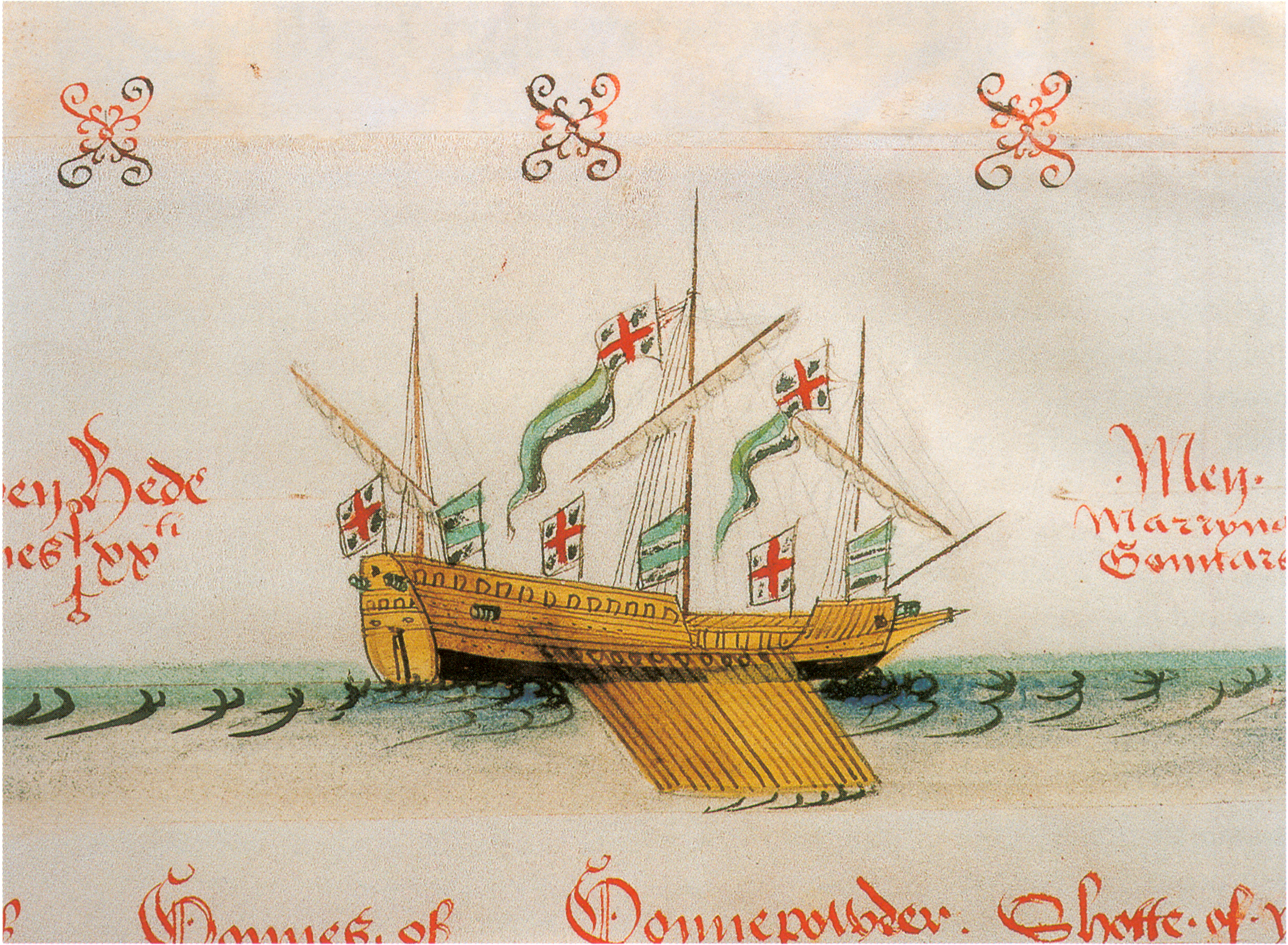
The rowbarge Maidenhead

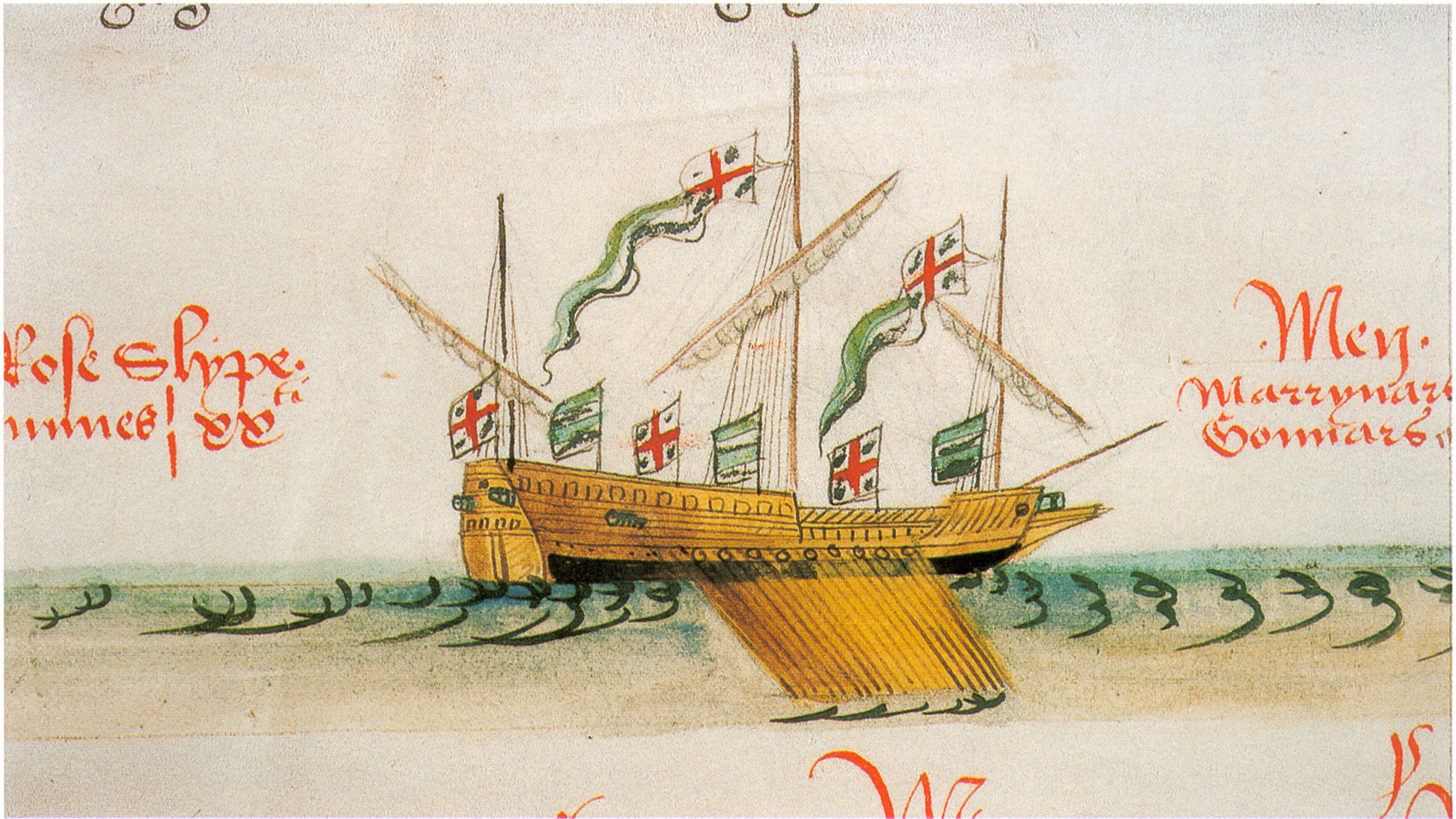
The rowbarge Rose Slip

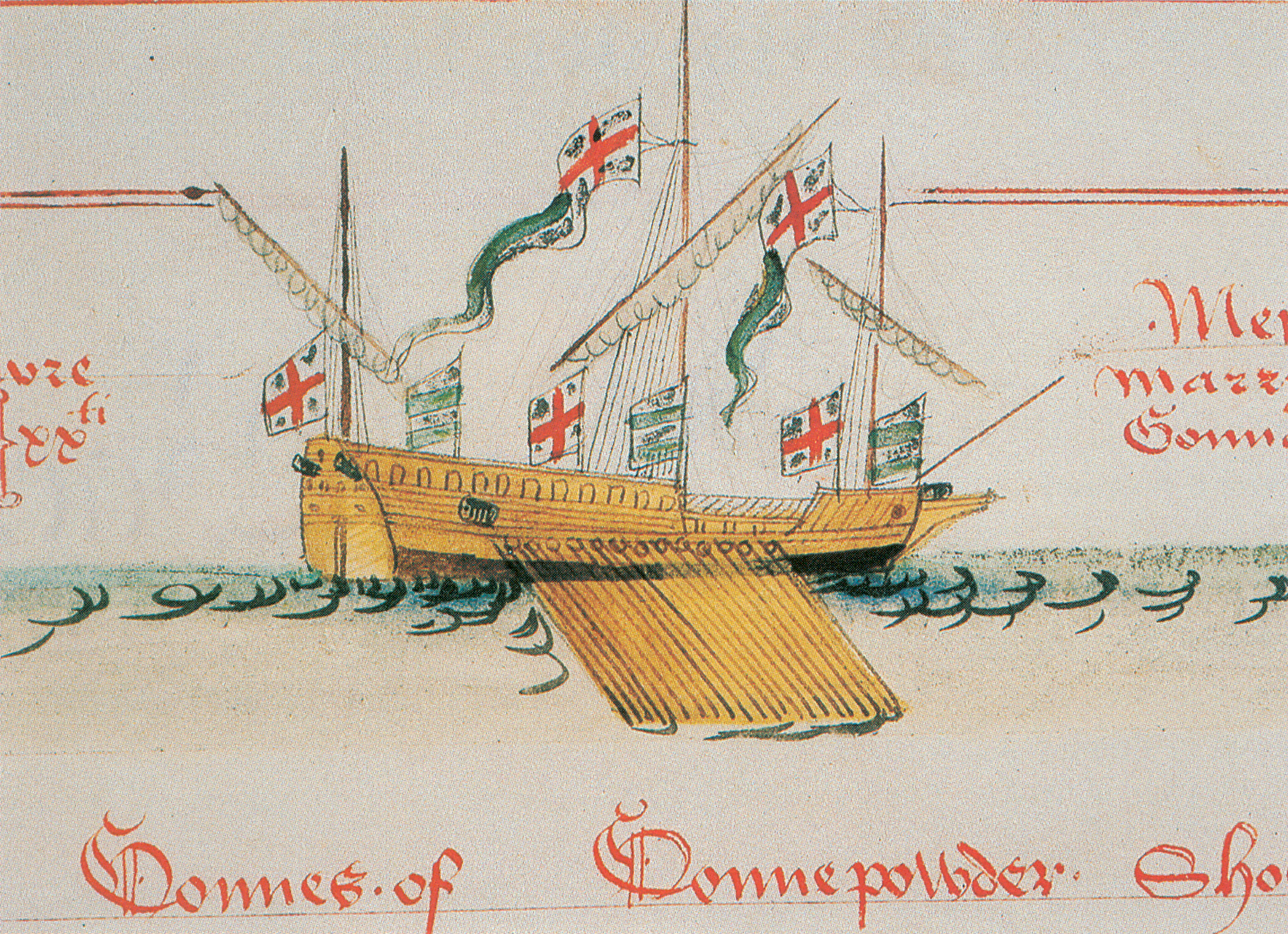
The rowbarge Gillyflower

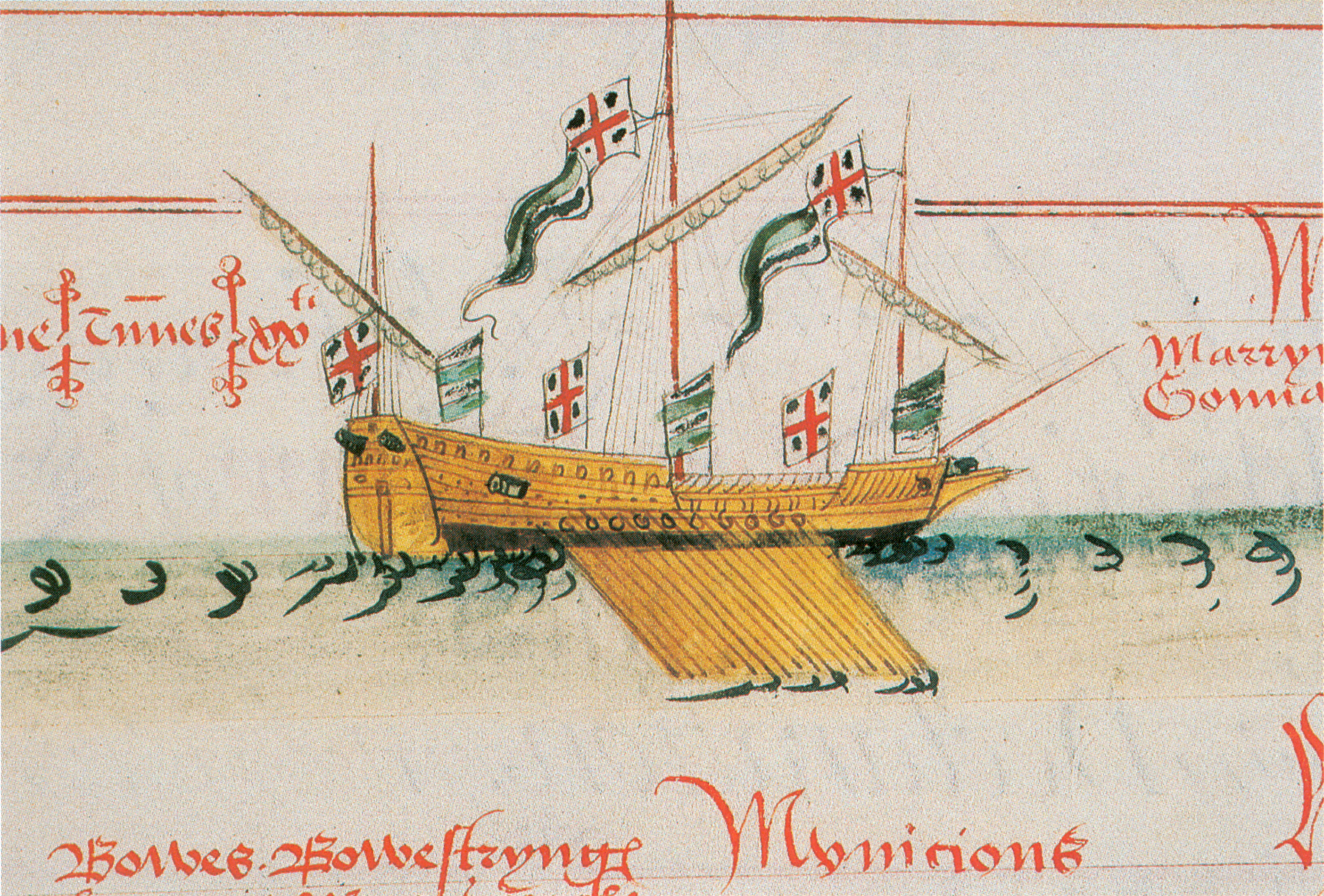
The rowbarge Sun
