= Lion (warship) =

Lion was the name of five warships of the Royal Scottish Navy during the 16th century, some of which were prizes captured by, and from the English. The names of these ships reflect the Royal Arms of Scotland and its central motif of the Lion Rampant.

== The two Lions of James IV ==
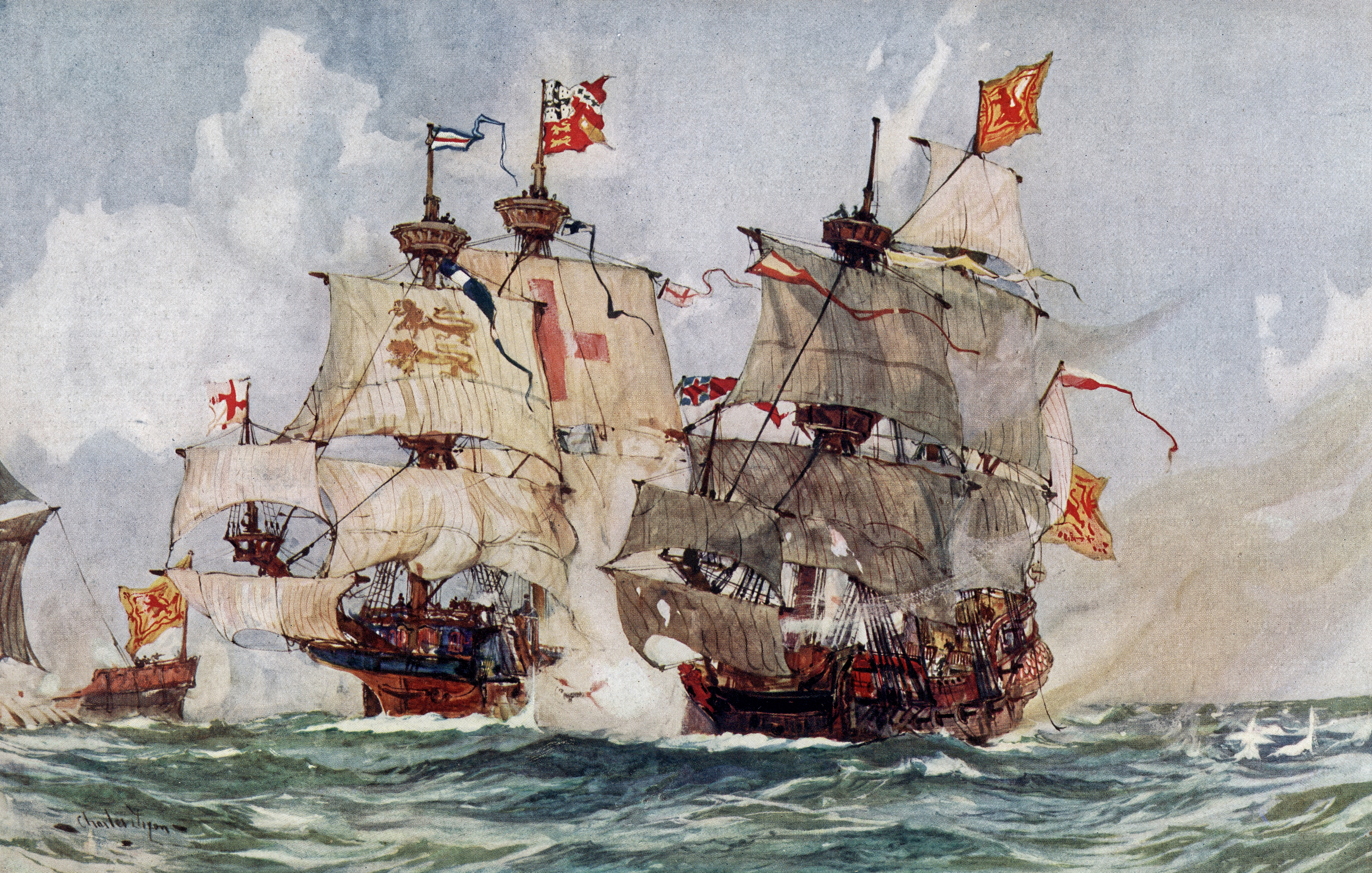
Painting of Lion being captured by the English in 1511 by Charles Dixon

Lion was commanded by brothers Sir Robert Barton and Sir Andrew Barton. The ship did not belong to the king but was fitted out for warfare by the Barton brothers. She was around 120 tons with a crew of forty, and probably the largest merchant ship used and hired by James IV of Scotland; small in comparison the king's Margaret and Great Michael.

Robert Barton took James IV of Scotland to the Isle of May and Blackness Castle with the Lion and another boat in July and September 1506. Andrew Barton took Lion and the small Jennet of Purwyn, (which was a captured Danish ship) close to England in June 1511. He was acting with a royal Letter of Marque, which was a license to plunder Portuguese ships. Both ships were captured by Sir Edward and Sir Thomas Howard and taken to Blackwall. Andrew Barton was killed during their capture.

Robert Barton provided a new larger replacement Lion of 300 tons. The new Lion was victualled at Honfleur on 24 August 1513 with supplies for 260 men. James IV had lent his ships to France in the months before Flodden.

== Lion and Lioness of James V ==
Lion, or Great Lion was commanded by Robert Barton and later by his nephew John Barton. Captured by the English off the Kent coast in March 1547. In the 1530s this ship had been captured from the English navy and passed into the hands of James V of Scotland. The Lion was part of the fleet that James V took to France in 1536 and brought back Madeleine of Valois in 1537. Known as Great Lion, she and Salamander were fitted with 15 large wheeled guns and 10 smaller wheeled guns in May 1540, for the king's voyage to Orkney in June. John Barton sailed to Dieppe with Great Lion and Salamander in June 1541, and had their 27 guns cleaned and the latter ship re-rigged. In December 1542, Mary Willoughby, Salamander and Lion blockaded the London merchant ship Antony of Bruges in a creek on the coast of Brittany near 'Poldavy Haven.'

In March and April 1544, Lion was prepared for a voyage to France with ambassadors. David Lindsay of the Mount, David Paniter, Sir John Campbell of Lundy, and Marco Grimani, Patriarch of Aquileia were rumoured to be passengers. Hertford noted this was a prize not to be missed, and the Master of Morton wrote to him pointing out the opportunity to capture friend and foe, including his own father. She sailed on 7 April 1544, evading capture. The Mary Willoughby, Lyon, Andrew, and three French-built ships menaced the quay of Bridlington on 19 September 1544.

In October 1546, Florence Corntoun spent £305 repairing the Lion. Captain William Forstar was compensated with £540 for his expenses during 1544 fighting the war of Rough Wooing; £483 for repairs in March 1545; £708 for a voyage to the isles in June 1545; and £346 for recent works in dry-dock described as;

to Williame Forstar quhilk he debursit upoun the calfating, dok casting, putting in of the under lute of the said Lyoun, and outred of hir to the Raid (attack)."

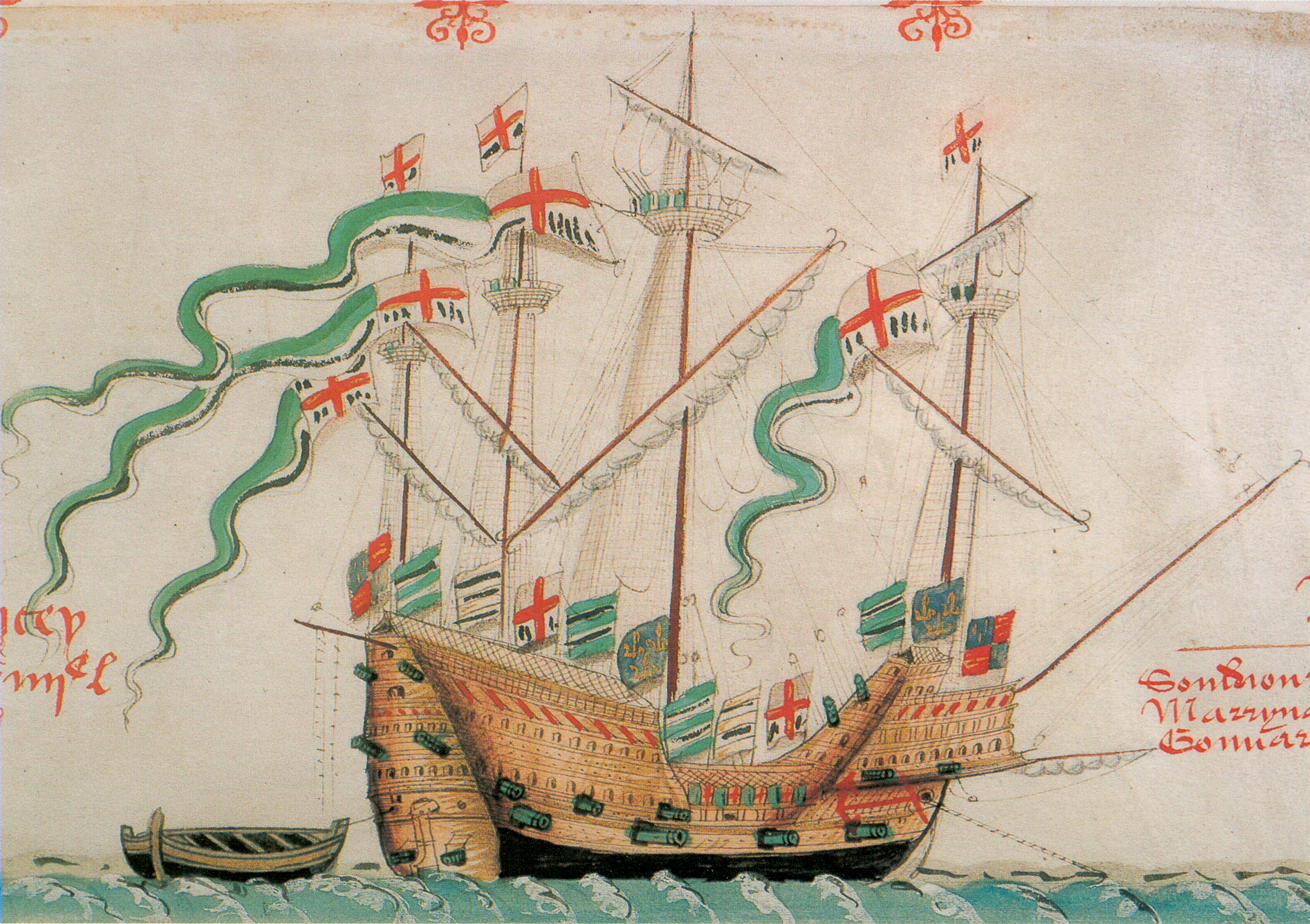
The English carrack Pansy captured the Lion in 1547, illustration from the Anthony Roll

From October 1546, with other Scottish warships she was disrupting the English wine trade by blockading Bordeaux and La Rochelle. In March 1547, she took a broadside from Andrew Dudley's Pansy off Dover which burst her orlop. She was lost off Harwich or Yarmouth during the salvage operation. Odet de Selve, the French ambassador in London gained a detailed account from Nicolas d'Arfeville, a French painter and cartographer. Dudley was 30 miles from Yarmouth when he saw Great Lion, with Lioness, Mary Gallant and another unnamed Scottish ship on Tuesday 7 March 1547. Great Lion was overwhelmed by superior firepower, and the others surrendered, excepting the unnamed ship. The badly damaged Lion was lost while being towed to Yarmouth when she grounded on a sandbank. Those on board were brought as prisoners to the Tower of London, and at least one notable passenger was killed in the firefight. Mary, Queen of Scots sued for the release of one passenger, the diplomat Thomas Erskine Commendator of Dryburgh.

Lioness; during the Scottish lifetime of Great Lion there appears to have been another ship called Lion in the Scots navy. This was probably Lioness, described by de Selve as of similar size to Mary Gallant, between 100 and 300 tons.

== The private Lion of Leith and privateer ==
Mary of Guise also hired a private ship, called Lion in August 1554 to attack Borve Castle, Sutherland held by Iye Du Mackay. Hugh Kennedy of Girvanmains embarked 50 men of war and the royal gunner Hans Cochrane with a cannon. On New Year's Day 1560 this Lion captured a Portuguese merchant ship carrying cloth near the Isle of Wight; and later another carrying sugar and olives; Our Lady of Consolation of Porto carrying figs; and Saint Anthony of Aviero laden with salt. The partners in this adventure and the Captain, John Edmondstone, fell out over the proceeds and brought the case to the court of the Lord High Admiral of Scotland, James Hepburn, 4th Earl of Bothwell. They produced a letter of marque dating to the time of James IV belonging to Robert Logan of Restalrig. A year later, another Captain of the Lion, Patrick Blackadder, came to the court on 13 May 1561, this time for two Portuguese ships carrying sugar, Peter and Holy Spirit, captured in the Wash in April 1561. Blackadder produced the captured Portuguese sailors and the original letter of marque given to Andrew Barton on 20 November 1506. Robert Barton's descendant John Moubray of Barnebougall made a counterclaim for ownership of the letter and a share of the spoil.

=== The Lion and the Unicorn ===
In February 1567, Lion of Leith and Unicorn of Leith were at the Port of London, and were licensed by Elizabeth I of England to carry bows and arrows and pewter vessels to Scotland for the Earl of Murray. This Lion was taken in 1567 by William Kirkcaldy of Grange in pursuit of the Earl of Bothwell to Shetland where he ran aground north of Bressay Sound. Both the Lion and the Unicorn (which belonged to Andrew Lamb) ran aground during the pursuit and were wrecked.
