= Henry Grace à Dieu =

16th century carrack of English construction

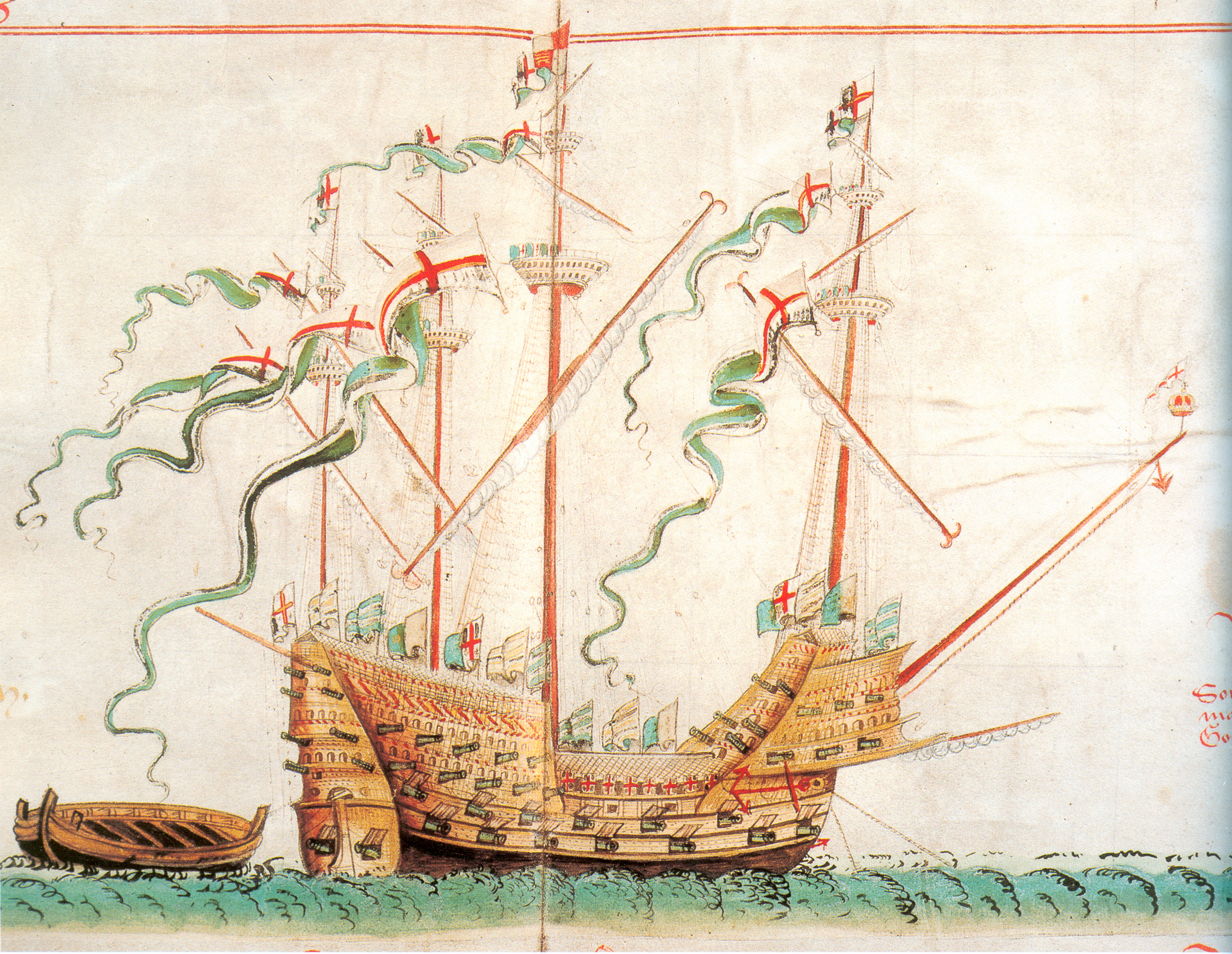
- Henry Grace à Dieu as depicted in the Anthony Roll

History

EnglandEngland
- Name: Henry Grace à Dieu (from 1547 Edward)
- Namesake: Henry VIII; Edward VI
- Builder: Woolwich Dockyard
- Launched: 13 June 1514
- Commissioned: 1514
- Refit: Rebuilt circa 1536
- Honours and awards: Battle of the Solent
- Fate: Accidentally destroyed by fire at Woolwich on 25 August 1553

General characteristics
- Class & type: Carrack
- Tons burthen: 1000
- Length: 165 ft (50.29 m)
- Complement: 700
- Armament: 43 cannons, 141 swivel guns

Henry Grace à Dieu ('Henry, Thanks be to God'), also known as Great Harry, was an English carrack or "great ship" of the King's Fleet in the 16th century, and in her day the largest warship in the world. Contemporary with Mary Rose, Henry Grace à Dieu was even larger, and served as Henry VIII's flagship.

Built by William Bond (master shipwright) under the direction of Robert Brygandine (clerk of the ships), she had a large forecastle four decks high, and a stern castle two decks high. She was 165 feet (50.29 m) long, measuring 1,000 tons burthen (Note: "... and was probably of 1,000 tons, although some contemporary accounts give the figure of 1,500.") and having a complement of 700 men. She was ordered by Henry VIII, probably to replace Grace Dieu (later renamed Regent), which had been destroyed at the Battle of Saint-Mathieu in August 1512.

At a time of naval rivalry with the Kingdom of Scotland, her size was in response to the Scottish ship Great Michael, which had herself been the largest warship when launched in 1511. She was surpassed herself by the 2000-ton Grande Françoise built by King Francis I of France in 1520, but this ship turned out too large to sail and never left port.

== History ==
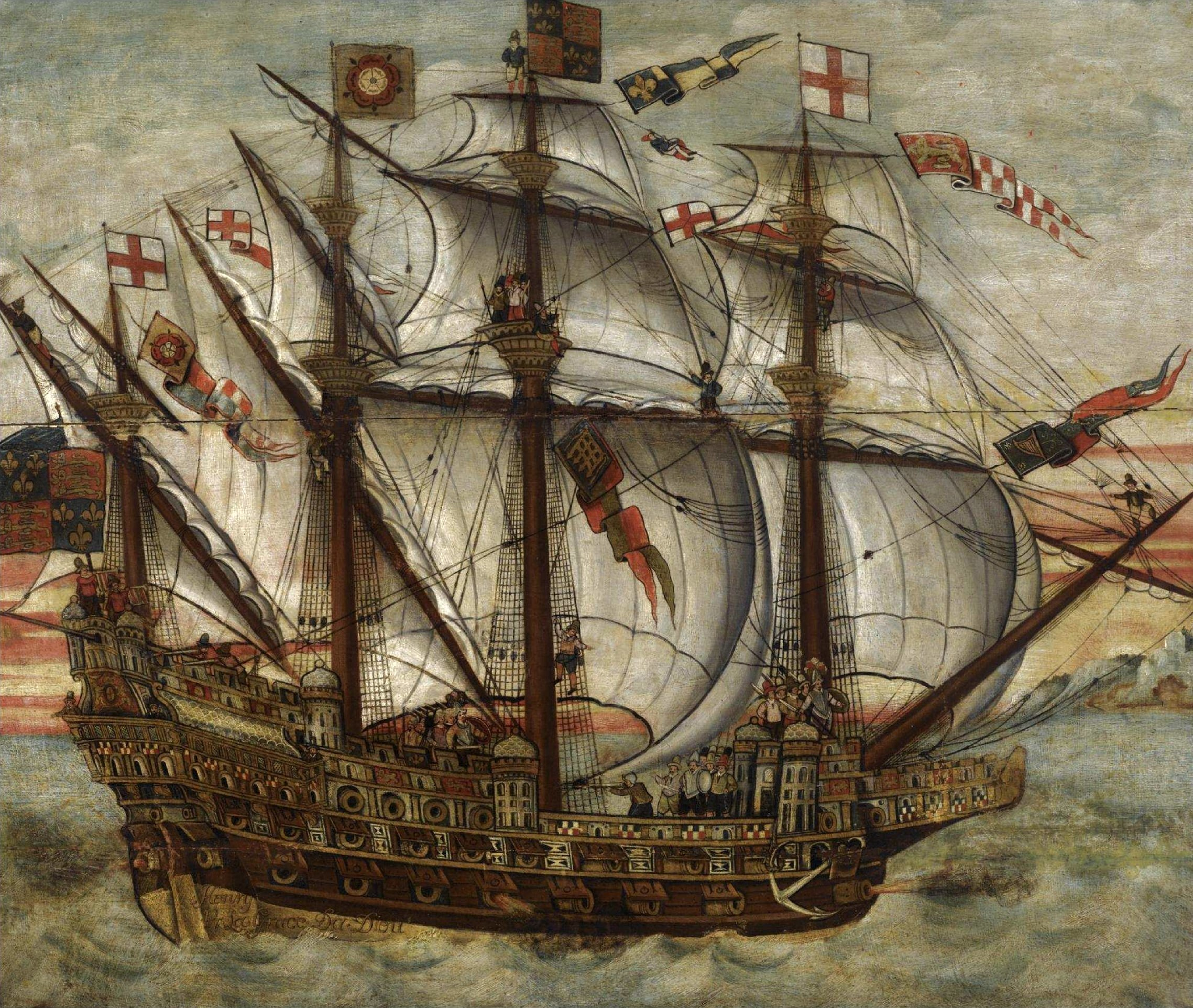
c. 1575 illustration of Henri Grâce à Dieu

The ship was built from 1512 to 1514 at the purpose-built Gun Wharf in Old Woolwich. This wharf became the origin of Woolwich Dockyard, although in the 1540s the dockyard moved further west to an area known as "The King's Yard", where it would remain for more than 300 years. Henry Grace à Dieu was one of the first vessels to feature gunports and had twenty of the new heavy bronze cannon, allowing for a broadside. She was fitted out later in the Naval Dockyard in Erith. In all she mounted 43 heavy guns and 141 light guns.

Very early on it became apparent that the ship was top heavy. She was plagued with heavy rolling in rough seas and her poor stability adversely affected gun accuracy and general performance as a fighting platform. To correct this, she underwent a substantial remodelling in Erith in 1539 (three years after the Mary Rose), during which the height of the hull was reduced. In this new form she was 1000 tons burthen and carried 151 guns of varying size, including 21 of bronze (comprising 4 cannon, 3 demi-cannon, 4 culverins, 2 demi-culverins, 4 sakers, 2 cannon perriers and 2 falcons), her full crew was reduced to between 700 and 800. (Note: The Anthony Roll gives this as 349 soldiers, 301 mariners and 7 gunners.) She was given an improved and innovative sailing arrangement with four masts, each divided into three sections; the forward two square rigged with mainsail, topsail and topgallants; and the aft two carrying five lateen sails between them. This allowed for easier handling of the sails and spread wind forces more evenly on the ship, resulting in better speed and maneuverability, and allowing better use of the heavy broadside. The only surviving contemporary depiction of the craft is from the Anthony Roll.

The Henry Grace à Dieu saw little action. She was present at the Battle of the Solent against French forces in 1545, in which Mary Rose sank. Overall, she was used more as a diplomatic vessel, including taking Henry VIII to the summit with Francis I of France at the Field of the Cloth of Gold in 1520 (although smaller ships had to be used to take the King out of the harbours at Dover and Calais, as neither was deep enough to permit vessels of this draught to operate).

After the accession of Edward VI in 1547, she was renamed Edward for him. She was accidentally destroyed at Woolwich by fire on 25 August 1553, 50 days after the death of Edward VI (and accession of Mary I) on 6 July 1553.

== See also ==
- Henry V's Grace Dieu (1418)
- Portuguese galleon São João Baptista

== Sources ==
- Clowes, William Laird (1897). The Royal Navy, a History from the Earliest Times to Present: Volume I. London: Sampson, Low, Marston and Company.
- Dear, I. C. B.; Kemp, Peter, eds. (2007). "Henry Grâce à Dieu". The Oxford Companion to Ships and the Sea (2 ed.). Oxford University Press. ISBN 978-0191727504.
- Goodwin, George (2013). Fatal Rivalry: Flodden 1513. Phoenix (Orion Books Ltd). ISBN 978-1780221366.
- Lincoln P. Paine (1997) Ships of the World: An Historical Encyclopedia Houghton Mifflin ISBN 0-85177-739-2
- Potter, David (2011). Henry VIII and Francis I: The Final Conflict, 1540-1547. Brill. ISBN 9789004204317.
