= Royal Scots Navy =

Royal Scots Navy Royal Scots Navy (RSN)
- Cabhlach Rìoghail na h-Alba
- Royal Arms of Scotland (1603–1707)
- Active: Middle Ages – 1707
- Disbanded: 1 May 1707
- Country: Scotland
- Allegiance: Monarch of Scotland
- Type: Navy
- Role: Coastal defence
- Part of: Scottish Military
- Mottos: In My Defens God Me Defend ("In My Defence God Me Defend")
- Colours: Blue, White, & Red
- Engagements: See list: Anglo-Scottish Wars; Anglo-Dutch War (1652–54); War of the Spanish Succession

Commanders
- Lord High Admiral: David Wemyss (last)

Insignia
- Civil Ensign

The Royal Scots Navy (or Old Scots Navy) was the navy of the Kingdom of Scotland from its origins in the Middle Ages until its merger with the Kingdom of England's Royal Navy per the Acts of Union 1707. There are mentions in Medieval records of fleets commanded by Scottish kings in the twelfth and thirteenth centuries. King Robert I (1274–1329, r. 1306–1329) developed naval power to counter the English in the Wars of Independence (1296–1328). The build-up of naval capacity continued after the establishment of Scottish independence. In the late fourteenth century, naval warfare with England was conducted largely by hired Scots, Flemish and French merchantmen and privateers. King James I (1394–1437, r. 1406–1437) took a greater interest in naval power, establishing a shipbuilding yard at Leith and probably creating the office of Lord High Admiral.

King James IV (1473–1513, r. 1488–1513) put the enterprise on a new footing, founding a harbour at Newhaven, near Edinburgh, and a dockyard at the Pools of Airth. He acquired a total of 38 ships including Great Michael, at that time, the largest ship in Europe. Scottish ships had some success against privateers, accompanied the king on his expeditions in the islands and intervened in conflicts in Scandinavia and the Baltic Sea, but were sold after the Flodden campaign. Thereafter Scottish naval efforts would rely on privateering captains and hired merchantmen. Despite truces between England and Scotland, there were periodic outbreaks of a guerre de course. James V built a new harbour at Burntisland in 1542. The chief use of naval power in his reign was a series of expeditions to the Isles and France.

The Union of Crowns in 1603 ended Scottish conflict with England, but Scotland's involvement in England's foreign policy opened up Scottish merchantmen to attack from privateers. In 1626, a squadron of three ships were bought and equipped for protection and there were several marque fleets of privateers. In 1627, the Royal Scots Navy and privateers participated in the Siege of Saint-Martin-de-Re with a major expedition to the Bay of Biscay. The Scots also returned to the West Indies and in 1629 took part in the capture of Quebec. After the Bishop's Wars and the alliance with Parliament in the English Civil War, a "Scotch Guard" was established on the coast of Scotland of largely English ships, but with Scottish revenues and men, gradually becoming a more Scottish force. The Scottish naval forces were defeated by Oliver Cromwell's navy and when Scotland became part of the Commonwealth in 1653, they were absorbed into the Commonwealth navy. After the Restoration Scottish seamen received protection against arbitrary impressment, but a fixed quota of conscripts for the English Royal Navy was levied from the sea-coast burghs. Royal Navy patrols started to extend their routes into Scottish waters, and in the Second (1665–1667) and Third Anglo-Dutch Wars (1672–1674), between 80 and 120 captains took Scottish letters of marque and privateers played a major part in the naval conflicts. In the 1690s, a small fleet of five ships was established by merchants for the Darien scheme, and a professional navy of three warships was established to protect local shipping in 1696. After the Act of Union in 1707, these vessels and their crews were transferred to the British Royal Navy.

== Origins ==
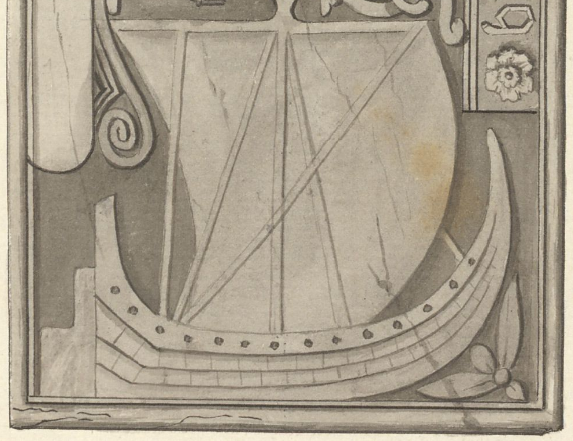
A carving of a birlinn from a sixteenth-century tombstone in MacDufie's Chapel, Oronsay, as engraved in 1772

By the late Middle Ages, the Kingdom of Scotland participated in two related maritime traditions. In the West was the tradition of galley warfare that had its origins in the Viking thalassocracies (sea-based lordships) of the Highlands and Islands and which stretched back before that to the sea power of Dál Riata that had spanned the Irish Sea. In the east, it participated in the common northern European sail-driven naval tradition. The key to the Viking success was the long-ship, a long, narrow, light, wooden boat with a shallow draft hull designed for speed. This shallow draft allowed navigation in waters only 3 feet (1 m) deep and permitted beach landings, while its light weight enabled it to be carried over portages. Longships were also double-ended, the symmetrical bow and stern allowing the ship to reverse direction quickly without having to turn around. The longship was gradually succeeded by (in ascending order of size) the birlinn, highland galley and lymphad, which, were clinker-built ships, usually with a centrally-stepped mast, but also with oars that allowed them to be rowed. Like the longship, they had a high stem and stern and were still small and light enough to be dragged across portages, but they replaced the steering board with a stern rudder from the late twelfth century. The major naval power in the Highlands and Islands was the MacDonald Lord of the Isles, who acted as largely independent kings and could raise large fleets for use even against their nominal overlord the King of Scots. They succeeded in playing off the king of Scotland against the kings of Norway and, after 1266, the king of England.

There are mentions in Medieval records of fleets commanded by Scottish kings including William the Lion and Alexander II. The latter took personal command of a large naval force which sailed from the Firth of Clyde and anchored off the island of Kerrera in 1249, intended to transport his army in a campaign against the Kingdom of the Isles, but he died before the campaign could begin. Viking naval power was disrupted by conflicts between the Scandinavian kingdoms, but entered a period of resurgence in the thirteenth century when Norwegian kings began to build some of the largest ships seen in Northern European waters. These included King Hakon Hakonsson's Kristsúðin, built at Bergen from 1262-3, which was 260 feet (79 m) long, of 37 rooms. In 1263 Hakon responded to Alexander III's designs on the Hebrides by personally leading a major fleet of forty vessels, including Kristsúðin, to the islands, where they were swelled by local allies to as many as 200 ships. Records indicate that Alexander had several large oared ships built at Ayr, but he avoided a sea battle. Defeat on land at the Battle of Largs and winter storms forced the Norwegian fleet to return home, leaving the Scottish crown as the major power in the region and leading to the ceding of the Western Isles to Alexander in 1266.

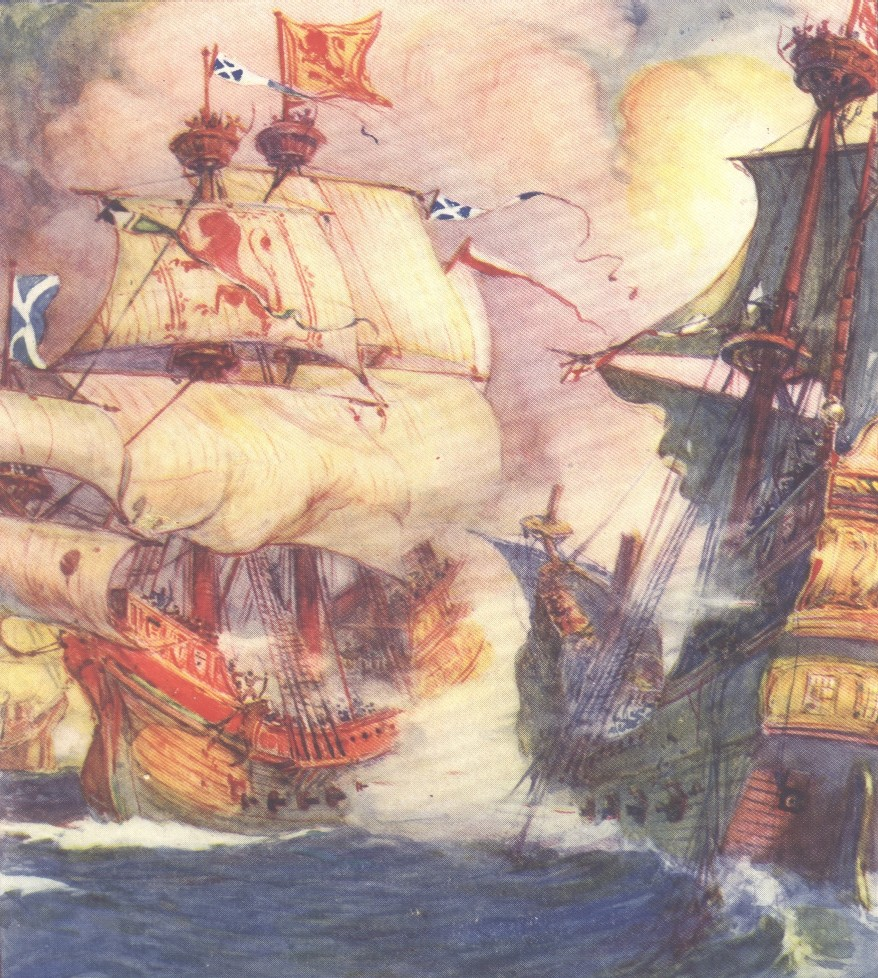
Andrew Wood's flagship, The Yellow Carvel, in action, from a children's history book (1906)

English naval power was vital to King Edward I's successful campaigns in Scotland from 1296, using largely merchant ships from England, Ireland and his allies in the Islands to transport and supply his armies. Part of the reason for Robert I's success was his ability to call on naval forces from the Islands. As a result of the expulsion of the Flemings from England in 1303, he gained the support of a major naval power in the North Sea. The development of naval power allowed Robert to successfully defeat English attempts to capture him in the Highlands and Islands and to blockade major English controlled fortresses at Perth and Stirling, the last forcing King Edward II to attempt the relief that resulted at English defeat at Bannockburn in 1314. Scottish naval forces allowed invasions of the Isle of Man in 1313 and 1317 and Ireland in 1315. They were also crucial in the siege of Berwick, which led to its fall in 1318.

After the establishment of Scottish independence, King Robert I turned his attention to building up a Scottish naval capacity. This was largely focused on the west coast, with the Exchequer Rolls of 1326 recording the feudal duties of his vassals in that region to aid him with their vessels and crews. Towards the end of his reign, he supervised the building of at least one royal man-of-war near his palace at Cardross on the River Clyde. In the late fourteenth century naval warfare with England was conducted largely by hired Scots, Flemish and French merchantmen and privateers. King James I of Scotland (1394-1437, reigned 1406–1437), took a greater interest in naval power. After his return to Scotland in 1424, he established a shipbuilding yard at Leith, a house for marine stores, and a workshop. King's ships were built and equipped there to be used for trade as well as war, one of which accompanied him on his expedition to the Islands in 1429. The office of Lord High Admiral was probably founded in this period. It would soon become a hereditary office, in the control of the Earls of Bothwell in the fifteenth and sixteenth centuries and the Earls of Lennox in the seventeenth century.

King James II (1430-1460, reigned 1437–1460) is known to have purchased a caravel by 1449. Around 1476 the Scottish merchant John Barton received letters of marque that allowed him to gain compensation for the capture of his vessels by the Portuguese by capturing ships under their colours. These letters would be repeated to his three sons John, Andrew and Robert, who would play a major part in the Scottish naval effort into the sixteenth century. In his struggles with his nobles in 1488 James III (r. 1451–88) received assistance from his two warships Flower and King's Carvel also known as Yellow Carvel, commanded by Andrew Wood of Largo. After the king's death Wood served his son James IV (r. 1488-1513), defeating an English incursion into the Forth by five English ships in 1489 and three more heavily armed English ships off the mouth of the River Tay the next year.

== Sixteenth century ==
=== James IV ===
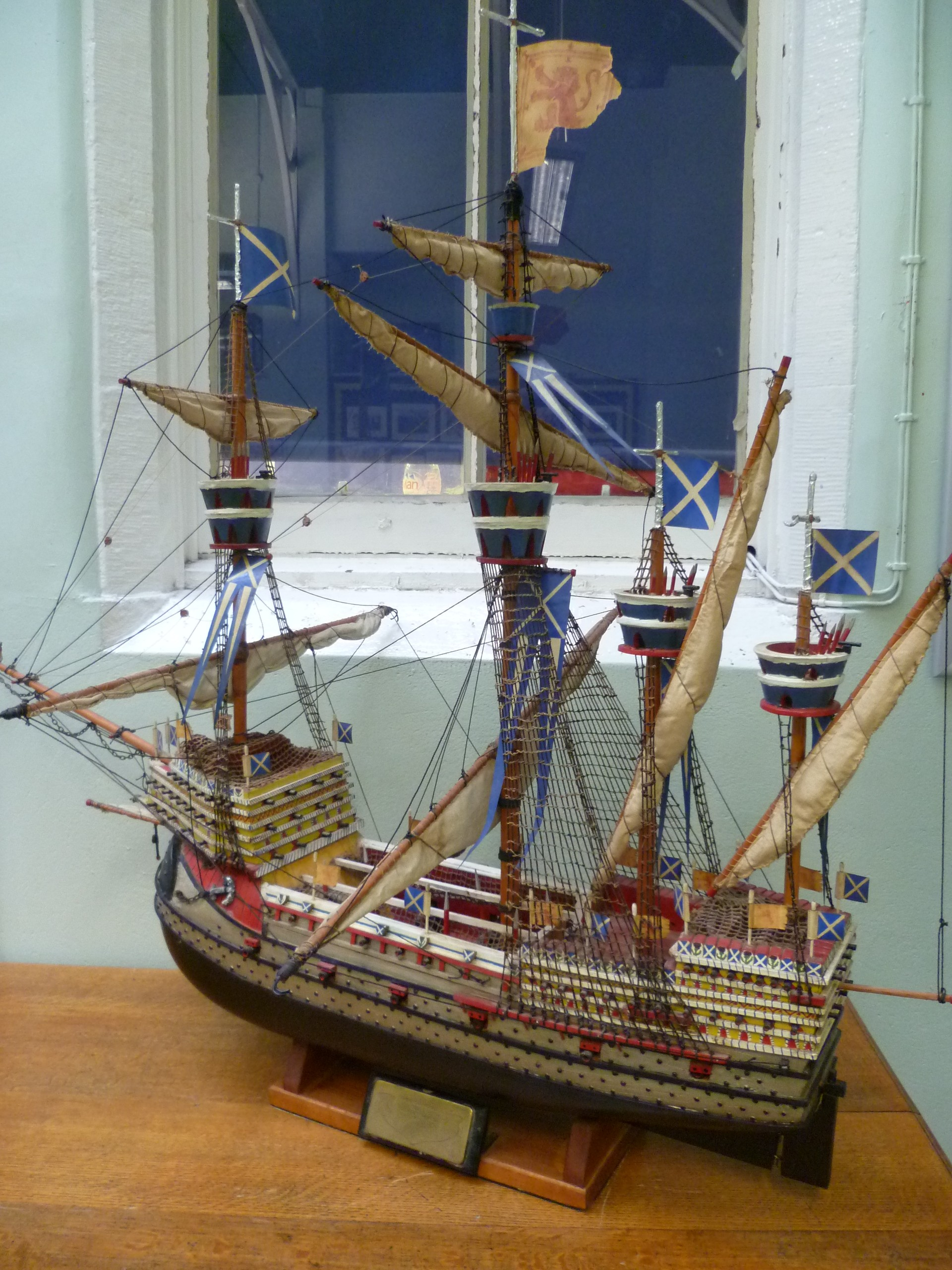
A model of the Great Michael, the largest ship in the world when launched in 1511

James IV put the naval enterprise on a new footing, founding a harbour at Newhaven in May 1504, and two years later ordered Andrew Aytoun to construct a dockyard at the Pools of Airth. The upper reaches of the Forth were protected by new fortifications on Inchgarvie. Scottish ships had some success against privateers, accompanied the king in his expeditions in the islands and intervened in conflicts in Scandinavia and the Baltic Sea. Expeditions to the Highlands to Islands to curb the power of the MacDonald Lord of the Isles were largely ineffective until in 1504 the king accompanied a squadron under Wood heavily armed with artillery, which battered the MacDonald strongholds into submission. Since some of these island fortresses could only be attacked from seaward, naval historian N. A. M. Rodger has suggested this may have marked the end of medieval naval warfare in the British Isles, ushering in a new tradition of artillery warfare.

In 1509, timber was cut in the forest of Darnaway for the king's ships. James IV acquired a total of 38 ships for the Royal Scots Navy, including Margaret, and the carrack Michael or Great Michael, the largest warship of its time (1511). The latter, built at great expense at Newhaven and launched in 1511, was 240 feet (73 m) in length, weighed 1,000 tons, had 24 cannon, and was, at that time, the largest ship in Europe. It marked a shift in design as it was designed specifically to carry a main armament of heavy artillery.

In the Flodden campaign the fleet consisted of 16 large and 10 smaller craft. After a raid on Carrickfergus in Ireland, it joined up with the French and had little impact on the war. After the disaster at Flodden the Great Michael, and perhaps other ships, were sold to the French and the king's ships disappeared from royal records after 1516. Scottish naval efforts would again rely on privateering captains and hired merchantmen during the minority of James V. In the Habsburg-Valois war of 1521–26, in which England and Scotland became involved on respective sides, the Scots had six men-of-war active attacking English and Imperial shipping and they blockaded the Humber in 1523. Although prizes were taken by Robert Barton and other captains, the naval campaign was sporadic and indecisive.

=== Privateers ===
Scots privateers and pirates preyed upon shipping in the North Sea and off the Atlantic coast of France. Scotland's Admiralty court judged whether a captured ship was a lawful prize and dealt with the recovery of goods. As the court was entitled to a tenth of the value of a prize, it was a profitable business for the admiral. The privateers Andrew and Robert Barton were still using their letters of reprisal of 1506 against the Portuguese in 1561. The Bartons operated down the east coast of Britain from Leven and the Firth of Forth, while others used the French Channel ports such as Rouen and Dieppe or the Atlantic port of Brest as bases. In 1507 Robert Barton with Lion took a Portuguese ship, but was detained by the Dutch authorities at Veere for piracy. James IV managed to engineer his release, but in 1509 John Barton with Lion took a Portuguese vessel that was carrying Portuguese and English goods. In 1511 Andrew Barton headed south with Jennet Purwyn and another ship to continue the private war, and took prizes that he claimed were Portuguese, but contained English goods. He was intercepted in the English Downs by Lord Thomas Howard and Sir Edward Howard. Barton was killed and his two ships captured and transferred to the English navy.

=== James V ===
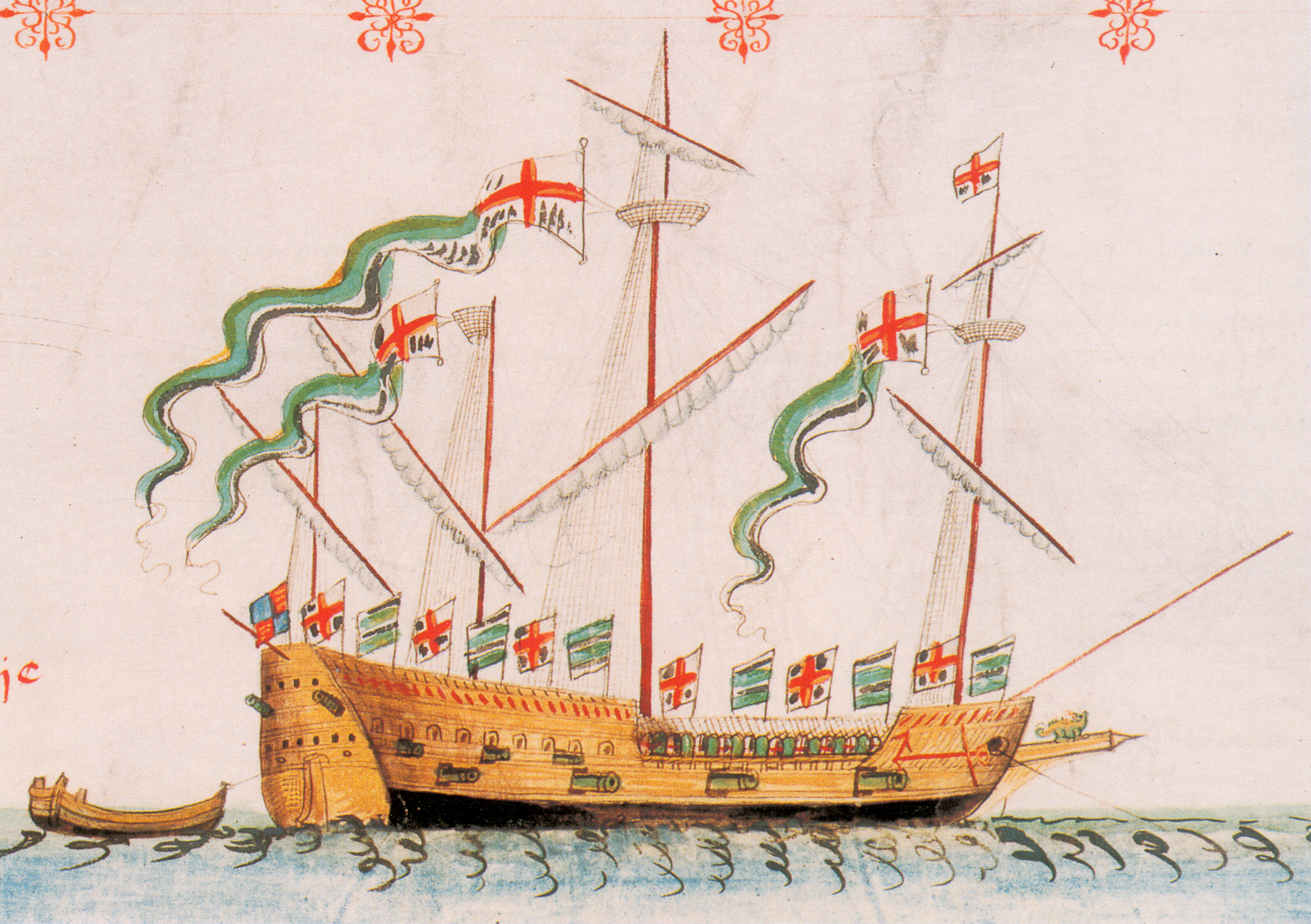
The captured Salamander, in the English Anthony Roll

James V entered his majority in 1524. He did not share his father's interest in developing a navy, relying on French gifts such as Salamander, or captured ships like the English Mary Willoughby. Scotland's shipbuilding remained largely at the level of boat building and ship repairs and fell behind the Low Countries which led the way into semi-industrialised shipbuilding. Despite truces between England and Scotland there were periodic outbreaks of a guerre de course in the 1530s with at least four of a known six men-at-war were royal naval vessels on the Scottish side. James V built a new harbour at Burntisland in 1542, called 'Our Lady Port' or 'New Haven,' described in 1544 as having three blockhouses with guns and a pier for great ships to lie in a dock.

The chief employment of naval power in his reign was in a series of expeditions to the Isles and France. In 1536 the king circumnavigated the Isles, embarking at Pittenweem in Fife and landing Whithorn in Galloway. Later in the year he sailed from Kirkcaldy with six ships including the 600 ton Mary Willoughby, and arrived at Dieppe to begin his courtship of his first wife Madeleine of Valois. After his marriage he sailed from Le Havre in Mary Willoughby to Leith with four great Scottish ships and ten French. After the death of Queen Madeleine, John Barton, in Salamander returned to France in 1538 to pick up the new queen, Mary of Guise, with Moriset and Mary Willoughby. In 1538 James V embarked on the newly equipped Salamander at Leith and accompanied by Mary Willoughby, Great Unicorn, Little Unicorn, Lion and twelve other ships sailed to Kirkwall on Orkney. Then he went to Lewis in the West, perhaps using the newly compiled charts from his first voyage known as Alexander Lindsay's Rutter.

=== Rough Wooing ===
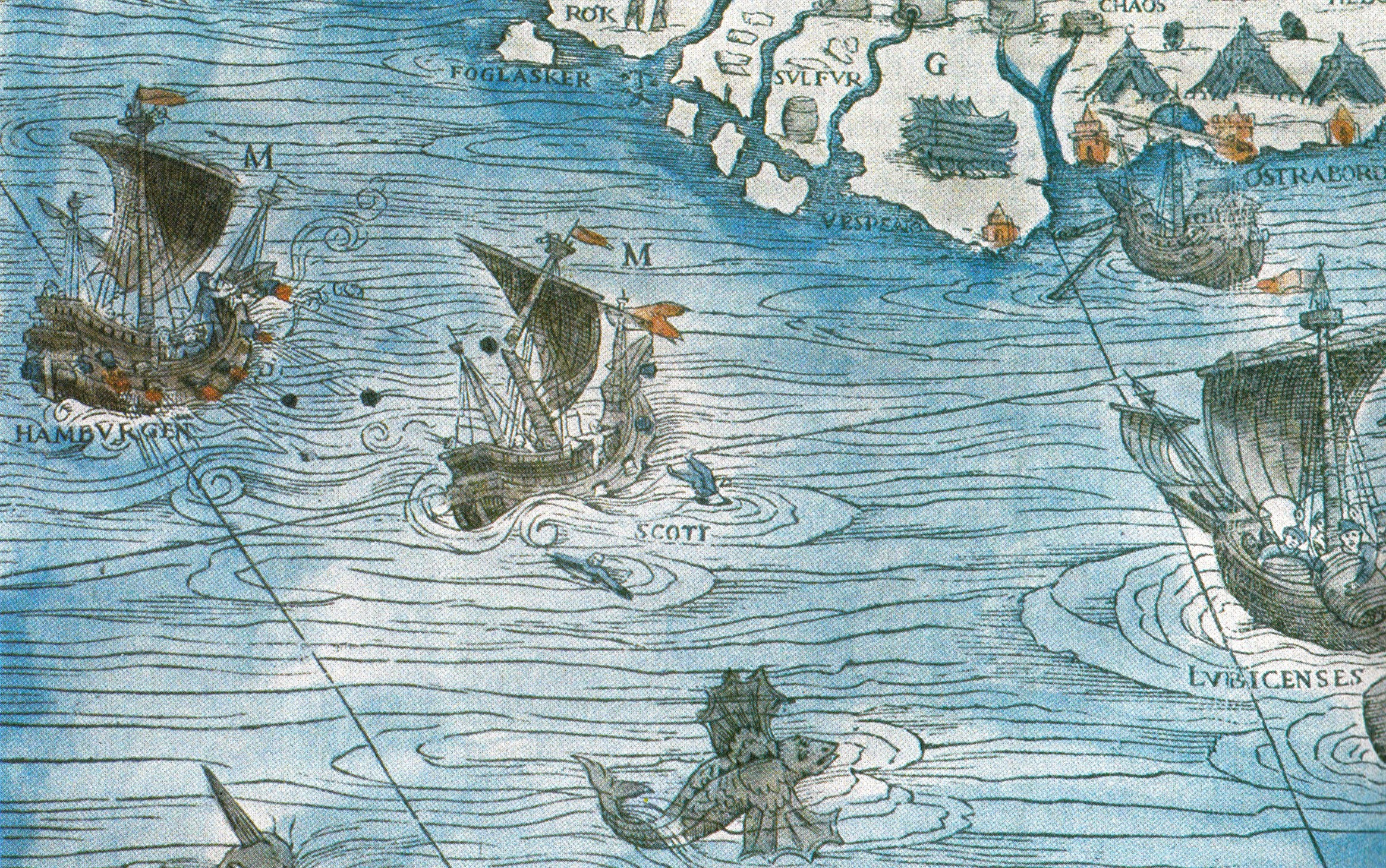
A Scottish armed merchantman engaged in the Baltic trade is attacked by a Hanseatic ship. Detail from Carta marina, by Olaus Magnus.

During the Rough Wooing, the attempt to force a marriage between James V's heir Mary, Queen of Scots and Henry VIII's son, the future Edward VI, in 1542, Mary Willoughby, Lion, and Salamander under the command of John Barton, son of Robert Barton, attacked merchants and fishermen off Whitby. They later blockaded a London merchant ship called Antony of Bruges in a creek on the coast of Brittany. In 1544 Edinburgh was attacked by an English marine force and burnt. Salamander and the Scottish-built Unicorn were captured at Leith. The Scots still had two royal naval vessels and numerous smaller private vessels.

When, as a result of the series of international treaties, Charles V declared war upon Scotland in 1544, the Scots were able to engage in a highly profitable campaign of privateering that lasted six years and the gains of which probably outweighed the losses in trade with the Habsburg Netherlands. Great Lion was captured off Dover in March 1547 by Sir Andrew Dudley, brother of the Duke of Northumberland. Mary Willoughby and Great Spaniard were blockading Dieppe and Le Havre in April 1547 when Mary Willoughby was recaptured by Lord Hertford. In 1547 Edward Clinton's invasion fleet of 60 ships, 35 of them warships, supported the English advance into Scotland. The naval superiority of the English fleet was demonstrated when the Mary Willoughby was recaptured, along with Bosse and an English prize, Anthony of Newcastle, without opposition off Blackness. In successive campaigns, the Scots had lost all four of their royal ships. They would have to rely on privateers until the re-establishment of a royal fleet in the 1620s. However, as the English fleet retreated for winter, the remaining Scots ships began to pick off stragglers and unwary English merchantmen. In June 1548 the situation was transformed by the arrival of a French squadron of three warships, 16 galleys and transports carrying 6,000 men. The English lost Pansy in an engagement with the galley fleet and their strategic situation began to deteriorate on land and sea, and the Treaty of Boulogne (1550) marked the end of the Rough Wooing and opened up a period of French dominance of Scottish affairs.

=== Battles on Orkney and Shetland ===
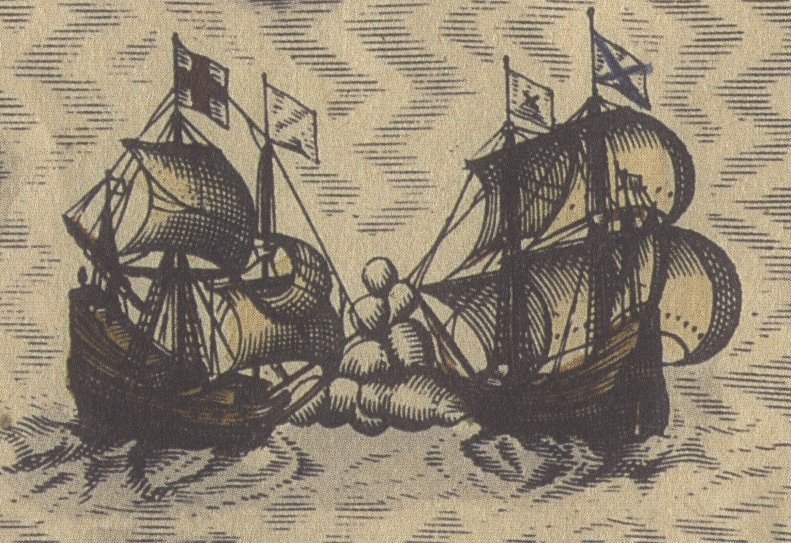
English and Scottish warships decoration on John Speed's Map of Scotland, 1610

The Scots operated in the West Indies from the 1540s, joining the French in the capture of Burburuta in 1567. English and Scottish naval warfare and privateering broke out sporadically in the 1550s. When Anglo-Scottish relations deteriorated again in 1557 as part of a wider war between Spain and France, small ships called 'shallops' were noted between Leith and France, passing as fishermen, but bringing munitions and money. Private merchant ships were rigged at Leith, Aberdeen and Dundee as men-of-war, and the regent Mary of Guise claimed English prizes, one over 200 tons, for her fleet.

The re-fitted Mary Willoughby sailed with 11 other ships against Scotland in August 1557, landing troops and six field guns on Orkney to attack Kirkwall Castle, St Magnus Cathedral and the Bishop's Palace. The English were repulsed by a Scottish force numbering 3000, and the English vice-admiral Sir John Clere of Ormesby was killed, but none of the English ships were lost. In July 1558, two Scottish warships from Aberdeen, owned by Thomas Nicholson, the Meikle Swallow and Little Swallow, attacked an English fleet off Shetland. The Scottish sailors took cattle and other goods belonging to Olave Sinclair on Mousa. Sinclair claimed compensation in the Edinburgh courts.

=== Reformation crisis ===
When the Protestant Elizabeth I came to the throne of England in 1558, the English party and the Protestants found their positions aligned and the Protestants asked for English military support to expel the French. In 1559, English captain William Winter was sent north with 34 ships and dispersed and captured the Scottish and French fleets, leading to the siege of the French forces in Leith, the eventual evacuation of the French from Scotland, and a successful coup of the Protestant Lords of the Congregation. Scottish and English interests were re-aligned and naval conflict subsided.

=== Marian Civil War ===
After Mary, Queen of Scots was captured at the Battle of Carberry Hill, the Earl of Bothwell took ship to Shetland. The Privy Council sent William Kirkcaldy of Grange and William Murray of Tullibardine in pursuit in August 1567. Some of their ships came from Dundee, including James, Primrose, and Robert. They encountered Bothwell in Bressay Sound near Lerwick. Four of Bothwell's ships in the Sound set sail north to Unst, where Bothwell was negotiating with German captains to hire more ships. Kirkcaldy's flagship, Lion, chased one of Bothwell's ships, and both ships were damaged on a submerged rock. Bothwell sent his treasure ship to Scalloway, and fought a three-hour-long sea battle off the Port of Unst, where the mast of one of Bothwell's ships was shot away. Subsequently, a storm forced him to sail towards Norway.

When Mary's supporters, led by Kirkcaldy, held Edinburgh Castle in April 1573, prolonging civil war in Scotland, the guns from Stirling Castle were brought to Leith in four boats. Regent Morton hired two ships in Leith with their masters John Cockburn and William Downy and 80 men for eight days. These masters of Leith sailed to Berwick upon Tweed to meet and convoy the English ships carrying the guns to bombard Edinburgh Castle.

=== James VI goes to Denmark ===
James VI hired ships for his ambassadors and other uses, and in 1588 James Royall of Ayr, belonging to Robert Jameson, was fitted out for Sir William Stewart of Carstairs to pursue the rebel Lord Maxwell with 120 musketeers or "hagbutters". In October 1589 James VI decided to sail to Norway to meet his bride Anne of Denmark. His courtiers, led by the Chancellor of Scotland John Maitland of Thirlestane equipped a fleet of six ships. Patrick Vans of Barnbarroch hired Falcon of Leith from John Gibson, described as a little ship.

Maitland's expenses detail the preparation of James Royall, which was equipped with cannon by the Comptroller of Ordinance John Chisholm for the use of the royal gunner James Rocknow, usually based at Edinburgh Castle. The guns were probably intended for firing salutes. The sails of James were decorated with red taffeta. James VI sent Robert Dog from Denmark to Lübeck to buy gunpowder which he shipped to Edinburgh castle. James VI sent orders from Denmark to the town of Edinburgh requesting the council hire a ship for his return. They chose the Angel of Kirkcaldy, belonging to David Hucheson, and this ship was painted by James Warkman. When Captain Robert Jameson died in January 1608 James was at Ayr, unrigged and stripped of its furniture.

== Seventeenth century ==
=== Royal and marque fleets ===
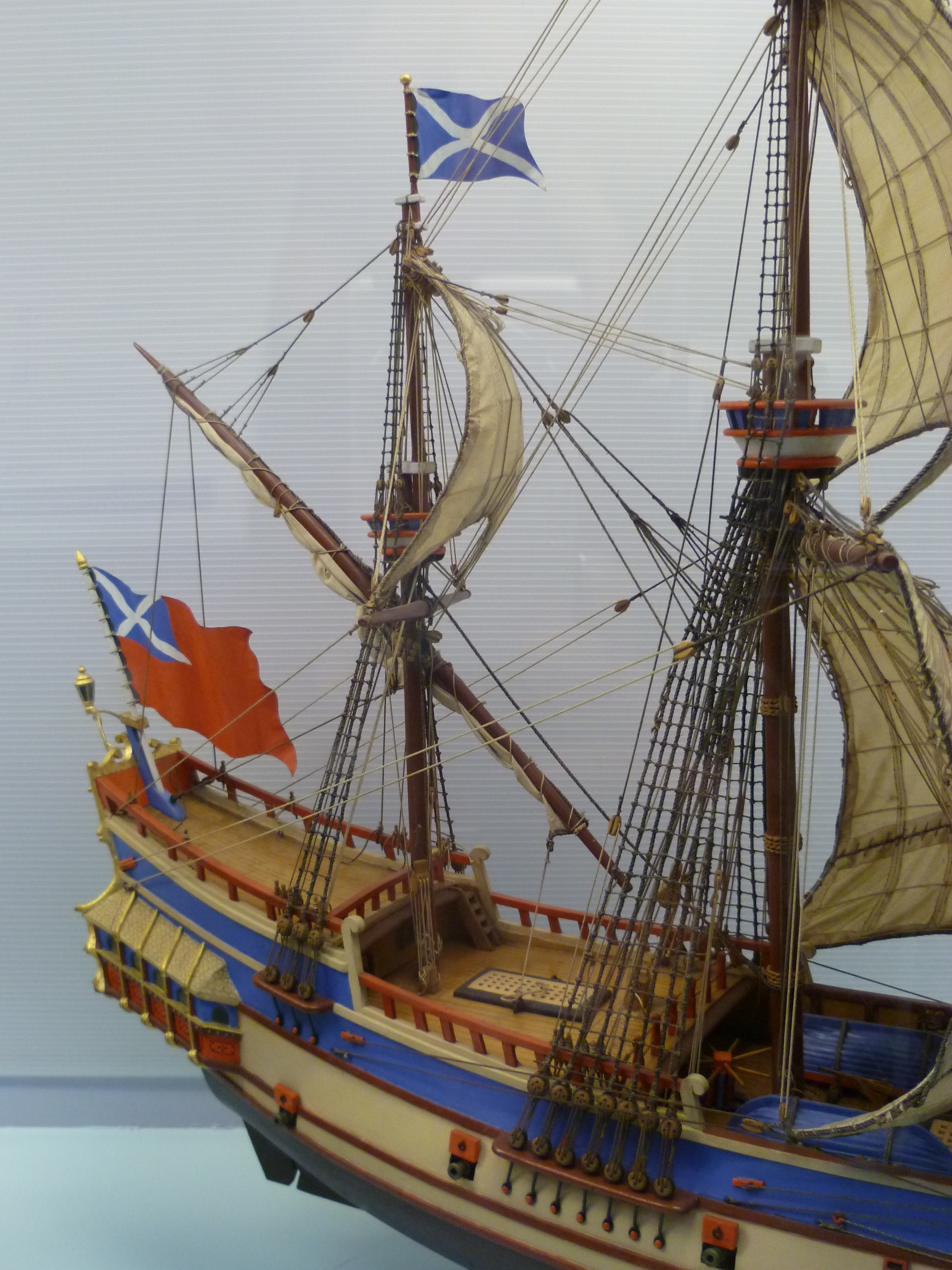
The Red Ensign flown on a mid-17thC Scottish merchant ship. An exhibit in the National Museum of Scotland.

After the Union of Crowns in 1603 conflict between Scotland and England ended, but Scotland became involved in England's foreign policy, opening up Scottish merchant shipping to attack. In the 1620s, Scotland became engaged in a naval conflict as England's ally, first against Spain and then also against France, while simultaneously embroiled in undeclared North Sea commitments in the Danish intervention in the Thirty Years' War. In 1626 a squadron of three ships was bought and equipped, at a cost of at least £5,200 sterling, to guard against privateers operating out of Spanish-controlled Dunkirk and other ships were armed in preparation for potential action. The acting High Admiral John Gordon of Lochinvar organised as many as three marque fleets of privateers. It was probably one of Lochinvar's marque fleets that were sent to support the English Royal Navy in defending Irish waters in 1626. In 1627, the Royal Scots Navy and accompanying contingents of burgh privateers participated in the major expedition to Biscay. The Scots also returned to the West Indies, with Lochinvar taking French prizes and establishing the Scottish colony of Charles Island. In 1629 two squadrons of privateers led by Lochinvar and William Lord Alexander, sailed for Canada, taking part in the campaign that resulted in the capture of Quebec from the French, which was handed back after the subsequent peace.

=== Covenanter navies ===
During the Bishops' Wars (1639–40) the king attempted to blockade Scotland and disrupt trade and the transport of returning troops from the continent. The king planned amphibious assaults from England on the East coast and from Ireland to the West, but they failed to materialise. Scottish privateers took a number of English prizes and the Covenanters planned to fit out Dutch ships with Scottish and Dutch crews to join the naval war effort. After the Covenanters allied with the English Parliament they established two patrol squadrons for the Atlantic and North Sea coasts, known collectively as the "Scotch Guard". These patrols guarded against Royalist attempts to move men, money and munitions and raids on Scottish shipping, particularly from the Irish Confederate fleet at Wexford and Royalist forces at Dunkirk. They consisted mainly of small English warships, controlled by the Commissioners of the Navy based in London, but it always relied heavily on Scottish officers and revenues, and after 1646 the West Coast squadron became much more a Scottish force. The Scottish navy was easily overcome by the English fleet that accompanied the army led by Oliver Cromwell that conquered Scotland in 1649–51 and after his victory the Scottish ships and crews were divided among the Commonwealth fleet.

=== Restoration navy ===
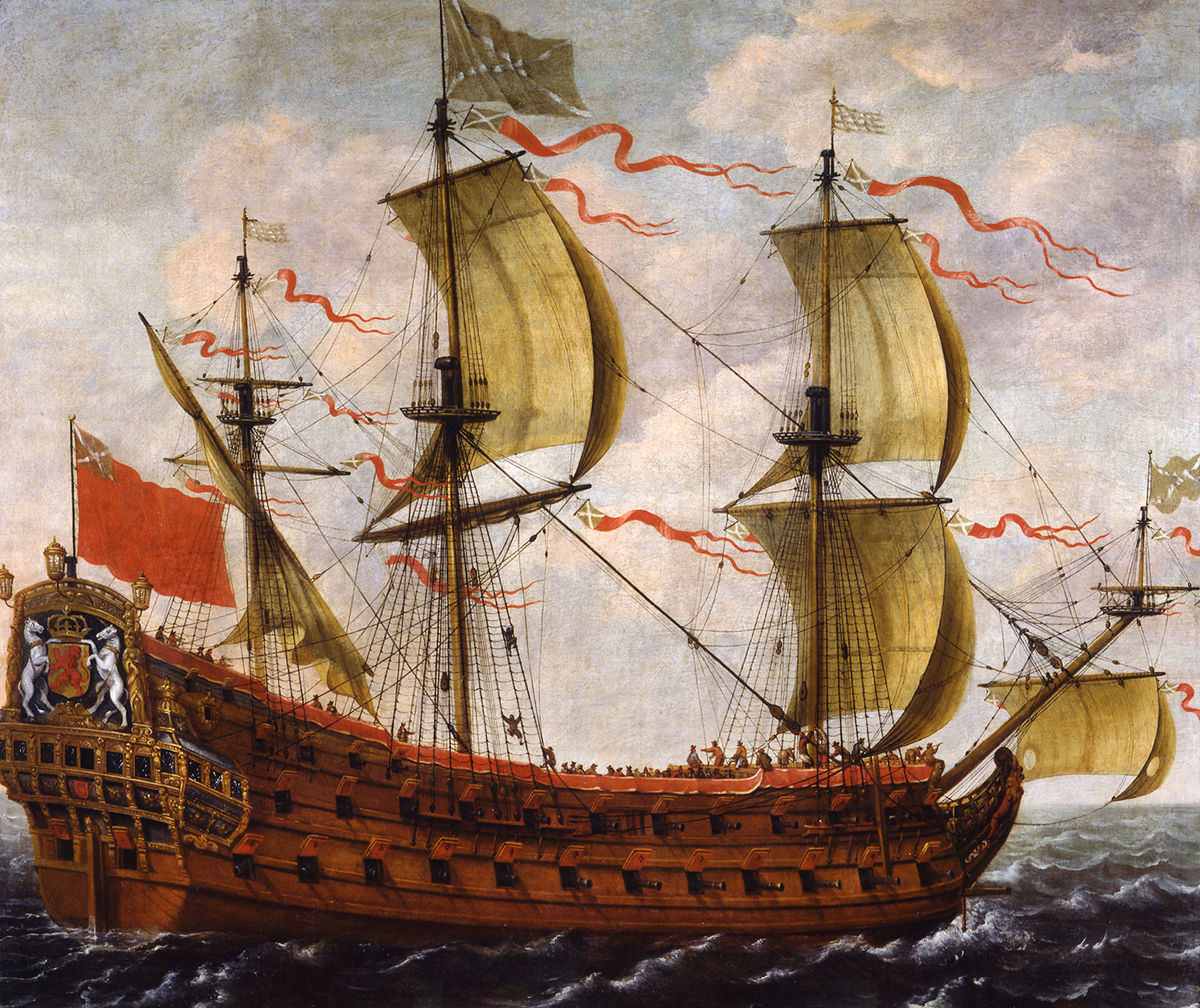
Painting of a Scottish ship, perhaps part of the Darien fleet, by an unknown artist

Although Scottish seamen received protection against arbitrary impressment thanks to Charles II, a fixed quota of conscripts for the Royal Navy was levied from the sea-coast burghs during the second half of the seventeenth century. Royal Navy patrols were now found in Scottish waters even in peacetime, such as the small ship-of-the-line HMS Kingfisher, which bombarded Carrick Castle during the Earl of Argyll's rebellion in 1685. Scotland went to war against the Dutch and their allies in the Second (1665–67) and Third Anglo-Dutch Wars (1672–74) as an independent kingdom. A very large number of Scottish captains, at least as many as 80 and perhaps 120, took letters of marque, and privateers played a major part in the naval conflict of the wars.

By 1697 the English Royal Navy had 323 warships, while Scotland was still dependent on merchantmen and privateers. In the 1690s, two separate schemes for larger naval forces were put in motion. As usual, the larger part was played by the merchant community rather than the government. The first was the Darien Scheme to found a Scottish colony in Spanish-controlled America. It was undertaken by the Company of Scotland, who created a fleet of five ships, including Caledonia and St. Andrew, all built or chartered in Holland and Hamburg. It sailed to the Isthmus of Darien in 1698, but the venture failed and only one ship returned to Scotland. In the same period it was decided to establish a professional navy for the protection of commerce in home waters during the Nine Years' War (1688–97) with France, with three purpose-built warships bought from English shipbuilders in 1696. These were Royal William, a 32-gun fifth rate and two smaller ships, Royal Mary and Dumbarton Castle, each of 24 guns, generally described as frigates.

After the Act of Union in 1707, the Scottish Navy merged with that of England. The office of Lord High Admiral was subsumed within the office of the Lord High Admiral of Great Britain. The three vessels of the small Royal Scottish Navy were transferred to the Royal Navy. A number of Scottish officers eventually left the Royal Navy for service in the fledgling Russian navy of Peter the Great. These included the captain of Royal Mary Thomas Gordon, who became a commodore in 1717 took service and rose to be Admiral and commander-in-chief of the Baltic Fleet.

== Officers ==
- Andrew Barton
- Robert Barton of Over Barnton
- Thomas Gordon
- Andrew Wood of Largo

== See also ==
- List of warships of the Scots Navy
- Royal Navy (disambiguation)
