= Rating system of the Royal Navy =

Historic category for ships

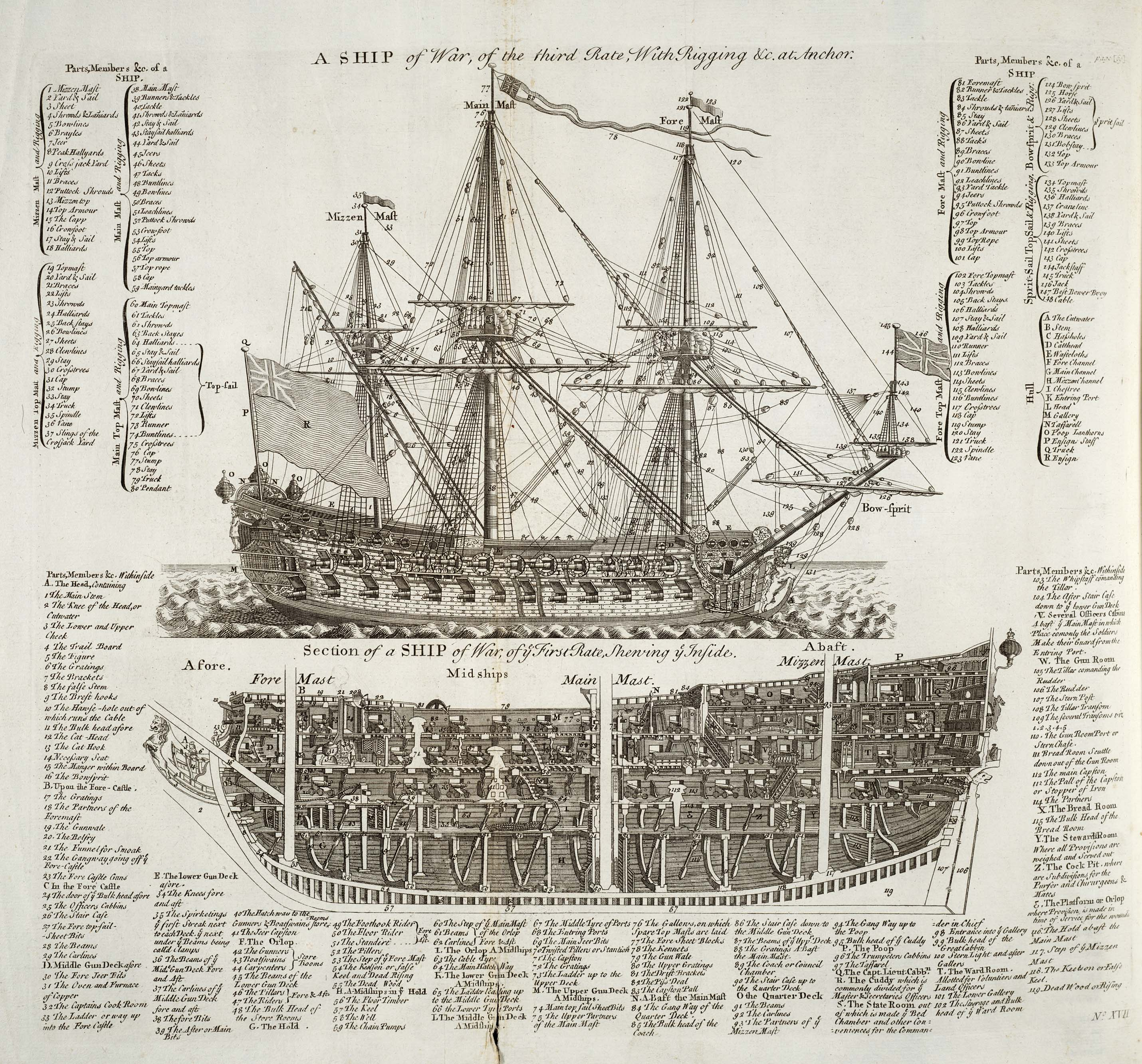
A 1728 diagram illustrating a first- and a third-rate ship

The rating system of the Royal Navy and its predecessors were used by the Royal Navy between the beginning of the 17th century and the middle of the 19th century to categorise sailing warships, initially classing them according to their assigned complement of men, and later according to the number of their carriage-mounted guns. The rating system of the Royal Navy formally came to an end in the late 19th century by declaration of the Admiralty; rating ships by the number of guns had become obsolete with new types of gun, the introduction of steam propulsion and the use of iron and steel armour.

== Origins and description ==
The first movement towards an English naval rating system began in the early 16th century, when the largest carracks in the Tudor navy, such as Mary Rose, Peter Pomegranate and Henry Grace à Dieu, were denoted as "great ships". This was due only to their size, not to their weight, crew or number of guns. When these carracks were superseded by galleons later in the 16th century, the term "great ship" was used to formally delineate the English navy's largest ships.

=== The Stuart era ===
The earliest categorisation of Royal Navy ships dates to the reign of King Henry VIII. Henry's navy consisted of 58 ships, and in 1546 the Anthony Roll divided them into four groups: "ships, galliasses, (Note: Galliasses, not to be confused with the Mediterranean vessel of the same name.) pinnaces, and row barges". (Note: "The earliest naval list in which any classification of ships appears, is dated 1546, and it divides the fifty-eight ships of Henry VIII's Navy, according to their "quality, into... 'ships, galliasses, pinnaces, and cow barges.'" Adams (1885) p. 128)

The formal system of dividing up the Navy's combatant warships into a number or groups or "rates", however, only originated in the very early part of the Stuart era, with the first lists of such categorisation appearing around 1604. At this time the combatant ships of the "Navy Royal" (Note: The term "Royal Navy" was only introduced after the Restoration of Charles II in 1660.) were divided up according to the size of the crew they required into four groups:

- Royal Ships – the largest ships in the previous "great ships" grouping, mounting 42–55 guns and carrying at least 400 men;
- Great Ships – the rest of the ships in the previous "great ships" grouping, mounting 38–40 guns;
- Middling ships mounting 30–32 guns; and
- Small ships mounting fewer than 30 guns

A 1612 list referred to four groups: royal, middling, small and pinnaces; but defined them by tonnage instead of by guns, starting from 800 to 1200 tons for the ships royal, down to below 250 tons for the pinnaces. (Note: Another list, dated 1612, divides them into 'ships royal, measuring from twelve hundred to eight hundred tons; middling ships, from eight hundred to six hundred tons; small ships, three hundred and fifty tons; and pinnaces, from two hundred and fifty to eight tons.'" Adams (1885) p. 128.)

By the early years of King Charles I's reign, these four groups had been renamed to a numerical sequence. The royal ships were now graded as first rank, the great ships as second rank, the middling ships as third rank, and the small ships as fourth rank. Soon afterwards, the structure was again modified, with the term rank now being replaced by rate, and the former small ships now being sub-divided into fourth, fifth and sixth rates.

The earliest rating was based not on the number of guns, but on the established complement (number of men). In 1626, a table drawn up by Charles I used the term rates for the first time in a classification scheme connected with the Navy. The table specified the amount of monthly wages a seaman or officer would earn, in an ordered scheme of six rates, from "first-rate" to "sixth-rate", with each rate divided into two classes, with differing numbers of men assigned to each class. No specific connection with the size of the ship or number of armaments aboard was given in this 1626 table, and as far as is known, this was related exclusively to seaman pay grades. (Note: The division of the navy into 'rates' appears for the first time in a table drawn up by Charles I, in 1626, and entitled 'The New Rates for Seaman's monthly wages, confirmed by the Commissioners of His Majesty's Navy, according to His Majesty's several rates of ships, and degrees of officers'. Herein are distinctly specified six rates, consisting each of two classes, to which different complements of men are assigned, though, unfortunately, their armaments are not specified. This mode of division would seem to have been adopted for the purpose of regulating the pay of the officers and seamen, rather than with the view of marking any distinction in the force or construction of the shapes." Adams (1885) p.128.)

This classification scheme was substantially altered in late 1653 as the complements of individual ships were raised. From about 1660 the classification moved from one based on the number of men to one based on the number of carriage guns a ship carried.

Samuel Pepys, then Secretary to the Admiralty, revised the structure in 1677 and laid it down as a "solemn, universal and unalterable" classification. The rating of a ship was of administrative and military use. The number and weight of guns determined the size of crew needed, and hence the amount of pay and rations needed. It also indicated whether a ship was powerful enough to stand in the line of battle. Pepys's original classification was updated by further definitions in 1714, 1721, 1760, 1782, 1801 and 1817, the last being the most severe, as it provided for including in the count of guns the carronades that had previously been excluded. On the whole the trend was for each rate to have a greater number of guns. For instance, Pepys allowed a first rate 90–100 guns, but on the 1801 scheme a first rate had 100–120. A sixth rate's range went from 4–18 to 20–28. After 1714 any ship with fewer than 20 guns was unrated.

=== First, second and third rates (ships of the line) ===
A first-, second- or third-rate ship was regarded as a "ship-of-the-line". The first and second rates were three-deckers; that is, they had three continuous decks of guns (on the lower deck, middle deck and upper deck), usually as well as smaller weapons on the quarterdeck, forecastle and poop.

The largest third-rates, those of 80 guns, were likewise three-deckers from the 1690s until the early 1750s, but both before and after this period 80-gun ships were built as two-deckers. All the other third rates, with 74 guns or less, were likewise two-deckers, with just two continuous decks of guns (on the lower deck and upper deck), as well as smaller weapons on the quarterdeck, forecastle and (if they had one) poop. A series of major changes to the rating system took effect from the start of January 1817, when the carronades carried by each ship were included in the count of guns (previously these had usually been omitted); the first rate from that date included all of the three-deckers (the adding in of their carronades had meant that all three-deckers now had over 100 guns), the new second rate included all two-deckers of 80 guns or more, with the third rate reduced to two-deckers of fewer than 80 guns.

A special case were the Royal Yachts, which, for reasons of protocol, had to be commanded by a senior captain. These vessels, despite their small size and minimal armament, were often classed as second- or third-rate ships, appropriate for the seniority of the captain.

=== Fourth, fifth and sixth rates ===
The smaller fourth rates, of about 50 or 60 guns on two decks, were ships-of-the-line until 1756, when it was felt that such 50-gun ships were now too small for pitched battles. The larger fourth rates of 60 guns continued to be counted as ships-of-the-line, but few new ships of this rate were added, the 60-gun fourth rate being superseded over the next few decades by the 64-gun third rate. The Navy did retain some fourth rates for convoy escort, or as flagships on far-flung stations; it also converted some East Indiamen to that role.

The smaller two deckers originally blurred the distinction between a fourth rate and a fifth rate. At the low end of the fourth rate one might find the two-decker 50-gun ships from about 1756. The high end of the fifth rate would include two-deckers of 40- or 44-guns (from 1690) or even the demi-batterie 32-gun and 36-gun ships of the 1690–1730 period. The fifth rates at the start of the 18th century were generally "demi-batterie" ships, carrying a few heavy guns on their lower deck (which often used the rest of the lower deck for row ports) and a full battery of lesser guns on the upper deck. However, these were gradually phased out, as the low freeboard (i.e., the height of the lower deck gunport sills above the waterline) meant that in rough weather it was often impossible to open the lower deck gunports.

Fifth and sixth rates were never included among ships-of-the-line. The middle of the 18th century saw the introduction of a new fifth-rate type—the classic frigate, with no ports on the lower deck, and the main battery disposed solely on the upper deck, where it could be fought in all weathers.

Sixth-rate ships were generally useful as convoy escorts, for blockade duties and the carrying of dispatches; their small size made them less suited for the general cruising tasks the fifth-rate frigates did so well. Essentially there were two groups of sixth rates. The larger category comprised the sixth-rate frigates of 28 guns, carrying a main battery of twenty-four 9-pounder guns, as well as four smaller guns on their superstructures. The second comprised the "post ships" of between 20 and 24 guns. These were too small to be formally counted as frigates (although colloquially often grouped with them), but still required a post-captain (i.e. an officer holding the substantive rank of captain) as their commander.

=== Unrated vessels ===
The rating system did not handle vessels smaller than the sixth rate. The remainder were simply "unrated". The larger of the unrated vessels were generally all called sloops, but that nomenclature is quite confusing for unrated vessels, especially when dealing with the finer points of "ship-sloop", "brig-sloop", "sloop-of-war" (which really just meant the same in naval parlance as "sloop") or even "corvette" (the last a French term that the British Navy did not use until the 1840s). Technically the category of "sloop-of-war" included any unrated combatant vessel—in theory, the term even extended to bomb vessels and fire ships. During the Napoleonic Wars, the Royal Navy increased the number of sloops in service by some 400% as it found that it needed vast numbers of these small vessels for escorting convoys (as in any war, the introduction of convoys created a huge need for escort vessels), combating privateers, and themselves taking prizes.

== The number of guns and the rate ==
The rated number of guns often differed from the number a vessel actually carried. The guns that determined a ship's rating were the carriage-mounted cannon, long-barreled, muzzle-loading guns that moved on 'trucks'—wooden wheels. The count did not include smaller (and basically anti-personnel) weapons such as swivel-mounted guns ("swivels"), which fired half-pound projectiles, or small arms. For instance, HMS Cynthia was rated for 18 guns but during construction her rating was reduced to 16 guns (6-pounders), and she also carried 14 half-pound swivels.

Vessels might also carry other guns that did not contribute to the rating. Examples of such weapons would include mortars, howitzers or boat guns, the boat guns being small guns intended for mounting on the bow of a vessel's boats to provide fire support during landings, cutting out expeditions, and the like. From 1778, however, the most important exception was the carronade.

Introduced in the late 1770s, the carronade was a short-barreled and relatively short-range gun, half the weight of equivalent long guns, and was generally mounted on a slide rather than on trucks. The new carronades were generally housed on a vessel's upperworks—quarterdeck and forecastle—some as additions to its existing ordnance and some as replacements. When the carronades replaced or were in lieu of carriage-mounted cannon they generally counted in arriving at the rating, but not all were, and so may or may not have been included in the count of guns, though rated vessels might carry up to twelve 18-, 24- or 32-pounder carronades.

For instance, HMS Armada was rated as a third rate of 74 guns. She carried twenty-eight 32-pounder guns on her gundeck, twenty-eight 18-pounder guns on her upperdeck, four 12-pounder guns and ten 32-pounder carronades on her quarterdeck, two 12-pounder guns and two 32-pounder carronades on her forecastle, and six 18-pounder carronades on her poop deck. In all, this 74-gun vessel carried 80 cannon: 62 guns and 18 carronades.

When carronades formed a ship's principal armament, they were included in the count of guns. For instance, HMS Bonne Citoyenne was a 20-gun corvette of the French Navy that was captured and recommissioned in the Royal Navy as a sloop and post ship. She carried two 9-pounder cannon and eighteen 32-pounder carronades.

By the Napoleonic Wars there was no exact correlation between formal gun rating and the actual number of cannons any individual vessel might carry. One therefore must distinguish between the established armament of a vessel (which rarely altered) and the actual guns carried, which might change quite frequently for a variety of reasons: guns might be lost overboard during a storm, be jettisoned to speed the ship during a chase, or explode in service and become useless; they might also be stowed in the hold to allow the carriage of troops, or, for a small vessel such as HMS Ballahoo, to lower the centre of gravity and thus improve stability in bad weather. Some guns would also be removed from ships during peacetime service, to reduce the stress on the ships' structure, creating a distinction between a ship's wartime complement of guns (the figure normally quoted) and her lower peacetime complement.

== Royal Navy rating system in force during the Napoleonic Wars ==
Type	Rate	Guns	Gun decks	Rank of commanding officer	Men	Approximate burthen in tons^{*}	In commission 1794	In commission 1814
Ship of the line or great frigate^{*}	1st rate	100+	3	Captain	850 to 875	2,500	5	8
Ship of the line or great frigate^{*}	2nd rate	80 to 98	3	Captain	700 to 750	2,200	9	7
Ship of the line or great frigate^{*}	3rd rate	64 to 80	2	Captain	500 to 650	1,750	71	103
Ship of the line or great frigate^{*}	4th rate	50 to 60	2	Captain	320 to 420	1,000	8	10
Great frigate^{*} or frigate	5th rate	32 to 44	1 to 2	Captain	200 to 300	700 to 1,450	78	134
Great frigate^{*} or frigate	6th rate	28	1	Captain	200	450 to 550	22	Nil
Frigate^{*} or post ship	6th rate	20 to 24	1	Captain	140 to 160	340 to 450	10	25
Sloop-of-war	Unrated	16 to 18	1	Commander	90 to 125	380	76	360
Gun-brig, brig, cutter, or schooner	Unrated	4 to 14	1	Lieutenant or Commander*	20 to 90	< 220		

=== Notes ===
^* The smaller fourth-rates, primarily the 50-gun ships, were, from 1756 on, no longer classified as ships of the line. Since they were not big enough to stand in the line of battle, they were often called frigates, though not classed as frigates by the Royal Navy. They were generally classified, like all smaller warships used primarily in the role of escort and patrol, as "cruisers", a term that covered everything from the smaller two-deckers down to the small gun-brigs and cutters.

^* The larger fifth-rates were generally two-decked ships of 40 or 44 guns, and thus not "frigates", although the 40-gun frigates built during the Napoleonic War also fell into this category.

^* The smaller sixth-rates were often popularly called frigates, though not classed as "frigates" by the Admiralty officially. Only the larger sixth-rates (those mounting 28 carriage guns or more) were technically frigates.

^* The ton in this instance is the burthen tonnage (bm). From c.1650 to 1694 the burthen of a vessel was calculated using the formula $\frac {k \times b \times \frac 1 2 b} {94}$, where $k$ was the length, in feet, from the stem to the sternpost, and $b$ the maximum breadth of the vessel. It was a rough measurement of cargo-carrying capacity by volume, not displacement. Therefore, one should not change a measurement in "tons burthen" into a displacement in "tons" or "tonnes".

^* Vessels of less than ten guns were commanded by lieutenants, while those with upwards of ten guns were commanded by commanders.

== 1817 changes ==
In February 1817 the rating system changed. The recommendation from the Board of Admiralty to the Prince Regent was dated 25 November 1816, but the Order in Council establishing the new ratings was issued in February 1817. From February 1817 all carronades were included in the established number of guns. Until that date, carronades only "counted" if they were in place of long guns; when the carronades replaced "long" guns (e.g. on the upper deck of a sloop or post ship, thus providing its main battery), such carronades were counted.

== 1856 changes ==
There was a further major change in the rating system in 1856. From that date, the first rate comprised all ships carrying 110 guns and upwards, or the complement of which consisted of 1,000 men or more. The second rate included one of HM's royal yachts, and otherwise comprised all ships carrying under 110 guns but more than 80 guns, or the complements of which were under 1,000 but not less than 800 men.

The third rate included all the rest of HM's royal yachts and "all such vessels as may bear the flag of pendant of any Admiral Superintendent or Captain Superintendent of one of HM's Dockyards", and otherwise comprised all ships carrying at most 80 guns but not less than 60 guns, or the complements of which were under 800 but not less than 600 men. The fourth rate comprised all frigate-built ships of which the complement was not more than 600 and not less than 410 men.

The fifth rate comprised all ships of which the complement was not more than 400 and not less than 300 men. The sixth rate consisted of all other ships bearing a captain. Of unrated vessels, the category of sloops comprised all vessels commanded by commanders. Next followed all other ships commanded by lieutenants, and having complements of not less than 60 men. Finally were "smaller vessels, not classed as above, with such smaller complements as the Lords Commissioners of the Admiralty may from time to time direct".

== Other classifications ==
Rating was not the only system of classification used. Through the early modern period, the term "ship" referred to a vessel that carried square sails on three masts. Sailing vessels with only two masts or a single mast were technically not "ships", and were not described as such at the time. Vessels with fewer than three masts were unrated sloops, generally two-masted vessels rigged as snows or ketches (in the first half of the 18th century), or brigs in succeeding eras. Some sloops were three-masted or "ship-rigged", and these were known as "ship sloops".

Vessels were sometimes classified according to the substantive rank of her commanding officer. For instance, when the commanding officer of a gun-brig or even a cutter was a lieutenant with the status of master-and-commander, the custom was to recategorise the vessel as a sloop. For instance, when Pitt Burnaby Greene, the commanding officer of Bonne Citoyenne in 1811, received his promotion to post-captain, the Navy reclassed the sloop as a post ship.

== Practices in other navies ==
Although the rating system described was only used by the Royal Navy, other major navies used similar means of grading their warships. For example, the French Navy used a system of five rates ("rangs") which had a similar purpose. British authors might still use "first rate" when referring to the largest ships of other nations or "third rate" to speak of a French seventy-four. By the end of the 18th century, the rating system had mostly fallen out of common use, although technically it remained in existence for nearly another century, ships of the line usually being characterized directly by their nominal number of guns, the numbers even being used as the name of the type, as in "a squadron of three seventy-fours".

=== United States (1905) ===
As of 1905, ships of the United States Navy were by law divided into classes called rates. Vessels of the first rate had a displacement tonnage in excess of 8000 tons; second rate, from 4000 to 8000 tons; third rate, from 1000 to 4000 tons; and fourth rate, of less than 1000 tons. Converted merchant vessels that were armed and equipped as cruisers were of the second rate if over 6000 tons, and of the third rate if over 1000 and less than 6000 tons. Auxiliary vessels such as colliers, supply vessels, repair ships, etc., if over 4000 tons, were of the third rate.

Auxiliary vessels of less than 4000 tons—except tugs, sailing ships, and receiving ships which were not rated—were of the fourth rate. Torpedo-boat destroyers, torpedo boats, and similar vessels were not rated. Captains commanded ships of the first rate. Captains or commanders commanded ships of the second rate. Commanders or lieutenant-commanders commanded ships of the third rate. Lieutenant-commanders or lieutenants commanded ships of the fourth rate. Lieutenant-commanders, lieutenants, ensigns, or warrant officers might command unrated vessels, depending on the size of the vessel.

== Other uses ==
The term first-rate has passed into general usage, as an adjective used to mean something of the best or highest quality available. Second-rate and third-rate are also used as adjectives to mean that something is of inferior quality.

== Bibliography ==
- Bennett, G. (2004). "2 Fighting Sali". The Battle of Trafalgar. Barnsley, United Kingdom: Seaforth. pp. 17–52. ISBN 1844151077.
- Rodger, N.A.M. (2004). "A Note on Conventions". The Command of the Ocean, a Naval History of Britain 1649–1815. London: Allan Lane. pp. xxvi–xxvii. ISBN 0713994118.
- Winfield, Rif (2009). British Warships in the Age of Sail 1603–1714: Design, Construction, Careers and Fates. Barnsley, United Kingdom: Seaforth. ISBN 9781848320406.
- Winfield, Rif (2010). "1. The Jacobean and Commonwealth First Rate". First rate: The Greatest Warships of the Age of Sail. Pen and Sword. FROM SHIP ROYAL TO FIRST RATE. ISBN 9781591142645.
