= Andrew Wood of Largo =

Scottish sea captain

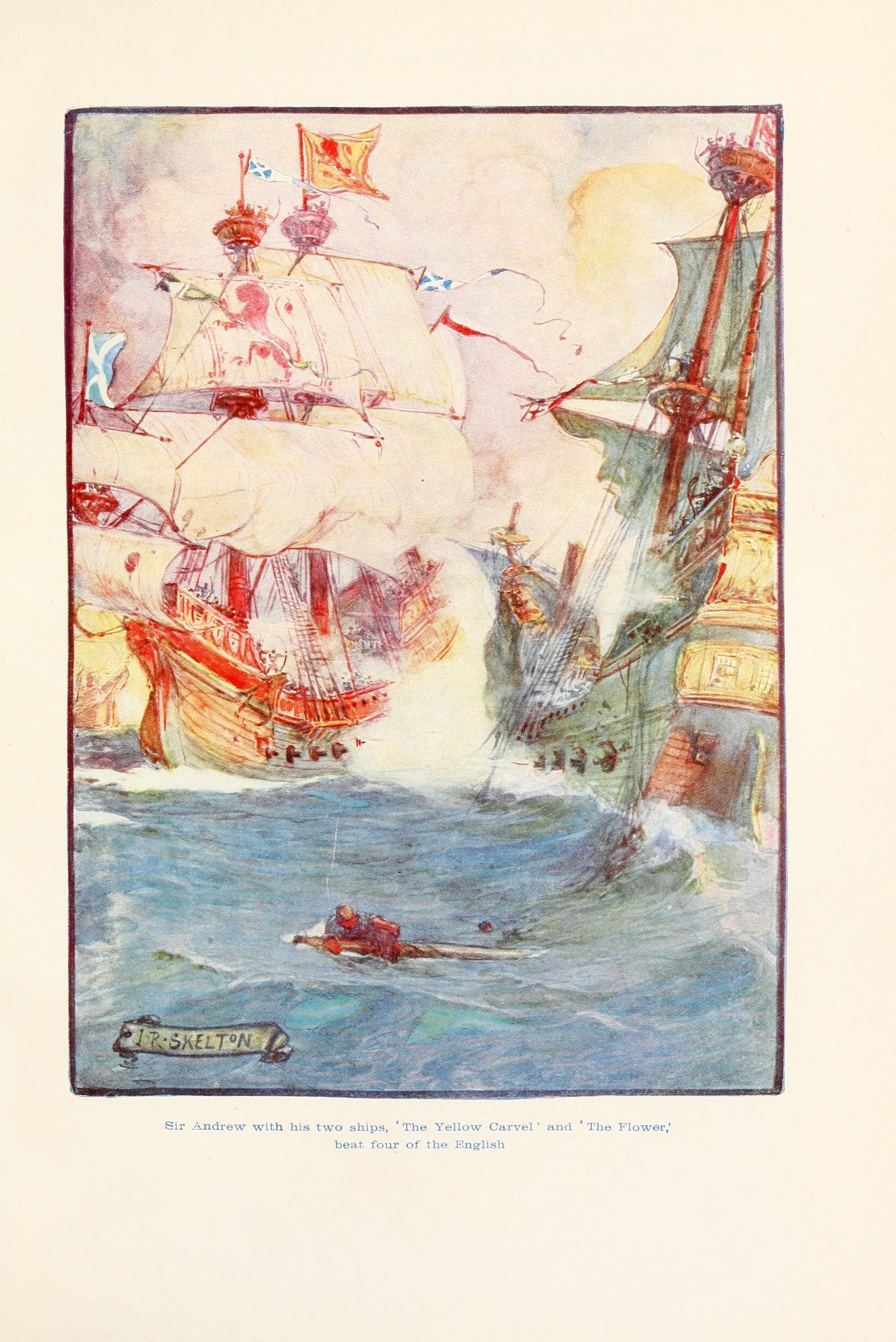
- Sir Andrew with two ships 'The yellow Carvel' and 'The Flower' beat four of the English
- Born: Scotland
- Died: 1515 Scotland
- Allegiance: Kingdom of Scotland
- Branch: Royal Scots Navy
- Service years: 1488-1515
- Rank: Captain

Sir Andrew Wood of Largo (died 1515) was a Scottish sea captain. Beginning as a merchant in Leith, he was involved in national naval actions and rose to become Lord High Admiral of Scotland. He was knighted c. 1495. He may have transported James III across the Firth of Forth to escape the rebels in 1488.

== Life ==
Andrew Wood's family lands were at Largo, Fife. The family are traditionally thought to be a branch of the Wood family from Bonnington or Bonnyton in Angus. Probably beginning his career as a merchant in Leith, he was knighted by James III and married Elizabeth Lundie.

According to tradition, Wood was given a grant of the lands of Largo around 1480, in return for the service of maintaining a ship to take the King and Queen on pilgrimages to the shrine and well of Saint Adrian on the Isle of May. It was believed that a visit to the shrine could help a woman become pregnant.

James IV confirmed the royal gift of the lands of Largo in July 1488. On 18 May 1491, James IV gave permission for the building of a castle with iron gates or "yetts" at Largo. Wood was keeper of Dunbar Castle and superintended the rebuilding and repairs in 1497. As a reward for his services at Dunbar in defence against the English army and fleet, James IV gave him lands in 1504, and on 21 August 1513, James IV made his lands a free barony. A clause of this grant stipulates that Wood should be ready to ferry James IV and Margaret Tudor to the Isle of May.

The Latin clause from the 1513 charter reads "in peregrinationem nobiscum et cum carissima consorte nostra et successoribus nostris ad insulam de Mayo cum ad hoc requisiti fuerint", which can be translated as "to travel with us and with our dearest wife and our successors to the Isle of May whenever they shall be required for this purpose".

His heir was Andrew Wood. Another son, John Wood was assassinated in 1570. Andrew Wood is the subject of the historical novel The Admiral by Nigel Tranter.

== Naval career ==
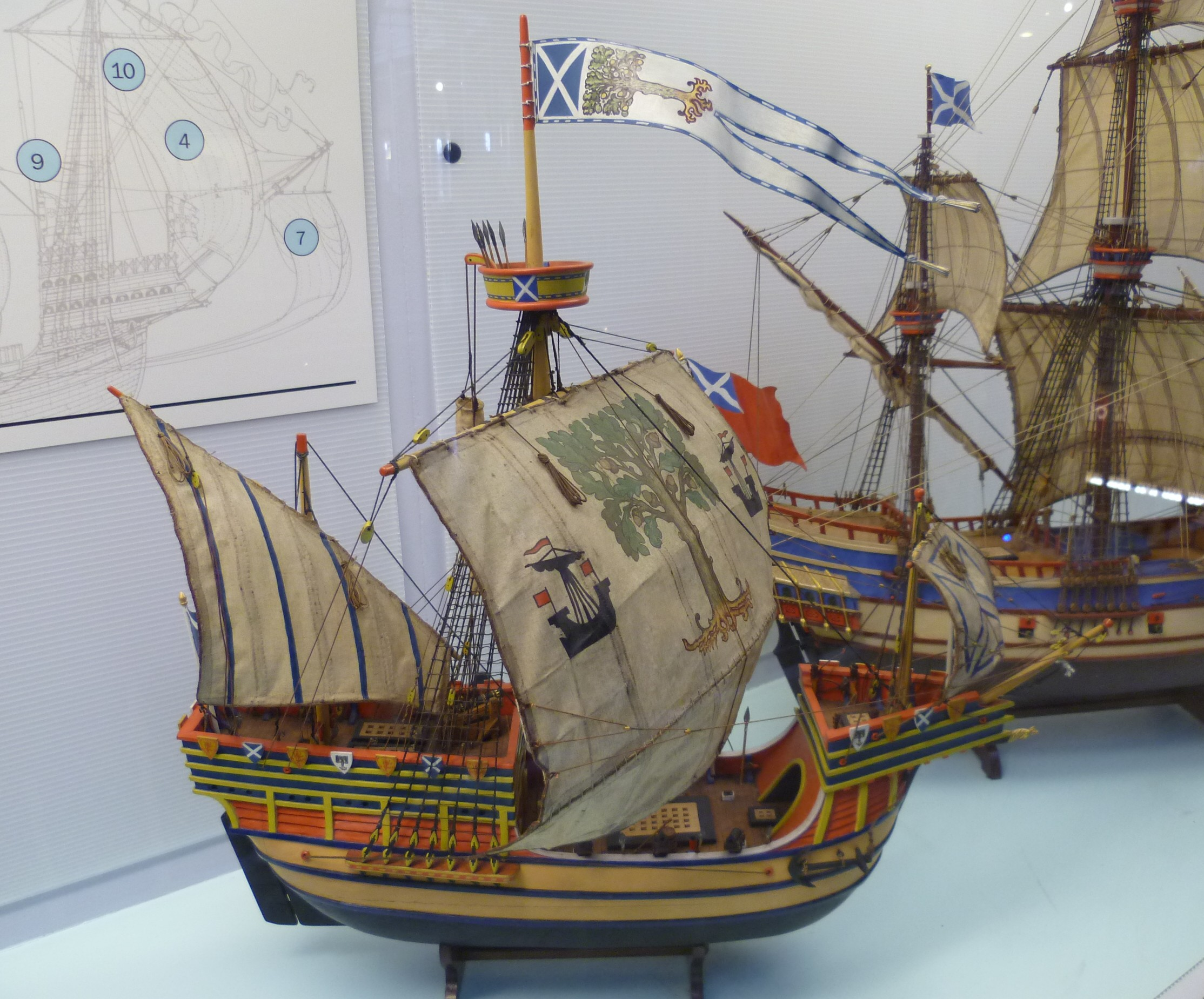
A model of the Yellow Carvel in the National Museum of Scotland

Andrew Wood's naval exploits feature in the chronicle of Robert Lindsay of Pitscottie which credits his family as one of its sources.

Wood began his naval career as a privateer under James III (reigned 1460–1488), and flourished under James IV (reigned 1488–1513). By 1489 he was master of the king's ship the Flower and the Yellow Carvel. The Scottish ships fought and captured five English ships offshore near Dunbar. In response, the English launched a larger expedition the following year under Stephen Bull, which attacked Wood's ships in the Firth of Forth. The fight lasted two days (stopping only at night) and was watched by crowds in Edinburgh. Wood eventually triumphed, despite being outnumbered in ships and guns, and Bull's ships were captured. James IV knighted Wood following this battle, and allowed him to impress some of the captured English sailors, who later were put to work build the castle at Largo.

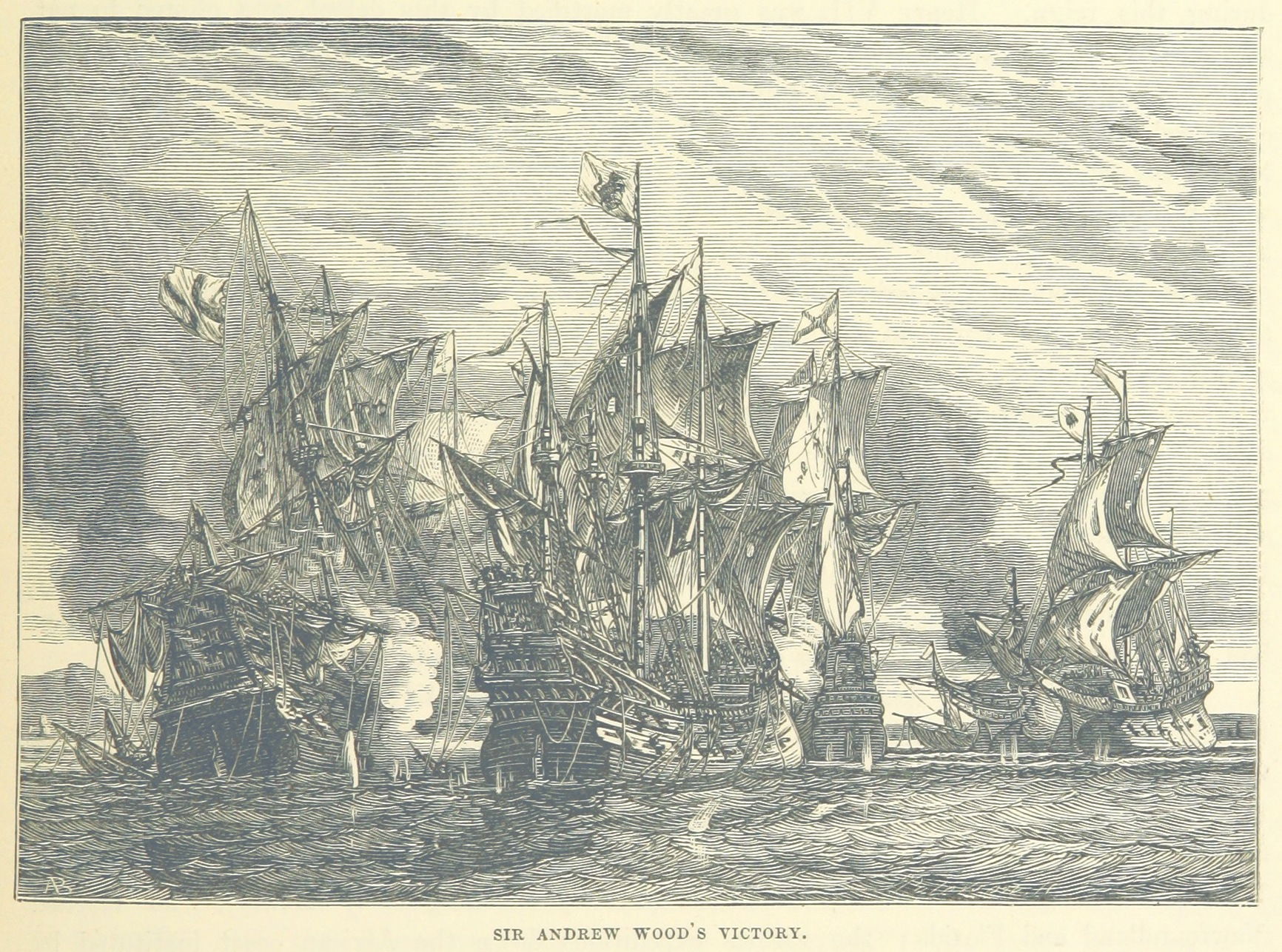
Wood's victory against Bull

Sir Andrew was the first Captain of James IV's carrack, the Great Michael, which when constructed was the largest ship in Christendom.
