= Great Michael =

Carrack or great ship of the Royal Scottish Navy

Michael
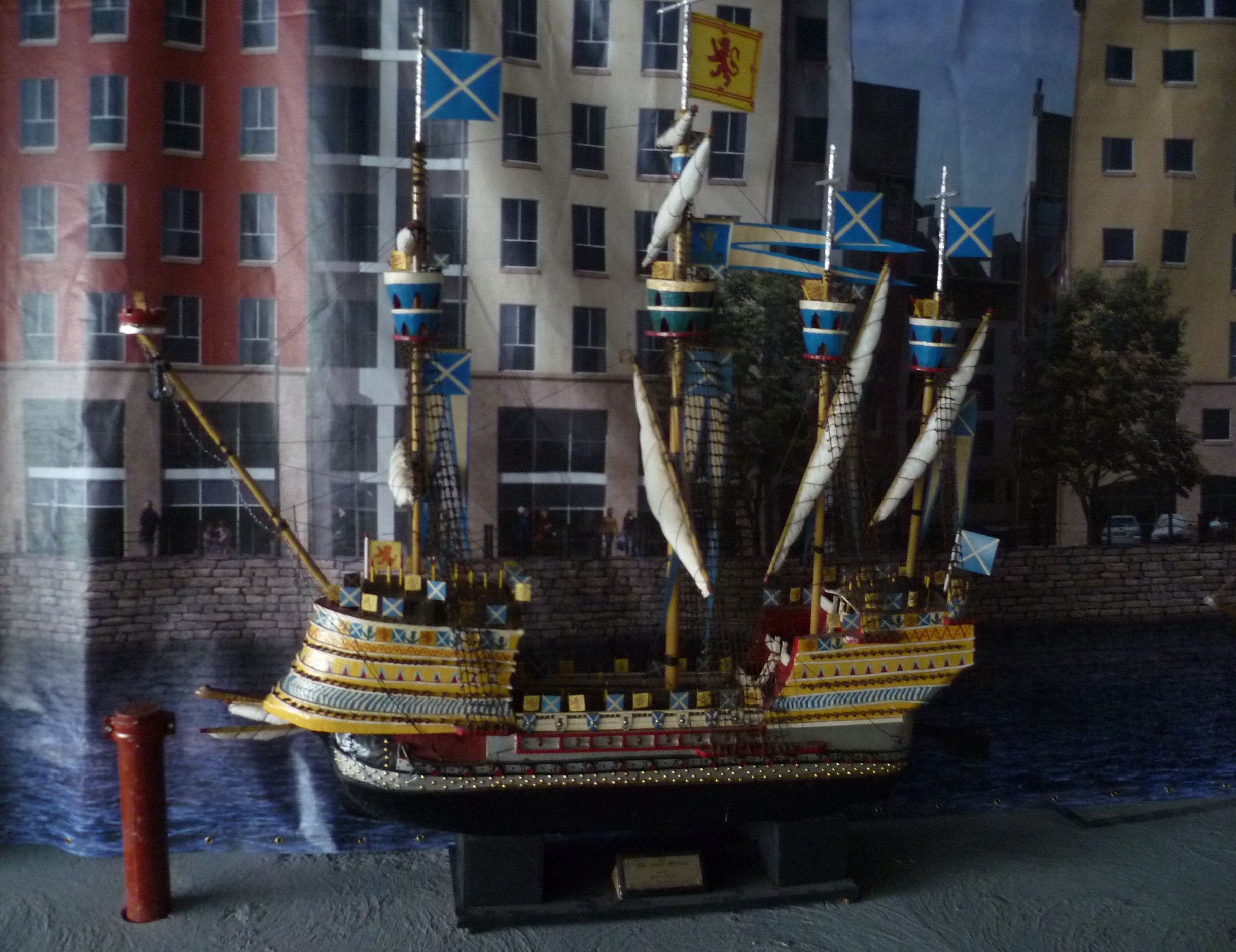
- Model of Great Michael at Ocean Terminal, Leith

History

Scotland
- Namesake: Archangel Michael
- Ordered: c.1505
- Builder: Newhaven dock
- Laid down: 1507
- Launched: 12 October 1511
- Completed: 18 February 1512
- Nickname(s): Great Michael

General characteristics
- Type: Carrack or great ship
- Tons burthen: 1000
- Length: 73.2 m (240 ft)
- Beam: 11 m (36 ft)
- Propulsion: Sails
- Complement: 1,420: 300 sailors, 120 gunners & 1000 marines
- Armament: Broadside: 24 × guns; 3 × basilisk (1 forward, 2 aft); 30 × smaller guns (later 36 main guns)
- Notes: 4 × masts; Crown Figurehead; 21 flags & Pennants; 92 arrow shields; (Note, due to different representations of the ship, it is uncertain what Michael's exact specifications were. Some of these notes are hand-counted approximations.)

Michael, popularly known as Great Michael, was a carrack or great ship of the Royal Scottish Navy. She was the largest ship built by King James IV of Scotland as part of his policy of building a strong Scottish navy.

== Name ==
Michael was named after the archangel Michael and built to support the king's unrealised project for a Scottish crusade against the Ottoman Empire to reclaim Palestine for Christendom.

== History ==
=== Construction ===
She was ordered around 1505 and laid down in 1507 under the direction of Captain Sir Andrew Wood of Largo and the master shipwright Jacques Terrell, launched on 12 October 1511 and completed on 18 February 1512. She was too large to be built at any existing Scottish dockyard, so was built at the new dock at Newhaven. When Michael was launched, she was the largest ship afloat, with twice the original displacement of her English contemporary Mary Rose, which was launched in 1509 and completed in 1510.

The poet William Dunbar wrote of her construction:

Carpentaris,
Beildaris of barkis and ballingaris,
Masounis lyand upon the land
And schipwrichtis hewand upone the strand.

— William Dunbar, "To the King [Schir, ye have mony servitouris]"

Translation from Middle Scots:

Carpenters,
Builders of barques and balingers,
Masons lying upon the land,
And shipwrights hewing upon the strand.

The chronicler Robert Lindsay of Pitscottie wrote of the building of Michael that "all the woods of Fife, except Falkland wood, besides all the timber that was got out of Norway" went into her construction. Account books show that timbers were purchased from other parts of Scotland, as well as from France and the Baltic Sea. James IV wrote to Louis XII asking for French timber for his navy, and in March 1507 wrote to officials in Rouen to ask permission for Robert Barton and George Corntoun to import Normandy timber for his ships.

Robert Lindsay gave her dimensions as 240 feet (73 m) long and 35 ft (11 m) in beam. Russell (1922) notes that Michael was supposed to have been built with oak walls 10 ft (3.0 m) thick. She displaced about 1,000 tons, had four masts, carried 24 guns (purchased from Flanders) on the broadside, 1 basilisk forward and 2 aft, and 30 smaller guns (later increased to 36 main guns), and had a crew of 300 sailors, 120 gunners, and up to 1,000 soldiers.

Henry VIII of England was unwilling to be outdone, and ordered the building of the 1000-ton Henry Grace à Dieu, launched in roughly 1512, later known as Great Harry, which was even larger. These ships were the first great ships, the precursors of the later ship of the line.

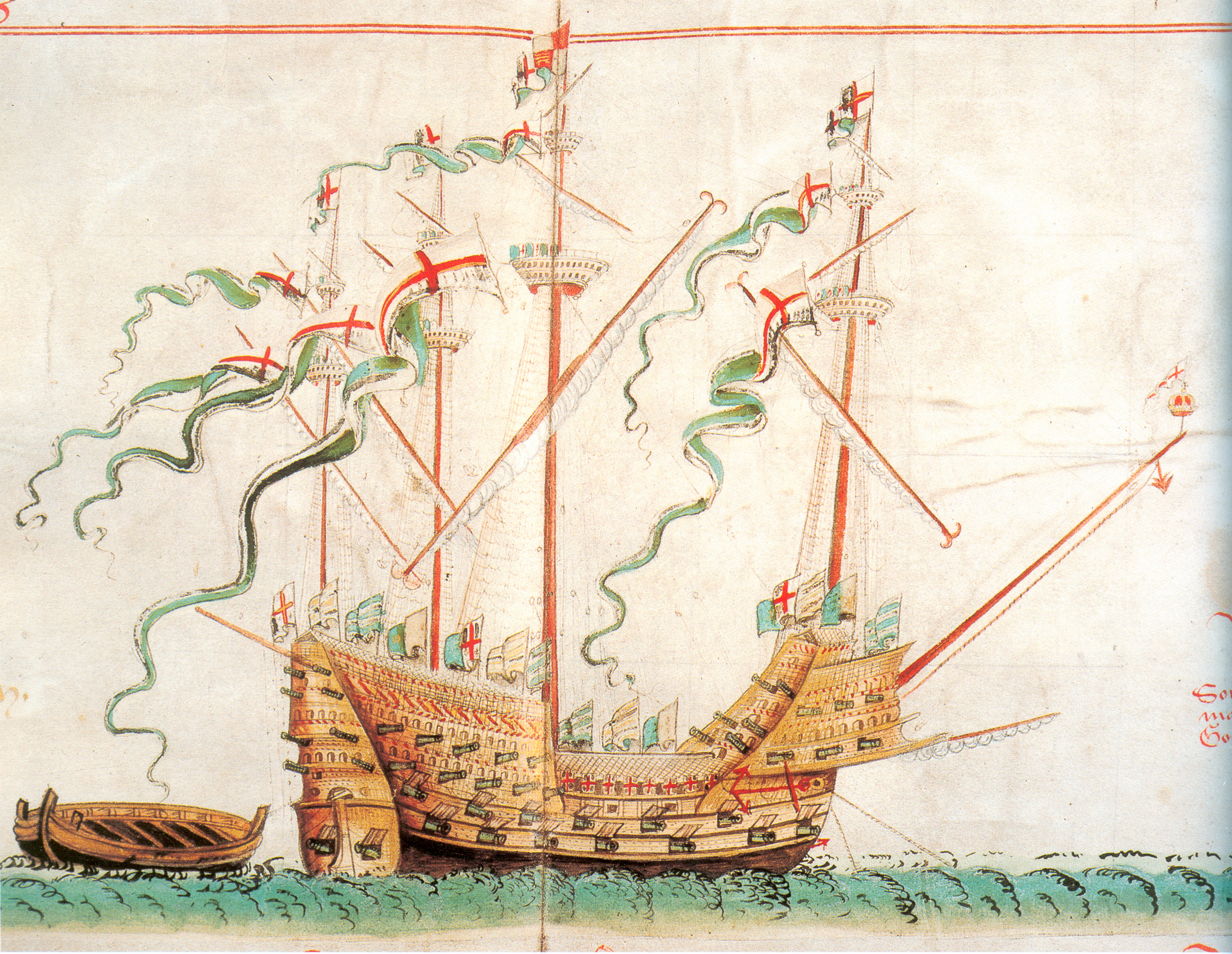
The first illustration of the first roll of the Anthony Roll, depicting the Henry Grace à Dieu, the largest ship in the English navy during the reign of King Henry VIII.

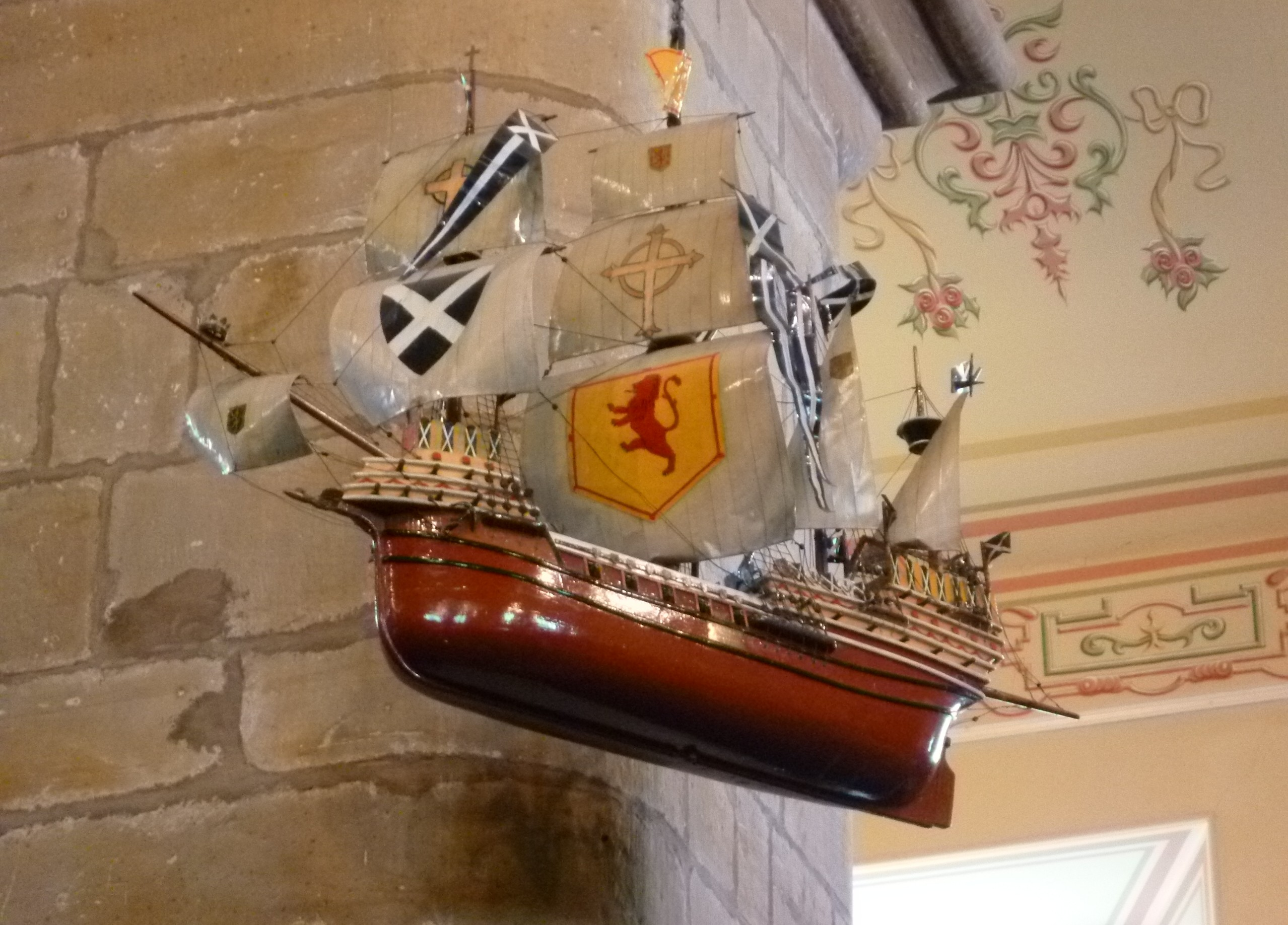
Model of Great Michael, Burntisland Kirk, Fife

=== Operational history ===
James IV and Margaret Tudor had supper on the Michael on 3 August 1512. In November 1512 the Great Michael and the Margaret were at Blackness Castle. James IV came aboard the Michael on St Andrew's day to hold an audience with the French ambassador, Charles de Tocque, sieur de la Mothe. The Auld Alliance of Scotland and France was confirmed.

The commitments of the Auld Alliance with France required Scotland to go to war with England, to divert England from her war with Louis XII of France (see the Italian Wars). In August 1513 a Scottish invasion force was assembled to attack English possessions in France. Commanded by James Hamilton, 1st Earl of Arran, the chief ships were Michael, Margaret and James. Instead of attacking the English, Arran raided Carrickfergus in Ireland and returned with loot before proceeding to France.

A warship of this size was costly to maintain, particularly for a small country such as Scotland. James IV and many of the nobility of Scotland were killed at the Battle of Flodden in September 1513. An English report of November 1513 mentions that some Scottish ships were sent to France, and the "great Ship of Scotland was run aground, but she is recovered". Regent Albany sold the Michael to Louis XII of France on 2 April 1514 for the bargain price of 40,000 livres. The Michael became known as La Grande Nef d'Ecosse (The Big Ship of Scotland).

In March 1514 Michael was reported to be docked at Honfleur because she was too big for the harbour at Dieppe. Most historians have accepted the account of the Scottish historian George Buchanan that after this, the French allowed her to rot at Brest. Norman MacDougall in 1991 suggested that under her new French name she may have taken part in the Battle of the Solent in 1545, the French attack on England that led to the sinking of the Mary Rose.

== Legacy ==
Great Michael gives her name to three streets in Newhaven: Great Michael Rise (built in 1967), Great Michael Square (the western part of Newhaven's Parliament Square, renamed in 1968) and Great Michael Close (the eastern part of the square, renamed in 1975).

== See also ==
- Peter von Danzig (ship)
- Flor de la Mar
- Peter Pomegranate
- Djong (ship)
