= Portuguese galleon São João Baptista =

Portuguese galleon

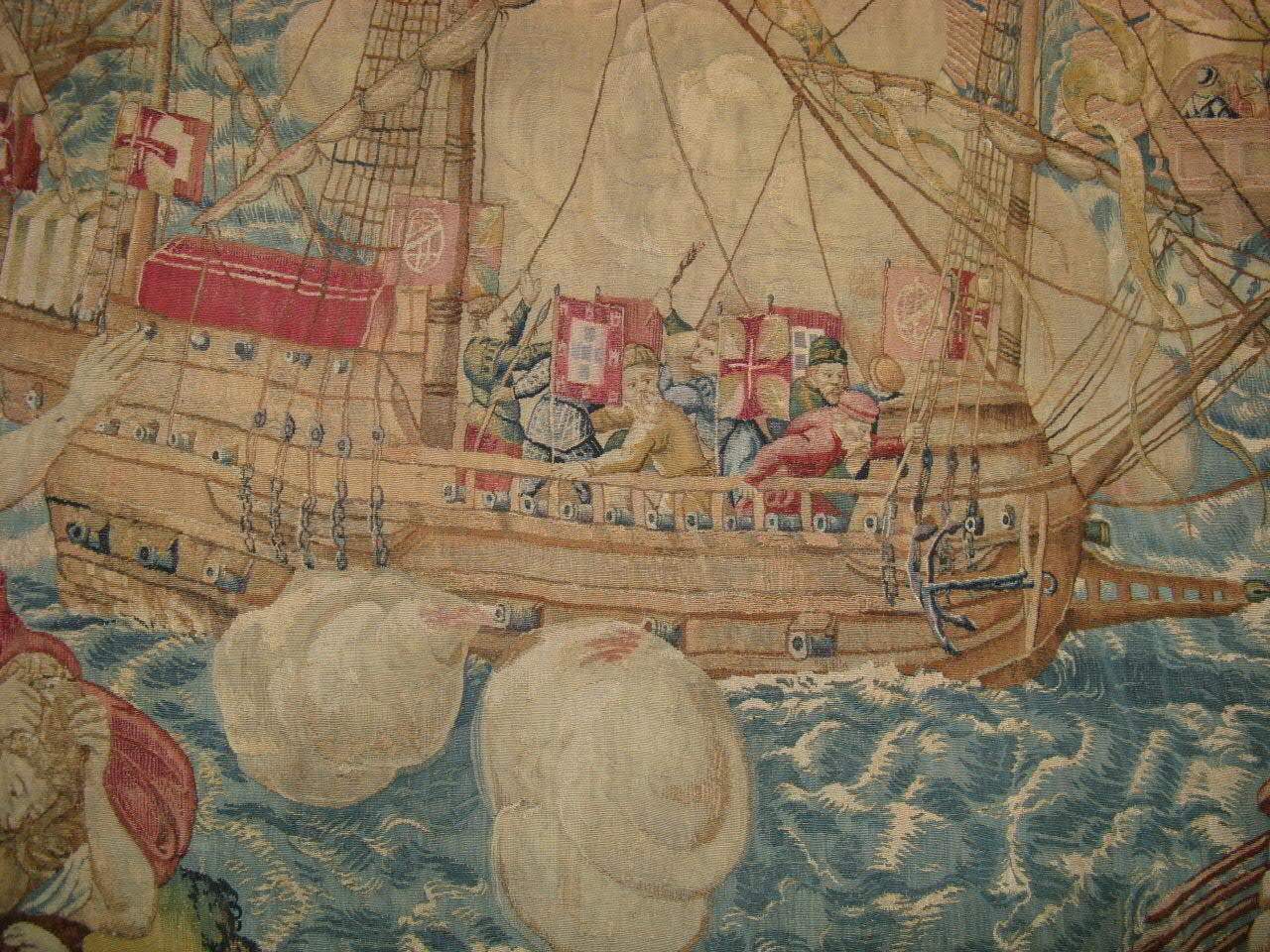
- Detail of a tapestry depicting São João Baptista

History

Portugal
- Name: São João Baptista
- Laid down: 29 August 1533
- Launched: 24 June 1534
- Out of service: 1551
- Fate: Broken up, 1551

General characteristics
- Class & type: Galleon
- Tons burthen: 1,000 tons
- Armament: 366 guns

São João Baptista (Portuguese pronunciation: [ˈsɐ̃w̃ ˈʒwɐ̃w̃ baˈtiʃ.tɐ], English: Saint John the Baptist), nicknamed "Botafogo" ("Spitfire"), was a Portuguese galleon built in the 16th century, around 1530, considered one of the biggest and most powerful Portuguese warships.

== History ==
The exact date of its construction is unknown; the oldest known references to the vessel mention the "great galleon São João" sailing in a convoy to Guinea, under the command of Duarte Coelho in 1532, but it could be simply a galleon with the same name.

Friar Manuel Homem says that this galleon mounted 366 bronze pieces of artillery, including the ones that garrisoned the high castles of stern and bow. The pamphlet attributed to Doctor Jorge Coelho, which appears to have been written during the reign of King John III of Portugal, says that the galleon was built in Portas do Mar in Lisbon, by Master João Galego, father of Pedro Galego, being laid down on 29 August 1533 and 230 workers were employed in its construction, of which 30 worked on it daily, and launched on 24 June 1534. It also says that its keel had the length and a half of the largest carrack of India, and that it had five gun decks, with the same number of 366 guns.

The oldest known estimates regarding its armament range from 80 to 200 guns, including a large chase gun. It was among the earliest recorded vessels to have gun ports with lids, which were opened to expose the cannon as a show of firepower.

In 1533, King John III pondered sending the great vessel to Goa, the capital of Portuguese India, so as to reinforce the firepower of Portuguese fleets that operated in the Indian Ocean against the galleys, dhows, and junks of Asia, but Duarte Coelho advised him against it.

=== Capture of Tunis ===
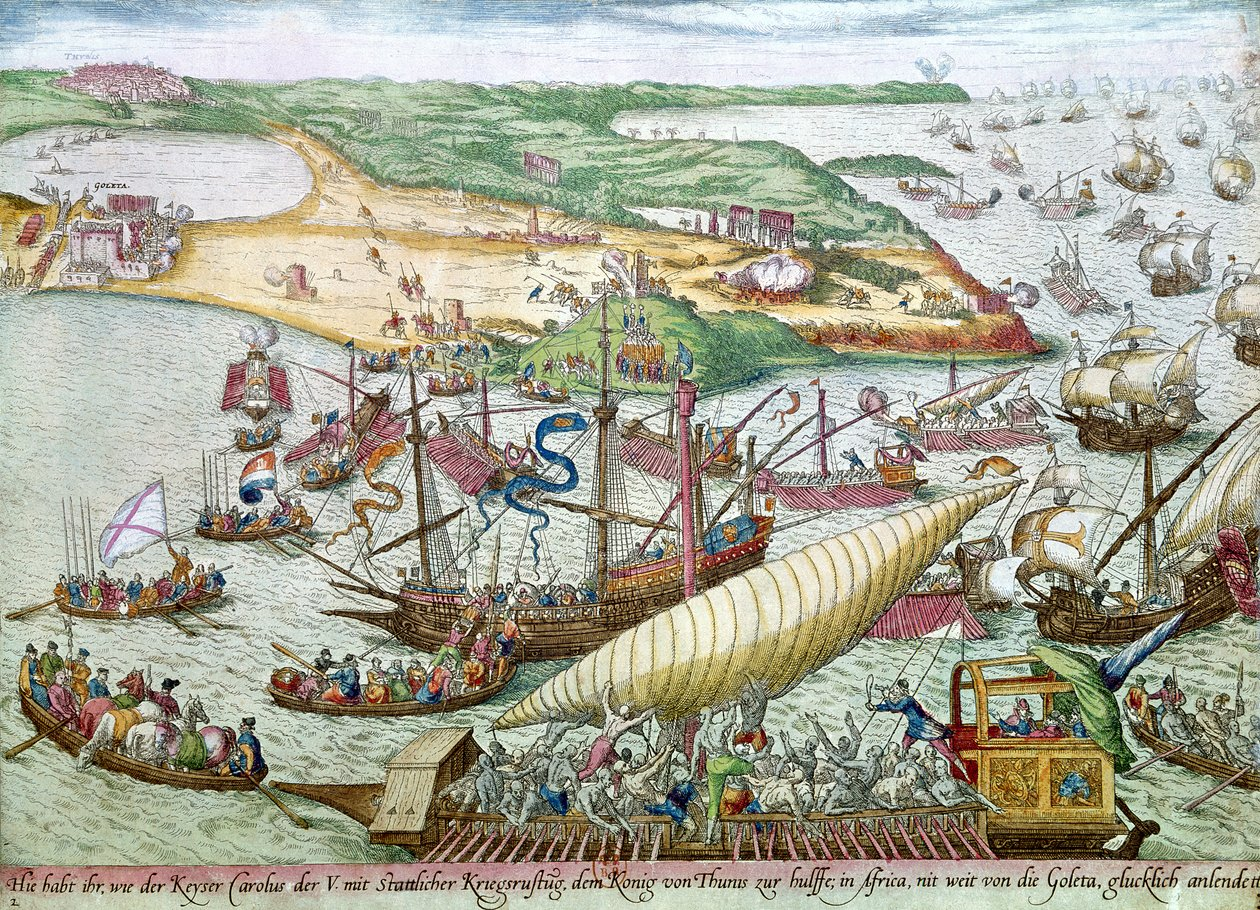
A 16th-century tapestry depicting São João Baptista and the rest of the Christian fleet heading to Goletta

São João Baptista most famously distinguished itself during the Conquest of Tunis (1535), when it bombarded La Goletta fortress.

Besides São João Baptista itself, a further 20 war caravels and 2 carracks, bearing a total of 1,500 men (of which 515 were soldiers and 230 were artillery gunners) made up the Portuguese expedition. The entire fleet carried 598 guns in total, most of them small caliber (1 basilisco, 2 leões, 3 águias, 19 camelos, 21 esperas, 52 pedreiros, 150 falcões, 350 berços). Its captain was António de Saldanha, with Infante Luís, Duke of Beja, brother of John III, and brother-in-law of Charles V being in overall command of the expeditionary corps, the galleon being his flagship.

Emperor Charles V visited the galleon personally, and marveled at its construction quality and armaments, while Andrea Doria also inspected the vessel on the occasion and regarded it favorably for its strength and orderliness.

=== Decommissioning ===
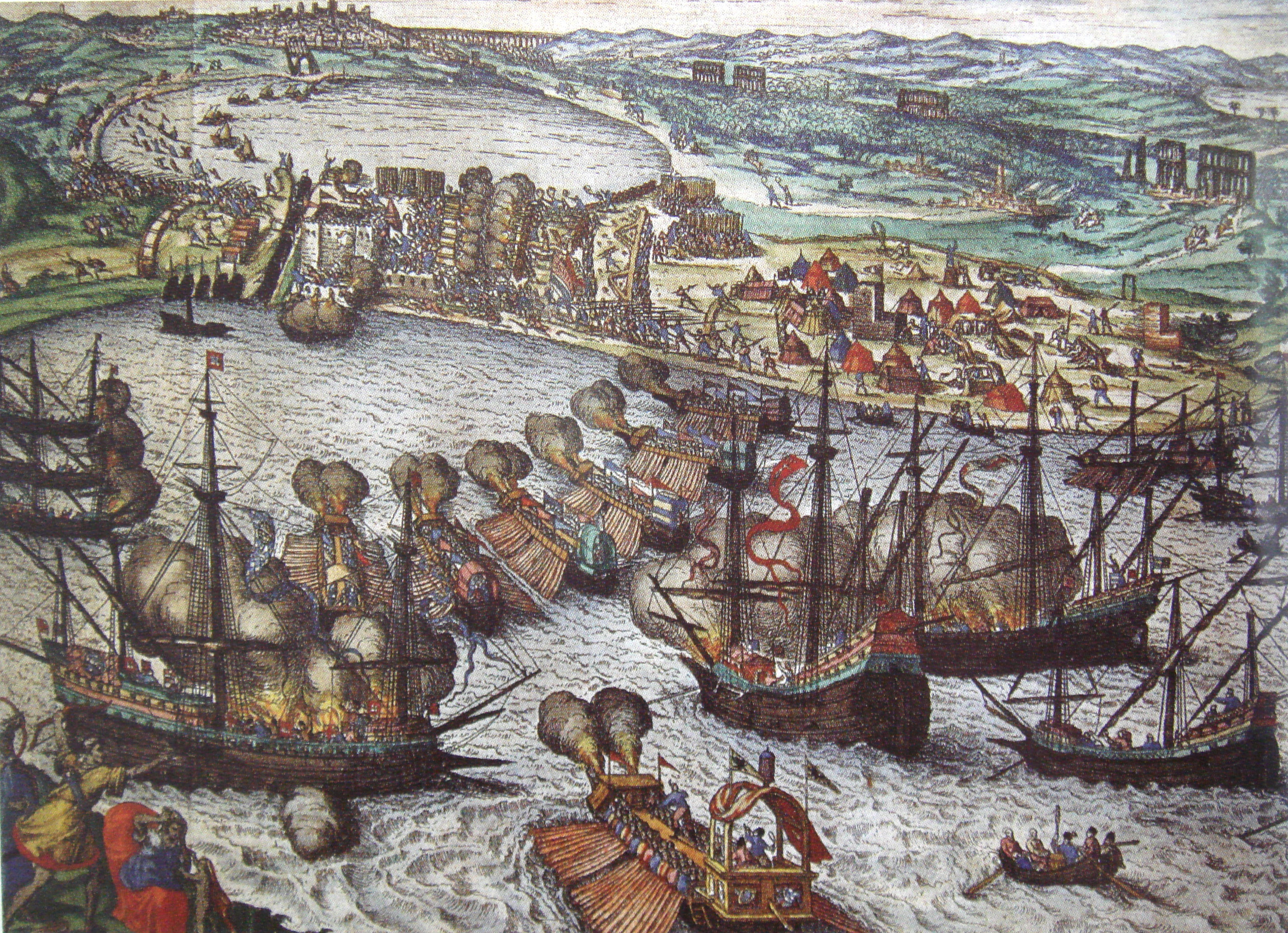
São João Baptista (on the left of the image), opening fire in the conquest of Tunis

In 1550, the by then "old and very famous galleon São João was dispatched to Brazil", along with a convoy of several merchant ships with supplies, in the aid of the nascent colony and city of Salvador, and the following year, it was dismantled in Pernambuco, its iron parts and ammunition salvaged by the colonists, according to a report by governor Tomé de Sousa to King John III.

== Botafogo in Rio de Janeiro ==
One member of the crew named João de Sousa Pereira Botafogo, a nobleman from the city of Elvas, became famous because he was the master gunner responsible for the ship's artillery batteries, earning the nickname "botafogo" ("kindler"), which he later added to his family name. Later, he went to live in the Portuguese colony of Brazil, fighting against the French and the local Tupi Indians. As a reward, the Portuguese Crown granted him some lands known today as Botafogo.

== See also ==
- Flor de la Mar
- Great Michael
- Mary Rose
- Peter Pomegranate
- Santa Anna (1522 ship)

== Bibliography ==
- Batalhas e Combates da Marinha Portuguesa, Vol. II, pages 243/245 – from Saturnino Monteiro. Livraria Sá da Costa, 1st edition, 1991.
- Nobreza de Portugal e do Brasil – Vol. I, pages 382/384. Published by Zairol Lda., Lisbon 1989.
- O Galeão S. João (c. 1530-1551). Dados para uma monografia, José Virgílio Pissarra, in Fernando Oliveira e o Seu Tempo - Humanismo e Arte de Navegar no Renascimento Europeu (1450-1650), Cascais 1999.
