= Peter Pomegranate =

Tudor warship

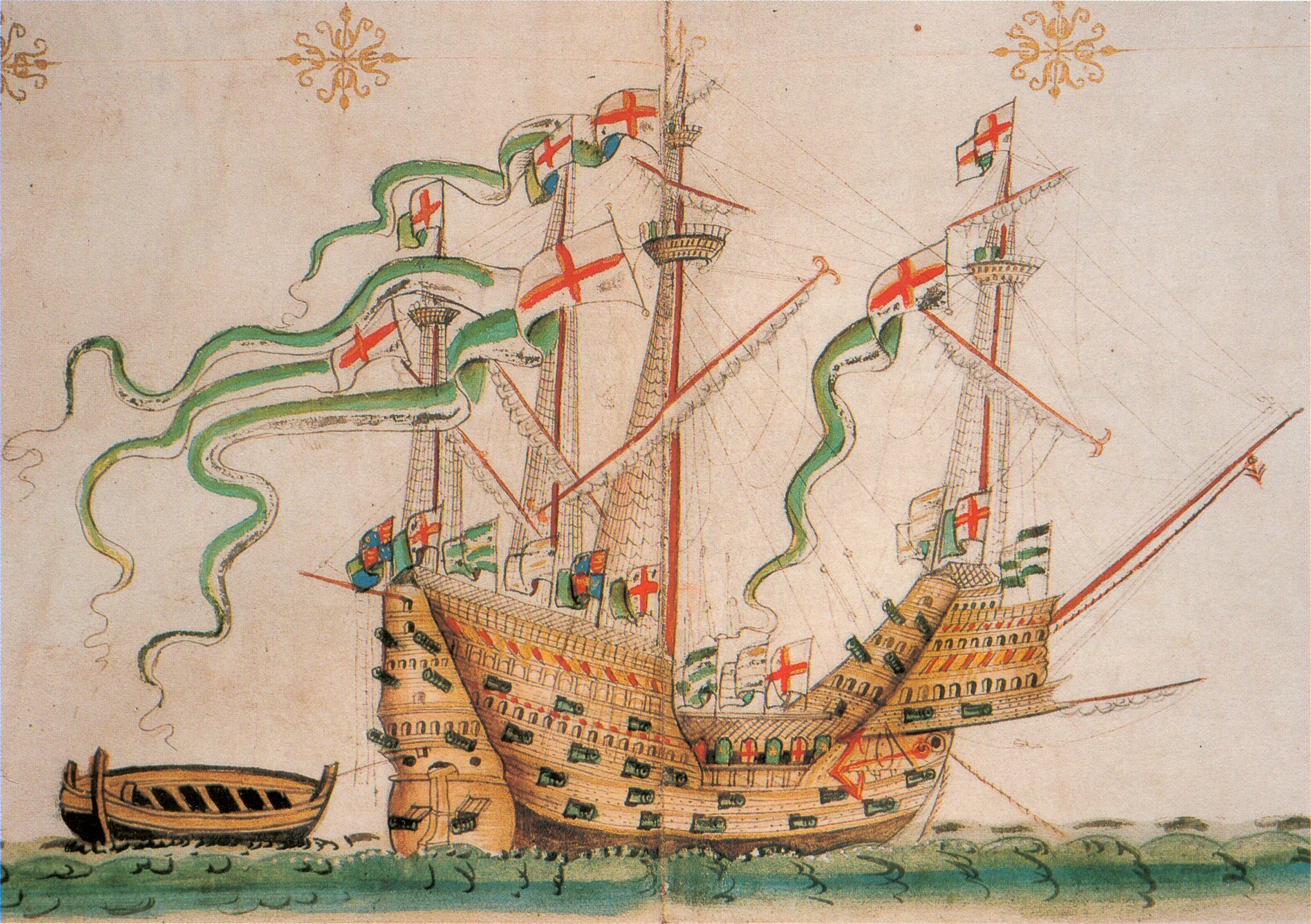
- Peter Pomegranate as depicted in the Anthony Roll.

History

England
- Name: Peter Pomegranate (from 1536 Peter)
- Builder: Portsmouth
- Launched: 1510
- Commissioned: 1510
- Refit: rebuilt and enlarged 1536
- Honours and awards: Battle of St. Mathieu; Battle of Pinkie (naval bombardment)
- Fate: Unknown, last mentioned in 1558

General characteristics
- Tons burthen: 600
- Complement: 185 soldiers, 185 sailors, 30 gunners
- Armament: 36 cannons, 66 swivel guns

Peter Pomegranate was a warship of the English Tudor navy, built in 1510. Her name most likely was in honour of Saint Peter and the badge of Queen Catherine of Aragon, a pomegranate.

== History ==
She had a tonnage of 400 or 450 when first built. In 1536 she was rebuilt and enlarged to a tonnage of 600. At that date the name was shortened to Peter (Catherine had fallen out of grace; she died in 1536). The ship's fate is not recorded, but she was last mentioned in records in 1558. Peter Pomegranate was a contemporary of the Mary Rose and, commanded by John Clere, took part in the Battle of the Solent on 19 July 1545 when the Mary Rose was lost.

Named in full in the roster as "Peter Pomgarnarde", she joined Edward Clinton's invasion fleet against Scotland in August 1547. According to an inventory of 1547, the rebuilt Peter had 185 sailors, 185 soldiers, and 30 gunners. Her armaments included; 2 brass demi-cannons; 2 brass culverins; 4 brass demi-culverins; 4 brass sakers; an iron culverin; 3 iron sakers; 9 iron port pieces; 37 iron bases; and 11 hagbuts. There were also 259 yew bows, 160 bills; and 160 Moorish pikes.

== See also ==
- Flor de la Mar
- Jong (ship)
- Great Michael
- Mary Rose
- São João Baptista (galleon)
