= Scottish warship Margaret =

Margaret
History

Scotland
- Namesake: Margaret Tudor
- Launched: c.1505

Margaret was a Scottish warship of the 16th century.

She was built at Leith around 1505 by order of King James IV of Scotland, as part of his policy of building a strong Scottish navy. He named her after his new wife, Margaret Tudor. Records of shipbuilding between 1502 and June 1506 appear to refer to her construction; two French master shipwrights John Lorans and Jennen Diew were among the workforce. Some of Andrew Barton's sailors were employed watching the works. James IV held a banquet aboard the partly built vessel on 25 May 1505, bringing tapestry and silverware from Holyrood Palace.

At the time she was built she was considerably larger than any other ship in the Scottish navy, but soon after she was superseded by a warship which was considerably larger again, the Michael. As her maiden voyage, she took James IV to the Isle of May in July 1506. New equipment included nine crossbows, 6 compasses, and two night glasses.

James IV ordered himself a special gold whistle, and bought another made of silver. The ship had a blue banner with the white saltire, and a yellow flag with the red lion of Scotland embroidered in gold and silk by a Flemishman called Nannik (Nanynek Dierxsoun). Special Flemish cloth for the banners and streamers was ordered from an Italian merchant Jerome Frescobaldi. The blue cloth of the saltire also formed the background of the lion's tongue and claws; "ane blew steik of sey to the banar for the schip with Sanct Androis cors in the myddis" and other coloured cloths for the "toungis and clukis for the Lioun in the banar."

The Margaret was repaired at Airth in 1512. In November 1512 the Great Michael and the Margaret were at Blackness. James IV came aboard the Michael on St Andrew's day to hold an audience with the French ambassador, Charles de Tocque, sieur de la Mothe. The Auld Alliance of Scotland and France was confirmed.

In the Spring of 1513, Margaret was refitted to be loaned to Louis XII of France. The English ambassador, Nicholas West described her preparation on 13 April 1513;

On Monday, I went to the New Haven, and ther lyeth the Margaret, a ship nighe of the burden of the Cryst of Lynn, and many men workying upon her, som setting on her mayn top, and som caulking her above water, for under water she was new tallowed.

John, Lord Fleming, was Vice-Admiral on Margaret, second to the Earl of Arran, Lord Admiral on Michael. First the fleet burnt Carrickfergus and waited off Ayr before going to France. Robert Lindsay of Pitscottie believed that the fleet's delay provoked James IV to invade England. Margaret was berthed at Dumbarton on her return with the Duke of Albany on 26 May 1515, after service in France. In July 1515, she was in the keeping of John Stewart of Ardgowan, with James. New docks were built for the two ships in September. Their guns were unloaded under the direction of Gavin Jardane and John Drummond, master-wright, and transported from Glasgow to Edinburgh.
