= Robert Barton of Over Barnton =

Scottish landowner, politician (died 1540)

Robert Barton of Over Barnton (died 1540) was a Scottish landowner, merchant, sailor and politician. He served as Comptroller, Master of the Mint and Lord High Treasurer to James V of Scotland.

== Sailor and shipowner ==
Robert Barton was the son of John Barton the sailor. He took Perkin Warbeck away from Scotland in the Cuckoo in July 1497. His usual business was exporting goods to Flanders and importing into Scotland, items bought by the King James IV included blue damask cloth, and timber for the ceiling of the chapel at Holyroodhouse in 1504. In February 1506 he was paid for buying a ship in France for James, which seems to have been the Lion. His crew and ship were hired by the king in July 1506. Robert also went to Dumbarton to assist with construction of another ship there. The Barton brothers had a letter of Marque, originally granted to their father in 1485, which gave them legal protection in Scotland to prey on Portuguese shipping.

In March 1507, James IV wrote to officials in Rouen to ask permission for Robert Barton and George Corntoun to import timber from Normandy for his ships.

By 1507 Robert was wealthy enough to buy the estate of Barnton from William Dundas of Dundas. His brother Andrew Barton was captured and executed by the English in 1511. John Barton died at Kirkcudbright in 1513 after taking ships of the Royal Scots Navy to France. In 1519, a ship of Robert's, the Black Barque was captured by Spanish sailors near Yarmouth and the crew abandoned on the English coast.

In 1524 Robert and David Falconer agreed to provide a task-force for Christian II of Denmark. Frederick I of Denmark wrote to the Duke of Albany about their activities in January 1529. As late as February 1536, Christian III of Denmark wrote to James V asking for the service of his famous captains, Robert Barton and Robert Fogo. By this time Robert was an old man.

== In the royal exchequer ==
Robert Barton was well-educated and pursued a second land-based career as a financial officer to the Scottish crown. He was comptroller from 1516 to 1525, and treasurer, comptroller and master of the mint in 1529. In 1524 an English diplomat Thomas Magnus noted that Robert was an especial friend of Margaret Tudor. Magnus had been given a copy of a letter from John Stewart, Duke of Albany, Margaret's rival for power, giving Barton instructions on provisions for Dunbar Castle, which he believed to be a forgery. In English letters Robert's name regularly appears as "Hob a Barton."

In 1532 he was required to pay the wages of the royal gunner, Henry Borthwick, who had been killed at the siege of Tantallon Castle, to his children. Barton was treasurer again in 1534. In 1536 James V prepared for Robert to accompany him on his trip to France. The King granted Robert exemption from any legal actions during their absence. Robert, wrote James, was 'of gret age, febill, and waik in persoune.'

Robert Barton died in 1540. James V had confirmed him as the owner of several estates, and in April 1538 created a free-barony of Over Barnton. The gift narrated;

"his great services to the navy in time of war for the defence of Scots lieges and merchants against the English and other pirates, occasionally bringing himself into great expense, and other praiseworthy acts in the time of James IV and himself in his minority, as a comptroller and treasurer.
largis sumptibus naves tempore guerre pro liegiorum et marcatorum suorum contra Anglos et alios piratos defensione, ejus personam quibusvis temporibus necessariis periculis exponendo: et pro aliis laudabilibus actis patri suo et sibbi in minori sua etate factis in thesaurarie et compotorum rotulatoris officiis."

His first wife was Elizabeth Jameson. Their eldest son was John Barton of Duddingston who married Janet Littill. He second wife was Elizabeth Crawford. His other sons included James and Harry, who were awarded a royal pension for their education as clergy on 20 April 1541. Robert's heir, a son of Elizabeth Crawford, also a 'Robert', changed his name to Moubray when he married an heiress, Barbara Moubray of Barnebougall, in 1527. A daughter, Margaret married John Sandilands of Calder.
