= Thomas Erskine of Haltoun =

Sir Thomas Erskine of Haltoun and Brechin was the royal secretary to James V of Scotland from 1524.

== Family ==
A royal charter of 8 February 1543 noted Thomas as the uncle of the reformer John Erskine of Dun, who was married to a French lady-in waiting of Mary of Guise, Barbara Berlay. Thomas's sister Isabella married James Cramond of Auldbar by 1527.

Thomas Erskine married Elizabeth Scrymgeour. Their son, Thomas, (later styled younger of Haltoun), was married to Agnes Ogilvy by 1541. He had license to travel abroad in April 1542, with his cousin John Erskine of Dun, and John Lamby of Duncany.

== Career ==
He was first appointed secretary by Margaret Tudor and James Hamilton, 1st Earl of Arran in 1524. In September 1526 he was made a gentleman and squire in the king's household. He was allowed food for himself, three horses, and two servants.

In Spring 1531, Erskine was sent to Rome. Amongst other business, he may have brought a request that James V would be allowed to tax the church in Scotland. The money was intended for the defence of Scotland.

As a reward for his services at home and abroad, in August 1531 Thomas was given the important task of keeping, repairing, and garrisoning Tantallon Castle, which James V of Scotland had obtained from the exiled Earl of Angus. He was at Tantallon in July 1533. As a further reward for his services he was granted the lands and lordship of Brechin and Navar on 4 February 1534. He had been the chamberlain of these lands since 1527. The charter described him as Sir Thomas Erskine of Kirkbuddo. Some of the yearly fees due to the crown for these lands were used for the wages of the garrison of Stirling Castle.

It has been suggested that Erskine was a founder of the College of Justice, and he may have been educated at Pavia. Later he came under the king's suspicion for communicating with the banished Douglas family. He signed an audit of an account of royal income in 1538. Erskine witnessed King James's will on the Salamander at Leith on 12 June 1540 before his voyage to Orkney and the Western Isles. In 1548, Erskine travelled to mainland Europe to rescue one of his sons from captivity.

== Royal wedding planner ==
James V was destined for a French marriage by the Treaty of Rouen of 1517, which aimed to secure the Auld Alliance. Erskine travelled to France, Rome, and England regarding James's marriage, notionally to Madeleine of Valois daughter of Francis I of France Erskine was sent to France as a diplomat to contract this marriage in April 1530. He was joined in this commission with John Stewart, Duke of Albany. However, at this time James V's advisors and the Duke of Albany hoped to gain political advantage by contracting the King's marriage to Catherine de' Medici the young Duchess of Urbino. On his way to Rome to meet Albany in December 1531 to further the Urbino marriage with Pope Clement VI, Erskine was shipwrecked on the French coast. When Erskine arrived in Rome in the spring of 1531 he dined with the Spanish ambassador Mai, who may have been a fellow student at Pavia. Erskine's instructions may have included asking Albany to press Clement VI to allow James V to tax the church in Scotland. The historian Robert Kerr Hannay argued that the resultant 'tax of the three teinds' was part of the process of the formation of the College of Justice.

The marriage plan changed, and in February 1533, two French ambassadors, William du Bellay, sieur de Langes and Etienne de Laigue, sieur de Beauvais, who had just been in Scotland, told the Venetian ambassador in London that James was thinking of marrying Christina of Denmark.

Two years later, Erskine was in France with David Beaton still trying to secure the King's marriage to Princess Madeleine. He had letters of recommendation from James V to Eleanor of France, the Queen of Navarre, Madame Aubigny and Robert Stuart, sieur d'Aubigny, the Chancellor Antoine Duprat Cardinal of Sens, the Admiral Philippe de Chabot, the Grand Master Anne de Montmorency, and the French Secretary Jean le Breton, sieur de Villandry. Erskine and Beaton were instructed to arrange for Madeleine to come to Scotland next summer, when she was fourteen, or in July 1535.

Initially, Francis I organised a substitute bride: Erskine was at Cremieu on 6 March 1536 when the contract was made for James V to marry Mary of Bourbon, daughter of the Duke of Vendôme.
