= Murdo MacKenzie (courtier) =

Murdo Mackenzie: Scottish Builder

Murdo or Murdoch Mackenzie, also known as Murdo McRorie (died 1590) was a Scottish courtier and the builder of Fairburn Tower near Inverness.

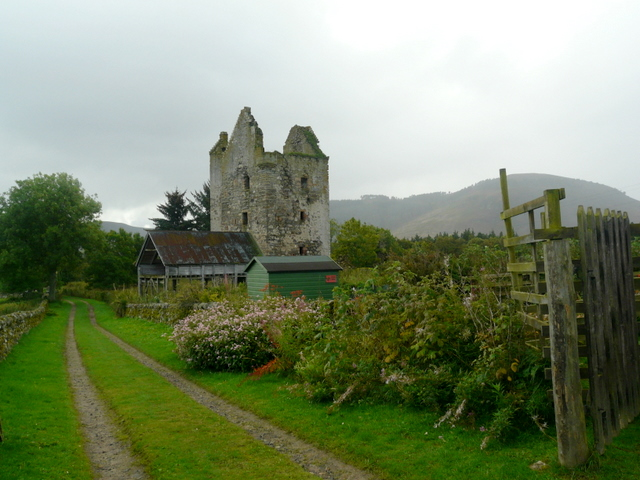
Fairburn Tower before restoration

== Career ==
He was a son of Roderick (Rory) Mackenzie of Achilty, and probably a nephew of John Mackenzie of Kintail. His mother is said to have been a daughter of Duncan McWilliam Dow vic Leod.

Murdo Mackenzie became a courtier, a groom or valet of the bedchamber for James V of Scotland from 1538. It is said that Murdo was sent to join the royal household after his father, who had been a prisoner on the Bass, impressed the king in a wrestling match with an Italian fighter. Murdo was declared legitimate for legal purposes, inheritance and property ownership, in July 1539.

Murdo Mackenzie is mentioned several times in the records of the Scottish Exchequer. He was a companion of the king in 1540 at Stirling Castle, Falkland Palace, and Dudhope Castle. On 30 April 1540 the king's pursemaster John Tennent gave MacKenzie 22 shillings to buy gunpowder in Dundee for the king's handguns. Mackenzie, and three other grooms of the chamber, Alexander Kemp, Sandy Whitelaw, and Andrew Drummond, were given money for livery clothes in 1540, and their clothing allowance was increased. In June 1542 Mackenzie was given a gift of a "composition" of the lands of Overwood worth £113.

Clothes given to Murdo MacKenzie to wear on duty with the king included a doublet of "tanny" (orange brown) velvet. It is said that Mackenzie was not at court when James V died at Falkland Palace in December 1542, and if he had been, he would have received a good legacy intended for him.

== Fairburn Tower and its lands ==
Murdo Mackenzie was granted the lands of Fairburn near Inverness and other farms on 1 April 1542. For the hearths of each homestead on the estate he was to pay the feudal duty of a hen, called a "reik hen." He was instructed to build a new house, Fairburn, with orchards and a garden. After he married Mariobelle or Margaret Urquhart, in 1549 Mary, Queen of Scots gave him more land in the parish. A translation of Mackenzie's charter is given in the Origines Parochiales. Murdo Mackenzie died on 20 December 1590 and wished to be buried with his forebears in Beauly Priory.

== Marriages and children ==
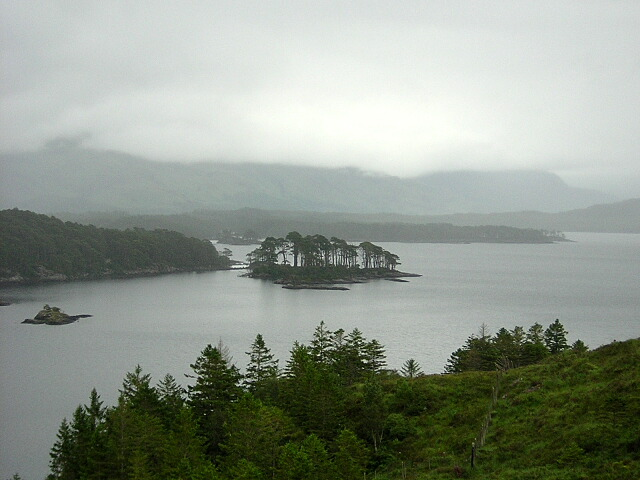
Isobel MacKenzie lived on Eilean Ruairidh Beag on Loch Maree

His first wife, Margaret Urquhart, was a daughter of the Sheriff of Cromarty. Their children included:

- Alexander MacKenzie of Fairburn, who married a daughter of Walter Innes of Innerbreakie.
- John MacKenzie of Towie or Tolly (died 1601), kirk minister of Dingwall, who brought the Laird of Glengarry to justice for the Applecross murders
- A daughter who married Ross of Priesthill
- Annabella MacKenzie, who married (1) Thomas MacKenzie of Lochluichart and Ord (a son of Kenneth MacKenzie of Killichrist), and (2) Alexander MacKenzie.

His second wife was a daughter of Rorie McFarquhar. Their children included:

- Rory MacKenzie of Knockbackster or Knockbaxter
- Hector MacKenzie, Chamberlain of Lochcarron
- John MacKenzie of Corry
- Isobel Mackenzie, who married John MacKenzie, a son of John MacKenzie of Gairloch. He was also known as John Roy Mackenzie and had a house on the smaller Eilean Ruaridh on Loch Maree.
