= Robert Fichepain =

Robert or Robin Fichepain was a French merchant who worked for Francis I of France and Henry II of France, primarily supplying fabrics. Several records of fabrics he supplied to the Scottish court survive.

== Career ==
Fichepain's family was from Tours where he served his apprenticeship as a merchant. He was probably a relation of Jeanne Boucault, wife of the painter Jean Clouet, and a daughter of Martine Fichepain and a Tours goldsmith Gatien Boucault. She was a daughter of the armourer Thomas Fichepain of Tours and a cousin of Jean Fichepain, usher of the royal treasury.

In March 1525, Fichepain and René Tardif supplied fabrics for the funeral of Louis II de la Trémoille.

By June 1536, Fichepain and his colleagues, the brothers Jean and René Tardif, were merchants of the "argenterie", working directly for the French court and following its progresses. Marie Tardif was the wife of another merchant from Tours, Jacque Delafons. Delafons supplied silks and cloth of gold and silver to Marguerite de Navarre for the wedding of Jeanne d'Albret in 1541.

In January 1537, Tardif and Fichepain supplied silks and woollen fabrics to James V for his wedding to Madeleine of Valois. James V bought red velvet, satin, and taffeta at Blois ahead of his entry to Paris for a gown, doublet, and "hugtoun". The Scottish records names the merchant as "Robert Fischpen". Tardif was paid 13,256 livre tournois for supplying fabrics to dress the women of the French court, of the households of the queen Eleanor of Austria, the dauphine Catherine de' Medici, and Margaret of Valois, Duchess of Berry in 1539 and 1540.

In 1548, Mary of Guise, the widow of James V, asked her envoy Henri Cleutin to buy cloth of gold for a gown for Mary, Queen of Scots, from René Tardif and Robert Fichepain. Pierre de la Lande made dresses or gowns for Mary in France. Mary of Guise had married James V as a "daughter of France", fulfilling the Treaty of Rouen (1517), and so bought her clothing fabrics from the French royal argenterie merchants.

On 1 April 1549, Fichepain wrote a letter to Mary of Guise recommending an apothecary or herbalist, René Balezay from Tours, who hoped to work for her in Scotland or in France. Balezay was married to a daughter of Fichepain's master, the merchant with whom he had served his apprenticeship. Fichepain was at the French court and had seen Mary, Queen of Scots, at Saint-Germain-en-Laye.

Mary of Guise visited France in 1550, and bought fabrics and clothes for herself and for Mary, Queen of Scots, from the merchants of the argenterie, Fichepain and René Tardif and Pierre Gaillard or Gallant. The transaction was overseen by the French treasurer. The schedule of purchases survives in duplicate in the National Library of Scotland. Prices were not recorded, the items listed include cloth bought for gifts of clothing, for farthingales, for the costumes of fools and for ladies in waiting.

In France, in 1551, René Tardif supplied velvet, satin, taffeta, and Holland linen to Mary, Queen of Scots. His business partner and relation Claude Fichepain received the payment. Jean Tardif (the younger) became a magistrate or eschevin of Tours and his family was ennobled. Robert Fichepain was mayor of Tours in 1556/1557, and the proprietor of an estate, La Goujonnière or Goguerie.
