= John Tennent (courtier) =

Servant of King James V of Scotland

John Tennent or Tennand of Listonshiels (died c. 1549) was a servant and companion of King James V of Scotland. He was a keeper of the royal wardrobe and the Honours of Scotland. He kept an account of the king's daily expenses which is an important source document for the Scottish royal court.

== Life at court ==
Tennent's first court position in 1527 was as a valet or varlet of the king's chamber. He was given livery clothes as a servant in the king's chamber in 1529. In 1529 he was also bearer of the crossbow. He became pursemaster and yeoman of the wardrobe in 1537. He was appointed keeper of the palace and park of Holyroodhouse in November 1540.

=== Pursemaster ===
As pursemaster he daily accompanied the king, paying his small debts and handing over the sums the king gave in alms or as tips (known as drinksilver) to workmen and beggars. He gave money to James V when he played cards with Mary of Guise. Royal servants received rewards, including the valet Murdo Mackenzie and the nurse of the king's daughter Lady Jean Stewart. Rewards from the purse were given to servants of nobles who sent food gifts to James V. A servant of Margaret Tudor, Thomas Robson's wife, who brought capons to Stirling Castle was given 22 shillings.

Tennent and the other pursemasters were given money for the king's purse by the Treasurer of Scotland. Tennent delivered £50 Scots to the Master of Work John Scrimgeour of Myres for the building of the tennis court at Falkland Palace.

At St Andrews, on 19 May 1540, James V gave 44 shillings to two Dutchmen who played and danced for him on the shore. James twice paid out for farm animals killed by accident with a culverin, a new portable gun.

=== Yeoman of the wardrobe ===
Tennent's other role was yeoman and master of the wardrobe. The wardrobe was a large establishment which employed almost 40 individuals over the personal reign. There were embroiderers, tailors, a laundry, tapestry men, and carts to transport the clothes, tapestries, and cloths-of-estate between the palaces. Tennent took delivery of linen for bed sheets, the king's shirts, and night caps. He bought canvas to hang around the king's gowns in the wardrobe. He made an inventory of the royal wardrobe in November 1542.

Tennent was in charge of the Honours of Scotland and ordered a new case to be made for a sword in March 1539. This may have been the sword sent by Pope Paul III in 1537, which is now lost.

=== Royal hunting ===
When James V went to hunt at Cramalt Tower in Meggetland in September 1538, Tennent brought bedding from Linlithgow Palace and the wardrobe servant Malcolm Gourlay brought tents stored at Holyrood Palace for his company.

James V and Mary of Guise went hunting in Glenartney and Glen Finglas in September 1539. Tennent hired men and horses from Dunblane to bring their bedding from Stirling. These hunting trips involved Highland clothing such as a "heland cot", "heland tartane" hose, and "heland sarks" (shirts).

James kept hare hounds, raches, and earth dogs (terriers), and Bawte the "King's best belovit dog" mentioned by the poet David Lyndsay. Huntsmen included Badman whose speciality was starting sitting hares.

John Tennent and Oliver Sinclair practiced archery with Mary of Guise. A bow, glove, arm brace, and a dozen arrows were bought for her in 1542.

== France ==
When James V went to France in 1536, he first met a prospective bride, Marie de Vendôme, daughter of Charles, Duke of Vendôme, at St. Quentin in Picardy. It is said that at their meeting James instructed Tennent to pretend to be him and they exchanged clothes. This story appears in four sixteenth century chronicles. Adam Abell and George Buchanan mention the disguise; only John Lesley names Tennent; Lindsay of Pitscottie's version is the most elaborate but does not identify the servant. As Lesley's translator put it;

"he takis on the habit of his servand and cumis to the place quhair sche was, for he finyet himselfe Johne Tennantis servand, quhom in this iornay the king with him had his servand."

Tennent is known to have been on the French trip, and his one diplomatic errand was not a success. oO 24 February 1537, James sent him from Compiegne with letters and a verbal messages for Henry VIII of England and Thomas Cromwell. A letter from Lord Borthwick to Cromwell, dated at Compiegne 23 February 1537 survives. Tennent was probably bearer, and assured to be "weil giffin to ye verite". Margaret Tudor complained that he was not well received in England. She wrote to her brother, Henry VIII;

"plesit Zoure Grace to wit, thare is in this realme ane grete wourde that thare wes ane servand of the King my sonnis come to Zoure Grace, quhome thai call Johnne Tennand, quha wes not wele tane with, as thai say."

James came back from France with Madeleine of Valois as his queen: Tennent brought their trunks from Leith to Holyroodhouse.

== Death of James V and the Honours of Scotland ==
Tennent was a signatory to the instrument made at Falkland Palace at the king's deathbed which David Beaton used to attempt to claim the regency. After the death of James V, John Tennent carried out the instructions of Regent Arran and Cardinal Beaton, and dispersed numerous items from the king's wardrobe and armoury to their favourites. A record of these gifts survives in the British Library.

According to the title page of the manuscript inventory, William Baillie of Lamington and John Kirkcaldy received the wardrobe goods "fra Johne Tennent quha had the keping and charge of befoir in our said soverane lordis tyme". Tennent handed over the late king's crown set all over with precious stones and orient pearl together with a sceptre set with a "great beriall" (a rock crystal) in the head of it, and the sword of honour with two belts.

The king's former lawyer, Adam Otterburn received a gift of armour on 22 December by the order of Cardinal Beaton, including a "secret courage", a helmet covered with corduroy, a "Jack of plate", two rapiers and other items.

== Marriage and family ==
John Tennent married Mause Atkinson (Mavis or Marion Acheson) who had been the king's laundress since 1516. The household books record barrels of soap delivered to her for washing table linen. She also made linen items, like nightcaps, for the king.

His property, Listonshiels, was in the parish of Kirkliston. It belonged to Torphichen Preceptory and as a reward for his services, John paid a reduced feudal rent; "listonschelis, set to iohne tennent be the kingis command in feu for £6 of maile allanerlie", £6 rent only. Another servant, Robert Hamilton, enjoyed a similar privilege at Briggis. Tennent and Atkinson were granted lands in Abernethy in 1531.

John and Mause had no surviving children, and Listonshiels passed to John's brother Patrick Tennent by 1549. Patrick Tennent was married to Elizabeth Hoppar, whose sister Katrine Hoppar was married to the Edinburgh merchant Andrew Moubray (III) who built Moubray House in Edinburgh.
