= James Atkinhead =

James Atkinhead or Aikenhead was a Scottish courtier, a diplomat, and Captain of Dunbar Castle.

== The King's marriage ==
Atkinhead was a member of the royal household of James V of Scotland. He became involved in the king's marriage plans and was sent to France at least three times.

In January 1535, James V wrote to Francis I of France discussing negotiations about his marriage to a French bride. An marital alliance with France had been agreed in 1517 by the Treaty of Rouen. He sent Atkinhead to France. Atkinhead was instructed to explain that James V could not deviate from the 1517 Treaty of Rouen by marrying a bride who was not a Princess without the consent of the Parliament of Scotland.

Francis I was suggesting that James V could marry Mary of Bourbon rather than his daughter Madeleine of Valois. Aitkinhead was sent to France to meet Mary of Bourbon, instructed to "see and wesie the gentyll woman that is offerit us", to note her personage, her manners, "having" (deportment), and conversation. Atkinhead, if satisfied on these points, was to enquire about a dowry for Mary as if she were a daughter of Francis I. If the business was concluded, Mary of Bourbon should "haste home" to Scotland with an "honest train" of gentlewomen before winter. James sent letters on the same day with Aikenhead to Philippe Chabot and Anne de Montmorency.

The Duke of Albany suggested that James V might marry Christina of Denmark, now the widowed Duchess of Milan, and James V halted progress on plans for the marriage to Mary of Bourbon. At this time, there was also an investigation into the possibility of him marrying his former mistress, Margaret Erskine. On 28 December 1535, Aikenhead was sent to France to resume the Vendôme marriage plan and get the best deal for James V. Atkinhead's instructions included that Mary's train should consist of a 'sobir nummyr' of gentlewomen. James V then appointed "procurators", his legal representatives, to finalise the match.

James V married Madeleine of Valois at Notre-Dame de Paris on 1 January 1537, and after her death, Mary of Guise. Atkinhead was made Captain of Dunbar Castle.

== Family ==
In 1539 the Earl of Norfolk mentioned that a member of the Hamilton family, wife of the late Captain of Dunbar, was living in Berwick-upon-Tweed. She was a daughter of Patrick Hamilton of Kincavil.
