= Exchequer Rolls of Scotland =

Records of the Scottish Exchequer dating from 1326 to 1708

The Exchequer Rolls of Scotland (Latin:Rotuli scaccarii regum scotorum) are historic records of the Scottish Exchequer dating from 1326 to 1708. The accounts were the responsibility of the Comptroller of Scotland. The National Records of Scotland also has corresponding precepts and receipts for some comptrollery accounts, known as "vouchers".

== Publication ==
The rolls up to the year 1600 were published in book form in the late nineteenth and early twentieth centuries, with a new numbering scheme.

The Exchequer Rolls of Scotland, 1326-1600, 23 vols. (1878-1908)

- (1884) Vol VII A.D. 1468-1469

== See also ==
- Pipe Rolls
