= Adam Abell =

Scottish friar

- Born: 1480; Prestonpans
- Died: 1540 (aged 59–60)
- Occupation: Scottish friar

Adam Abell (ca. 1480 – ca. 1540) was a Scottish friar at Jedburgh Abbey. He wrote a chronicle in the 1530s that gives an insight into contemporary thought and contains anecdotes that appear in later writings. The manuscript of the Roit or Quheil of Tyme is kept at the National Library of Scotland, Ms. 1746. It was donated by Lt.-Colonel W. W. Cunninghame of Caprington.

== Life ==
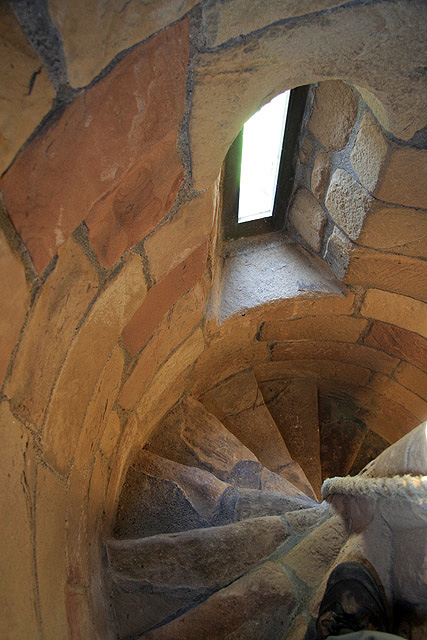
Adam Abell composed the Wheel of Time at Jedburgh Abbey

Abell was born at Prestonpans (then known as Salt Preston) around 1480. He was related to the Bellenden family; Robert Bellenden, Abbot of Holyrood was his great-uncle. Abell became a friar at Inchaffray Abbey in 1495, then moved to be an Observantine Franciscan friar at Jedburgh. His chronicle, the Roit or Quheil of Tyme ends in 1537. Possibly Abell died soon after. The manuscript survived in the family of Sinclair of Roslin Castle.

== The Roit or Quheil of Tyme ==
Abell regards himself as a continuator of Hector Boece. He recounts much legendary history including the story of King Lear and his daughters, and Macbeth and the witches. Abell briefly mentions Lady Catherine Gordon, the Scottish wife of Perkin Warbeck, recording an unlikely rumour that when she remained at the English court it was thought she married Henry VII.

The chronicle ends in 1537 mentioning a process of divorce between Margaret Tudor, and Harry Stewart, Lord Methven. Norman Macdougall thought the three pages of the Quheil of Tyme that refer to James III of Scotland significant enough to print in his study of the king. Abell said of the death of James III in 1488:

"thai conspirit againis the king and gaif him batell beside striwiling and thare he wes slane. He wes confessit before with maistir Johne Yrland proffessor of theologie., ... thai slew him in the mill of bannoburne.

Macdougall found nothing strikingly original in Abell's account of James III, which depends in part on Hector Boece, but was able to infer that his other sources for the reign were sympathetic to James III and Alexander Stewart, Duke of Albany, and to Abell's contemporary, John Stewart, Duke of Albany. Writing in 1537 of events in the previous year, Abell tells the story of the visit of James V of Scotland to Mary of Bourbon, with the interesting suggestion that there had been an exchange of portraits;

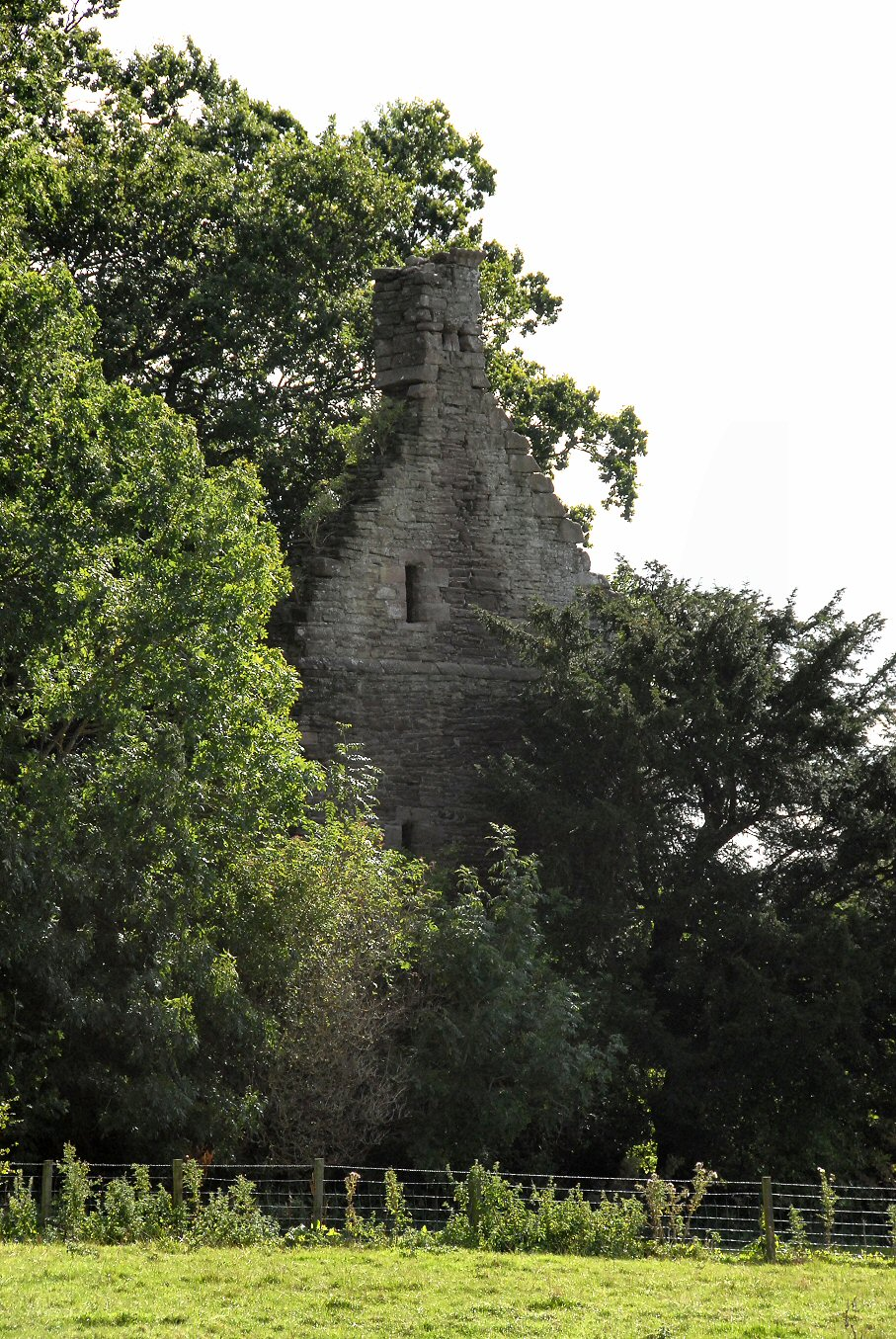
Adam Abell entered Inchaffray Abbey as an Augustinian friar

"In ane dissimilit vestement he com to the duik of Vendôme fathir of the lady that he suld haif marreit. He wes knawin thare be his picture."

Alasdair Stewart contends that Abell's moralising handling of his subject matter and the examples he offers show his own strong character, contemporary attitudes and a unique view of international events from the cloister at Jedburgh.
