= Mary of Bourbon =

French princess (1515–1538)

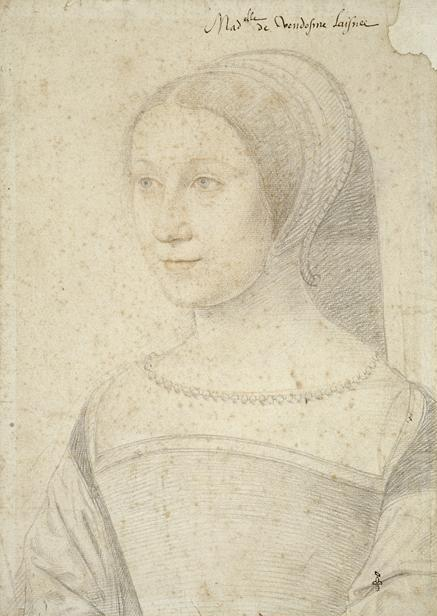
- Mary, as drawn by Jean Clouet in 1534. Later during the same year, this sketch was sent to the Scottish court for James V to see.
- Born: 29 October 1515; Château de la Fère, Picardie
- Died: 28 September 1538 (aged 22); Château de la Fère, Picardie
- Burial: Abbaye de Notre-Dame, Soissons
- House: Bourbon
- Father: Charles, Duke of Vendôme
- Mother: Françoise d'Alençon
- Religion: Roman Catholicism

Mary of Bourbon or Marie de Bourbon (29 October 1515 – 28 September 1538) was a daughter of Charles, Duke of Vendôme, and Françoise d'Alençon, daughter of René, Duke of Alençon. Mary was the subject of marriage negotiations of James V of Scotland. He visited her in France, but subsequently married Madeleine of Valois. Mary died two years later.

== Life ==
=== First negotiation ===
A marriage to a French princess for the Scottish king had been an expectation since the Franco-Scottish alliance by the Treaty of Rouen of 1517. The Treaty itself was primarily concerned with mutual military support. As James V of Scotland came of age, at first it was thought he would marry the Princess, Madeleine of Valois. By December 1534, it was clear that Madeleine was sickly. Francis I of France suggested that James V should marry Mary of Bourbon instead to fulfill the Treaty. The marriage was promoted by John Stewart, Duke of Albany, and by the end of 1534, his secretary Nicolas Canivet and James V's secretary Thomas Erskine of Haltoun had met the Scottish King and shown him Mary's portrait. However, Marguerite de Navarre had discussed this marriage plan with Henry VIII of England's diplomat, the Duke of Norfolk in June 1533. She pointed out that Charles, Duke of Vendôme was closely allied with Charles V, Holy Roman Emperor and claimed that Mary of Bourbon and her sister were 'sore made awry.' The Queen of Navarre wondered if James V might marry Christina of Denmark, and suggested her sister-in-law Isabella as Queen of Scotland instead.

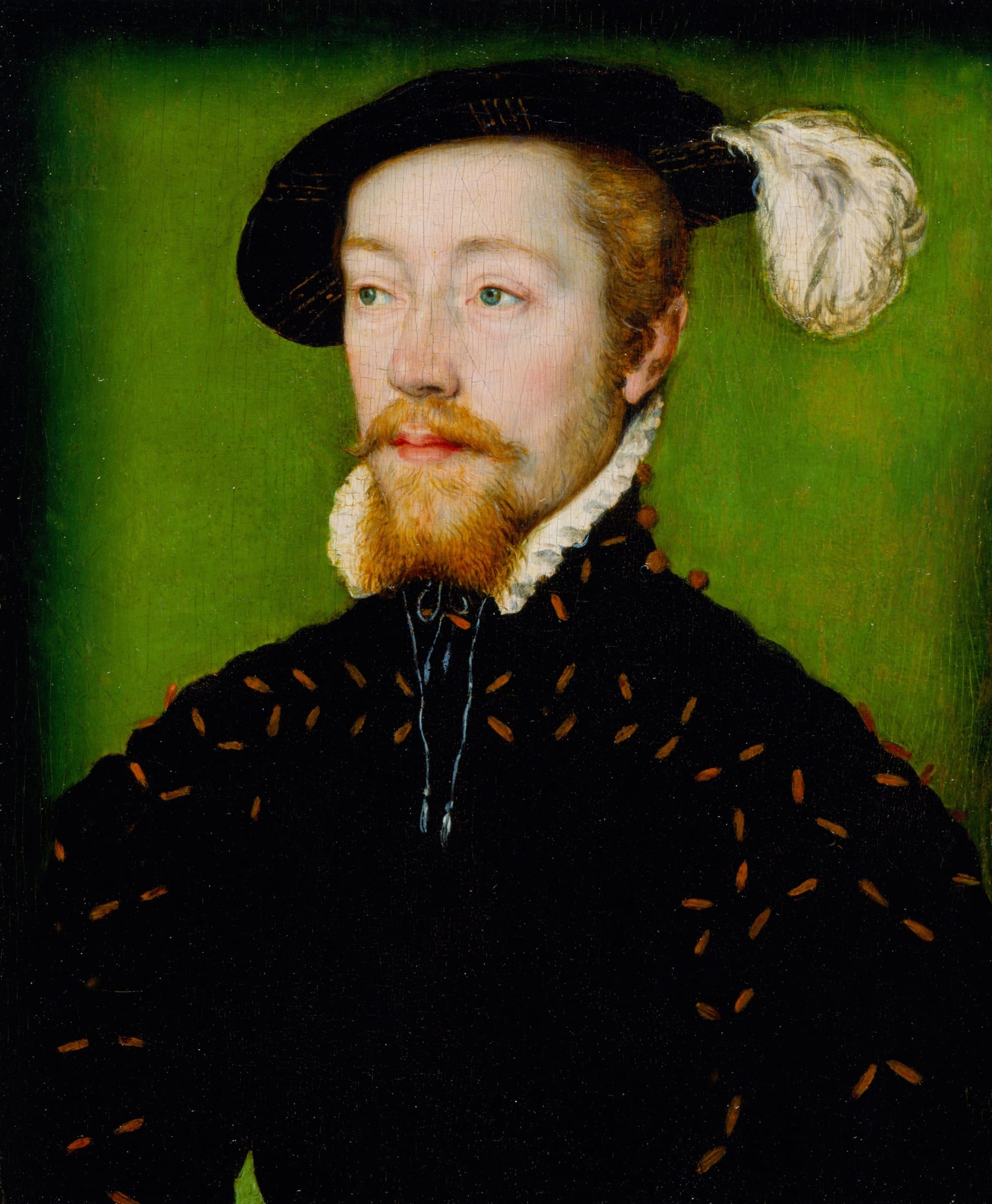
James V of Scotland, attributed to Corneille de Lyon circa 1535

In January 1535, James V wrote to Francis I explaining that he felt he had been misrepresented in this negotiation, and sent his herald, James Atkinhead to France. Aikenhead was instructed to explain that James could not deviate from the 1517 Treaty by marrying a bride not a Princess without the consent of the Parliament of Scotland.

=== Second negotiation ===
As Francis I had once again firmly indicated to James V that a French princess of the royal family would not be available to him since Madeleine was too frail, the negotiation for his alternative marriage to Mary of Bourbon began again in earnest.

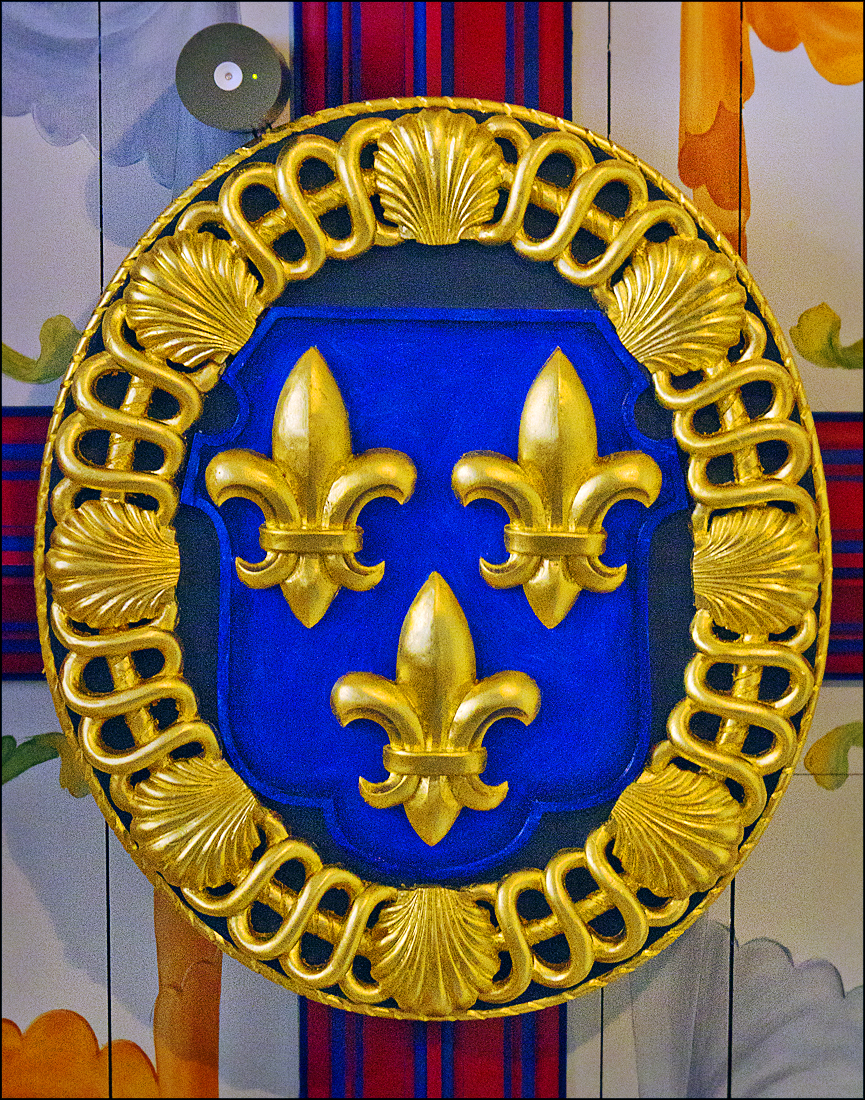
The badge of the Order of Saint Michael on the ceiling of the bedroom of James V at Stirling Palace

On 3 June 1535, James V wrote from Stirling Castle to Francis I regarding his possible marriage to Madeleine, the treaty, and the alternative offer of Mary of Bourbon. He wrote that he had heard from Nicolas Canivet that Mary of Bourbon was a possible bride. James V sent the letter with his "familiar servant", the herald James Atkenhead, who was told to; "see and wesie the gentyll woman that is offerit us", to note her personage, manners, 'having' (deportment) and conversation. Atkinhead, if satisfied on these points, was to enquire about a dowry for Mary as if she were a daughter of Francis. If the business was concluded, Mary should 'haste home' to Scotland with an 'honest train' of gentlewomen before winter. James sent letters on the same day with Atkenhead to Philippe Chabot and Anne de Montmorency.

Again, the Duke of Albany briefly entertained the idea that James V might marry Christina of Denmark, now the widowed Duchess of Milan, and James V halted progress on the marriage to Mary of Bourbon. At the point, there was also an investigation into the possibility of him marrying his former mistress, Margaret Erskine. Then, on 28 December 1535, Aikenhead was sent to France to resume the Vendôme marriage plan and get the best deal for James V. Once again, Atkenhead's instructions included that Mary's train should consist of a 'sobir nummyr' of gentlewomen. James V then appointed his "procurators", his legal representatives to finalise the match.

On 29 March 1536 a final contract made at Cremieu, near Lyon, for Mary to marry James V of Scotland, was sealed by Francis I of France. The meeting was convened by Jean III d'Estourmel, Master of Household to the Duke of Vendôme, assisted by Mathieu de Lonjoüe, Bishop of Soissons, Guillaume Poyet, President of the French parliament, Guillaume Féau, seigneur de Fernay, Royal Chamberlain, and the Scottish herald James Aikenhead, whose name appears in French records as "Hacquenet". The resultant contract was signed by Cardinal Tournon, the Chancellor Antoine de Bourg, Anne de Montmorency, Marshal of France, and Admiral Philippe de Chabot, Count of Busançois. James V had already consented to the marriage by appointing his procurators to finalise the details on 29 December 1535. Among its provisions, the contract provided that Francis I would transfer Dunbar Castle with the gift of all of its guns, which was kept by the Duke of Albany, to James V, and if James died first Mary would have Falkland Palace for the rest of her life.

In April 1536 Francis I consolidated the agreement by sending James V the collar of the Order of Saint Michael as a token of his affection and their family union. Francis sent the collar with a courtier, Guillaume d'Yzernay, to James Stewart, Earl of Moray. Moray had already been made a member of the order by the Duke of Vendôme, who had probably taken part in the negotiations. He was instructed to present the collar to James V with the same ceremonies that the Duke had observed at his investiture into the order. The Duke of Albany, who had promoted the marriage plan, died in July 1536.

James V decided to travel to France and visited Mary of Bourbon at St. Quentin in Picardy in September 1536. He stay for eight days, then went south to meet Francis I. Instead of marrying Mary, he married the French king's daughter, Madeleine of Valois. On 14 October 1536, Rodolfo Pio da Carpi, Bishop of Faenza, wrote that Francis I now intended Mary of Bourbon to marry Francis, Marquis of Lorraine. Both Madeleine and Mary of Bourbon died soon after. The Scottish chronicle writer Robert Lindsay of Pitscottie wrote;

"the duik of Vandones dochter, quho tuke sick displeasour at the king of Scotlandis marriage that shoe deceast immediately thaireftir: quhairat the king of Scotland was highlie displeased, thinkand that he was the occasioun of that gentlewoman's death."

== A meeting in disguise? ==
Four Scottish chronicles record a story that James V had entered the court of the Duke of Vendôme in disguise. He had exchanged his clothing with a servant, perhaps John Tennent of Listonshiels. Mary was not fooled and recognised him from his distinctive red hair and the portrait she had been given. Although this story seems doubtful, a modern historian has noted that English observers reported some secrecy about James's trip to St Quentin from Dieppe. Adam Abell's contemporary chronicle is the earliest source;

"In ane dissimilit vestement he com to the duik of Vendôme fathir of the lady that he suld haif marreit. He wes knawin thare be his picture."

After James V married Madeleine, and Dunbar Castle and its guns were handed over, James Aikenhead, who was described as the King's Great Butler, was made its Captain.

== Ancestry ==
Ancestors of Mary of Bourbon

8. John VIII, Count of Vendôme
4. Francis, Count of Vendôme
9. Isabelle de Beauvau
2. Charles, Duke of Vendôme
10. Peter II, Count of Saint-Pol
5. Marie of Luxembourg
11. Margaret of Savoy
1. Mary of Bourbon
12. John II, Duke of Alençon
6. René, Duke of Alençon
13. Marie of Armagnac
3. Françoise of Alençon
14. Frederick II, Count of Vaudémont
7. Margaret of Lorraine
15. Yolande, Duchess of Lorraine
