= Sebastian Giustinian =

Venetian diplomat

Sebastian Giustinian (1460-1543) was a sixteenth-century Venetian diplomat.

Between 1515 and 1519, during the reign of King Henry VIII of England, Giustinian was the Venetian ambassador to England.
