= Salamander of Leith =

16th-century Royal Scots naval ship

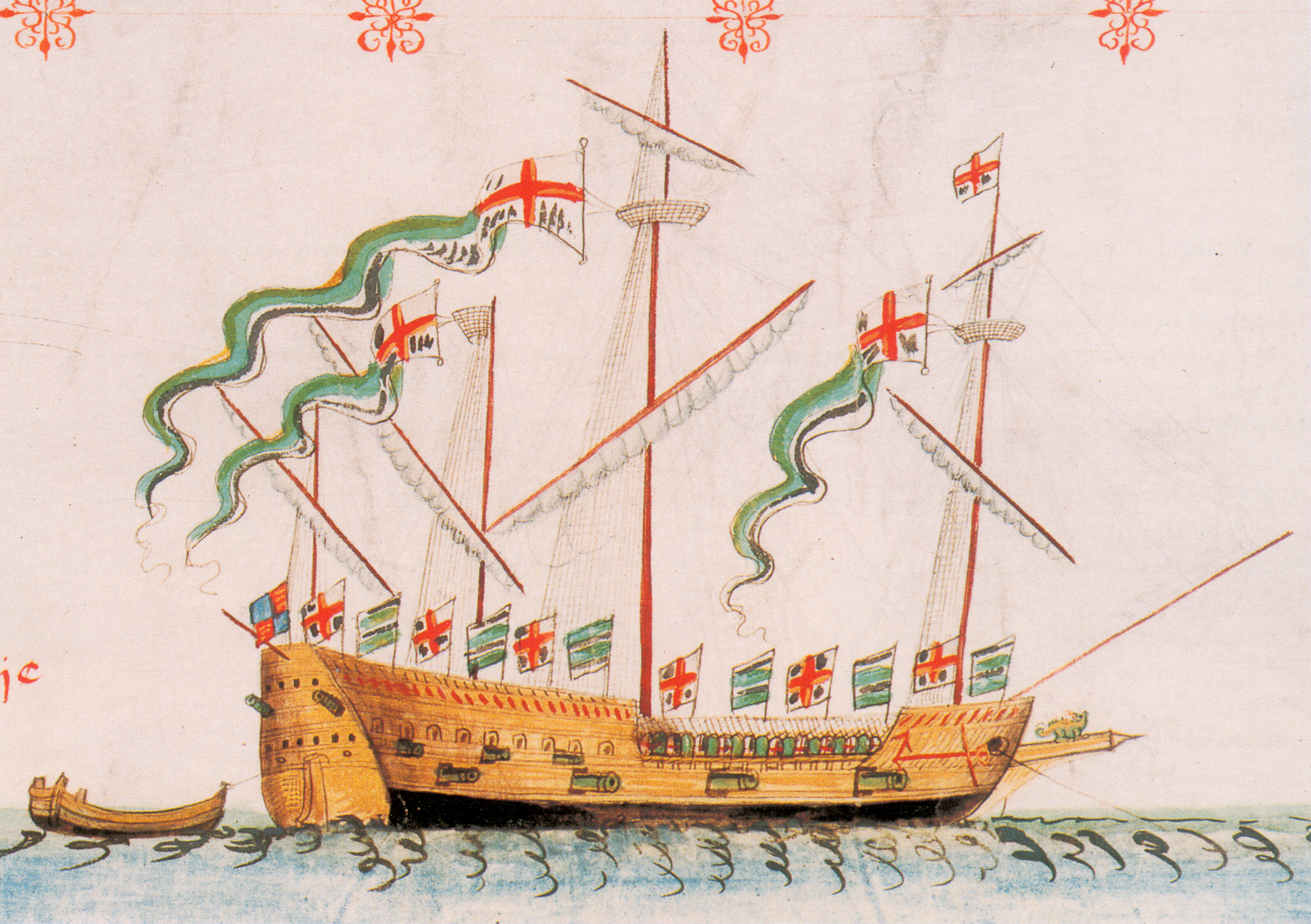
- The galleass Salamander, in the Anthony Roll

History

Scotland
- Name: Salamander
- Builder: French
- Laid down: Unknown
- Launched: Unknown
- Acquired: 1537
- In service: 1537
- Out of service: 1544
- Captured: 1544
- Fate: Unknown
- Notes: Used against Scotland in 1547 by England.

General characteristics
- Class & type: Warship
- Tons burthen: 300 tons
- Propulsion: Sails
- Complement: 220
- Armament: 10 or more cannons; 22 cross-bows; 9 handguns

Salamander was a warship of the 16th-century Royal Scots Navy. She was a wedding present from Francis I of France to James V of Scotland.

== Flagship of Scotland ==
The ship was repaired or finished in France in March 1537, and James V gave gifts to workmen who set up a new mast at Honfleur. James gave a reward of 20 French crowns to the "master timberman" who made or refitted the Salamander.

As the Scottish fleet neared Scotland, boats from Bamburgh supplied fish. Henry Ray saw James V and Madeleine of Valois arrive at Leith on 19 May 1537, noting four great Scottish ships and ten French. Two French ships remained in Scotland as wedding presents; the Salamander and the Morischer, Moriset or Great Unicorn. A list of French wedding gifts includes these two as 'great ships for the wars', with two further 'gallant ships of war.'

After a major refit by John Barton, the Salamander took James V on a pilgrimage from Leith to the Isle of May ending at Pittenweem, then returned to France in May 1538 to escort the new queen, Mary of Guise, accompanied by the Moriset, and Mary Willoughby. Mary of Guise herself sailed from Le Havre with Jean de Clamorgan, sieur de Saâne-Saint-Just, captain of the Réale, with two other French ships or galleys, the Saint Jehan, and Saint Pierre. The three French captains and their commander Jacques de Fountaines, Sieur de Mormoulins, were rewarded with gold coins in June 1539. Mormoulins had commanded the French fleet that brought Madeleine in 1537.

New costumes were bought for 4 trumpeters, 4 drummers, and 3 whistlers for the Scottish fleet. The keepers of the Salamander were Alexander Lun and John Reid, and John Ker was its master.

The Salamander became the king's flagship. In 1538 it was equipped with a new compass and four clocks. The Great Lion and the Salamander were fitted with 15 large wheeled guns and 10 smaller wheeled guns in May 1540. The 22 crossbows of the Salamander and 9 small hagbut guns used on the tops were inspected and repaired, and two and half fothers of lead bought for ballast. The ships were "gallantry trimmed with painting and gilding".

Next month, James V embarked on the newly equipped Salamander at Leith, after first making his will on 12 June, and accompanied by the Mary Willoughby, the Great Unicorn, the Little Unicorn, the Lion and twelve other ships sailed to Kirkwall on Orkney. Then he went to Lewis on the West. James's fleet in the West was provisioned from Dumbarton, Ayr and Irvine and returned to Edinburgh by 6 July. John Barton sailed to Dieppe with the Great Lion and Salamander in June 1541, and had their 27 guns cleaned and the latter ship re-rigged.

During 1542, the Mary Willoughby, the Lion, and the Salamander attacked merchants and fishermen off Whitby under the command of John Barton, son of Robert Barton, the 'Skipper from Leith'. In December 1542, the Mary Willoughby, the Salamander and the Lion blockaded a London merchant ship called the Antony of Bruges in a creek on the coast of Brittany near 'Poldavy Haven.'

== In the English Navy ==
The Salamander and the Scottish-built Unicorn were captured at Leith and used as transport for the return journey of a part of Lord Hertford's land army on 14 May 1544, after the burning of Edinburgh, with ballast of 80,000 Scottish iron cannon-shot. Eustache Chapuys reported their capture and the destruction of the fortress on the island of Inchkeith.

With 200 crew and 20 gunners, her armament in the English fleet listed on 1 January 1548 consisted of: 2 brass culverins; 3 brass demi-culverins; 4 sakers; 7 iron port pieces; 3 iron fowlers; 2 iron quarter slings; 17 iron double bases; and 11 hand guns. There were 140 yew bows; 90 bills; and 70 moorish pikes. The Salamander carried roughly half the armament of Henry VIII's flagship the Mary Rose.

The Salamander, listed in the English fleet as 300 tons with 220 men, and called a galleas in the Anthony Roll, and the Unicorn, returned to Scotland in Edward Clinton's invasion fleet of August 1547, and presumably contributed to the naval bombardment at the Battle of Pinkie. The Salamander was in the fleet taken to Orkney by John Clere in 1557. She may have been destroyed as late as 1574.
