= Scottish Exchequer =

The Scottish Exchequer is a group of Directorates of the Scottish Government. The Exchequer was formed in December 2010 with a re-organisation of the Scottish Government.

The Scottish Exchequer is responsible for the Scottish Budget, including taxation, spending and measuring performance. The directorates within the Scottish Exchequer have responsibility for financial strategy, the fiscal framework between Scotland and the United Kingdom, public sector pay policy, capital borrowing, and engagement with UK Government bodies.

The current Director-General is Alyson Stafford.

== Directorates of the Scottish Exchequer ==
- Budget and Public Spending Directorate
- Financial Strategy Directorate
- Internal Audit and Assurance Directorate
- Performance and Strategic Outcomes
- Taxation and Fiscal Sustainability

== Cabinet Secretary and Ministers ==
Budget and Public Spending Directorate

- Kate Forbes MSP, Cabinet Secretary for Finance and the Economy
- Tom Arthur MSP, Minister for Public Finance, Planning and Community Wealth
