= Madeleine of Valois =

Queen of Scotland in 1537

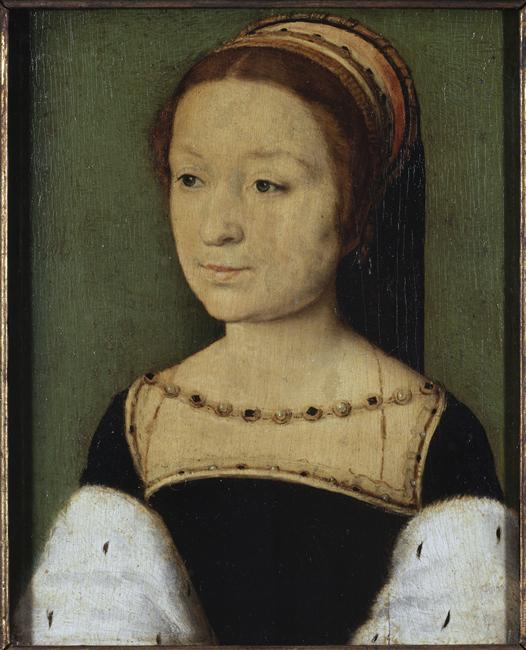
- Portrait by Corneille de la Haye

Queen consort of Scotland
- Tenure: 1 January 1537 – 7 July 1537
- Born: 10 August 1520; Château de Saint-Germain-en-Laye, Saint-Germain-en-Laye, France
- Died: 7 July 1537 (aged 16); Holyrood Palace, Edinburgh, Scotland
- Burial: Holyrood Abbey
- Spouse: James V of Scotland (m. 1537)
- House: Valois-Angoulême
- Father: Francis I of France
- Mother: Claude, Duchess of Brittany

Madeleine of Valois (10 August 1520 – 7 July 1537) was a French princess who briefly became Queen of Scotland in 1537 as the first wife of King James V. The marriage was arranged in accordance with the Treaty of Rouen, and they were married at Notre-Dame de Paris in January 1537, despite French reservations over her failing health. Madeleine died in July 1537, only six months after the wedding and less than two months after arriving in Scotland, resulting in her nickname, the "Summer Queen".

== Early life ==
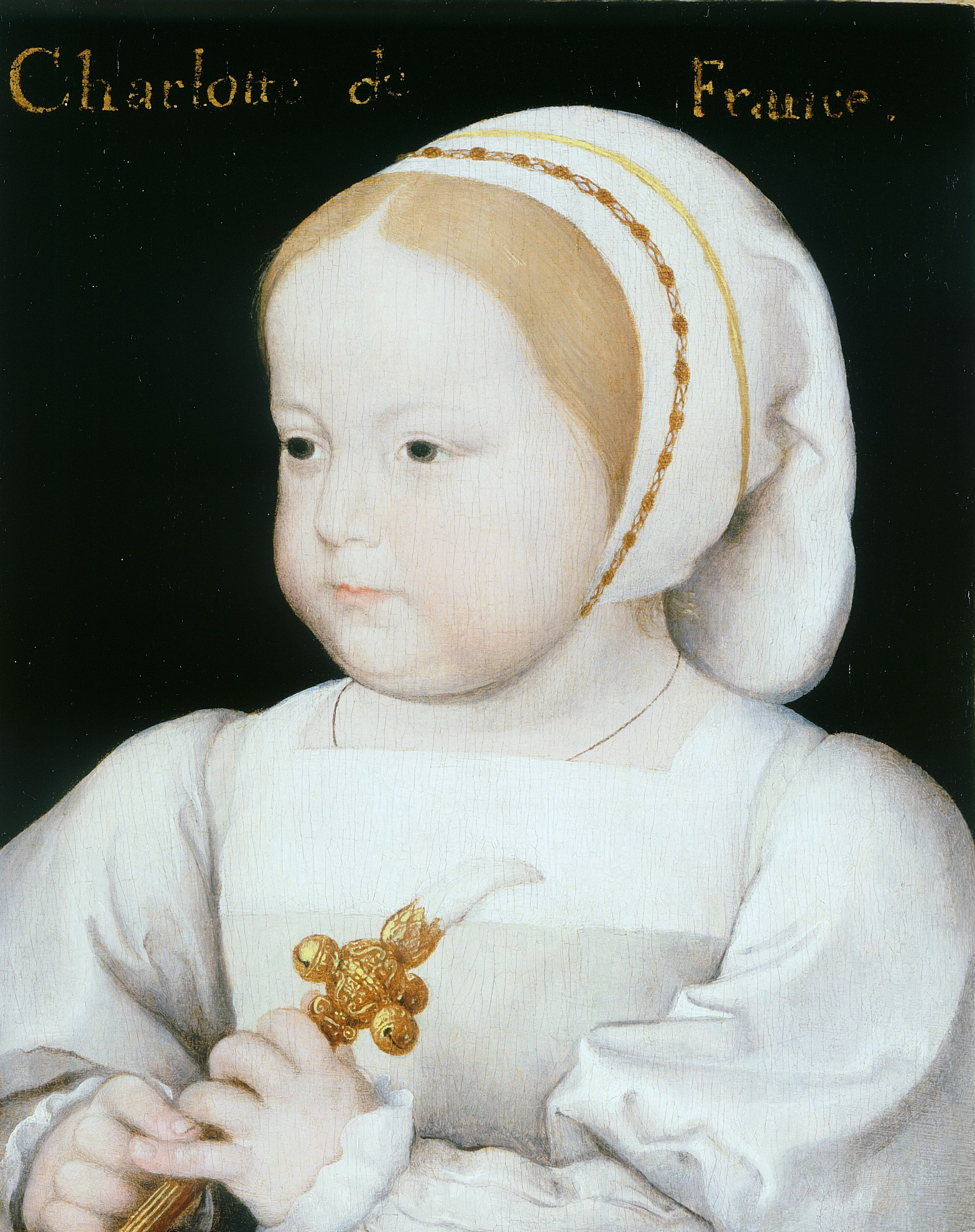
Portrait of Madeleine misidentified as her older sister, Charlotte of Valois by Jean Clouet (c. 1522)

Madeleine was born at the Château de Saint-Germain-en-Laye, France, the fifth child and third daughter of King Francis I of France and Claude, Duchess of Brittany, herself the eldest daughter of King Louis XII and Duchess Anne of Brittany.

She was frail from birth, and grew up in the warm and temperate Loire Valley region of France, rather than at Paris, as her father feared that the cold would destroy her delicate health. Together with her sister, Margaret, she was raised by her aunt, Marguerite de Navarre until her father remarried and his new wife, Eleanor of Austria, took them into her own household. By her sixteenth birthday, she had contracted tuberculosis.

== Marriage negotiations ==
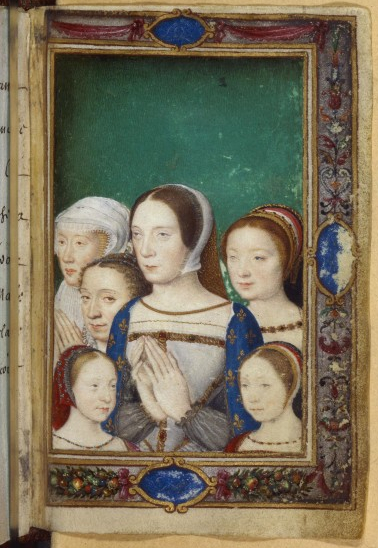
Madeleine (back right) with her mother and sisters, from the Book of Hours of Catherine de'Medici.

Three years before Madeleine's birth, the Franco-Scottish Treaty of Rouen was made to bolster the Auld Alliance after Scotland's defeat at the Battle of Flodden. A marriage between a French princess and the Scottish King was one of its provisions. In April 1530, John Stewart, Duke of Albany, was appointed commissioner to finalize the royal marriage between James V and Madeleine. However, as Madeleine did not enjoy good health, another French bride, Mary of Bourbon, was proposed.

James V sent his herald James Atkinhead to see Mary of Bourbon, and a contract was made for James to marry her. Although Mary not being a daughter of the King, she was allotted a dowry like that of a French princess. King James travelled to France in 1536 to meet Mary of Bourbon. However upon arrival James was not attracted to Mary. James was taken with the beauty of the delicate Madeleine, he asked Francis I for her hand in marriage. Fearing the harsh climate of Scotland would prove fatal to his daughter's already failing health, Francis I initially refused to permit the marriage.

James V met Francis I and the French royal household between Roanne and Lyon on 13 October. He continued to press Francis I for Madeleine's hand, and despite his reservations and nagging fears, Francis I reluctantly granted permission to the marriage only after Madeleine made her interest in marrying James very obvious. The court moved down the Loire Valley to Amboise, and to the Château de Blois, and the marriage contract was signed at Crémieu on 26 November 1536.

== Wedding at Notre-Dame ==
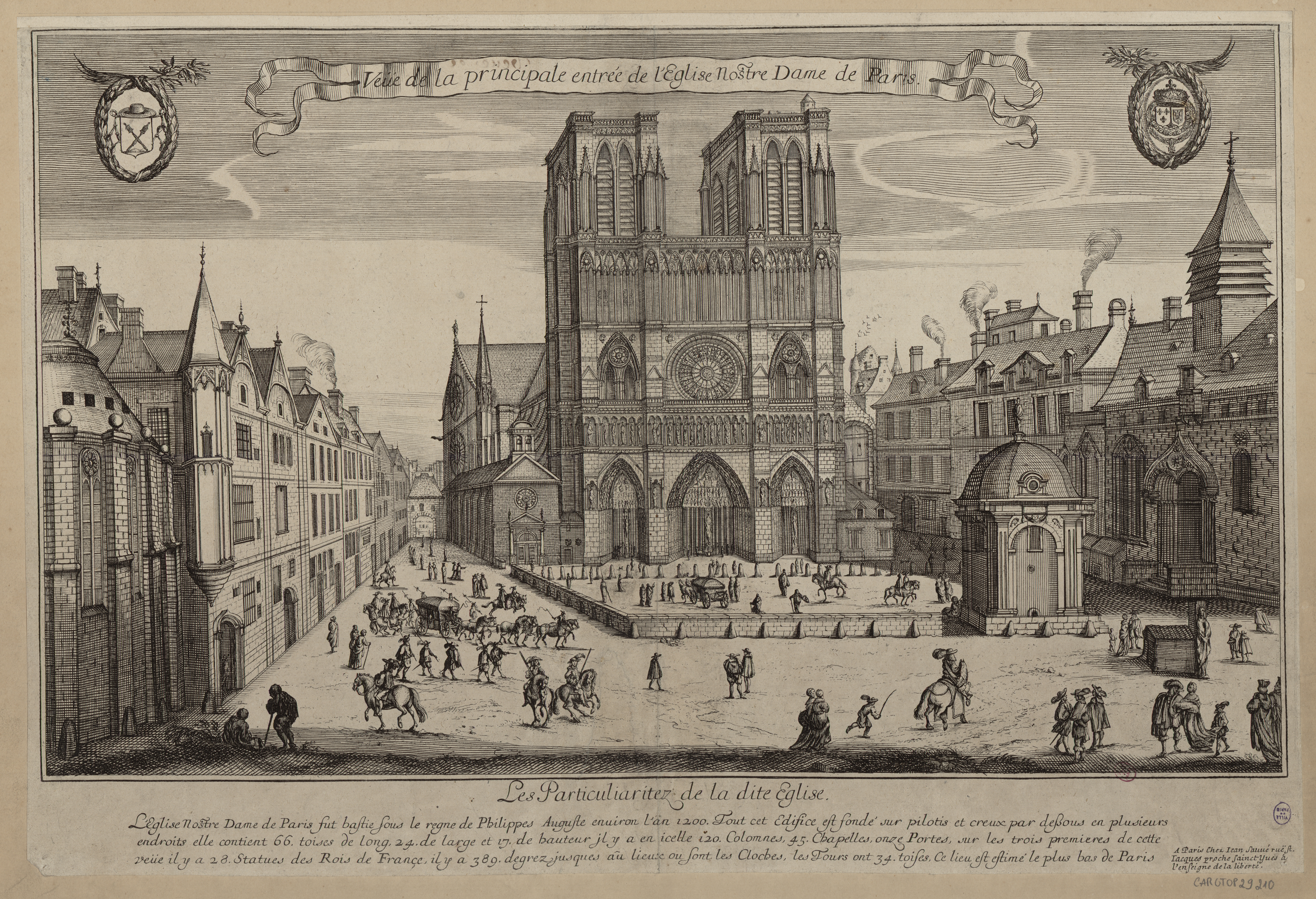
Notre-Dame de Paris and its environs, known as the Parvis, Jean Marot, 17th century

In preparation for the wedding, Francis I bought clothes and furnishings for Madeleine; jewels and gold chains were supplied by Regnault Danet, linen and cloths by Marie de Genevoise and Phillipe Savelon, clothes by the tailors Marceau Goursault and Charles Lacquait, veils by Jean Guesdon, and trimmings by Victor de Laval, who also made passementerie for a bed that Francis gave the couple. The goldsmith Thibault Hotman made silver plate for Madeleine. The merchants of the royal "argenterie", René Tardif and Robert Fichepain supplied silks and woollen cloth. A quantity of gold and silver trimmings for embroidering the clothes of Madeleine and her ladies were ordered from Baptiste Dalverge, a wire-drawer. A platform walkway was constructed from the Bishop's Palace to Notre-Dame de Paris.

James bought a diamond "spousing ring" for his bride which cost 1,100 French crowns. After a Royal Entry into Paris on 31 December 1536, they were married at Notre-Dame on 1 January 1537. Madeleine wore "a precious close crown of gold upon her head, and under it a coif of gold set with stone very precious, with other sumptuous apparel according to her degree", and was attended by three "goodly ladies in cloth of gold gorgeously decked as waiters of the bride".

According to the English diplomat John Wallop, the cloth of gold clothes of the French ladies and princesses were smothered with embroidery, pearls, and gemstones. James's Scottish retinue of "goodly gentlemen, and very proper men ... were right well apparrelled after the French fashion".

There was a banquet that night in the Great Hall of the Palais de la Cité. at end, James V and others entered dancing in a masque. Over the next two weeks there were further celebrations and tournaments at the Château de la Tournelle and Louvre. Costumes for a masque were provided by Louis Delaune. The wedding festivities in 1537 were similar to those of 24 April 1558, for the wedding of Mary, Queen of Scots, and Francis, Dauphin of France.

Francis I provided Madeleine with a generous dowry of 100,000 écu, and a further 30,000 francs settled on James V. According to the marriage contract made at Blois, Madeleine renounced her and any of her heirs' claims to the French throne. If James died first, Madeleine would retain for her lifetime assets including the Earldoms of Fife, Strathearn, Ross, and Orkney with Falkland Palace, Stirling Castle, and Dingwall Castle, with the Lordship of Galloway and Threave Castle.

== Queen of Scots ==
Coat of arms of Madeleine of Valois as Queen consort of Scots

In February the couple moved to Chantilly, to Senlis and Compiègne, where James received the Papal gift of hat and sword. They stayed two nights at the Château de La Roche-Guyon. After months of festivities and celebrations, the couple left France for Scotland from Le Havre in May 1537. The French ships were commanded by Jacques de Fountaines, Sieur de Mormoulins. On 15 May, English sailors sold fish to the Scottish and French fleet off Bamburgh Head. Madeleine's health deteriorated even further, and she was very sick when the royal pair landed in Scotland. They arrived at Leith at 10 o'clock on Whitsun-eve, 19 May 1537.

According to the report of the Berwick Pursuivant Henry Ray, there were 10 French ships and 4 Scottish, including the Salamander. According to John Lesley, the ships were laden with her possessions;

"besides the Quenes Hienes furnitour, hinginis, and appareill, quhilk wes schippit at Newheavin and careit in Scotland, was also in hir awin cumpanye, transportit with hir majestie in Scotland, mony costlye jewells and goldin wark, precious stanis, orient pearle, maist excellent of any sort that was in Europe, and mony coistly abilyeaments for hir body, with mekill silver wark of coistlye cupbordis, cowpis, & plaite."

A list or inventory of wedding presents from Francis I also survives, including Arras tapestry, cloths of estate, rich beds, two cupboards of silver gilt plate, table carpets, and Persian carpets. Francis I also gave James V three of the ships, the Salamander, Morsicher, and Great Unicorn. Madeleine took up residence at Holyrood Palace on 21 May 1537.

Celebrations included a procession of the Edinburgh craft fraternities on the High Street. The Hammerman contributed to the employment of Jacques and his French drummers, a French trumpeter, and minstrels. The musicians were treated to a dinner as an extra reward.

== French household in Scotland ==
The French courtiers who came with Madeleine to Scotland to form her household included; her former governess, Anne de Boissy Gouffier, Madame de Montreuil; Anne de Viergnon, Madame de Bren or Bron; Anne Le Maye; Marguerite de Vergondois her chamberer; Marion Truffaut, her nurse; her secretary, Jean de Langeac, Bishop of Limoges; master household, Jean de St Aubin; squires and cupbearers Charles de Marconnay and Charles du Merlier; the physician Master Partix; pages John Crammy and Pierre de Ronsard; furrier Gillan; butcher John Kenneth; barber Anthony. A physician from Paris, Jacques Lecoq, set out later to join her in Scotland.

== Death ==
Madeleine wrote to her father from Edinburgh on 8 June 1537 saying that she was better and her symptoms had diminished. James V had written to Francis I asking him to send the physician Master Francisco, and Madeleine wrote that he was now needed only to perfect her cure. She signed this letter "Magdalene de France". However, a month later, on 7 July 1537, (a month before her 17th birthday), Madeleine, the so-called "Summer Queen" of Scots, died in her husband's arms at Holyrood Palace.

James V wrote to Francis I informing him of his daughter's death. He called Madeleine "my dear companion" – votre fille, ma trés chére compaigne.

Queen Madeleine was interred in Holyrood Abbey in Edinburgh, next to King James II of Scotland. Black mourning clothes were worn at her funeral, and an order was sent to the merchants of Dundee to provide black cloth. Her household servants were provided with "dule gowns", and horses at the procession had black cloths and trappings. The chapel at Holyrood Palace was draped with cloth from Milan. According to George Buchanan, this was the first use of black mourning dress in Scotland.

One of her gentlewomen, Madame de Montrueil or Motrell, visited London on her way back to France. She said that Madeleine "had no good days after her arrival there (in Scotland), but always sickly with a catarrh which descended into her stomach, which was the cause of her death".

An inventory made of the king's goods in 1542 includes some of her clothes, furnishings for her chapel, six stools for her gentlewomen to sit upon, and gold cups and other items made for her when she was a child. The grave was desecrated by a mob in 1776 and her allegedly still beautiful head was stolen.

== Commemoration ==
Madeleine's marriage and death were commemorated by the poet David Lyndsay's Deploration of Deith of Quene Magdalene. The poem describes the pageantry of the marriage in France and Scotland:

O Paris! Of all citeis principall!
Quhilk did resave our prince with laud and glorie,
Solempnitlie, throw arkis triumphall. [arkis = arches]
* * * * * *
Thou mycht have sene the preparatioun
Maid be the Thre Estaitis of Scotland
In everilk ciete, castell, toure, and town
* * * * * *
Thow saw makand rycht costlie scaffalding
Depaynted weill with gold and asure fyne
* * * * * *
Disagysit folkis, lyke creaturis devyne,
On ilk scaffold to play ane syndrie storie
Bot all in greiting turnit thow that glorie. [greiting = crying: thow = death]

Epitaphs in Latin were composed by the French writers Etienne Dolet, Nicolas Desfrenes, Jean Visagier, and an anonymous poet. Gilles Corrozet and Pierre de Ronsard wrote verses in French.

Less than a year after her death, following negotiations completed by David Beaton, James V married the widowed Mary of Guise. She had attended his wedding to Madeleine, and perhaps her uncle, Jean, Cardinal of Lorraine, suggested her to Francis I as a bride for the Scottish king. Twenty years later, listed amongst the treasures in Edinburgh Castle were two little gold cups, an agate basin, a jasper vase, and crystal jug given to Madeleine when she was a child in France.

Jean Desmontiers had written and compiled a description of Scotland for Madeleine, the Sommaire de l'Origine Description et Merveilles d'Escosse. After her death, the text was dedicated for presentation to Catherine de' Medici and printed in 1538.

Madeleine of Valois House of Valois, Angoulême branch Cadet branch of the Capetian dynasty Born: 10 August 1520 Died: 7 July 1537
Scottish royalty
Vacant Title last held by Margaret of England	Queen consort of Scots; 1537	Vacant Title next held by Mary of Guise
