= James V =

King of Scotland from 1513 to 1542

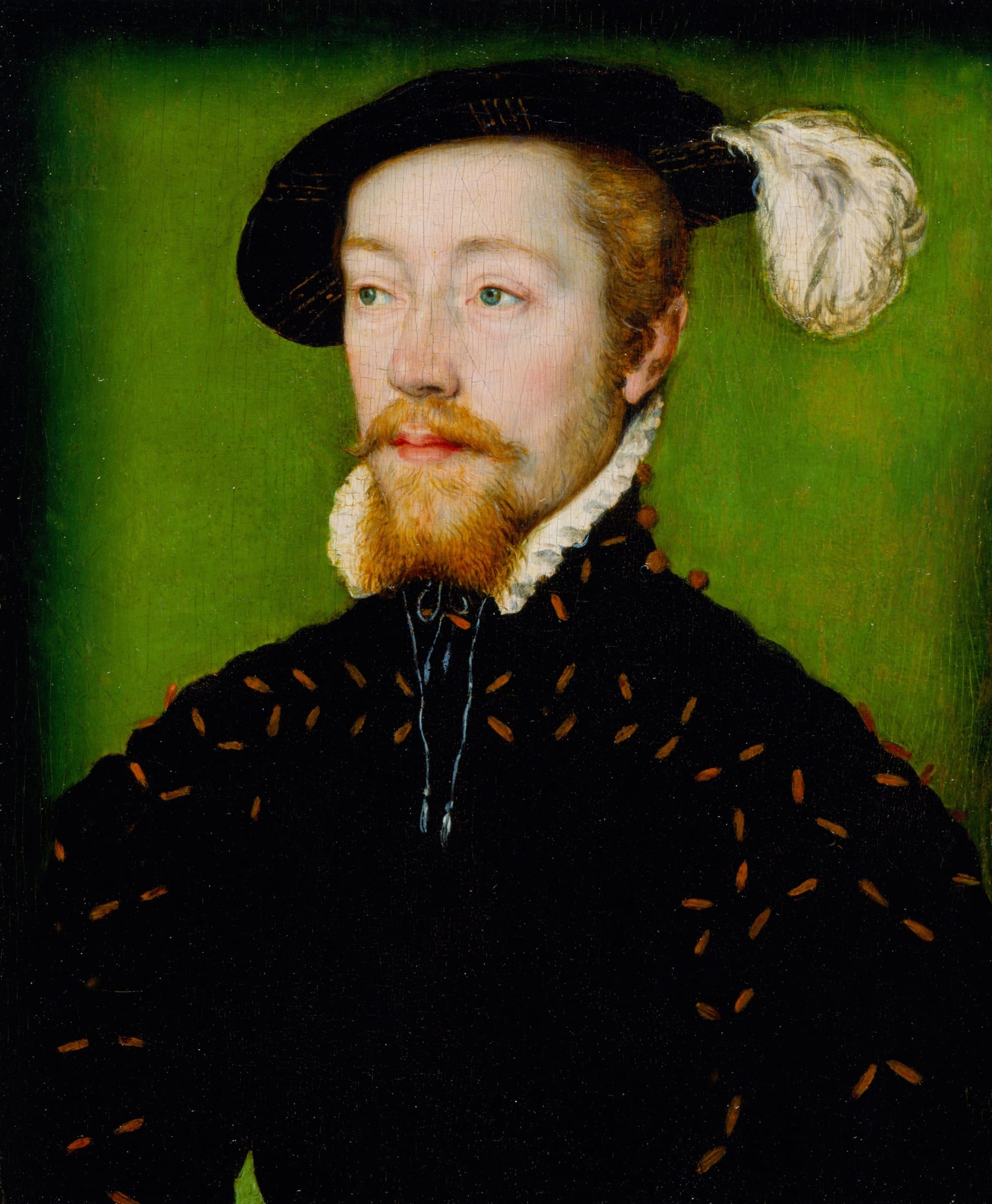
- Portrait by Corneille de Lyon, c. 1536

King of Scotland
- Reign: 9 September 1513 – 14 December 1542
- Coronation: 21 September 1513
- Predecessor: James IV
- Successor: Mary
- Regents: See list: Margaret Tudor (1513–1514, 1524–1525); John Stewart, Duke of Albany (1514–1524)
- Born: 10 April 1512; Linlithgow Palace, Linlithgow, Scotland
- Died: 14 December 1542 (aged 30); Falkland Palace, Fife, Scotland
- Burial: 8 January 1543; Holyrood Abbey
- Spouses: Madeleine of France (m. 1537; died 1537) Mary of Guise (m. 1538)
- Issue more...: James, Duke of Rothesay; Robert, Duke of Albany; Mary, Queen of Scots; Illegitimate: James Stewart, Commendator of Kelso and Melrose; James Stewart, 1st Earl of Moray; John Stewart, Commendator of Coldingham; Robert Stewart, 1st Earl of Orkney; Jean Campbell, Countess of Argyll
- House: Stewart
- Father: James IV of Scotland
- Mother: Margaret Tudor
- Religion: Catholicism

James V (10 April 1512 – 14 December 1542) was King of Scotland from 9 September 1513 until his death in 1542. He was crowned on 21 September 1513 at the age of seventeen months. James was the son of King James IV and Margaret Tudor, daughter of Henry VII of England. During his childhood, Scotland was governed by regents, firstly by his mother until she remarried, and then by his first cousin once removed, John Stewart, Duke of Albany. James's personal rule began in 1528, when he finally escaped the custody of his stepfather, Archibald Douglas, 6th Earl of Angus. His first action was to exile Angus and confiscate the lands of the Douglases.

James greatly increased his income by tightening control over royal estates and from the profits of justice, customs and feudal rights. He founded the College of Justice in 1532 and also acted to end lawlessness and rebellion in the Borders and the Hebrides. The rivalry among France, England and the Holy Roman Empire lent James unwonted diplomatic weight and saw him secure two politically and financially advantageous French marriages, first to Madeleine of Valois and then to Mary of Guise. James also fathered at least nine illegitimate children by a series of mistresses.

James's reign witnessed the beginnings of Protestantism in Scotland, and his uncle Henry VIII of England's break with Rome in the 1530s placed James in a powerful bargaining position with the papacy, allowing James to exploit the situation to increase his control over ecclesiastical appointments and the financial dividends from church revenues. Pope Paul III granted him the title of Defender of the Faith in 1537. James maintained diplomatic correspondence with various Irish nobles and chiefs throughout their resistance to Henry VIII in the 1530s, and in 1540, they offered him the kingship of Ireland. A patron of the arts, James spent lavishly on the construction of several royal residences in the High Gothic and Renaissance styles.

James has been described as a vindictive king, whose policies were largely motivated by the pursuit of wealth and a paranoid fear of his nobility, which led to the ruthless appropriation of their lands. He has also been characterised as the "poor man's king" due to his accessibility to the poor and his acting against their oppressors. James died in December 1542 following the Scottish defeat by the English at the Battle of Solway Moss. His only surviving legitimate child, Mary, succeeded him at the age of just six days old.

== Early life ==
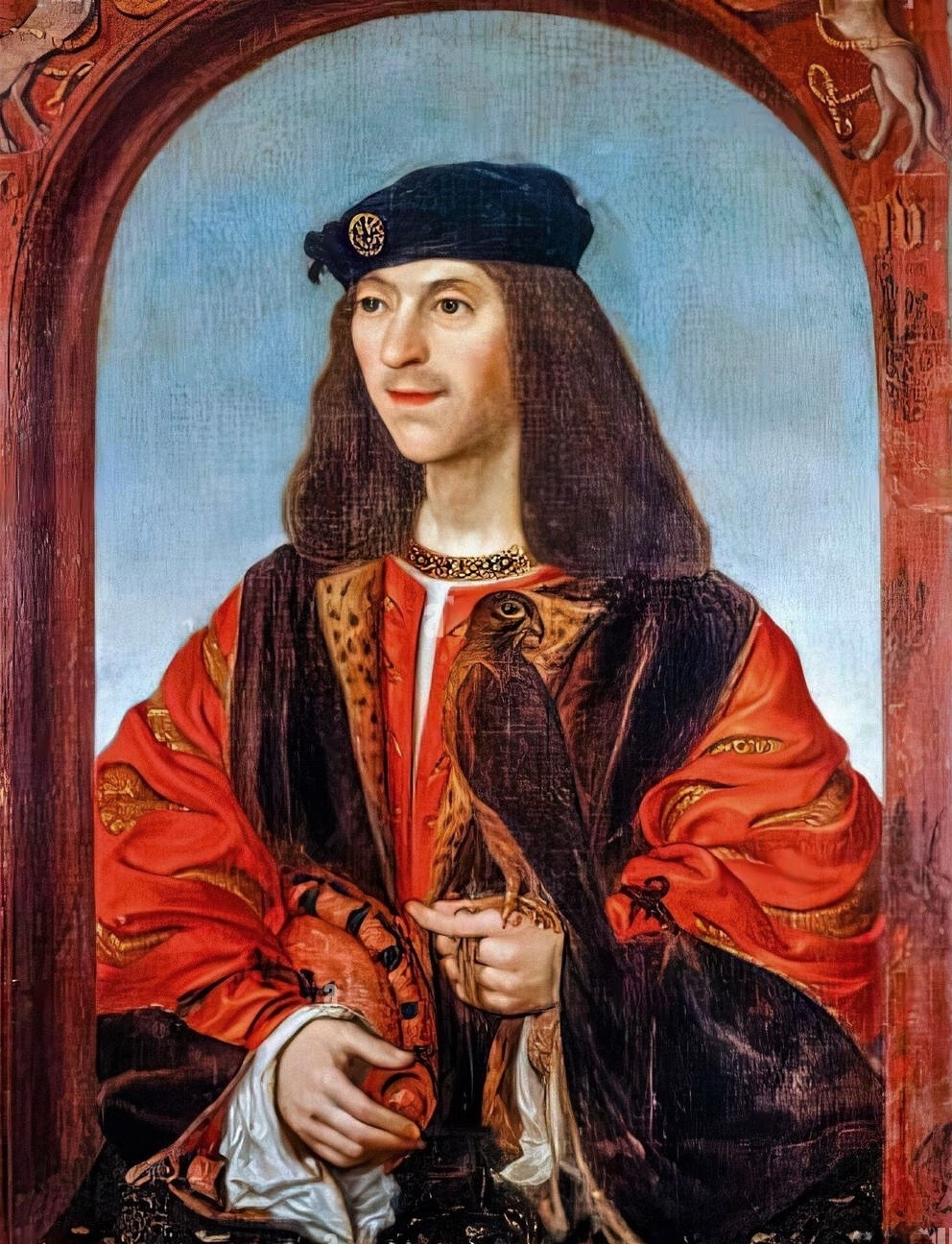
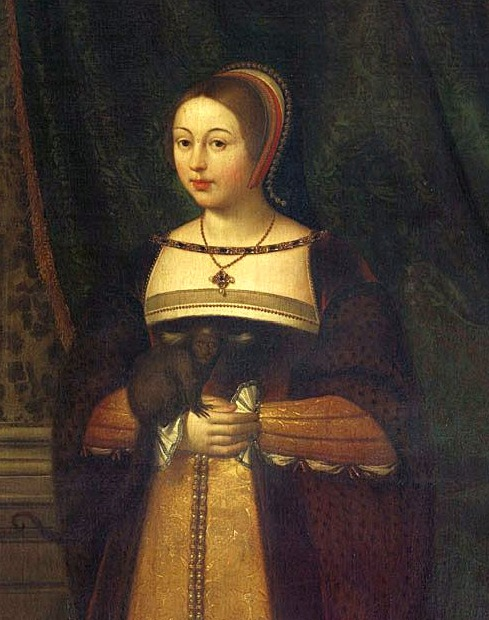
James V's parents, King James IV and Margaret Tudor

James was the third son of King James IV and his wife Margaret Tudor, the eldest daughter of Henry VII of England, and was the only legitimate child of James IV to survive infancy. He was born on 10 April 1512 at Linlithgow Palace and baptised the following day, receiving the title Duke of Rothesay. James became king at just seventeen months old when his father was killed at the Battle of Flodden on 9 September 1513.

=== Struggle for the regency ===
James was crowned in the Chapel Royal at Stirling Castle on 21 September 1513. The nobility accepted Margaret Tudor as regent for her young son, in accordance with the terms of James IV's will, which also stated that Margaret was to retain this position so long as she remained a widow. The long minority of James V would last for nearly fifteen years, with Margaret's position as regent soon challenged by the French-born John, Duke of Albany, who was James V's second cousin and the nearest male heir to the throne after the king and his younger brother, Alexander, Duke of Ross, who was born in April 1514.

In August 1514, Margaret Tudor married Archibald Douglas, 6th Earl of Angus. This marriage was opposed by many among the nobility, who feared the advancement of the Douglases. They sought to deprive Margaret of the regency because she had remarried. The Privy Council removed Margaret from the office of regent and appointed the Duke of Albany to replace her.

== Minority rule ==
=== Albany's regency ===
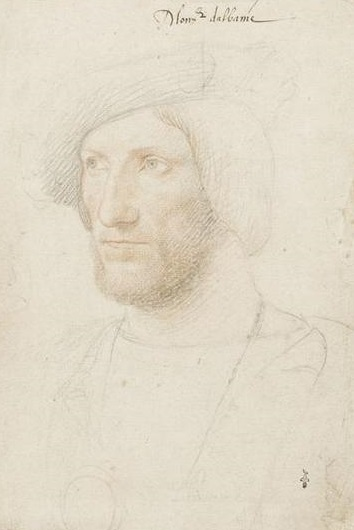
John Stewart, Duke of Albany, regent of James V from 1515 to 1524

Albany arrived at Dumbarton Castle with eight ships and a troop of French soldiers in May 1514. He entered Edinburgh on 26 May, and in July, Parliament confirmed his restoration as Duke of Albany and his position as regent. Albany's noble supporters intended his arrival to bring stable and good government, while Francis I of France sought to use Albany to maintain support for the Auld Alliance with France. The first year of his regency was a period when a vigorous defence of his authority was essential to prevent the crumbling of Scottish government either into anarchy or into English control.

Control of the person of the King was an essential prelude to Albany's attempt to govern, as he was aware from the beginning that his claims to act for the King and with full royal authority depended on the continued goodwill of the King himself, or rather of whoever had control of his person and could therefore claim to speak with his voice. Margaret and Angus were potentially hostile to Albany's intentions, and James V had to be removed from their influence. Albany besieged Stirling Castle and Margaret was forced to relinquish possession of the King and the Duke of Ross. James would not see his mother again for two years. Having lost the regency, her income and control of her sons, Margaret departed from the court in September 1515, fleeing from Linlithgow Palace, where she had gone for her lying in, to Tantallon Castle, where she gave birth to her daughter, Lady Margaret Douglas, in Northumberland.

The birth and long journey left her extremely ill, and she was not told of the death of her second son Alexander in December 1515 until she had recovered her strength. The Earl of Angus made his peace with Albany later in 1516.

A contemporary tribute was paid to the Duke of Albany's success in bringing order and good government to Scotland by Sebastian Giustinian, the Venetian ambassador at Henry VIII's court, who wrote that Scotland, "... was as much under Albany's control as if he were King". In February 1517, James was brought from Stirling to the Palace of Holyroodhouse in Edinburgh, but during an outbreak of plague in the city, he was moved to the care of Antoine d'Arces at nearby rural Craigmillar Castle.

At Stirling, the ten-year-old James had a guard of 20 footmen dressed in his colours, red and yellow. When he went to the park below the Castle, "by secret and in right fair and soft wedder (weather)", six horsemen would scour the countryside two miles roundabout for intruders. Poets wrote nursery rhymes for James and advised him on royal behavior. Although his academic development was effectively cut short under Angus's captivity from 1525 onward, James V had been given a strong grounding by his tutors, including David Lyndsay and Gavin Dunbar. James was taught French and Latin, but as an adult, he spoke halting French, and his need for an interpreter to converse with an Italian bishop suggests that his spoken Latin and Italian were poor. His musical skills were good, although it was said his singing voice was harsh.

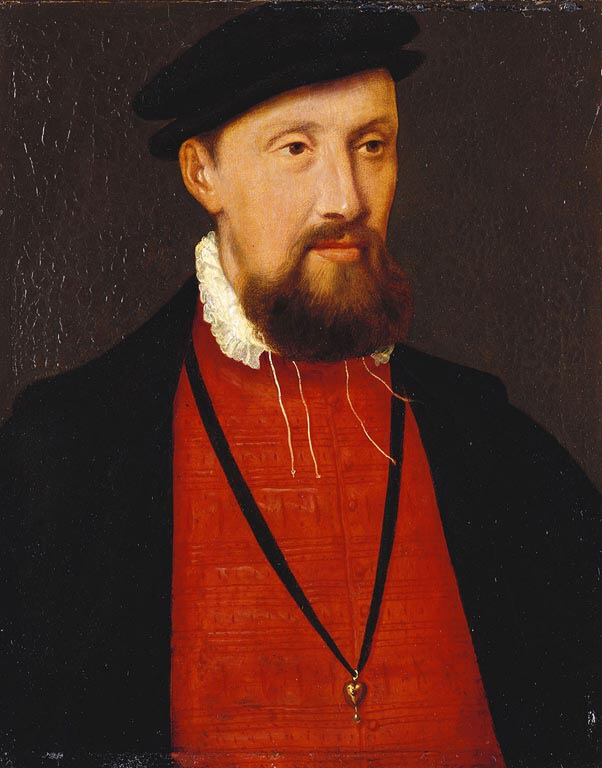
Archibald Douglas, 6th Earl of Angus, James V's step-father

Between 1517 and 1520, Albany sojourned in France, and did not exercise the regency in person, but through his lieutenants including Antoine d'Arces, sieur de la Bastie. On 26 August 1517 Albany and Charles, Duke of Alençon, agreed to the Treaty of Rouen, which renewed the Auld Alliance between Scotland and France and promised a French royal bride for James V. At England's request, Albany was detained in France for four years, and with him absent, Queen Margaret returned to Scotland and sought in vain to regain the regency. Young James V was kept a virtual prisoner by Albany and his lieutenants, and Margaret was allowed to see her son only once between 1516 and the end of Albany's regency in 1524. Following the signing of the Treaty of Bruges (1521) between Henry VIII of England and Holy Roman Emperor Charles V, Francis I allowed the Duke of Albany to return to Scotland to strengthen the Franco-Scottish alliance.

The Treaty of Rouen was ratified, and Madeleine of Valois was suggested as a suitable bride for James V. When the Duke of Albany returned in November 1521 Margaret sided with him against her husband, the Earl of Angus. Albany came to Edinburgh Castle, where James V was kept, and in a public ceremony, the keeper gave him the keys, which he passed to Margaret, who gave them back to Albany, symbolising that the government of Scotland was in his hands. Thus, Albany was able to keep an upper hand in regard to the ambitious Angus. The regent put Angus under charges of high treason in December 1521 and later sent him practically a prisoner to France. In November 1522, Albany took an army to besiege Wark Castle defended by William Lisle but gave up after three days when the weather deteriorated.

=== Margaret's coup ===
In 1524, Albany was finally removed from power in a coup d'état while he was in France. Margaret, with the help of James Hamilton, 1st Earl of Arran, and his followers, brought James V from Stirling to Edinburgh. In August, Parliament declared the regency at an end, and the 12-year-old King James was prematurely "erected" to full kingly powers. In November, Parliament formally recognised Margaret as the chief councillor to the King. Margaret's alliance with the Hamiltons inevitably alienated other noble houses. Henry VIII allowed the Earl of Angus (who Albany had banished) to return to Scotland in 1524, and he entered into an alliance with John Stewart, 3rd Earl of Lennox, an enemy of Margaret and Arran. When Angus arrived in Edinburgh with a large group of armed men, claiming his right to attend Parliament, Margaret ordered cannons to be fired on them from Edinburgh Castle. Parliament subsequently made Angus a Lord of the Articles and a member of the council of regency.

=== Angus captivity ===
A plan was agreed to end the feuding among these opposing groups by allowing each of them in turn to act as host to the young king. However, the plan fell apart in November 1525 when, at the end of his period of custody, Angus refused to surrender the King who, in effect, became a prisoner of the Red Douglases for the next two-and-a-half years. Angus again "erected" James V to full kingly powers, took him on justice ayres and kept him under close supervision. He spoiled the King with various lavish gifts in an attempt to buy his favour and make the detention more tolerable, and when James showed signs of tiring of these gifts, Angus also introduced the adolescent king to the pleasures of the flesh with a succession of prostitutes.

Angus overreached himself, assuming the office of Lord Chancellor and granting his followers almost every lucrative post available in the royal household. While James V clearly enjoyed some aspects of his captivity, he grew to hate his captor. Several attempts were made to free the young king—one by Walter Scott of Branxholme and Buccleuch, who ambushed the King's forces on 25 July 1526 at the Battle of Melrose and was routed off the field. Another attempt later that year, on 4 September at the Battle of Linlithgow Bridge, failed again to relieve the King from the clutches of Angus. In May 1528, James finally escaped from Angus's captivity when he fled from Edinburgh to Stirling in disguise. After meeting with his mother at Stirling, James V re-entered Edinburgh in July with a large army. Summoned for treason, Angus holed himself up in Tantallon Castle until an agreement was reached whereby he was allowed to go into exile in England after surrendering his castles.

== Personal rule ==
Pierre de Ronsard saw James in 1537 when the King was twenty-four and summed up his paradoxical appearance: "La douceur et la force illustroient son visage Si que Venus et Mars en avoient fait partage" – His royal bearing, and vigorous pursuit of virtue, of honour, and love's war, this sweetness and strength illuminate his face, as if he were the child of Venus and Mars.

=== Religion ===
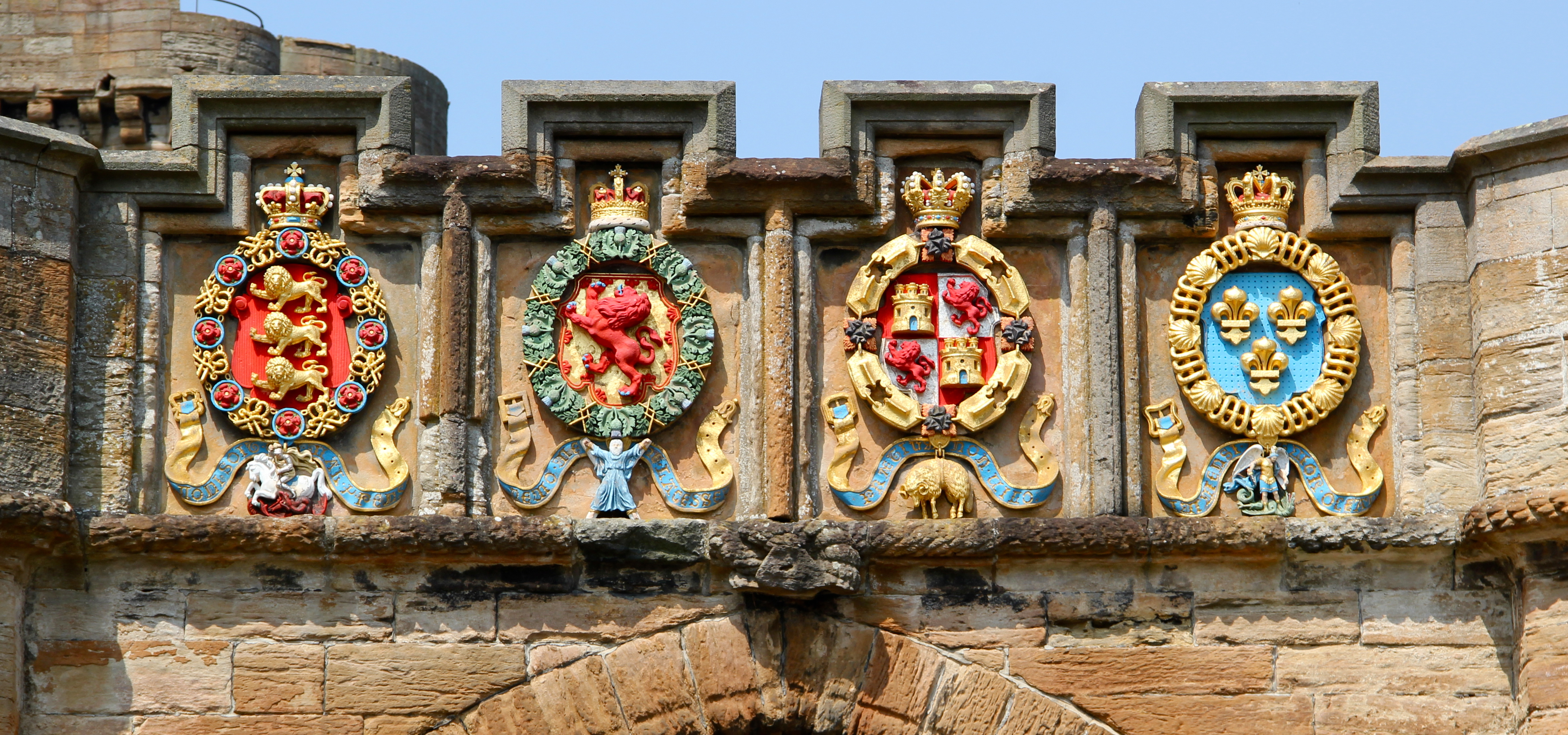
The four European orders of chivalry to which James V belonged — Garter, Thistle, Golden Fleece and St Michael — on the outer gate he built at his birthplace, Linlithgow Palace

The first action James took as king was to remove Angus from the scene. The Douglas family — excluding James's half-sister Margaret, who was already safely in England, innocent of any crime against him (and thus safe from any revenge James took) — were forced into exile and James besieged their castle at Tantallon. He then subdued the Border rebels and the chiefs of the Western Isles. As well as taking advice from his nobility and using the services of the Duke of Albany in France and at Rome, James had a team of professional lawyers and diplomats, including Adam Otterburn and Thomas Erskine of Haltoun. Even his pursemaster and yeoman of the wardrobe, John Tennent of Listonschiels, was sent on an errand to England, though he got a frosty reception.

James increased his income by tightening control over royal estates and from the profits of justice, customs and feudal rights. He also gave his illegitimate sons lucrative benefices, diverting substantial church wealth into his coffers. James spent a large amount of his wealth on building up a collection of tapestries from those inherited from his father. James sailed to France for his first marriage and strengthened the royal fleet. In 1540, he sailed to Kirkwall in Orkney, then Lewis, in his ship the Salamander, first making a will in Leith, knowing this to be "uncertane aventuris." The purpose of this voyage was to show the royal presence and hold regional courts, called "justice ayres."

Domestic and international policy was affected by the Reformation, especially after Henry VIII broke from the Catholic Church. James V did not tolerate heresy and during his reign, a number of outspoken Protestants were persecuted. The most famous of these was Patrick Hamilton, who was burned at the stake as a heretic at St Andrews in 1528. Later in the reign, the English ambassador Ralph Sadler tried to encourage James to close the monasteries and take their revenue so that he would not have to keep sheep like a mean subject. James replied that he had no sheep, he could depend on his god-father the king of France, and it was against reason to close the abbeys that "stand these many years, and God's service maintained and kept in the same, and I might have anything I require of them." Sadler knew that James did farm sheep on his estates.

James recovered money from the church by getting Pope Clement VII to allow him to tax monastic incomes. He sent £50 to Johann Cochlaeus, a German opponent of Martin Luther, after receiving one of his books in 1534. On 19 January 1537, Pope Paul III sent James a blessed sword and hat symbolising his prayers that James would be strengthened against heresies from across the border. These gifts were delivered by the Pope's messenger while James was at Compiègne in France on 25 February 1537.

According to 16th-century writers, his treasurer James Kirkcaldy of Grange tried to persuade James against the persecution of Protestants and to meet Henry VIII at York. James and Henry corresponded about meeting in 1536. Pope Paul III advised James against travelling to England and sent an envoy or nuncio to Scotland to discuss the initiative. Although Henry VIII sent his tapestries to York in September 1541 ahead of a meeting, James did not come. The lack of commitment to this meeting was regarded by English observers as a sign that Scotland was firmly allied to France and Catholicism, particularly by the influence of Cardinal Beaton, Keeper of the Privy Seal, and as a cause for war.

In 1540, Irish nobles and chiefs offered James the kingship of Ireland, as a further challenge to Henry VIII.

=== Building ===
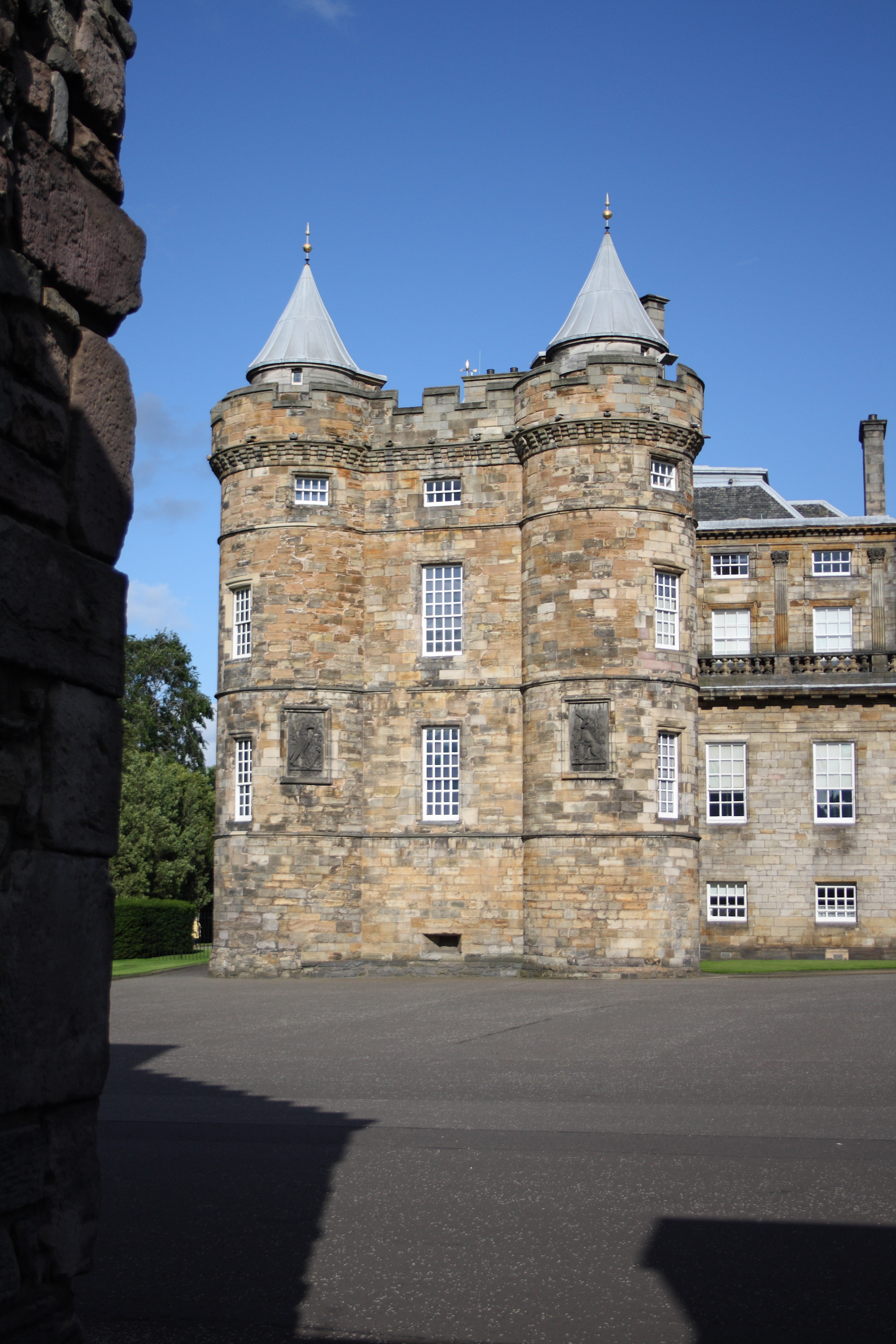
The James V Tower at the Palace of Holyroodhouse

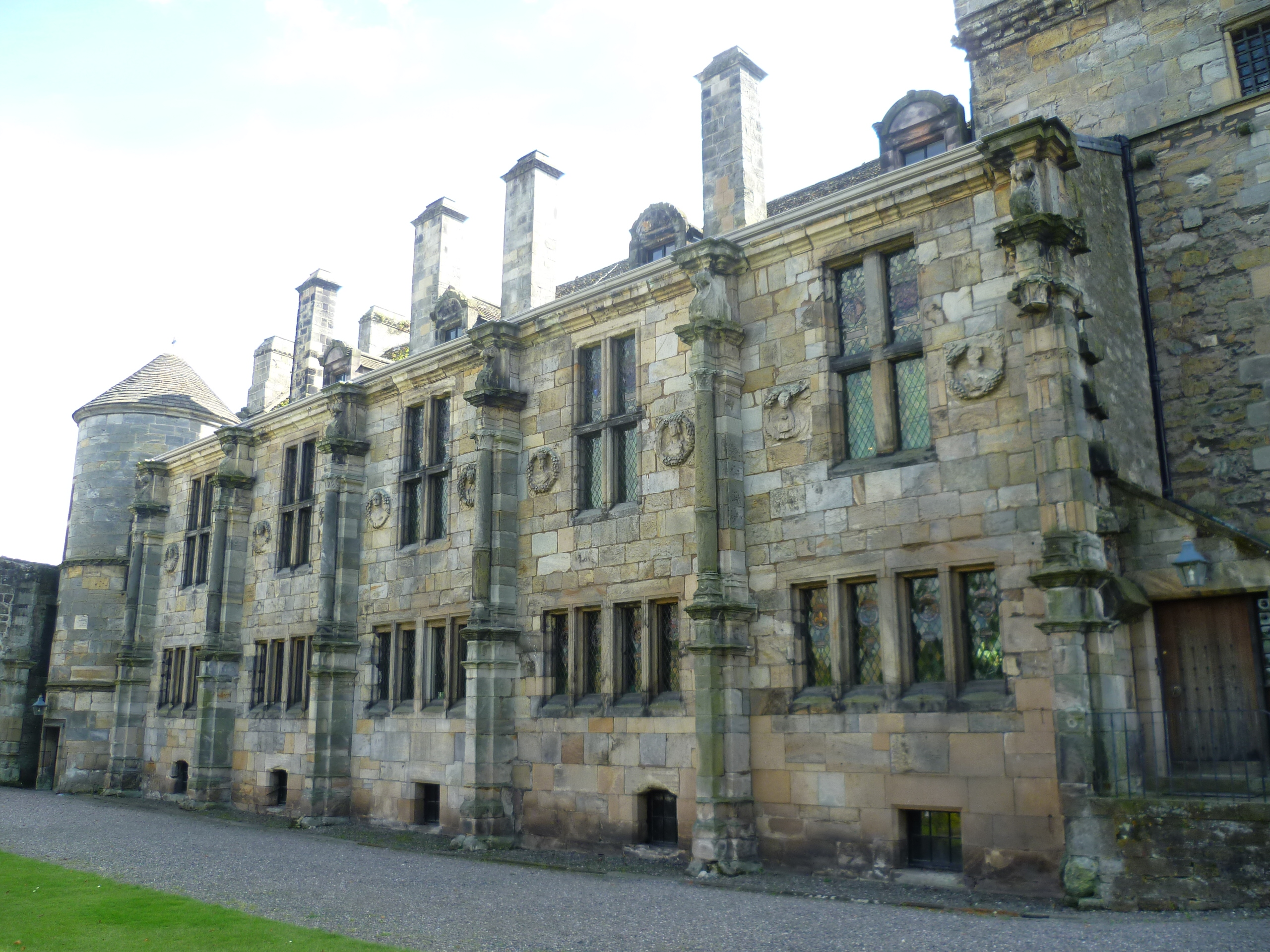
Façade of Falkland Palace in the French Renaissance style

James V spent a large amount of money (at least £41,000) during his adult reign on extensively remodelling all the major residences and several minor ones, including the construction of new structures, with the most significant work focused on Falkland Palace and Stirling Castle. Early in his personal rule, James began the construction of the present Late Gothic tower at the north-west corner of the Palace of Holyroodhouse, which provided new royal lodgings on the first and second floors, and a high degree of security. A new west front was also built.

At Linlithgow Palace, James closed off the original east entranceway and formed a new access from the south, including an inner gatehouse and an outer entrance gate decorated with the carved arms of chivalric orders, the Garter, Golden Fleece, Saint Michael, with the Thistle badge. The three-tiered octagonal fountain topped by an imperial crown was built in 1538 as the centrepiece of the courtyard.

At Falkland Palace, James V extended his father's buildings in French Renaissance style between 1537 and 1541 and built a real tennis court in the garden in 1541. The tennis court survives and is the oldest in the United Kingdom. James built a new entrance tower in the south range, and the inner courtyard facades of the east and south ranges built in 1537 and 1539 are the earliest examples of Renaissance architecture in the British Isles. The largest of James V's building projects was the construction of the Royal Palace at Stirling Castle, built between 1538 and 1540, with its Renaissance facades and the north, east and south quarters housing the king's and queen's apartments. Work was also carried out at Tantallon Castle, Blackness Castle and Hermitage Castle.

== Marriages ==
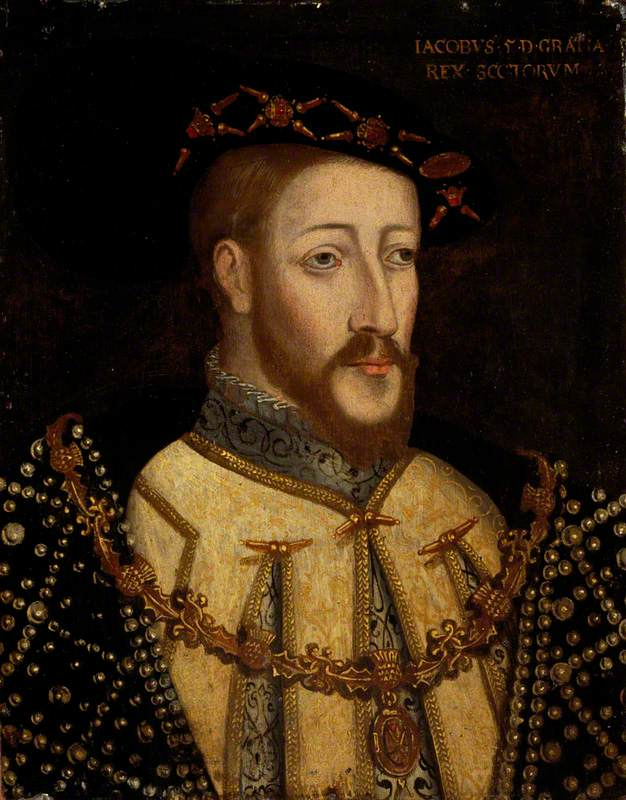
Portrait of James V

As early as August 1517, a clause of the Treaty of Rouen provided that if the Auld Alliance between France and Scotland was maintained, James should have a daughter of Francis I of France as a bride. Yet, by the 1520s, Francis's two surviving daughters were too frail or too young. In 1528, the Holy Roman Emperor Charles V and the English diplomat Thomas Magnus both raised the possibility of a marriage between the King and his cousin, Princess Mary, while that same year, Margaret of Austria, Charles V's aunt, suggested that James should marry Charles's sister, Mary of Austria. Charles V also proposed James marrying his niece, Maria of Portugal. Perhaps to remind Francis I of his obligations, James V in 1529 began negotiations for his marriage elsewhere, sending the Duke of Albany to Rome to negotiate a marriage to Catherine de' Medici, the niece of Pope Clement VII. By 1533, there was discussion of James marrying one of his second cousins, Christina or Dorothea, the daughters of Christian II of Denmark, while in 1534, Margaret of Valois-Angoulême, sister of Francis I, suggested her sister-in-law Isabella.

In December 1534, Francis I insisted that his eldest daughter Madeleine's health was too poor for marriage, suggesting that James V instead should marry Mary of Bourbon, daughter of the Duke of Vendôme, to fulfil the Treaty of Rouen. Again, the Duke of Albany briefly entertained the idea that James might marry Christina of Denmark, and the King halted progress on the marriage negotiations. There was also an investigation into the possibility of James marrying his former mistress, Margaret Erskine, before the negotiations resumed again, and in March 1536, a final contract was made for Mary of Bourbon to marry James V. She would have a dowry as if she were a French princess, and Francis I consolidated the agreement by sending James the collar of the Order of Saint Michael as a token of his affection.

=== Marriage to Madeleine of Valois ===
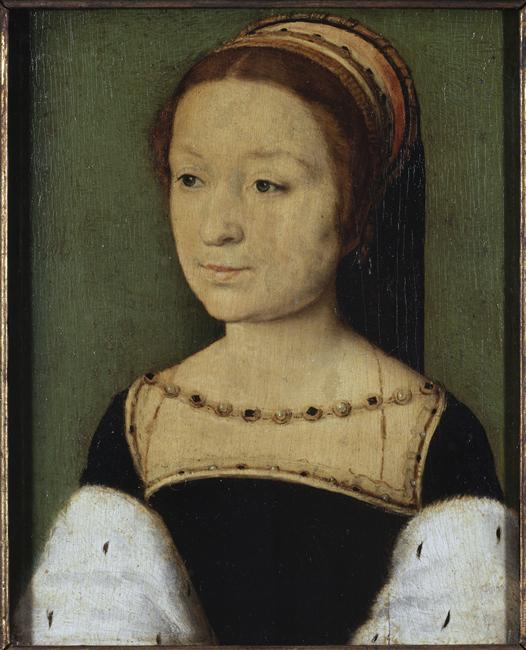
Portrait of Madeleine of Valois by Corneille de Lyon

James decided to travel to France to meet his prospective bride in person. He sailed from Kirkcaldy on 1 September 1536, with the earls of Arran, Argyll and Rothes, Lord Fleming, David Beaton and a force of 500 men in a fleet of six ships, using the Mary Willoughby as his flagship. Before his departure, James appointed six vice-regents to govern Scotland in his absence, Gavin Dunbar, Archbishop of Glasgow (the Lord Chancellor), James Beaton, Archbishop of St Andrews, the earls of Huntly, Montrose, and Eglinton, and Lord Maxwell. In the event, James V would be away from Scotland for eight months, becoming the first Scottish king to voluntarily remain away from his realm since David II almost two hundred years earlier.

Arriving at Dieppe on 8 September, the Scots travelled to the Duke of Vendôme's court at Saint-Quentin. James V met Mary of Bourbon, according to several accounts in disguise with his servant John Tennent, but was not impressed. He then travelled south to the French court at the Château d'Amboise, where he met Madeleine, and again pressed Francis for her hand in marriage. Fearing the harsh climate of Scotland would prove fatal to his daughter's already failing health, Francis initially refused to permit the marriage, but the couple persuaded Francis to reluctantly grant permission to their marriage. The marriage contract was signed in November, with Francis I granting Madeleine a dowry of 100,000 écu, and a further 30,000 francs a year for James.

James V renewed the Auld Alliance and fulfilled the terms of the Treaty of Rouen on 1 January 1537 by marrying Madeleine at Notre-Dame de Paris. James received papal approval in the form of the Blessed sword and hat, and was granted the title of Defender of the Faith by Pope Paul III on 19 January 1537, symbolising the hopes of the papacy that he would resist the path that his uncle Henry VIII had followed. After months of festivities and celebrations, and visits to Chantilly, Compiègne and Rouen (where Madeleine fell ill), the royal couple embarked for Scotland in May 1537, arriving at Leith on 19 May. Madeleine wrote to her father from Edinburgh on 8 June 1537 saying that she was better and her symptoms had diminished. However, a month later, on 7 July 1537, Queen Madeleine died in her husband's arms at Holyrood Palace of tuberculosis. James V wrote to Francis I to inform him of what had happened, saying that if it were not for the fact that he was relying on the French king to remain his "good father", he would be in even greater pain. The Queen was interred in Holyrood Abbey in Edinburgh.

=== Marriage to Mary of Guise ===
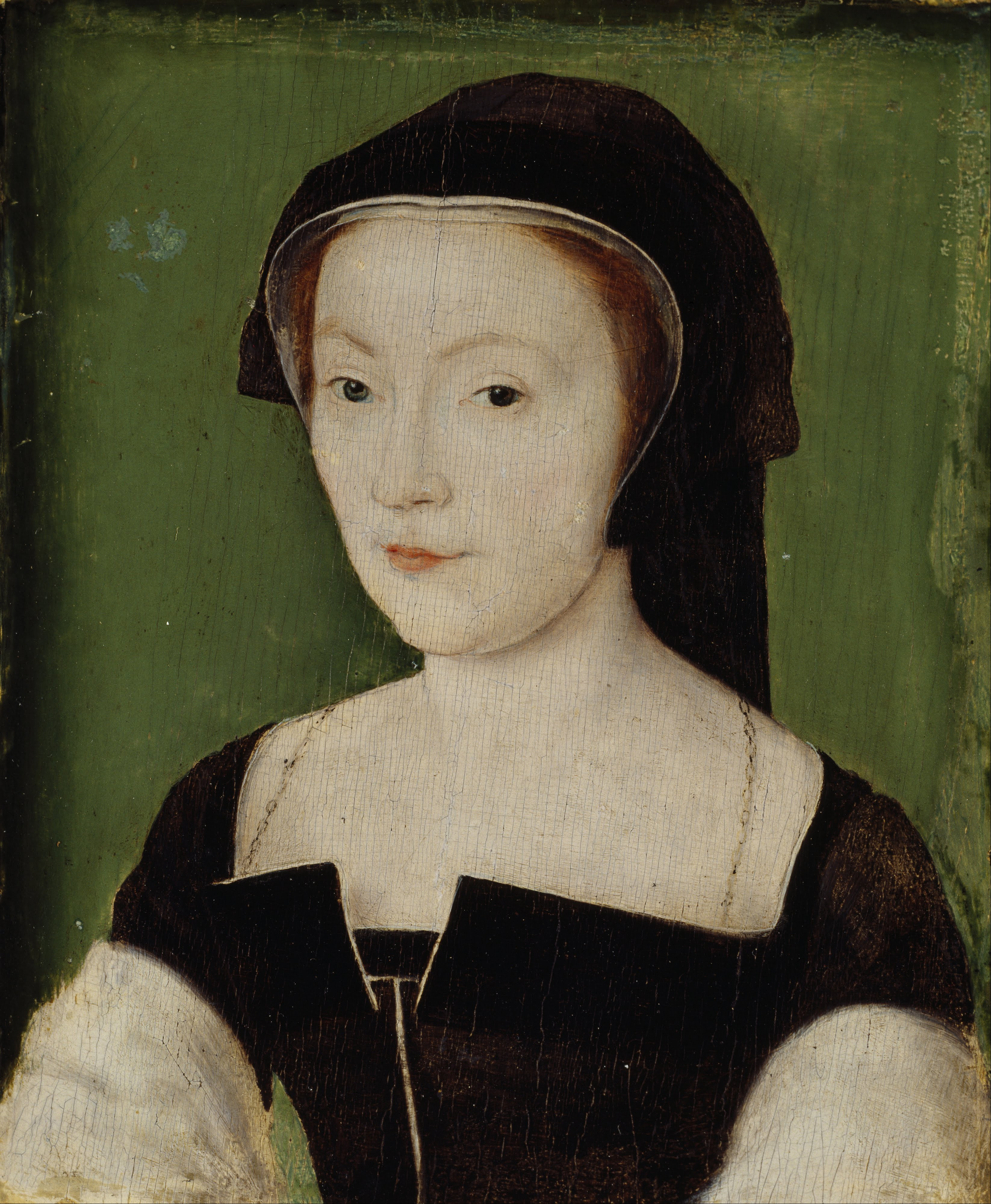
Portrait of Mary of Guise attributed to Corneille de Lyon, c. 1537

Following Madeleine's death, James V's thoughts turned to a second French bride to further the interests of the Franco-Scottish alliance. David Beaton was sent to France to persuade Francis I to agree to James marrying his only surviving daughter, Margaret. Francis offered Mary of Guise as a bride instead. The daughter of Claude, Duke of Guise, Mary had recently been widowed by the death of her husband, Louis II d'Orléans, Duke of Longueville. David Beaton wrote to James V from Lyon in October 1537 that Mary was "stark (strong), well complexioned, and fit to travel", and that her father was "marvellous desirous of the expedition and hasty end of the matter," and had already consulted with his brother, Antoine, Duke of Lorraine, and Mary herself. The marriage contract was finalised in January 1538, with James V receiving a dowry of 150,000 livres. As was customary, if the King died first, Mary would retain for her lifetime her jointure houses of Falkland Palace, Stirling Castle, Dingwall Castle and Threave Castle, along with the rentals of the earldoms of Fife, Strathearn, Ross and Orkney, and the lordships of Galloway, Ardmannoch and the Isles.

The proxy wedding of James V and Mary of Guise was held on 9 May 1538 at the Château de Châteaudun. Some 2,000 Scottish lords and barons came from Scotland aboard a fleet of ships under Lord Maxwell to attend, with Lord Maxwell standing as proxy for James V. Mary departed from Le Havre on 10 June 1538 and landed in Scotland 6 days later at Crail in Fife. She was formally received by the king at St Andrews a few days later amid pageants and plays performed in her honour, and James and Mary were married in person at St Andrews Cathedral on 18 June 1538. James's mother Margaret Tudor wrote to Henry VIII in July, "I trust she will prove a wise Princess. I have been much in her company, and she bears herself very honourably to me, with very good entertaining." James and Mary had two sons: James, Duke of Rothesay (born 22 May 1540 at St Andrews), and Robert (or Arthur), Duke of Albany (born and baptised on 12 April 1541); however, both died on 21 April 1541, when James was nearly one year old and Robert (or Arthur) was nine days old. Mary's mother, Antoinette de Bourbon, wrote that the couple were still young and should hope for more children. The third and last child of the union was a daughter, Mary, who was born on 8 December 1542.

== Outside interests ==
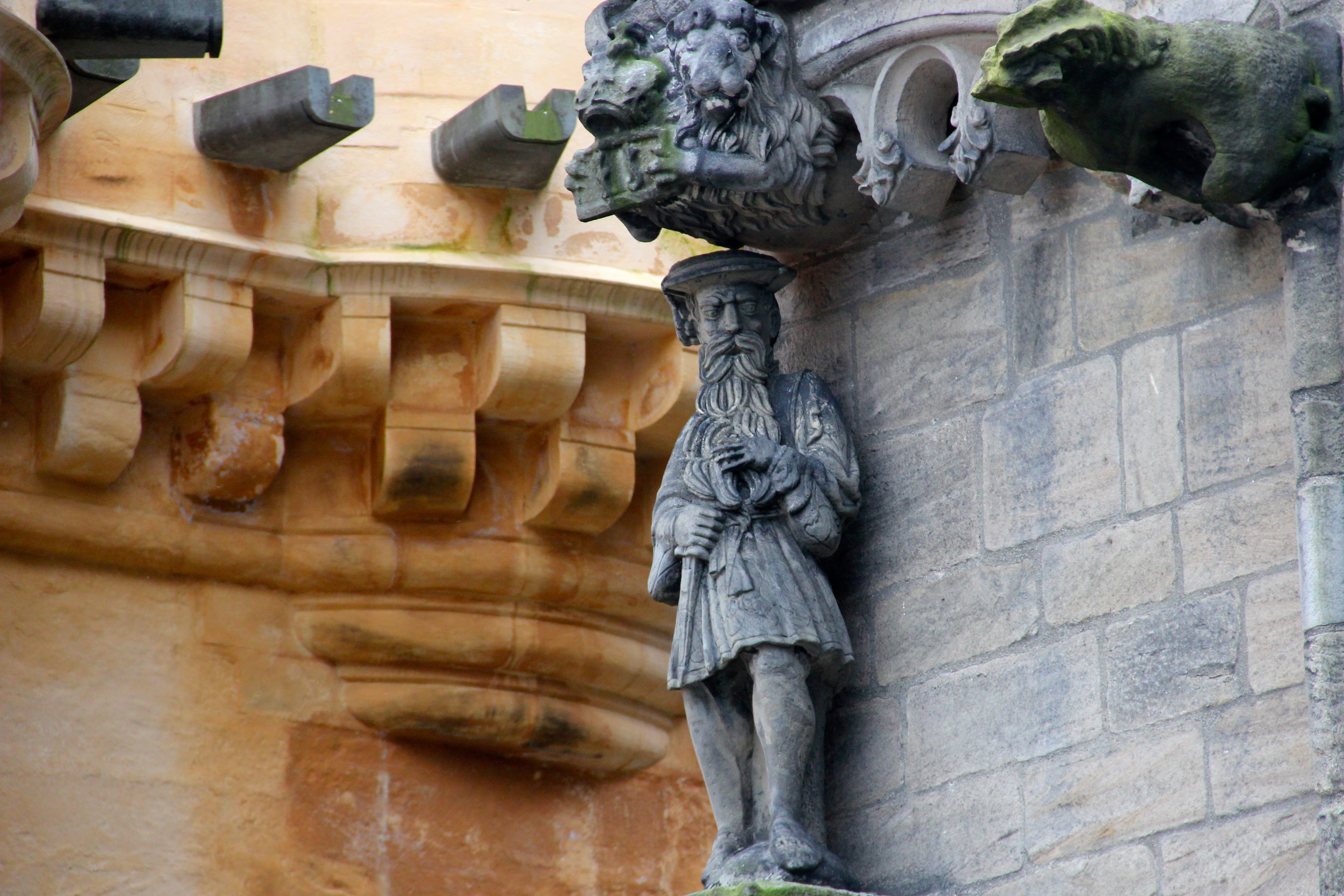
Statue at Stirling Castle, said to depict the Gudeman of Ballengeich

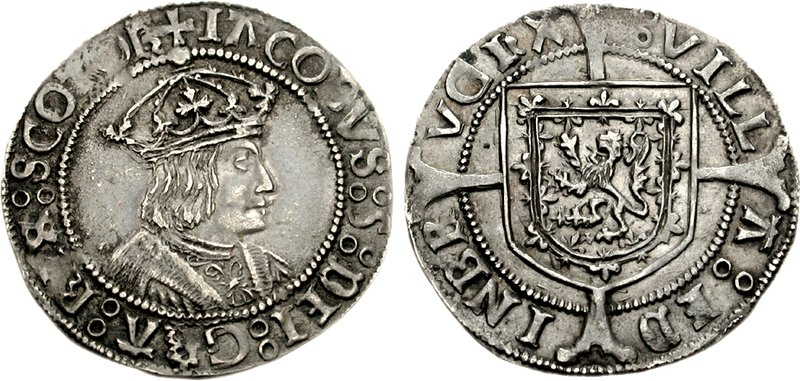
Groat of James V, Edinburgh mint, 1526 × 1539

According to legend, James was nicknamed "King of the Commons" as he would sometimes travel around Scotland disguised as a common man, describing himself as the "Gudeman of Ballengeich". ("Gudeman" means "landlord" or "farmer", and "Ballengeich" was the nickname of a road next to Stirling Castle — meaning "windy pass" in Gaelic). One traditional ballad, The Jolly Beggar, is considered by some to refer to his activities.

James was a keen lute player. In 1562, Sir Thomas Wood reported that James had "a singular good ear and could sing that he had never seen before" (sight-read), but his voice was "rawky" and "harske." At court, James maintained a band of Italian musicians who adopted the name Drummond. These were joined for the winter of 1529/30 by a musician and diplomat sent by the Duke of Milan, Thomas de Averencia de Brescia, probably a lutenist. The historian Andrea Thomas makes a useful distinction between the loud music provided at ceremonies and processionals and instruments employed for more private occasions or worship, the music fyne described by Helena Mennie Shire. This quieter music included a consort of viols played by four Frenchmen led by Jacques Columbell. It seems certain that David Peebles wrote music for James V and probable that the Scottish composer Robert Carver was in royal employ, though evidence is lacking.

As a patron of poets and authors, James supported William Stewart and John Bellenden, the son of his nurse, who translated the Latin History of Scotland compiled in 1527 by Hector Boece into verse and prose. Sir David Lindsay of the Mount, the Lord Lyon, head of the Lyon Court and diplomat, was a prolific poet. He produced an interlude at Linlithgow Palace thought to be a version of his play The Thrie Estaitis in 1540. James also attracted the attention of international authors. The French poet Pierre de Ronsard, who had been a page of Madeleine of Valois, offered unqualified praise:

Son port estoit royal, son regard vigoureux
De vertus, et de l'honneur, et guerre amoureux
La douceur et la force illustroient son visage
Si que Venus et Mars en avoient fait partage.

His royal bearing, and vigorous pursuit
of virtue, of honour, and love's war,
this sweetness and strength illuminate his face,
as if he were the child of Venus and Mars.

When James married Mary of Guise, Giovanni Ferrerio, an Italian scholar who had been at Kinloss Abbey in Scotland, dedicated to the couple a new edition of his work On the True Significance of Comets against the Vanity of Astrologers. Like Henry VIII, James employed many foreign artisans and craftsmen in order to enhance the prestige of his renaissance court. Robert Lindsay of Pitscottie listed their professions:

he plenished the country with all kind of craftsmen out of other countries, as French-men, Spaniards, Dutch men, and Englishmen, which were all cunning craftsmen, every man for his own hand. Some were gunners, cunning wrights and carvers, painters, masons, smiths, harness-makers (armourers), tapesters, broudinstars (embroiderers), tailors, cunning chirugeons (surgeons), pottingaris (apothecaries), with all other kind of craftsmen to apparel his palaces.

One technological initiative was a special mill for polishing armour at Holyroodhouse next to his mint. The mill had a pole drive 32 feet long powered by horses. Mary of Guise's mother Antoinette of Bourbon sent him an armourer who made steel plates for his jousting saddles in October 1538 and delivered a skirt of plate armour in February 1540. In the same year, for his wife's coronation, the treasurer's accounts record that James personally devised fireworks made by his master gunners. His goldsmith John Mosman renovated the crown jewels for the occasion. When James took steps to suppress the circulation of slanderous ballads and rhymes against Henry VIII, Henry sent Fulke ap Powell, Lancaster Herald, to give thanks and to make arrangements for the present of a lion for James's menagerie of exotic pets.

== War with England and death ==
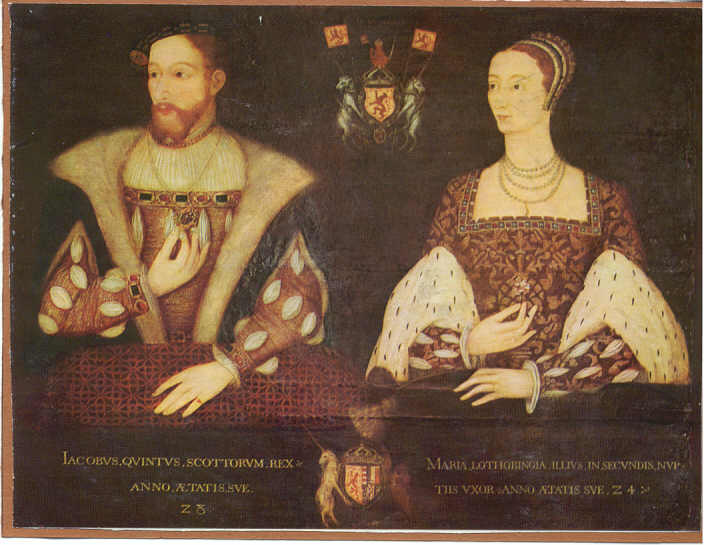
Portrait of James V and Mary of Guise, anonymous artist, c. 1542, at Falkland Palace

The death of James's mother in 1541 removed any incentive for peace with England, and war broke out. Initially, the Scots won a victory at the Battle of Haddon Rig in August 1542. The Imperial ambassador in London, Eustace Chapuys, wrote on 2 October that the Scottish ambassadors ruled out a conciliatory meeting between James and Henry VIII in England until the pregnant Mary of Guise delivered her child. Henry would not accept this condition and mobilised his army against Scotland. James was with his army at Lauder on 31 October 1542. Although he hoped to invade England, his nobles were reluctant. He returned to Edinburgh, on the way writing a letter in French to his wife from Falahill mentioning he had three days of illness. On 24 November, his army suffered a serious defeat at the Battle of Solway Moss. Following a few days spent at Linlithgow Palace with Queen Mary, who was in the final stages of her pregnancy, on 6 December, James travelled to Falkland Palace, where he soon took ill.

Although James V's army had been beaten at Solway Moss, it was neither a personal humiliation for the King (who was not there) nor the result of noble disaffection. In fact, James had substantial support for his war policy and early in December, he had made plans to renew the conflict with England. James was on his deathbed at Falkland when news arrived from Linlithgow that the Queen had given birth to a daughter. According to John Knox, on hearing of the birth of his daughter, the King said "It cam wi' a lass, and it will gang wi' a lass" (meaning "It began with a girl and it will end with a girl"). This could refer to the Stewart dynasty's accession to the throne through Marjorie Bruce, daughter of Robert the Bruce. The prophecy could have been intended to express his belief that his new-born daughter Mary would be the last of the Stewart monarchs. In fact, the last Stewart monarch was female: Anne, Queen of Great Britain. James V died at Falkland Palace on 14 December 1542, aged 30. The King had been ill on a number of occasions during the previous decade: in 1533 "of a sore fois (face)"; in 1534 of the "pox, and fevir contenew"; in Paris in 1536; and in 1540, when he wrote to his wife to say that he had been as ill as he had ever been in his life, but was now recovered. Evidently, his immune system had not recovered, as he had been ill again in November 1542. It is likely that James V died from cholera or dysentery, rather than shame or despair brought on by the news of Solway Moss.

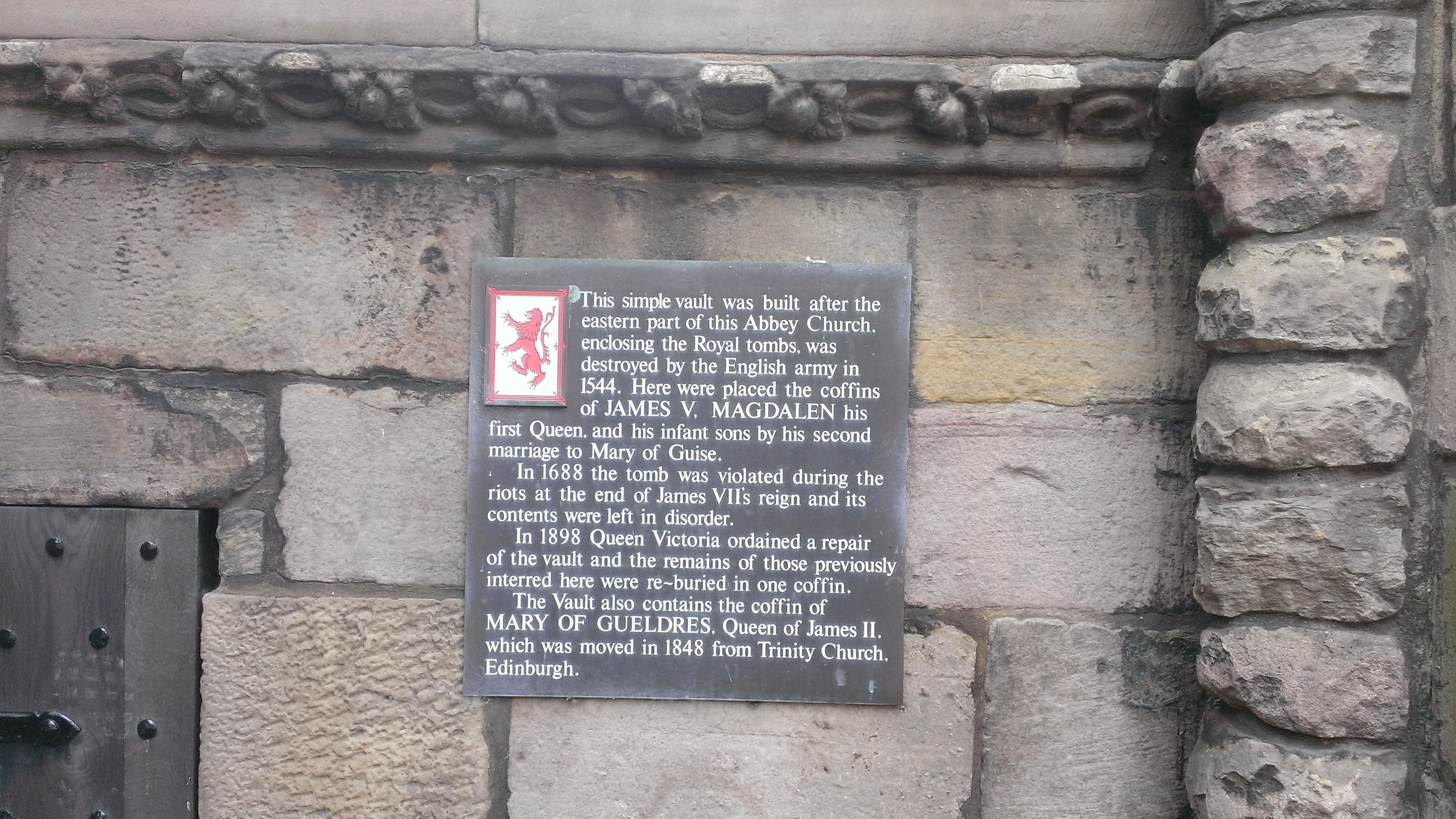
The Royal Vault in the ruins of Holyrood Abbey, which contains the remains of James V

James was succeeded by his infant daughter, Mary, Queen of Scots. On 7 January 1543, the King's body was conveyed from Falkland to the Forth ferry at Kinghorn before being transported to Edinburgh, escorted by a funeral cortege, and accompanied by Cardinal Beaton, the Earls of Arran, Argyll, Rothes, Marischal and other nobles. James V was buried on 8 January at Holyrood Abbey, next to his first wife, Madeleine, and his two sons. A stone tomb was erected, on which Andrew Mansioun carved a lion, a crown and an eighteen-foot-long inscription in Roman letters. Alms were distributed to the poor of Edinburgh who had been present at the soul-Mass and dirge performed for the King.

During the Rough Wooing, the invading English armies inflicted structural damage on Holyrood Abbey in 1544 and 1547, destroying James V's tomb. In subsequent decades, the rule of James V enjoyed a reputation for financial stability and security, cited by the Gowrie Regime in 1582, and by the advisers of James VI in 1591. This reflects an expansion of the legal system which allowed an increase in crown revenue.

James was the last monarch to die in Scotland until 8 September 2022, when Queen Elizabeth II died at Balmoral Castle in Aberdeenshire, 480 years later. Days later, her body was carried through the streets of Edinburgh, the first time that a royal cortege had passed through the city since James V's burial.

== Issue ==
=== Legitimate issue ===
Name	Birth	Death	Notes
By Madeleine of France
no issue
By Mary of Guise
James, Duke of Rothesay	22 May 1540	21 April 1541	
Arthur or Robert, Duke of Albany	12 April 1541	20 April 1541	His birth was celebrated by a procession of craft banners in Edinburgh.
Mary, Queen of Scots	8 December 1542	8 February 1587	Married, firstly, Francis II of France; no issue. Married, secondly, Henry Stuart, Lord Darnley, and had issue (the future James VI and I). Married, thirdly, James Hepburn, 4th Earl of Bothwell; no issue.

=== Illegitimate issue ===
Name	Birth	Death	Notes
By Elizabeth Shaw
James Stewart, Commendator of Kelso and Melrose	c. 1529	1557	His daughter, Marjorie, married the half-nephew of his brother, Robert Stewart, 1st Earl of Orkney. Some sources, however, state he had no issue.
By Margaret Erskine
James Stewart, 1st Earl of Moray	c. 1531	23 January 1570	Prior of St Andrews; Regent of Scotland, for his nephew James VI and I. Married Agnes Keith, Countess of Moray, and had issue. He was the first head of government to be assassinated with a firearm.
By Elizabeth or Helenor Stewart
Adam Stewart, Prior of Perth	?	20 June 1575	Married Janet Ruthven (d. January 1606) and had issue. In June 1596, James VI gave £200 to Adam's son, James Stewart, for his travelling expenses in foreign countries.
By Christine Barclay
James Stewart	?	?	Known as tertius, the third son named James. He may have died in infancy.
By Elizabeth Carmichael
John Stewart, Commendator of Coldingham	c. 1531	November 1563	Married Jean Hepburn and had issue including Francis Stewart, 5th Earl of Bothwell. Also had illegitimate issue.
By Elizabeth Bethune
Lady Jean Stewart	c. 1533	7 January 1587/88	Married Archibald Campbell, 5th Earl of Argyll; no issue.
By Euphame Elphinstone
Robert Stewart, 1st Earl of Orkney and Lord of Zetland (Commendator of Holyrood)	c. 1533	4 February 1593	Married Jean Kennedy and had issue. Also had illegitimate issue.
Unknown mother
Robert Stewart	?	1581	Prior of Whithorn. Known as Robert secundus, the identity of his mother is unknown.

== Fictional portrayals ==
James V has been depicted in historical novels, poems, short stories and one notable opera. They include the following:

- Scott, Walter (1810), The Lady of the Lake, a Romantic narrative poem set in the Trossachs. James initially appears incognito. The poem was tremendously influential in the nineteenth century and inspired the Highland Revival. James also features in Scott's Tales of a Grandfather. Lady of the Lake was turned into a stage musical that included the song Hail to the Chief, the song played every time the President of the United States appears at a public gathering.
- "Johnnie Armstrong", a traditional ballad relating the story of Scottish raider and folk hero Johnnie Armstrong of Gilnockie, who was captured and hanged by King James V in 1530.
- Rossini, Gioachino (1819), La Donna del Lago, an opera based on Scott's poem. Sung in Italian, James V appears as "Giacomo V".
- Gibbon, Charles (1881), The Braes of Yarrow. The novels features Scotland in the aftermath of the Battle of Flodden, covering events to 1514. Margaret Tudor, "Boy-King" James V and Archibald Douglas, 5th Earl of Angus, are prominently featured.
- Barr, Robert (1902), A Prince of Good Fellows. James is the titular prince and the main character. He is depicted as an "adventure-loving persona".
- Gunn, John (1913), The Fight at Summerdale. The novel depicts Orkney, Edinburgh and Normandy in the 16th century. James V "appears more than once" in the various chapters.
- Knipe, John (1921), The Hour Before the Dawn. Depicts events "just before" and "after" the death of James V. James V, Mary of Guise and David Beaton are prominently depicted.

== See also ==
- Janet Douglas, Lady Glamis

== Sources ==
This article incorporates text from a publication now in the public domain: Wood, James, ed. (1907). "James V". The Nuttall Encyclopædia. London and New York: Frederick Warne.

- Bingham, Caroline (1971). James V King of Scots. London: Collins. ISBN 0-0021-1390-2.
- Cameron, Jamie (1998). Macdougall, Norman (ed.). James V: The Personal Rule, 1528–1542. The Stewart Dynasty in Scotland. East Linton: Tuckwell Press. ISBN 978-1-8623-2015-4.
- Dawson, Jane (2007). Scotland Reformed 1488–1587. The New Edinburgh History of Scotland. Vol. 6. Edinburgh: Edinburgh University Press. ISBN 978-0-7486-1455-4.
- Donaldson, Gordon (1965). Scotland: James V to James VII. The Edinburgh History of Scotland. Vol. III. Edinburgh: Oliver & Boyd. ISBN 978-0-9018-2485-1.
- Dunbar, John (1999). Scottish Royal Palaces. Tuckwell Press. ISBN 1--86232-042-X.
- Ellis, Henry (1829). "A Household book of James V". Archaeologia. Vol. 22. pp. 1–12.
- Emond, Ken (2019). The Minority of James V: Scotland in Europe, 1513–1528. Edinburgh: John Donald. ISBN 978-1-9109-0031-4.
- Hadley Williams, Janet (1996). Stewart Style 1513–1542. Edinburgh: Tuckwell Press. ISBN 1-8984-1082-8.
- Hadley Williams, Janet (2000). Sir David Lyndsay, Selected Poems. Glasgow: ASLS. ISBN 0-9488-7746-4.
- Harrison, John G. (2008). Wardrobe Inventories of James V: British Library MS Royal 18 C (PDF). Historic Scotland.
- Nield, Jonathan (1968). A Guide to the Best Historical Novels and Tales. Ayer Publishing. ISBN 978-0-8337-2509-7.
- Ross, Stewart (1993). The Stewart Dynasty. Nairn: Thomas and Lochar. ISBN 978-1-8998-6343-3.
- Thomas, Andrea (2005). Princelie Majestie: The Court of James V of Scotland. Edinburgh: John Donald. ISBN 0--85976-611-X.
- Wormald, Jenny (1981), Court, Kirk, and Community: Scotland 1470–1625, The New History of Scotland, vol. 4, Edinburgh: Edinburgh University Press, ISBN 0-7486-0276-3

James V House of Stewart Born: 10 April 1512 Died: 14 December 1542
Regnal titles
Preceded by James IV	King of Scotland; 1513–1542	Succeeded by Mary
Peerage of Scotland
Vacant Title last held by James (IV)	Duke of Rothesay; 1511–1513	Vacant Title next held by James
