= Treaty of Rouen (1517) =

1517 treaty between France and Scotland

The Treaty of Rouen was signed on 26 August 1517 between France and Scotland. The treaty provided the renewal of the Auld Alliance in terms of mutual military assistance and reciprocal aid. Provision was made for the future marriage of James V of Scotland to a daughter of Francis I if circumstances allowed.

== Negotiations ==
The treaty was negotiated and signed by Duke of Albany and Charles, Duke of Alençon. Gavin Douglas, the Bishop of Dunkeld, advised during negotiations at Rouen. The issue of the royal marriage was conditional and secondary to the main matter of the treaty which detailed undertakings and troop numbers to be provided in the case of English invasion of France or Scotland. Aid from France was including financial support (100 000 "louis soleil") and a contingent of 1500 landsknechts, 500 foot soldiers and 200 archers. Scotland would send 6000 men. At the time of the treaty Francis's daughter was promised elsewhere.

== Effects ==
John Stewart, Duke of Albany, as Regent of Albany, ratified the treaty in 1521. In the renewed treaty, the name of Madeleine of Valois was included as the potential bride of James V.

In May 1524, when John Stewart, Duke of Albany made plans to return to France, and effectively gave up the Regency of Scotland, he told the assembled lords at Edinburgh's Tolbooth that they should keep the "bande that was made in Rowane", and not make a new treaty with England.

In 1535, James V was contracted to Mary of Bourbon, as if she were a French Princess under the 1517 Treaty, and on 1 January 1537 he married Madeleine of Valois at Notre-Dame de Paris. After her death, James V negotiated to marry the widowed Mary of Guise, and Francis I of France agreed that he would "accept her as his daughter and give her for the same".

== See also ==
- List of treaties
