= Mary Rose =

English Tudor warship (1511–1545)

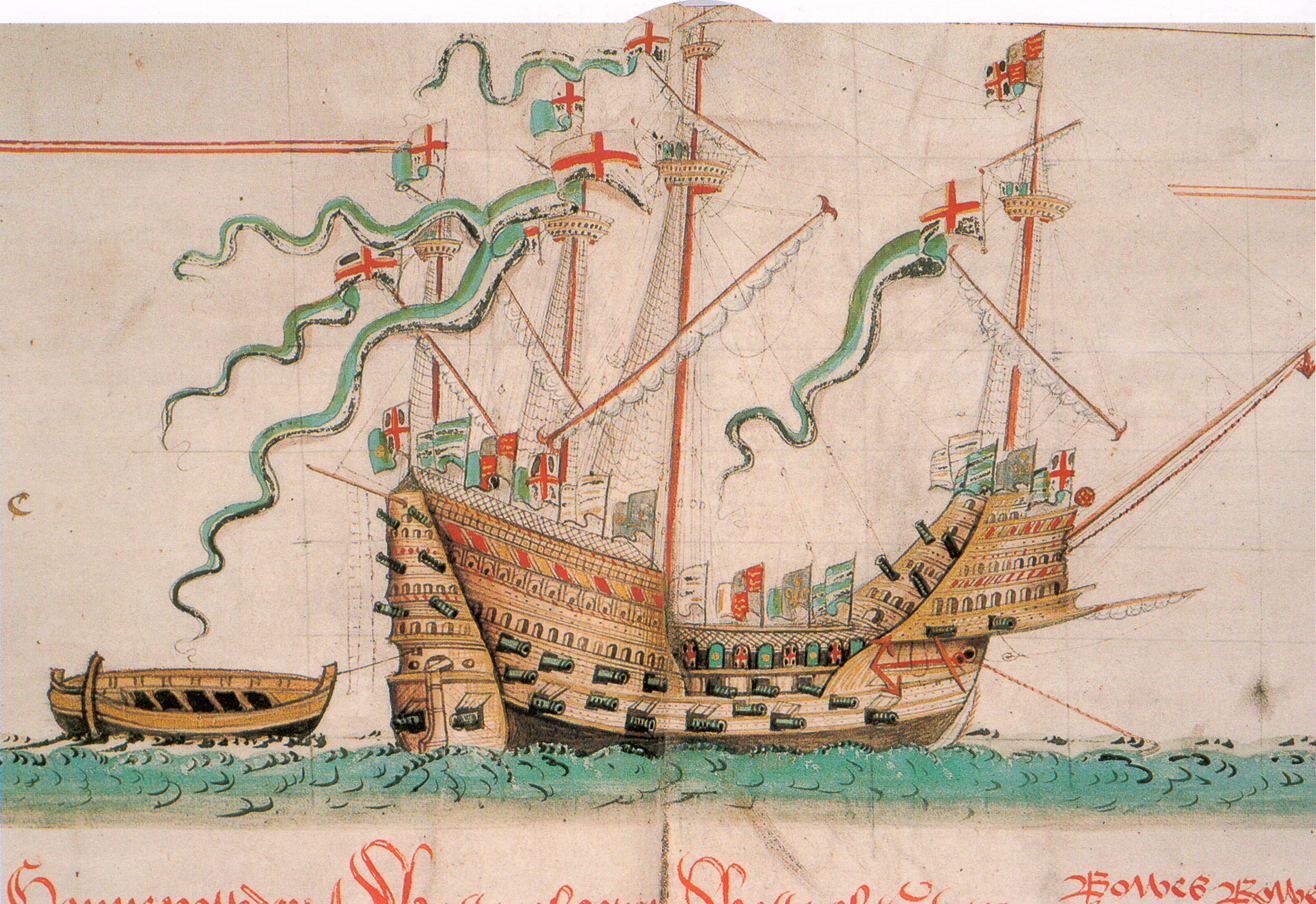
- The Mary Rose as depicted in the Anthony Roll. She has the distinct carrack profile with high "castles" fore and aft. Although the number of guns and gun ports is not exact, this is an overall accurate illustration of the ship as she appeared in the 1540s.

History

England
- Name: Mary Rose
- Namesake: Mary Tudor, Queen of France and/or the Virgin Mary
- Laid down: 29 January 1510; 516 years ago
- Launched: July 1511
- Completed: 1512
- Home port: Portsmouth, England
- Fate: Sank in battle in 1545, raised in 1982
- Status: Museum exhibit 50°48′8″N 1°6′32″W

General characteristics
- Tons burthen: 500 (700–800 after 1536)
- Propulsion: Sail
- Complement: 200 sailors, 185 soldiers, and 30 gunners
- Armament: 78–91 guns (including anti-personnel weapons)

The Mary Rose was a carrack in the English Tudor navy of King Henry VIII. She was launched in 1511 and served for 34 years in several wars against France, Scotland, and Brittany. After being substantially rebuilt in 1536, she saw her last action on 19 July 1545. She led the attack on the galleys of a French invasion fleet, but sank off Spithead in the Solent, the strait north of the Isle of Wight.

The wreck of the Mary Rose was located in 1971 and was raised on 11 October 1982 by the Mary Rose Trust in one of the most complex and expensive maritime salvage projects in history. The surviving section of the ship and thousands of recovered artefacts are of significance as a Tudor period time capsule. The excavation and raising of the Mary Rose was a milestone in the field of maritime archaeology, comparable in complexity and cost to the raising of the 17th-century Swedish warship Vasa in 1961. The Mary Rose site is designated under the Protection of Wrecks Act 1973 by statutory instrument 1974/55. The wreck is a Protected Wreck managed by Historic England.

The finds include weapons, sailing equipment, naval supplies, and a wide array of objects used by the crew. Many of the artefacts are unique to the Mary Rose and have provided insights into topics ranging from naval warfare to the history of musical instruments. The remains of the hull have been on display at the Portsmouth Historic Dockyard since the mid-1980s while undergoing restoration. An extensive collection of well-preserved artefacts is on display at the Mary Rose Museum, built to display the remains of the ship and her artefacts.

Mary Rose was one of the largest ships in the English navy through more than three decades of intermittent war, and she was one of the earliest examples of a purpose-built sailing warship. She was armed with new types of heavy guns that could fire through the recently invented gun-ports. She was substantially rebuilt in 1536 and was also one of the earliest ships that could fire a broadside, although the line of battle tactics had not yet been developed. Several theories have sought to explain the demise of the Mary Rose, based on historical records, knowledge of 16th-century shipbuilding, and modern experiments. The precise cause of her sinking is subject to conflicting testimonies and a lack of conclusive evidence.

== Historical context ==
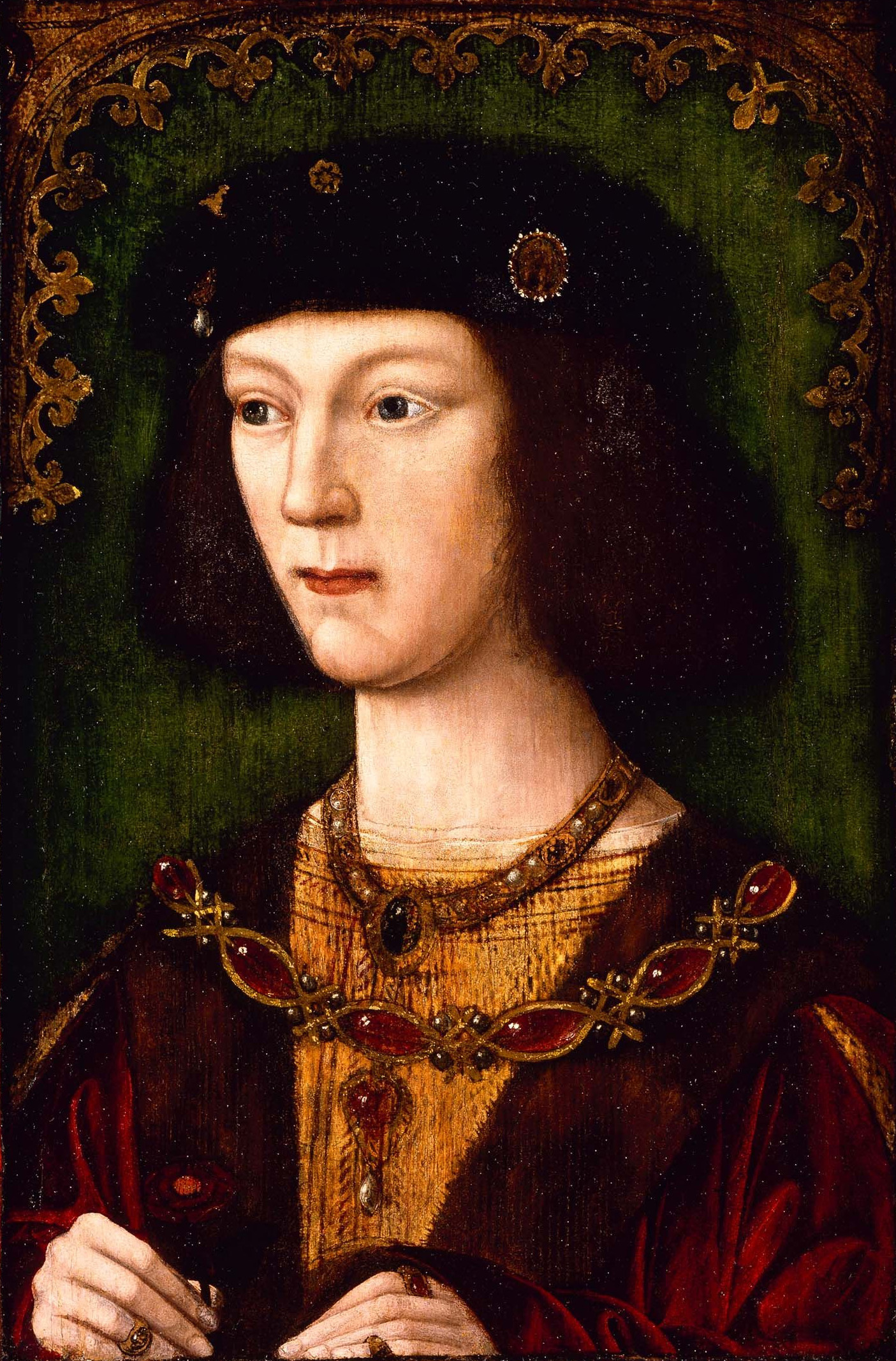
Portrait of Henry VIII in 1509, aged c.18, the year of his coronation, by Meynnart Wewyck

In the late 15th century, England was still reeling from its dynastic wars first with France and then among its ruling families back on home soil. The great victories against France in the Hundred Years' War were in the past; only the small exclave of Calais in northern France remained of the vast continental holdings of the English kings. The War of the Roses – the civil war between the houses of York and Lancaster – had ended with Henry VII's establishment of the House of Tudor, the new ruling dynasty of England. The ambitious naval policies of Henry V were not continued by his successors, and from 1422 to 1509 only six ships were built for the crown. The marriage alliance between Anne of Brittany and Charles VIII of France in 1491, and his successor Louis XII in 1499, left England with a weakened strategic position on its southern flank. Despite this, Henry VII managed to maintain a comparatively long period of peace and a small but powerful core of a navy.

At the onset of the early modern period, the great European powers were France, the Holy Roman Empire and Spain. All three became involved in the War of the League of Cambrai in 1508. The conflict was initially aimed at the Republic of Venice but eventually turned against France. England's close economic relationship with the Low Countries, ruled by the Spanish Habsburgs and any ambition of the young Henry VIII to recover territory in France made Spain the obvious ally. In 1509, six weeks into his reign, Henry married the Spanish princess Catherine of Aragon and joined the League, intent on certifying his historical claim as king of both England and France. By 1511 Henry was part of an anti-French alliance that included Ferdinand II of Aragon, Pope Julius II and Holy Roman emperor Maximilian.

The small navy that Henry VIII inherited from his father had only two sizeable ships, the carracks Regent and Sovereign. Just months after his accession, two large ships were ordered: the Mary Rose and the Peter Pomegranate (later known as Peter after being rebuilt in 1536) of about 500 and 450 tons respectively. Which king ordered the building of the Mary Rose is unclear; although construction began during Henry VIII's reign, the plans for naval expansion could have been in the making earlier. Henry VIII oversaw the project and he ordered additional large ships to be built, most notably the Henry Grace à Dieu ("Henry by the Grace of God"), or Great Harry at more than 1000 tons burthen. By the 1520s the English state had established a de facto permanent "Navy Royal", the organizational ancestor of the modern Royal Navy.

== Construction ==
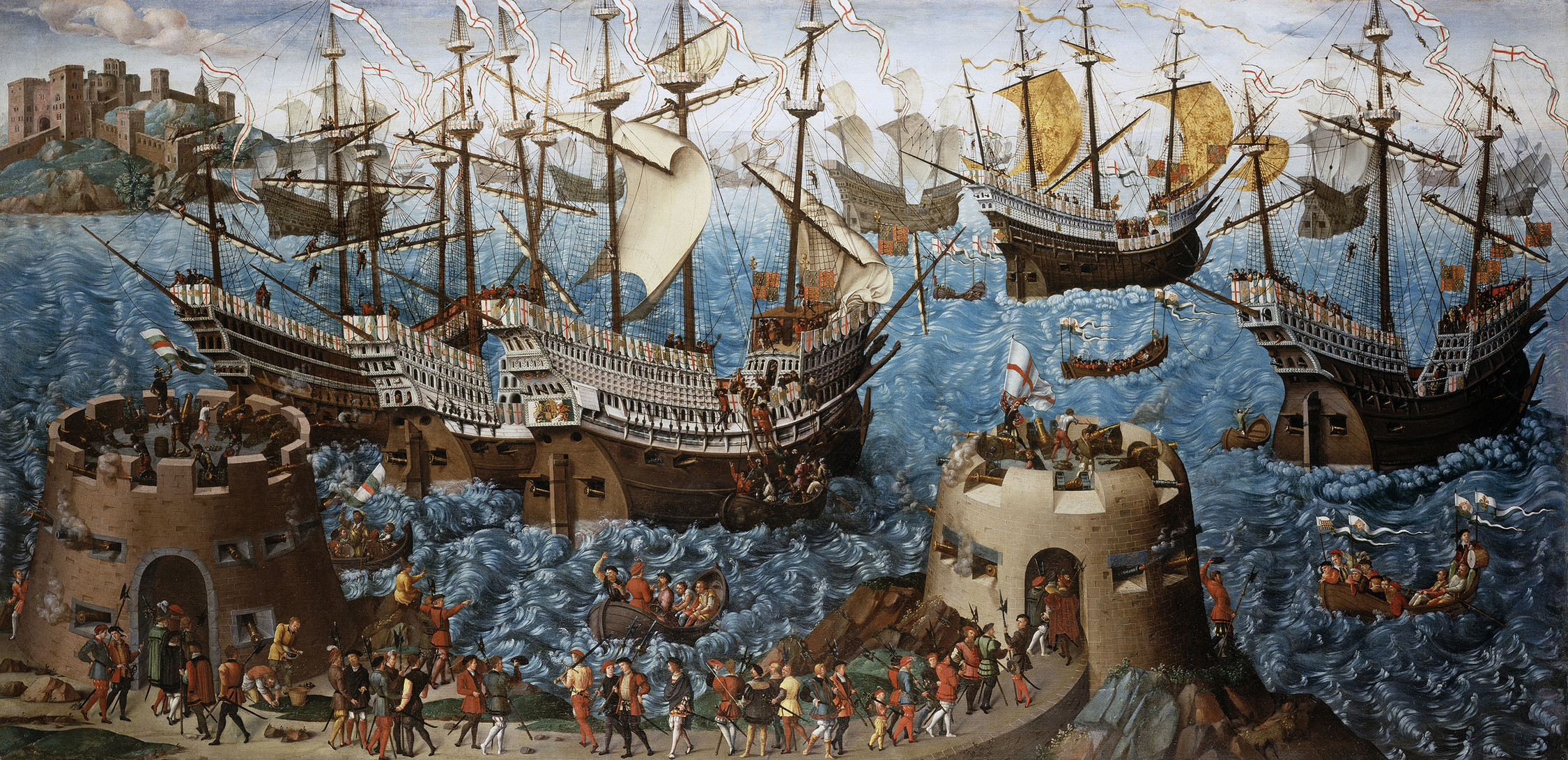
The Embarkation of Henry VIII at Dover, a painting that commemorated King Henry's voyage to the Field of the Cloth of Gold in 1520, painted in 1540. The vessels in the painting are shown decorated with wooden panels similar to those that would have been used on the Mary Rose on special occasions.

Construction of Mary Rose began on 29 January 1510 in Portsmouth and she was launched in July 1511. She was then towed to London and fitted with rigging and decking, and supplied with armaments. Other than the structural details needed to sail, stock and arm the Mary Rose, she was also equipped with flags, banners and streamers (extremely elongated flags that were flown from the top of the masts) that were either painted or gilded.

Constructing a warship of the size of the Mary Rose was a major undertaking, requiring vast quantities of high-quality material. For a state-of-the-art warship, these materials were primarily oak. The total amount of timber needed for the construction can only be roughly calculated since only about one third of the ship still exists. One estimate for the number of trees is around 600 mostly large oaks, representing about 16 hectares (40 acres) of woodland.

The huge trees that had been common in Europe and the British Isles in previous centuries were by the 16th century quite rare, which meant that timbers were brought in from all over southern England. The largest timbers used in the construction were of roughly the same size as those used in the roofs of the largest cathedrals in the High Middle Ages. An unworked hull plank would have weighed over 300 kg (660 lb), and one of the main deck beams would have weighed close to three-quarters of a tonne.

=== Naming ===
The common explanation for the ship's name was that it was inspired by Henry VIII's favourite sister, Mary Tudor, Queen of France, and the rose as the emblem of the Tudors. According to the historians David Childs, David Loades and Peter Marsden, no direct evidence of naming the ship after the King's sister exists. It was far more common at the time to give ships pious Christian names, a long-standing tradition in Western Europe, or to associate them with their royal patrons. Names like Grace Dieu (Hallelujah) and Holighost (Holy Spirit) had been common since the 15th century and other Tudor navy ships had names like the Regent and Three Ostrich Feathers (referring to the crest of the Prince of Wales). The Virgin Mary is a more likely candidate for a namesake, and she was also associated with the Rosa Mystica (mystic rose). The name of the sister ship of the Mary Rose, the Peter Pomegranate, is believed to have been named in honour of Saint Peter, and the badge of the Queen Catharine of Aragon, a pomegranate. According to Childs, Loades and Marsden, the two ships, which were built around the same time, were named in honour of the king and queen, respectively.

== Design ==
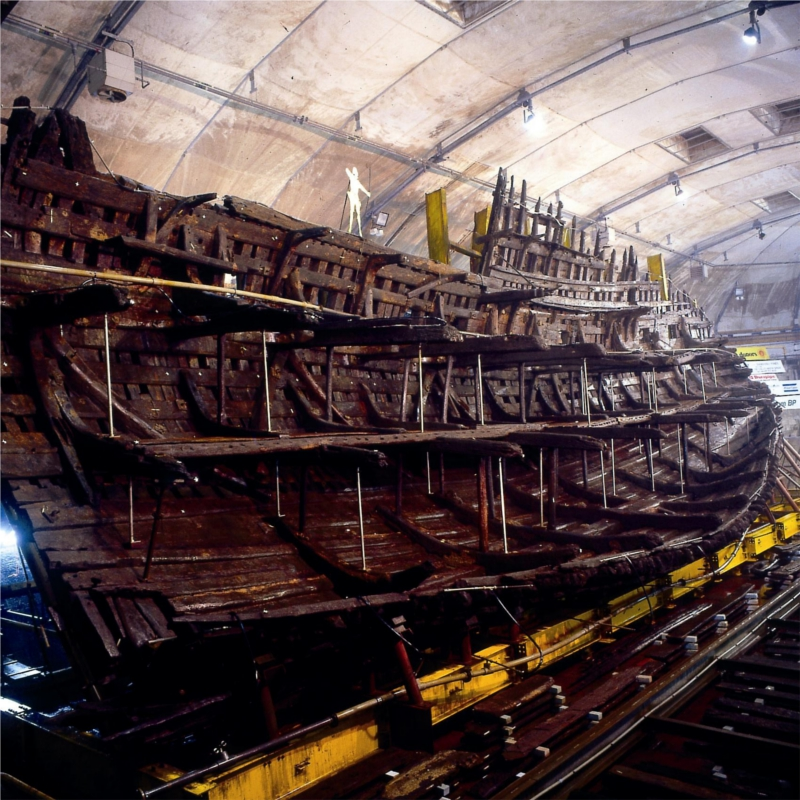
The remains of the Mary Rose's hull. All deck levels can be made out clearly, including the minor remnants of the sterncastle deck.

The Mary Rose was substantially rebuilt in 1536. The 1536 rebuilding turned a ship of 500 tons into one of 700 tons, and added an entire extra tier of broadside guns to the old carrack-style structure. By consequence, modern research is based mostly on interpretations of the concrete physical evidence of this version of the Mary Rose. The construction of the original design from 1509 is less known.

The Mary Rose was built according to the carrack-style with high "castles" fore and aft with a low waist of open decking in the middle. The hull has tumblehome: above the waterline, the hull gradually narrows. This makes boarding more difficult and reduces the quantity (and so weight) of heavy structural timbers that carry the higher guns. Modern understanding is that tumblehome does not improve stability by positioning the guns closer to the centreline, though that may have been the belief and intention of her builders.

Since only part of the hull has survived, it is not possible to determine many of the basic dimensions with any great accuracy. The moulded breadth, the widest point of the ship roughly above the waterline, was about 12 metres (39 feet) and the keel about 32 metres (105 feet), although the ship's overall length is uncertain.

The hull had four levels separated by three decks. Because the terminology for these was not yet standardised in the 16th century, the terms used here are those that were applied by the Mary Rose Trust. The hold lay furthest down in the ship, right above the bottom planking and below the waterline. This is where the galley was situated and the food was cooked. Directly aft of the galley was the mast step, a rebate in the centre-most timber of the keelson, right above the keel, which supported the main mast, and next to it the main bilge pump. To increase the stability of the ship, the hold was where the ballast was placed and much of the supplies were kept. Right above the hold was the orlop, the lowest deck. Like the hold, it was partitioned and was also used as a storage area for everything from food to spare sails.

Above the orlop lay the main deck, which housed the heaviest guns. The side of the hull on the main deck level had seven gunports on each side fitted with heavy lids that would have been watertight when closed. This was also the highest deck that was caulked and waterproof. Along the sides of the main deck there were cabins under the forecastle and aftercastle which have been identified as belonging to the carpenter, barber-surgeon, pilot and possibly also the master gunner and some of the officers.

The top deck in the hull structure was the upper deck (or weather deck) which was exposed to the elements in the waist. It was a dedicated fighting deck without any known partitions and a mix of heavy and light guns. Over the open waist, the upper deck was entirely covered with a boarding net, a coarse netting that served as a defence measure against boarding. Though very little of the upper deck has survived, it has been suggested that it housed the main living quarters of the crew underneath the aftercastle. A drain located in this area has been identified as a possible "piss-dale", a general urinal to complement the regular toilets which would probably have been located in the bow.

The castles of the Mary Rose had additional decks, but since almost nothing of them survives, their design has had to be reconstructed from historical records. Contemporary ships of equal size were consistently listed as having three decks in both castles. Although speculative, this layout is supported by the illustration in the Anthony Roll and the gun inventories.

During the early stages of excavation of the wreck, it was erroneously believed that the ship had originally been built with clinker (or clench) planking, a technique in which the hull consisted of overlapping planks that bore the structural strength of the ship. Later examination indicates that the clinker planking was never present throughout the ship; only the outer structure of the sterncastle is built with overlapping planking, though not with a true clinker technique.

=== Construction method ===
The hull of Mary Rose is carvel built. The ship is an early example of this method of construction in England. Her hull shape is now known to have been set out using the three arc method of producing the hull cross section. This geometric process is similar to that known to have been used some two hundred years later, so giving a much earlier date for this technique. This, and studies of other ships specified in the 15th century, is suggestive that the three arc methodology was probably already in existence before the time Mary Rose was built.

The construction sequence began with laying the keel and setting up the stem and sternpost. The midships frame and a few other frames (master frames) controlled the shape of the hull, so the floors in those positions were fastened to the top of the keel. Then planking started with the garboards being fastened to the keel and those floors that were already installed. A temporary timber batten (called a ribband) was fastened across the floors that had been fitted and the remaining floors were shaped to fit the curve delineated by the ribbands and the garboards. The keelson was fastened over the top of the floors and planking continued up from the garboards to near the end of the floors. The first futtocks were then installed, again using ribbands to achieve a fair shape relative to the master frames. The hull construction continued with phases of planking and the fitting of second and third futtocks until deck level was reached.

Mary Rose does not have the characteristic dove-tailed mortises seen joining the floors and first futtocks in Basque-built ships such as the Red Bay wreck 24M. There is some fastening of floors to timbers in Mary Rose that is less systematic and robust, but there are no treenails connecting frame elements to each other as seen on later vessels. This demonstrates that the hull was not made by first building the hull framework and then adding the planking once that was complete. Instead planking and framing were carried out in alternating steps, with later futtocks being added as planking carried on up to the weather deck level. This is in sharp contrast to the usual way of building a carvel hull today.

The construction sequence used for Mary Rose was typical for a ship built during the lengthy transition period during which carvel became established in Northern Europe and the precise detail is one of the milestones in that story.

=== Sails and rigging ===
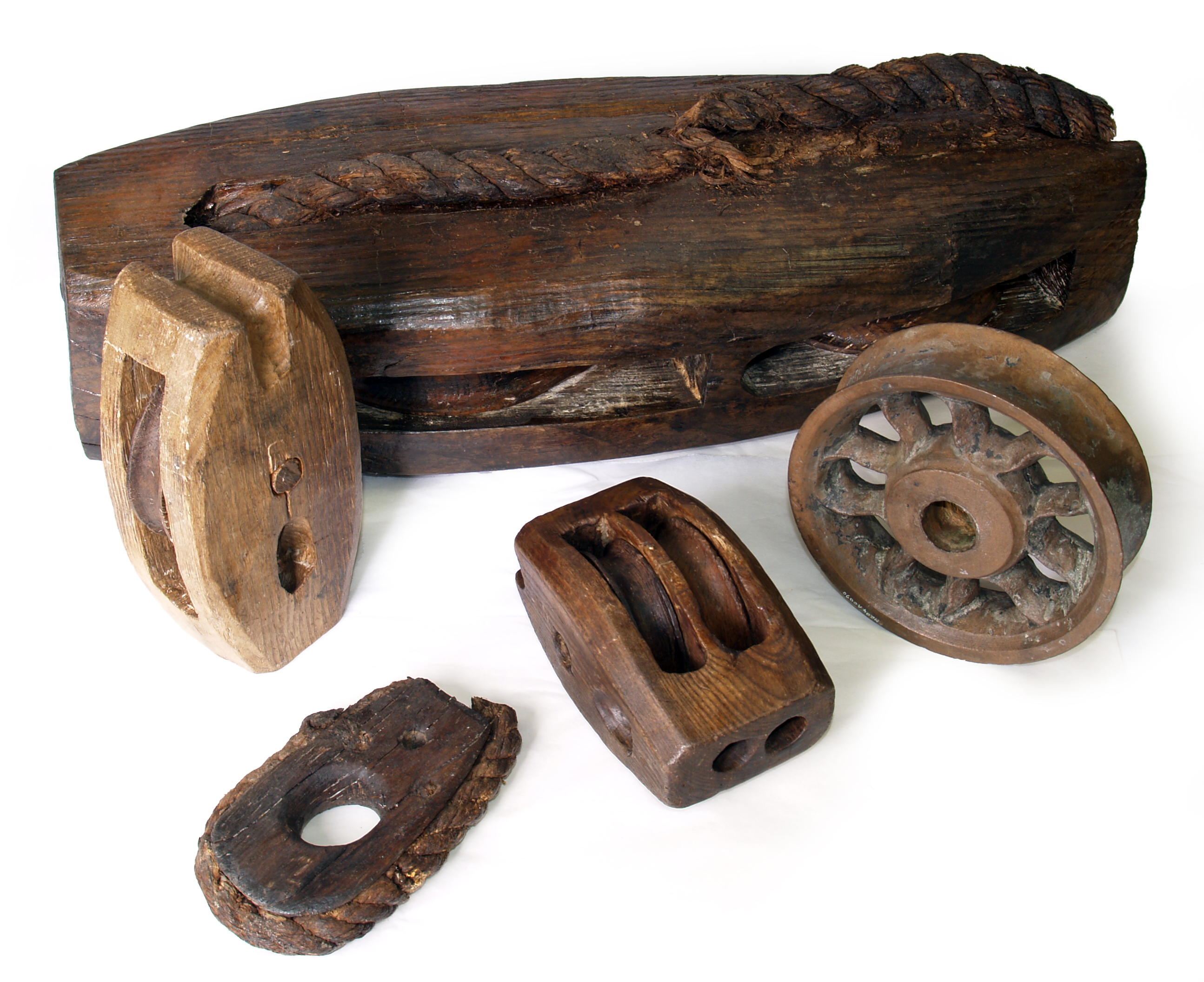
A small selection of the many rigging blocks raised from the Mary Rose

Although only the lower fittings of the rigging survive, a 1514 inventory and the only known contemporary depiction of the ship from the Anthony Roll have been used to determine how the Mary Rose was rigged. Nine, or possibly ten, sails were set from four masts and a bowsprit: the foremast had two square sails and the mainmast three; the mizzen mast had a lateen sail and a small square sail; the bonaventure mizzen had at least one lateen sail and possibly also a square sail; and the bowsprit set a small square spritsail. According to the Anthony Roll illustration (see top of this section), the yards (the spars from which the sails were set) on the foremast and mainmast were also equipped with sheerhooks – twin curved blades sharpened on the inside – that were intended to cut an enemy ship's rigging during boarding actions.

The operation of Mary Rose's rig and some of its fitments were substantially different from several phases of later versions of square rig. All the yards were hoisted and lowered as part of the normal processes of setting, handing or reducing sail. The furling of the square sails pulled much of the bulk of the sail into the centre of the yard, so the work aloft did not involve a lot of work on the yards (the foot-rope did not come into use until the early 18th century), with much being done from the tops. Ships of this era generally did not have reefing points (though they existed on boats' sails). Instead a square sail might be equipped with a bonnet – an extra section of sail that is laced onto the foot of a square sail. Instead of reefing, the bonnet was removed. Lacing that would suit a bonnet was found on Mary Rose.

=== Performance ===
When the wreck of Mary Rose was first recovered, there was surprise that this was not the beamy vessel that was expected. The relatively narrow length to breadth ratio was accompanied by fine lines, particularly in the run (the underwater hull shape abaft the midship section). Even in the full sections in the forward part of the hull there are some hollow lines. Generally, hull shape is a major contributor, in conjunction with the efficiency of the sails, to good sailing performance. This hull shape can certainly explain the reported good sailing qualities that Mary Rose displayed prior to her rebuild.

The sailing capabilities of the Mary Rose were commented on by her contemporaries and were once even put to the test. In March 1513 a contest was arranged off The Downs, east of Kent, in which she raced against nine other ships. She won the contest, and Admiral Edward Howard described her enthusiastically as "the noblest ship of sayle [of any] gret ship, at this howr, that I trow [believe] be in Cristendom". Several years later, while sailing between Dover and The Downs, Vice-Admiral William Fitzwilliam noted that both the Henry Grace à Dieu and the Mary Rose performed very well, riding steadily in rough seas and that it would have been a "hard chose" between the two. The reports of good sailing performance early in her career did not continue after successive repairs and the major rebuild altered her characteristics.

=== Armament ===
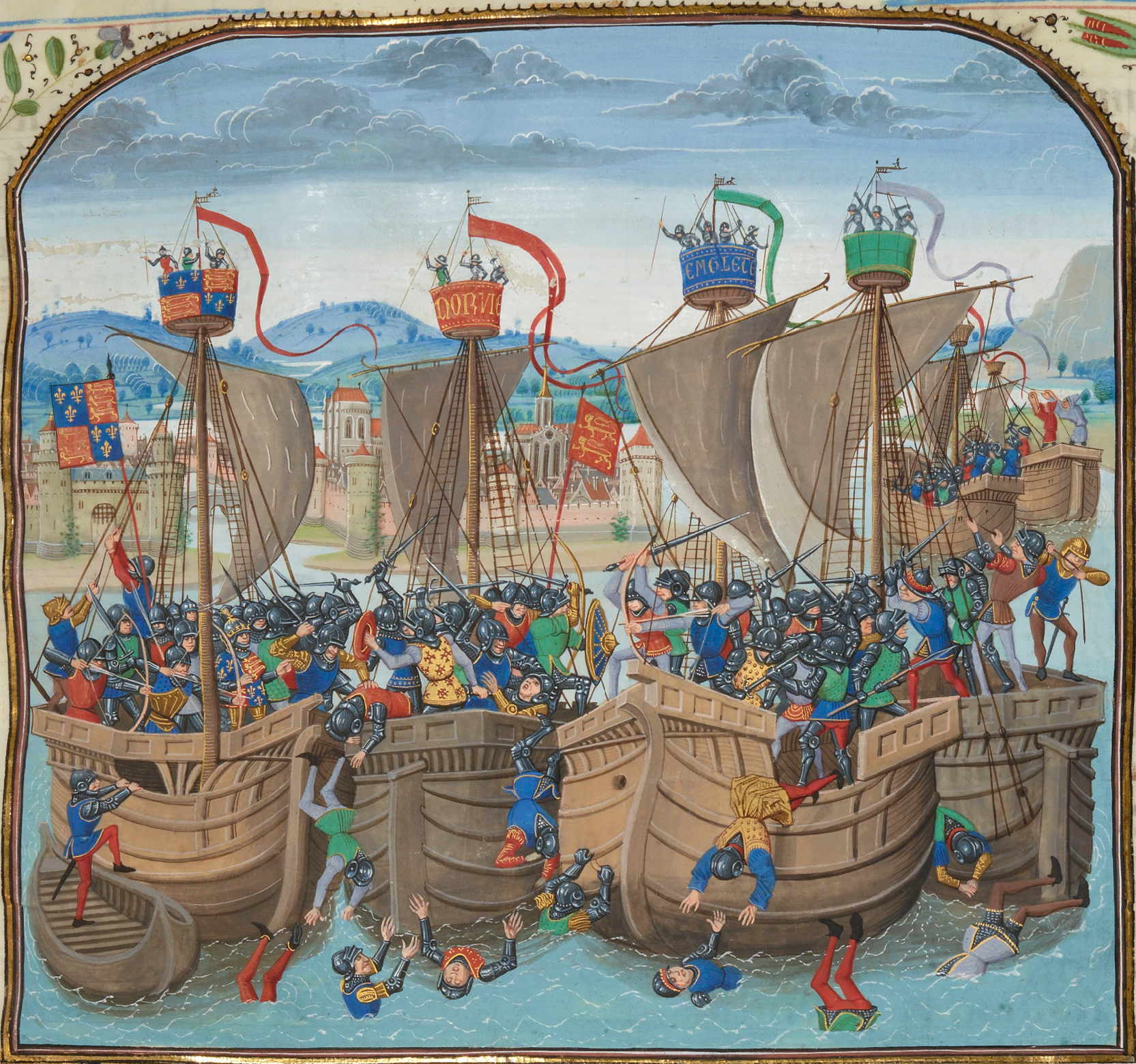
An illustration from a French edition of the Froissart Chronicle depicting the Battle of Sluys in 1340. The picture clearly shows how medieval naval tactics focused on close combat fighting and boarding.

The Mary Rose represented a transitional ship design in naval warfare. Since ancient times, war at sea had been fought much as on land: with melee weapons and bows and arrows, only on floating wooden platforms rather than battlefields. Though the introduction of guns was a significant change, it only slowly changed the dynamics of ship-to-ship combat. As guns became heavier and able to take more powerful gunpowder charges, they needed to be placed lower in the ship, closer to the water line. Gunports cut in the hull of ships had been introduced as early as 1501, only about a decade before the Mary Rose was built.

This made broadsides (Note: It was not until the 1590s that the word "broadside" in English was commonly used to refer to gunfire from the side of a ship rather than the ship's side itself; Rodger (1996), pp. 312, 316) – coordinated volleys from all the guns on one side of a ship – possible, at least in theory, but in practice this was a relatively minor part of the gunnery tactics of the time. Throughout the 16th century and well into the 17th century the focus was on countering the oar-powered galleys that were armed with heavy guns in the bow, facing forwards, which were aimed by turning the entire ship against its target. Sailing warships did this first with their chase guns. Combined with inefficient gunpowder and the difficulties inherent in firing accurately from moving platforms, this meant that boarding remained the primary tactic for decisive victory throughout the 16th century.

==== Bronze and iron guns ====
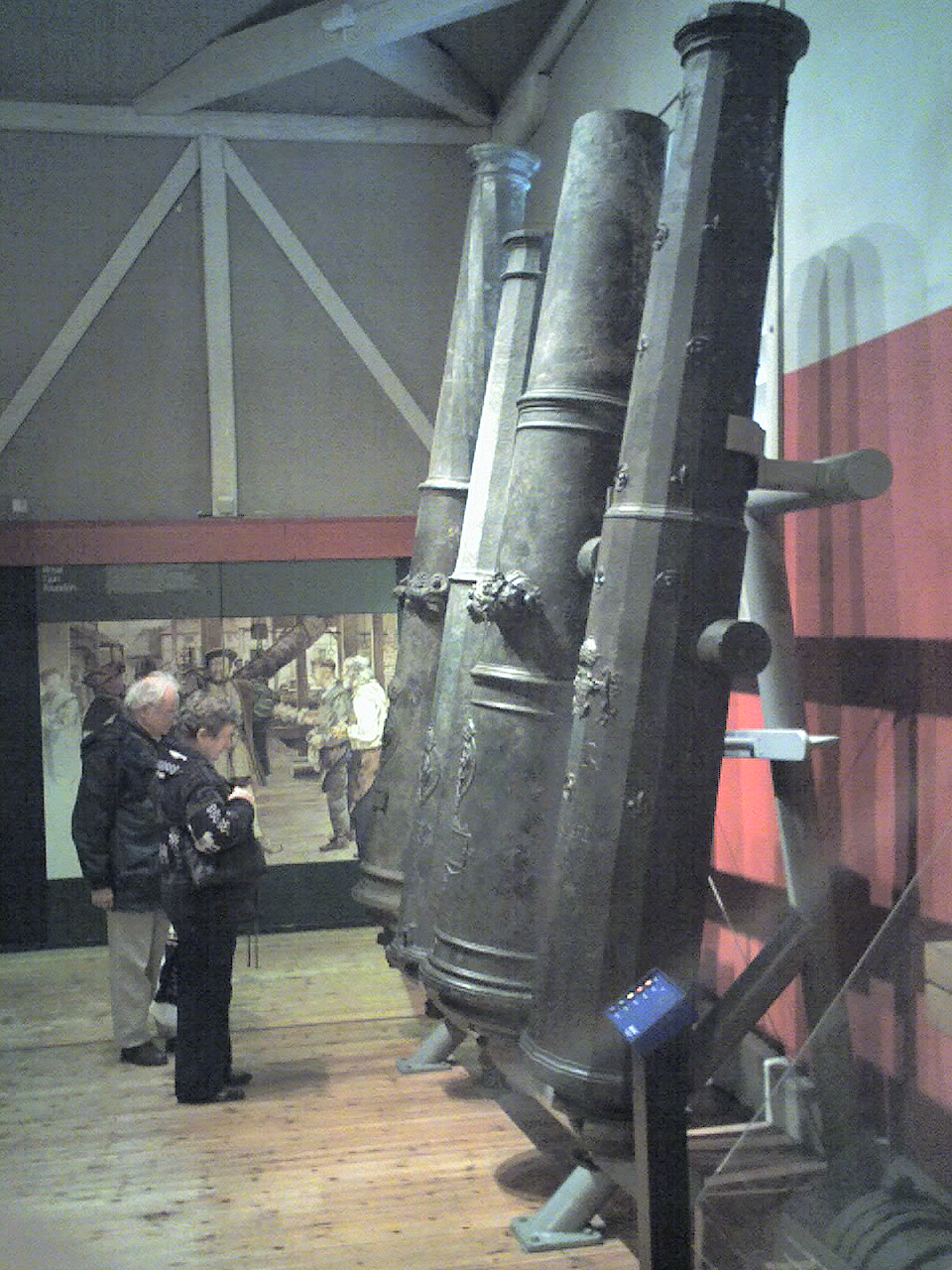
Two culverins and two demi-cannons from the Mary Rose on display at the Mary Rose Museum in Portsmouth

Mary Rose served during a period of both the development of ship-borne guns and the design features of ships that deployed these weapons. By the time of her sinking, the number of heavy guns had roughly doubled. The heavy armament was a mix of older-type wrought iron and more modern cast bronze guns, which differed considerably in size, range and design. The large iron guns were made up of staves or bars welded into cylinders and then reinforced by shrinking iron hoops and breech loaded and equipped with simpler gun-carriages made from hollowed-out elm logs with only one pair of wheels, or without wheels entirely.

The bronze guns were cast in one piece and rested on four-wheel carriages which were essentially the same as those used until the 19th century. The breech-loaders were cheaper to produce and both easier and faster to reload, but could take less powerful charges than cast bronze guns. Generally, the bronze guns used cast iron shot and were more suited to penetrate hull sides while the iron guns used stone shot that would shatter on impact and leave large, jagged holes, but both could also fire a variety of ammunition intended to destroy rigging and light structure or injure enemy personnel.

The majority of the guns were small iron guns with short range that could be aimed and fired by a single person. The two most common are the bases, breech-loading swivel guns, most likely placed in the castles, and hailshot pieces, small muzzle-loaders with rectangular bores and fin-like protrusions that were used to support the guns against the railing and allow the ship structure to take the force of the recoil. Though the design is unknown, there were two top pieces in a 1546 inventory (finished after the sinking) which were probably similar to a base, but placed in one or more of the fighting tops.

Distribution and range of guns at sinking
Gun type	Main deck	Upper deck	Castle decks	Fighting tops	Range in metres (feet)
Port pieces	12	0	0	0	130+ (425+)
Culverins and demi-culverins	2	4	2	0	299–413 (980–1355)
Cannons and demi-cannons	4	0	0	0	c. 225 (740)
Sakers	0	2	0	0	219–323 (718–1060)
Fowlers	0	6	0	0	"short"
Falcon	?	?	?	0	144–287 (472–940)
Slings	0	6	0	0	"medium"
Bases	0	0	30	0	"close"
Hailshot pieces	0	0	20	0	"close"
Top pieces	0	0	0	2	"close"

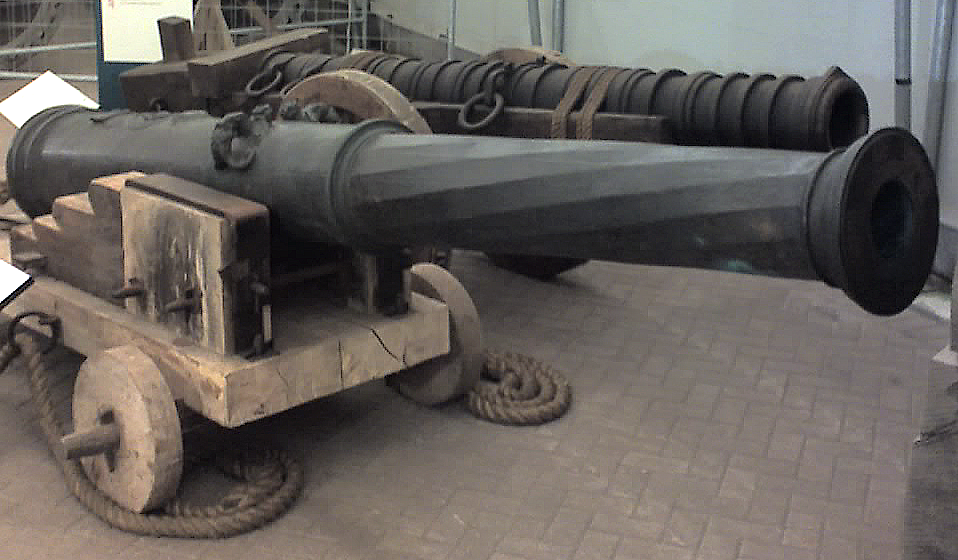
A cast bronze culverin (front) and a wrought iron port piece (back), modern reproductions of two of the guns that were on board the Mary Rose when she sank, on display at Fort Nelson near Portsmouth

The ship went through several changes in her armament throughout her career, most significantly accompanying her "rebuilding" in 1536 (see below), when the number of anti-personnel guns was reduced and a second tier of carriage-mounted long guns fitted. There are three inventories that list her guns, dating to 1514, 1540 and 1546. Together with records from the armoury at the Tower of London, these show how the configuration of guns changed as gun-making technology evolved and new classifications were invented. In 1514, the armament consisted mostly of anti-personnel guns like the larger breech-loading iron murderers and the small serpentines, demi-slings and stone guns.

Only a handful of guns in the first inventory were powerful enough to hole enemy ships, and most would have been supported by the ship's structure rather than resting on carriages. The inventories of both the Mary Rose and the Tower had changed radically by 1540. There were now the new cast bronze cannons, demi-cannons, culverins and sakers and the wrought iron port pieces (a name that indicated they fired through ports), all of which required carriages, had longer range and were capable of doing serious damage to other ships. The analysis of the 1514 inventory combined with hints of structural changes in the ship both indicate that the gunports on the main deck were indeed a later addition.

Type of guns
Date	Total	Carriage-mounted	Ship-supported	Anti-ship	Anti-personnel
1514	78	20–21	57–58	5–9	64–73
1540	96	36	60	17–22	74–79
1545	91	39	52	24	67

Various types of ammunition could be used for different purposes: plain spherical shot of stone or iron smashed hulls, spiked bar shot and shot linked with chains would tear sails or damage rigging, and canister shot packed with sharp flints produced a devastating shotgun effect. Trials made with replicas of culverins and port pieces showed that they could penetrate wood the same thickness of the Mary Rose's hull planking, indicating a stand-off range of at least 90 m (300 ft). The port pieces proved particularly efficient at smashing large holes in wood when firing stone shot and were a devastating anti-personnel weapon when loaded with flakes or pebbles.

==== Hand-held weapons ====
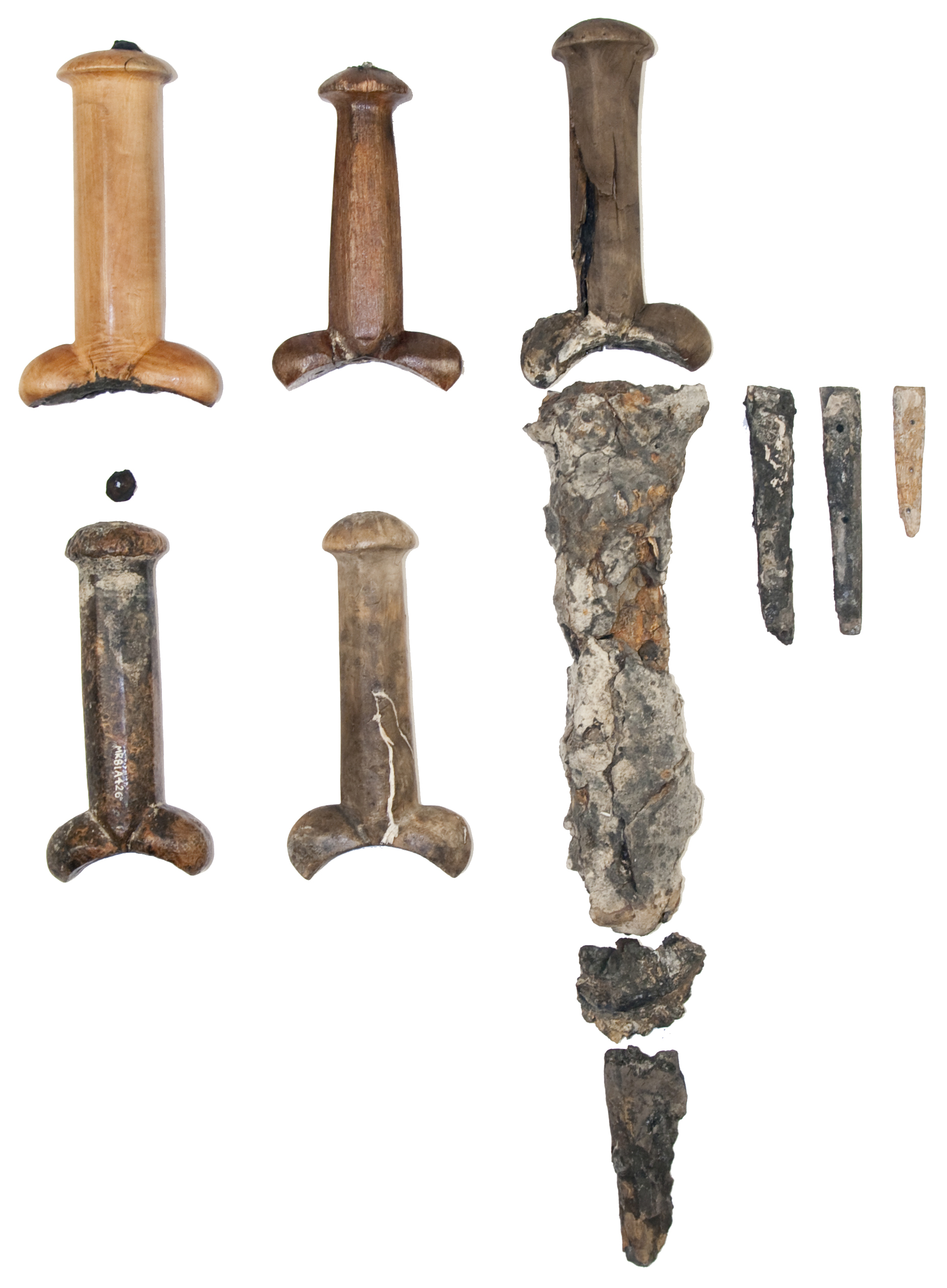
Some of the bollock daggers found on board the Mary Rose; for most of the daggers, only the handles have remained while the blades have either rusted away or have been preserved only as concretions.

To defend against being boarded, Mary Rose carried large stocks of melee weapons, including pikes and bills; 150 of each kind were stocked on the ship according to the Anthony Roll, a figure confirmed roughly by the excavations. Swords and daggers were personal possessions and not listed in the inventories, but the remains of both have been found in great quantities, including the earliest dated example of a British basket-hilted sword.

A total of 250 longbows were carried on board, and 172 of these have so far been found, as well as almost 4,000 arrows, bracers (arm guards) and other archery-related equipment. Longbow archery in Tudor England was mandatory for all able adult men, and despite the introduction of field artillery and handguns, they were used alongside new missile weapons in great quantities. On the Mary Rose, the longbows could only have been drawn and shot properly from behind protective panels in the open waist or from the top of the castles as the lower decks lacked sufficient headroom. There were several types of bows of various size and range. Lighter bows would have been used as "sniper" bows, while the heavier design could possibly have been used to shoot fire arrows.

The inventories of both 1514 and 1546 also list several hundred heavy darts and lime pots that were designed to be thrown onto the deck of enemy ships from the fighting tops, although no physical evidence of either of these weapon types has been identified. Of the 50 handguns listed in the Anthony Roll, the complete stocks of five matchlock muskets and fragments of another eleven have been found. They had been manufactured mainly in Italy, with some originating from Germany. Found in storage were several gunshields, a rare type of firearm consisting of a wooden shield with a small gun fixed in the middle.

=== Crew ===
Throughout her 33-year career, the crew of the Mary Rose changed several times and varied considerably in size. It would have a minimal skeleton crew of 17 men or fewer in peacetime and when she was "laid up in ordinary" (in reserve). The average wartime manning would have been about 185 soldiers, 200 sailors, 20–30 gunners and an assortment of other specialists such as surgeons, trumpeters and members of the admiral's staff, for a total of 400–450 men. When taking part in land invasions or raids, such as in the summer of 1512, the number of soldiers could have swelled to just over 400 for a combined total of more than 700. Even with the normal crew size of around 400, the ship was quite crowded, and with additional soldiers would have been extremely cramped.

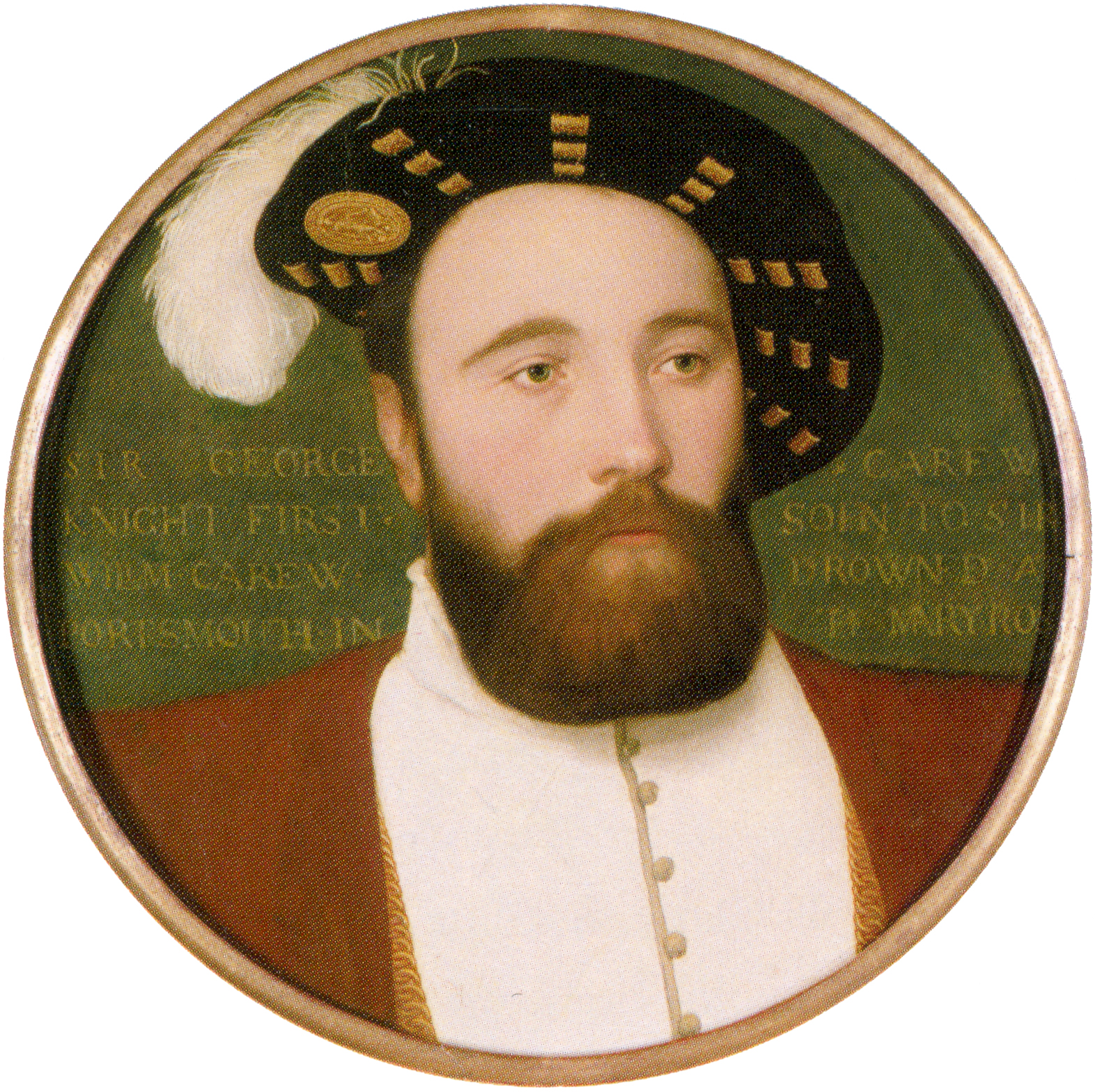
Vice-Admiral George Carew, who perished with the Mary Rose; contemporary miniature by Hans Holbein the Younger

Little is known of the identities of the men who served on the Mary Rose, even when it comes to the names of the officers, who would have belonged to the gentry. Two admirals and four captains (including Edward and Thomas Howard, who served both positions) are known through records, as well as a few ship masters, pursers, master gunners and other specialists. Forensic science has been used by artists to create reconstructions of faces of eight crew members, and the results were publicised in May 2013. In addition, researchers have extracted DNA from remains in the hopes of identifying origins of crew, and potentially living descendants.

Of the vast majority of the crewmen, soldiers, sailors and gunners alike, nothing has been recorded. The only source of information for these men has been through osteological analysis of the human bones found at the wrecksite. An approximate composition of some of the crew has been conjectured based on contemporary records. The Mary Rose would have carried a captain, a master responsible for navigation, and deck crew. There would also have been a purser responsible for handling payments, a boatswain, the captain's second in command, at least one carpenter, a pilot in charge of navigation, and a cook, all of whom had one or more assistants (mates). The ship was also staffed by a barber-surgeon who tended to the sick and wounded, along with an apprentice or mate and possibly also a junior surgeon. The only positively identified person who went down with the ship was Vice-Admiral George Carew. McKee, Stirland and several other authors have also named Roger Grenville, father of Richard Grenville of the Elizabethan-era Revenge, captain during the final battle, although the accuracy of the sourcing for this has been disputed by maritime archaeologist Peter Marsden.

Crew
Date	Soldiers	Mariners	Gunners	Others	Total
Summer 1512	411	206	120	22	759
October 1512	?	120	20	20	?
1513	?	200	?	?	?
1513	?	102	6	?	?
1522	126	244	30	2	402
1524	185	200	20	?	?
1545/46	185	200	30	?	?

The bones of a total of 179 people were found during the excavations of the Mary Rose, including 92 "fairly complete skeletons", (Note: In 2021, it was determined that the number of "fairly complete skeletons" present may be as high as 98.) more or less complete collections of bones associated with specific individuals. Analysis of these has shown that crew members were all male, most of them young adults. Some were no more than 11–13 years old, and the majority (81%) under 30. They were mainly of English origin and, according to archaeologist Julie Gardiner, they most likely came from the West Country; many following their aristocratic masters into maritime service. There were also a few people from continental Europe. An eyewitness testimony right after the sinking refers to a survivor who was a Fleming, and the pilot may very well have been French. Analysis of oxygen isotopes in teeth indicates that some were also of southern European origin. At least one crewmember was of North African ancestry. In general they were strong, well-fed men, but many of the bones also reveal tell-tale signs of childhood diseases and a life of grinding toil. The bones also showed traces of numerous healed fractures, probably the result of on-board accidents.

There are no extant written records of the make-up of the broader categories of soldiers and sailors, but since the Mary Rose carried some 300 longbows and several thousand arrows there had to be a considerable proportion of longbow archers. Examination of the skeletal remains has found that there was a disproportionate number of men with a condition known as os acromiale, affecting their shoulder blades. This condition is known among modern elite archery athletes and is caused by placing considerable stress on the arm and shoulder muscles, particularly of the left arm that is used to hold the bow to brace against the pull on the bowstring. Among the men who died on the ship it was likely that some had practised using the longbow since childhood, and served on board as specialist archers.

A group of six skeletons was found close to one of the 2-tonne bronze culverins on the main deck near the bow. Fusing of parts of the spine and ossification, the growth of new bone, on several vertebrae evidenced all but one of these crewmen to have been strong, well-muscled men who had been engaged in heavy pulling and pushing, the exception possibly being a "powder monkey" not involved in heavy work. These have been tentatively classified as members of a complete gun crew, all having died at their battle station.

== Military career ==
=== First French war ===
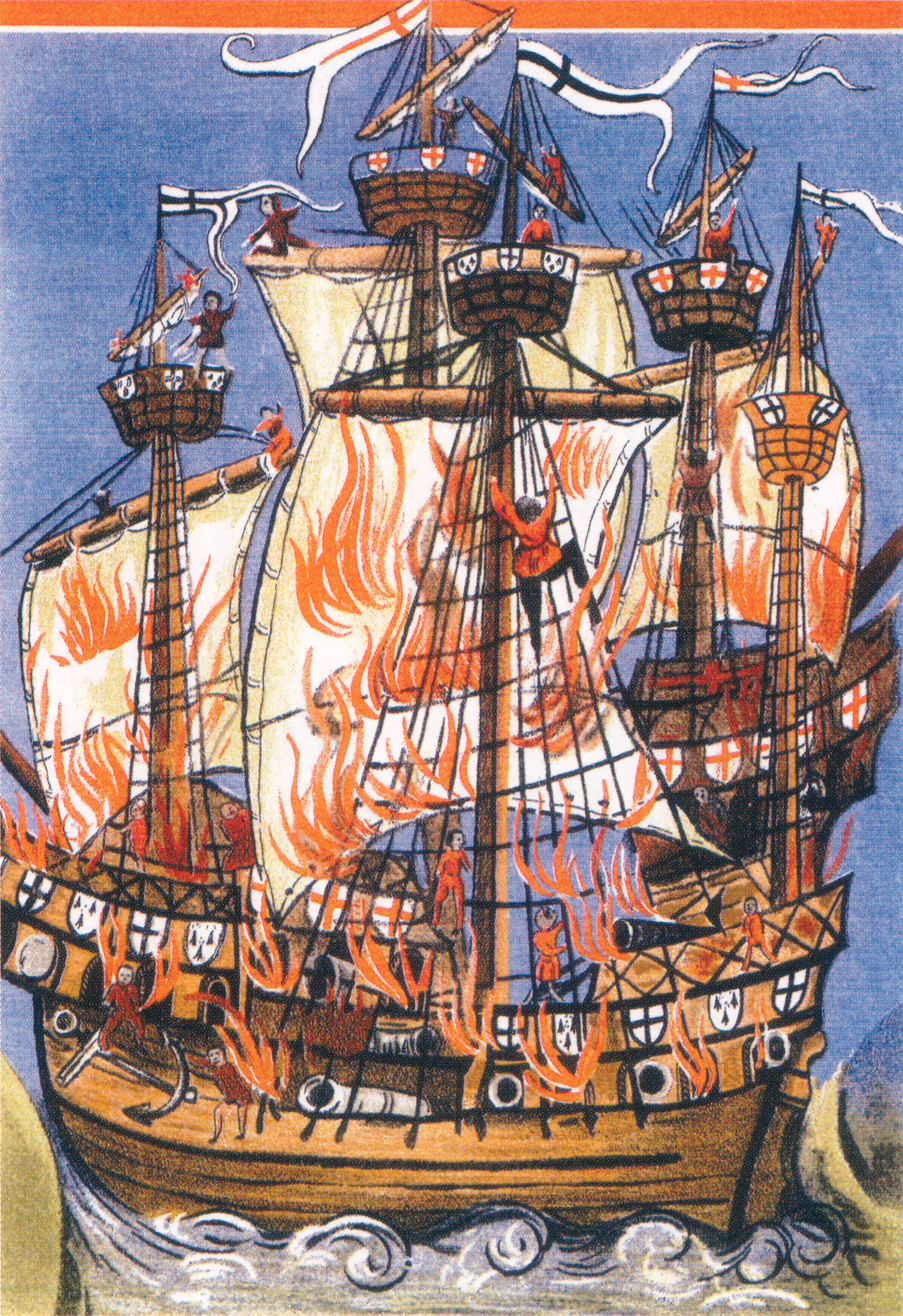
A contemporary illustration of Germain de Brie's poem Chordigerae navis conflagratio depicting the Cordelière and Regent ablaze after the explosion on board the former

The Mary Rose first saw battle in 1512, in a joint naval operation with the Spanish against the French. The English were to meet the French and Breton fleets in the English Channel while the Spanish attacked them in the Bay of Biscay and then attacked Gascony. The 35-year-old Sir Edward Howard was appointed Lord High Admiral in April and chose the Mary Rose as his flagship. His first mission was to clear the seas of French naval forces between England to the northern coast of Spain to allow for the landing of supporting troops near the French border at Fuenterrabia. The fleet consisted of 18 ships, among them the large ships the Regent and the Peter Pomegranate, carrying over 5,000 men. Howard's expedition led to the capture of twelve Breton ships and a four-day raiding tour of Brittany where English forces successfully fought against local forces and burned numerous settlements.

The fleet returned to Southampton in June where it was visited by King Henry. In August the fleet sailed for Brest where it encountered a joint, but ill-coordinated, French-Breton fleet at the battle of St. Mathieu. The English with one of the great ships in the lead (according to Marsden the Mary Rose) battered the French ships with heavy gunfire and forced them to retreat. The Breton flagship Cordelière put up a fight and was boarded by the 1,000-ton Regent. By accident or through the unwillingness of the Breton crew to surrender, the powder magazine of the Cordelière caught fire and blew up in a violent explosion, setting fire to the Regent and eventually sinking her. About 180 English crew members saved themselves by throwing themselves into the sea; a handful of Bretons survived, only to be captured. The captain of the Regent, 600 soldiers and sailors, the High Admiral of France and the steward of the town of Morlaix were killed in the incident, making it the focal point of several contemporary chronicles and reports. On 11 August, the English burnt 27 French ships, captured another five and landed forces near Brest to raid and take prisoners, but storms forced the fleet back to Dartmouth in Devon and then to Southampton for repairs.

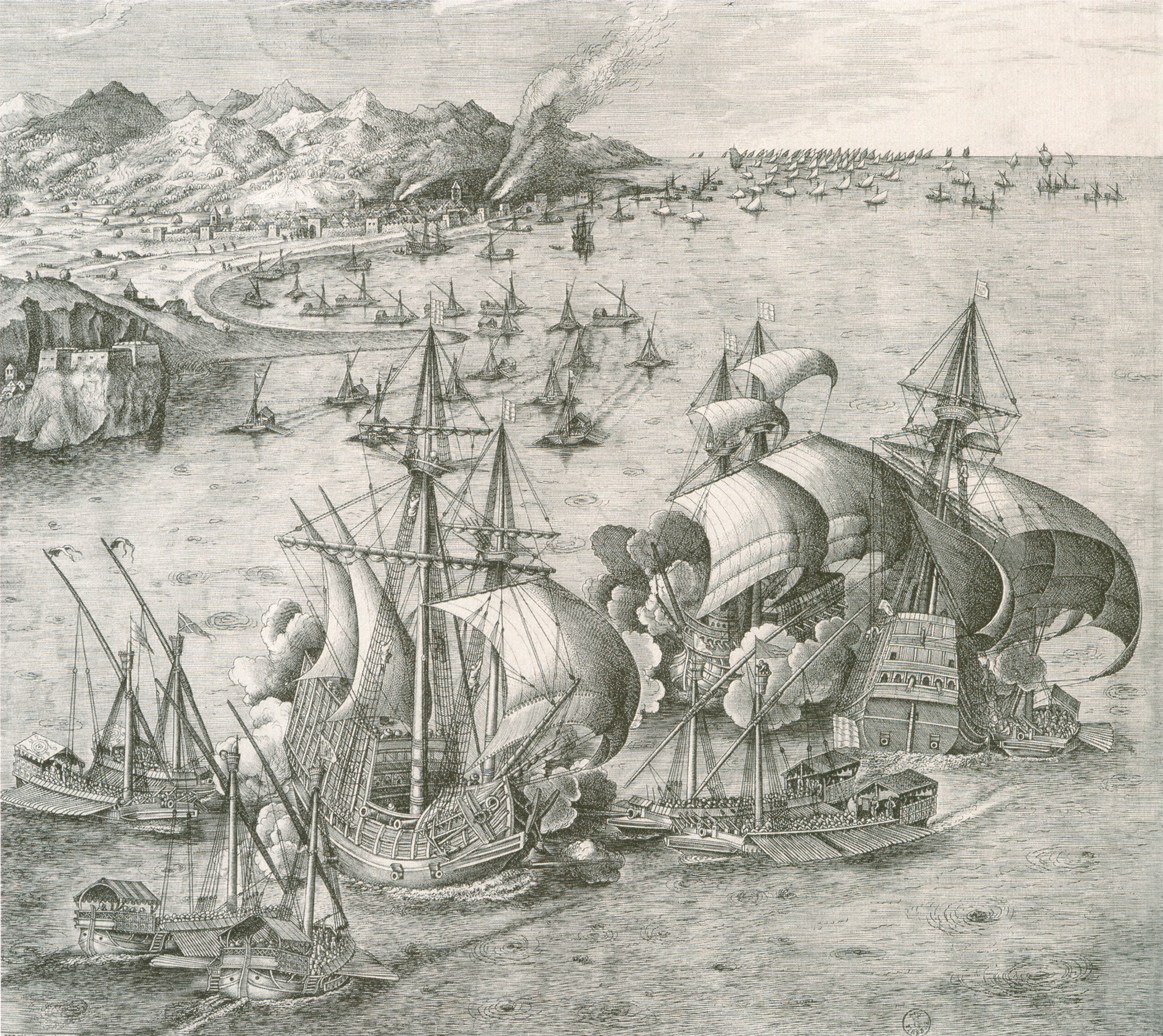
Carracks, similar to the Mary Rose, attacked by highly manoeuvrable galleys; engraving by Frans Huys after a design by Pieter Bruegel the Elder, c. 1561

In early 1513, the Mary Rose was once more chosen by Howard as the flagship for an expedition against the French. Before seeing action, she took part in a race against other ships where she was deemed to be one of the most nimble and the fastest of the great ships in the fleet (see details under "Sails and rigging"). On 11 April, Howard's force arrived off Brest only to see a small enemy force join with the larger force in the safety of Brest harbour and its fortifications. The French had recently been reinforced by a force of galleys from the Mediterranean, which sank one English ship and seriously damaged another. Howard landed forces near Brest, but made no headway against the town and was by now getting low on supplies. Attempting to force a victory, he took a small force of small oared vessels on a daring frontal attack on the French galleys on 25 April. Howard himself managed to reach the ship of French admiral, Prégent de Bidoux, and led a small party to board her. The French fought back fiercely and cut the cables that attached the two ships, separating Howard from his men. It left him at the mercy of the soldiers aboard the galley, who instantly killed him.

Demoralised by the loss of its admiral and seriously short of food, the fleet returned to Plymouth. Thomas Howard, elder brother of Edward, was assigned the new Lord Admiral, and was set to the task of arranging another attack on Brittany. The fleet was not able to mount the planned attack because of adverse winds and great difficulties in supplying the ships adequately and the Mary Rose took up winter quarters in Southampton. In August the Scots joined France in war against England, but were dealt a crushing defeat at the Battle of Flodden on 9 September 1513. A follow-up attack in early 1514 was supported by a naval force that included the Mary Rose, but without any known engagements. The French and English mounted raids on each other throughout that summer, but achieved little, and both sides were by then exhausted. By autumn the war was over and a peace treaty was sealed by the marriage of Henry's sister, Mary, to French king Louis XII.

After the peace Mary Rose was placed in the reserves, "in ordinary". She was laid up for maintenance along with her sister ship the Peter Pomegranate in July 1514. In 1518 she received a routine repair and caulking, waterproofing with tar and oakum (old rope fibres) and was then assigned a small skeleton crew who lived on board the ship until 1522. She served briefly on a mission with other warships to "scour the seas" in preparation for Henry VIII's journey across the Channel to the summit with the French king Francis I at the Field of the Cloth of Gold in June 1520.

=== Second French war ===
In 1522, England was once again at war with France because of a treaty with the Holy Roman Emperor Charles V. The plan was for an attack on two fronts with an English thrust in northern France. The Mary Rose participated in the escort transport of troops in June 1522, and by 1 July the Breton port of Morlaix was captured. The fleet sailed home and the Mary Rose berthed for the winter in Dartmouth. The war raged on until 1525 and saw the Scots join the French side. Though Charles Brandon came close to capturing Paris in 1523, there was little gained either against France or Scotland throughout the war. With the defeat of the French army and capture of Francis I by Charles V's forces at the Battle of Pavia on 24 February 1525, the war was effectively over without any major gains or major victories for the English side.

=== Maintenance and "in ordinary" ===
The Mary Rose was kept in reserve from 1522 to 1545. She was once more caulked and repaired in 1527 in a newly dug dock at Portsmouth and her longboat was repaired and trimmed. Little documentation about the Mary Rose between 1528 and 1539 exists. A document written by Thomas Cromwell in 1536 specifies that the Mary Rose and six other ships were "made new" during his service under the king, though it is unclear which years he was referring to and what "made new" actually meant. A later document from January 1536 by an anonymous author states that the Mary Rose and other ships were "new made", and dating of timbers from the ship confirms some type of repair being done in 1535 or 1536. This would have coincided with the controversial dissolution of the monasteries that resulted in a major influx of funds into the royal treasury. The nature and extent of this repair is unknown. Many experts, including Margaret Rule, the project leader for the raising of the Mary Rose, wrongly presumed that it meant a complete rebuilding from clinker planking to carvel planking, and that it was only after 1536 that the ship took on the form that it had when it sank and that was eventually recovered in the 20th century. Marsden has speculated that it could even mean that the Mary Rose was originally built in a style that was closer to 15th-century ships, with a rounded, rather than square, stern and without the main deck gunports.

=== Third French war ===
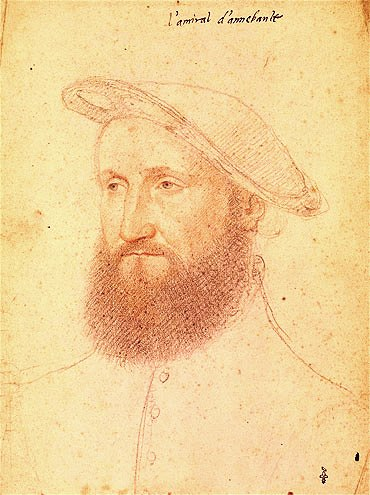
Drawing of the French admiral, Claude d'Annebault, commander of the French naval force that launched the attack on the Isle of Wight; François Clouet, January 1535

Henry's complicated marital situation and his dissolution of the monasteries angered the Pope and Catholic rulers throughout Europe, which increased England's diplomatic isolation. In 1544 Henry had agreed to attack France together with Emperor Charles V, and English forces captured Boulogne at great cost in September, but soon England was left in the lurch after Charles had achieved his objectives and brokered a separate peace.

In May 1545, the French had assembled a large fleet in the estuary of the Seine with the intent to land troops on English soil. The estimates of the size of the fleet varied considerably; between 123 and 300 vessels according to French sources; and up to 226 sailing ships and galleys according to the chronicler Edward Hall. In addition to the massive fleet, 50,000 troops were assembled at Havre de Grâce (modern-day Le Havre). An English force of 160 ships and 12,000 troops under Viscount Lisle was ready at Portsmouth by early June, before the French were ready to set sail, and an ineffective pre-emptive strike was made in the middle of the month. In early July the huge French force under the command of Admiral Claude d'Annebault set sail for England and entered the Solent unopposed with 128 ships on 16 July. The English had around 80 ships with which to oppose the French, including the flagship Mary Rose but since they had virtually no heavy galleys, the vessels that were at their best in sheltered waters like the Solent, the English fleet promptly retreated into Portsmouth harbour.

=== Battle of the Solent ===
The English were becalmed in port and unable to manoeuvre. On 19 July 1545, the French galleys advanced on the immobilised English fleet, and initially threatened to destroy a force of 13 small galleys, or "rowbarges", the only ships that were able to move against them without a wind. The wind picked up and the sailing ships were able to go on the offensive before the oared vessels were overwhelmed. Two of the largest ships, the Henry Grace à Dieu and the Mary Rose, led the attack on the French galleys in the Solent.

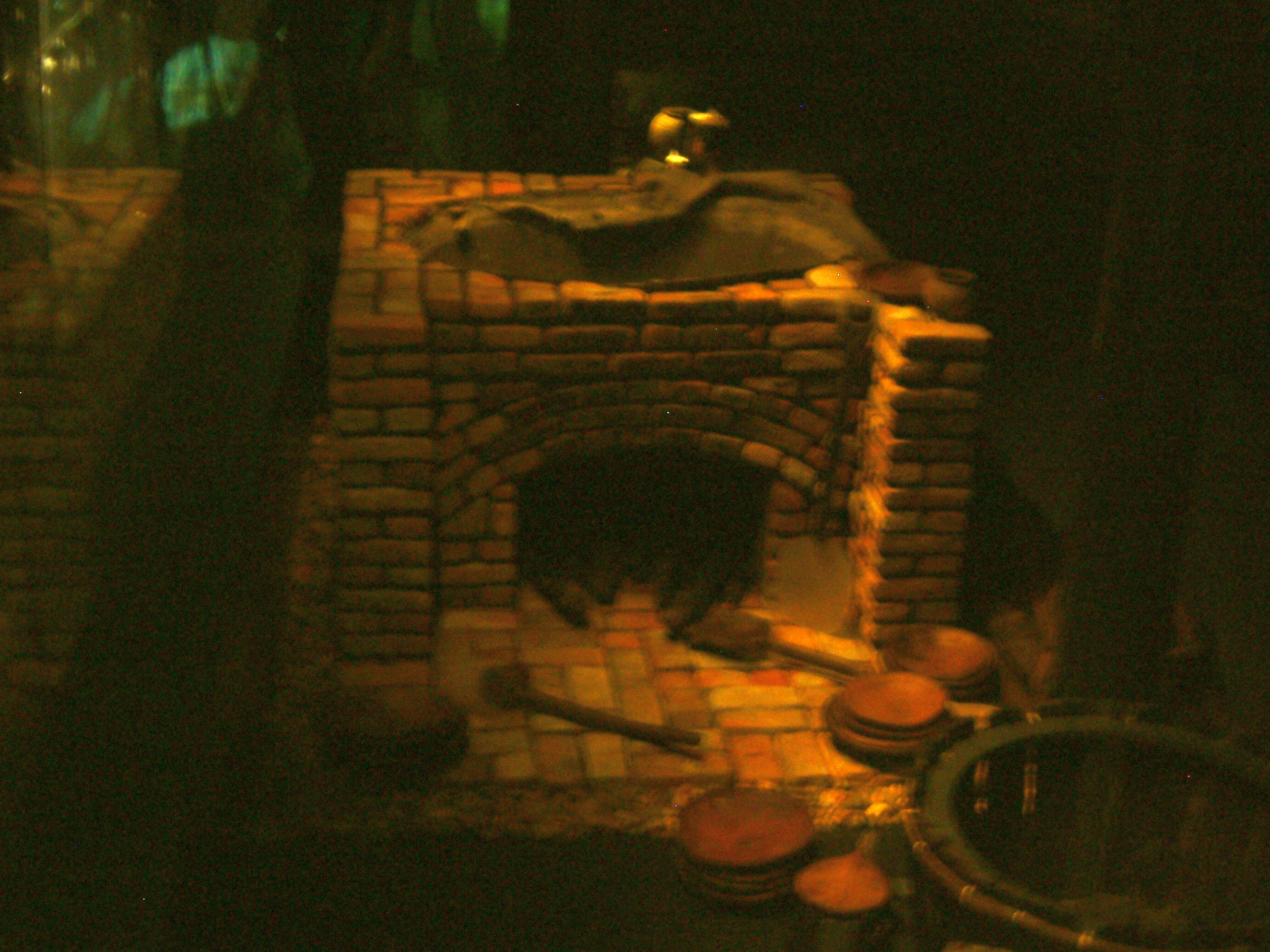
Oven & Cauldron

Early in the battle something went wrong. While engaging the French galleys the Mary Rose suddenly heeled (leaned) heavily over to her starboard (right) side and water rushed in through the open gunports. The crew was powerless to correct the sudden imbalance, and could only scramble for the safety of the upper deck as the ship began to sink rapidly. As she leaned over, equipment, ammunition, supplies and storage containers shifted and came loose, adding to the general chaos. The massive port side brick oven in the galley collapsed completely and the huge 360-litre (90 gallon) copper cauldron was thrown onto the orlop deck above. Heavy guns came free and slammed into the opposite side, impeding escape or crushing men beneath them.

For those who were not injured or killed outright by moving objects, there was little time to reach safety, especially for the men who were manning the guns on the main deck or fetching ammunition and supplies in the hold. The companionways that connected the decks with one another would have become bottlenecks for fleeing men, something indicated by the positioning of many of the skeletons recovered from the wreck. What turned the sinking into a major tragedy was the anti-boarding netting that covered the upper decks in the waist (the midsection of the ship) and the sterncastle. With the exception of the men who were stationed in the tops in the masts, most of those who managed to get up from below deck were trapped under the netting; they would have been in view of the surface, and their colleagues above, but with little or no chance to break through, and were dragged down with the ship. Out of a crew of at least 400, fewer than 35 escaped, a casualty rate of over 90%.

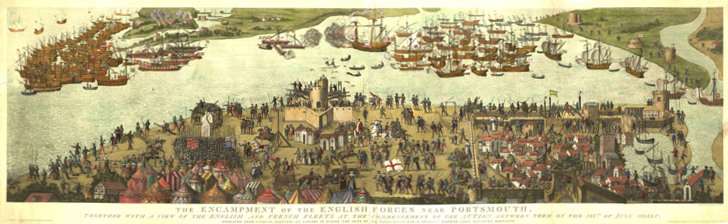
The Cowdray Engraving, depicting the Battle of the Solent. The main and foremasts of the recently sunken Mary Rose are in the middle; bodies, debris and rigging float in the water and men are clinging to the fighting tops. Southsea Castle is at centre left.

== Causes of sinking ==
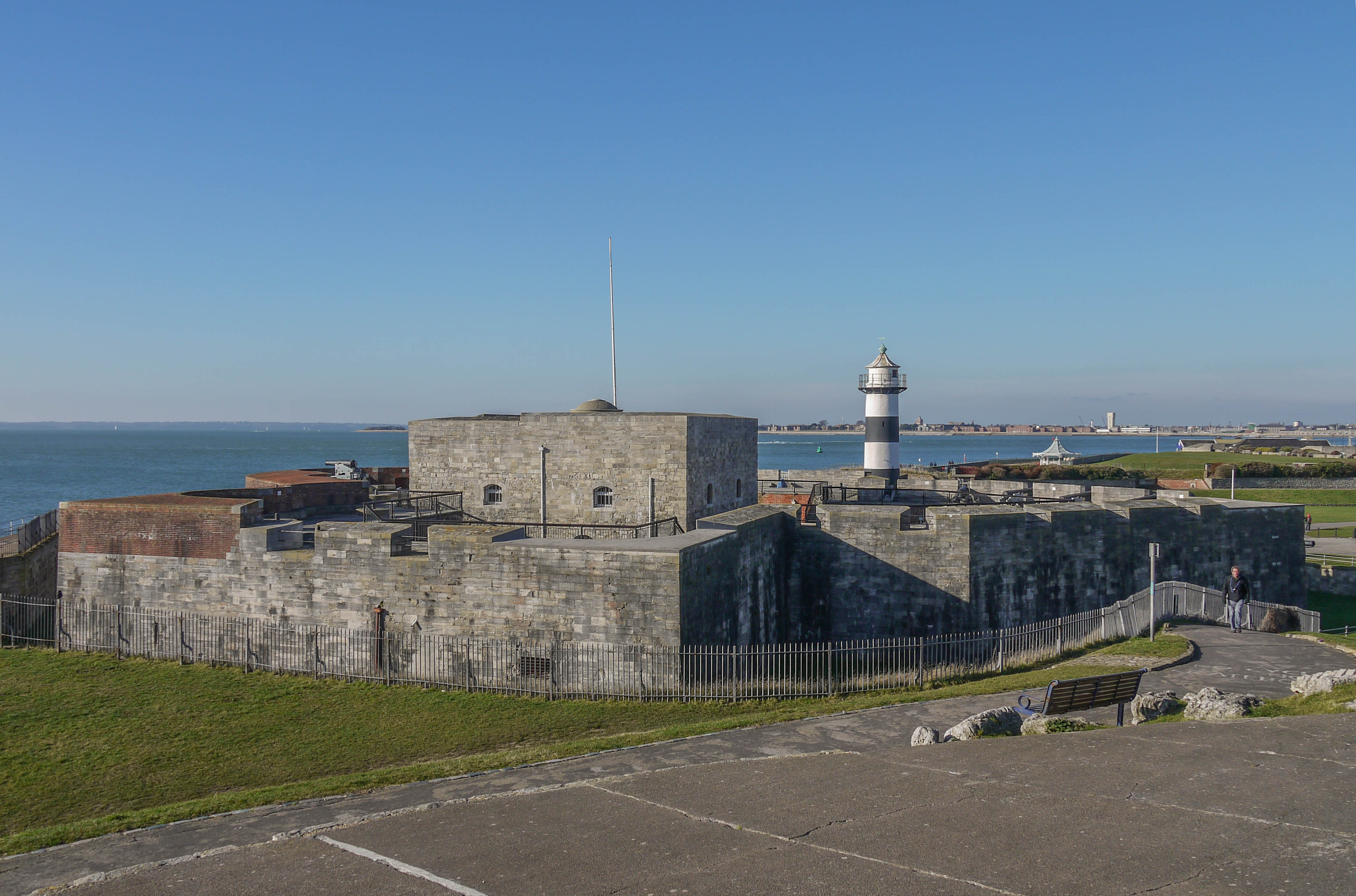
Southsea Castle, from where Henry VIII witnessed the last battle and demise of the Mary Rose. The castle has been heavily altered since that time.

=== Contemporary accounts ===
Many accounts of the sinking have been preserved, but the only confirmed eyewitness account is the testimony of a surviving Flemish crewman written down by the Holy Roman Emperor's ambassador François van der Delft in a letter dated 24 July. According to the unnamed Fleming, the ship had fired all of her guns on one side and was turning to present the guns on the other side to the enemy ship, when she was caught in a strong gust of wind, heeled and took in water through the open gunports. In a letter to William Paget dated 23 July, former Lord High Admiral John Russel claimed that the ship had been lost because of "rechenes and great negligence". Three years after the sinking, Hall's Chronicle gave the reason for the sinking as being caused by "to[o] much foly ... for she was laden with much ordinaunce, and the portes left open, which were low, & the great ordinaunce unbreached, so that when the ship should turne, the water entered, and sodainly she sanke."

Later accounts repeat the explanation that the ship heeled over while going about and that the ship was brought down because of the open gunports. A biography of Peter Carew, brother of George Carew, written by John Hooker sometime after 1575, gives the same reason for the sinking, but adds that insubordination among the crew was to blame. The biography claims that George Carew noted that the Mary Rose showed signs of instability as soon as her sails were raised. George's uncle Gawen Carew had passed by with his own ship the Matthew Gonson during the battle to inquire about the situation of his nephew's ship. In reply he was told "that he had a sorte of knaves whom he could not rule". Contrary to all other accounts, Martin du Bellay, a French cavalry officer who was present at the battle, stated that the Mary Rose had been sunk by French guns.

=== Modern theories ===
The most common explanation for the sinking among modern historians is that the ship was unstable for a number of reasons. A strong gust of wind hit the sails at a critical moment and the open gunports proved fatal, causing the ship to flood and quickly founder. Coates offered a variant of this hypothesis, which explains why a ship unexpectedly foundered after serving for several decades without sinking, even fighting in actions in the rough seas off Brittany: the ship had accumulated additional weight over the years in service and finally become unseaworthy. Marsden has questioned whether the ship was turning after firing all the guns on one side, after examination of guns recovered in the 19th and 20th centuries; guns from both sides were found still loaded. This has been interpreted to mean that something else could have gone wrong, since it is assumed that an experienced crew would not have failed to secure the gunports before making a potentially risky turn.

The most recent surveys of the ship indicate that she was modified late in her career, lending support to the idea that the Mary Rose was altered too much to be properly seaworthy. Marsden has suggested that the weight of additional heavy guns would have increased her draught so much that the waterline was less than one metre (c. 3 feet) from the gunports on the main deck.

Peter Carew's claim of insubordination has been reinterpreted by James Watt, former Medical Director-General of the Royal Navy, based on records of an epidemic of dysentery in Portsmouth which could have rendered the crew incapable of handling the ship properly. Historian Richard Barker has suggested that the crew actually knew that the ship was an accident waiting to happen, at which they balked and refused to follow orders. Marsden has noted that the Carew biography is in some details inconsistent with the sequence of events reported by both French and English eyewitnesses. It also reports that there were 700 men on board, an unusually high number. The distance in time to the event it describes may mean that it was embellished to add a dramatic touch. The report of French galleys sinking the Mary Rose as stated by Martin du Bellay has been described as "the account of a courtesan" by naval historian Maurice de Brossard. Du Bellay and his two brothers were close to king Francis I and du Bellay had much to gain from portraying the sinking as a French victory. English sources, even if biased, would have nothing to gain from portraying the sinking as the result of crew incompetence rather than conceding a victory to the much-feared gun galleys.

Dominic Fontana, a geographer at the University of Portsmouth, has voiced support for du Bellay's version of the sinking, based on the battle as it is depicted in the Cowdray Engraving and modern GIS analysis of the scene of the battle. By plotting the fleets and calculating the conjectured final manoeuvres of the Mary Rose, Fontana reached the conclusion that the ship had been hit low in the hull by the galleys and was destabilised after taking in water. He has interpreted the final heading of the ship straight due north as a failed attempt to reach the shallows at Spitbank only a few hundred metres away. This theory has been given partial support by Alexzandra Hildred, one of the experts who has worked with the Mary Rose, though she has suggested that the close proximity to Spitbank could also indicate that the sinking occurred while trying to make a hard turn to avoid running aground.

=== Experiments ===
In 2000, the Channel 4 television programme What Sank the Mary Rose? attempted to investigate the causes suggested for her sinking by means of experiments with scale models of the ship and metal weights to simulate the presence of troops on the upper decks. Initial tests showed that the ship was able to make the turn described by eyewitnesses without capsizing. In later tests, a fan was used to create a breeze similar to the one reported to have suddenly sprung up on the day of the sinking as the Mary Rose went to make the turn. As the model made the turn, the breeze in the upper works forced it to heel more than at calm, forcing the main deck gun ports below the waterline and foundering the model within a few seconds. The sequence of events closely followed what eyewitnesses had reported, particularly the suddenness with which the ship sank.

== History as a shipwreck ==
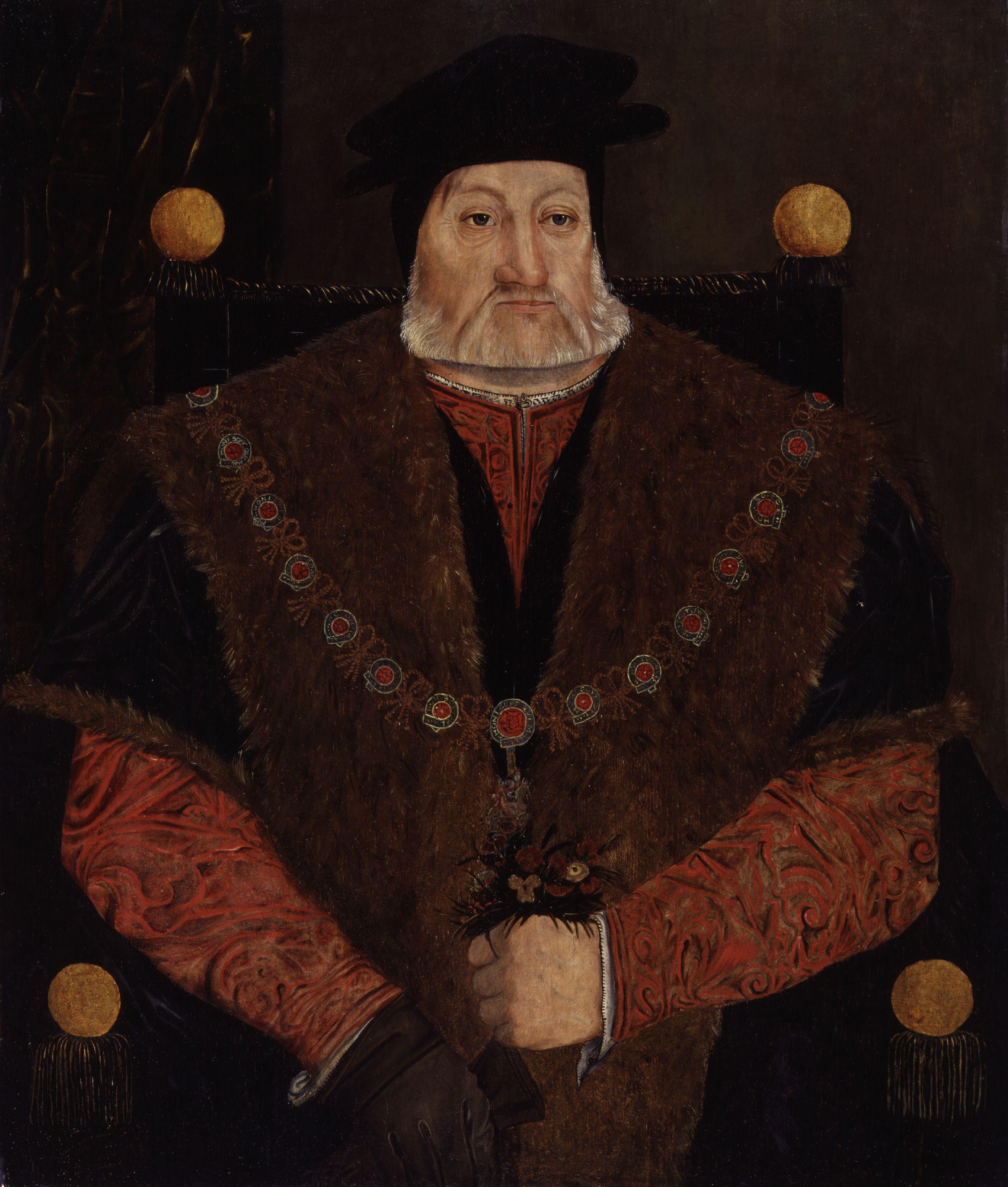
Charles Brandon, 1st Duke of Suffolk, brother-in-law of King Henry VIII through marriage with Mary Tudor, who took charge of the failed salvage operation in 1545

A salvage attempt was ordered by Secretary of State William Paget only days after the sinking, and the Duke of Suffolk, the king's brother-in-law, took charge of practical details. The operation followed the standard procedure for raising ships in shallow waters: strong cables were attached to the sunken ship and fastened to two empty ships, or hulks. At low tide, the ropes were pulled taut with capstans. When the high tide came in, the hulks rose and with them the wreck. It would then be towed into shallower water and the procedure repeated until the whole ship could be raised completely.

A list of necessary equipment was compiled by 1 August and included, among other things, massive cables, capstans, pulleys, and 40 pounds of tallow for lubrication. The proposed salvage team comprised 30 Venetian mariners and a Venetian carpenter with 60 English sailors to serve them. The two ships to be used as hulks were Jesus of Lübeck and Samson, each of 700 tons burthen and similar in size to the Mary Rose. Suffolk was so confident of success that he reassured the king that it would only be a matter of days before they could raise the Mary Rose. The optimism proved unfounded. Since the ship had settled at a 60-degree angle to starboard much of her was stuck deep into the clay of the seabed. This made it virtually impossible to pass cables under the hull and required far more lifting power than if the ship had settled on a hard seabed. An attempt to secure cables to the main mast appears only to have resulted in its being snapped off.

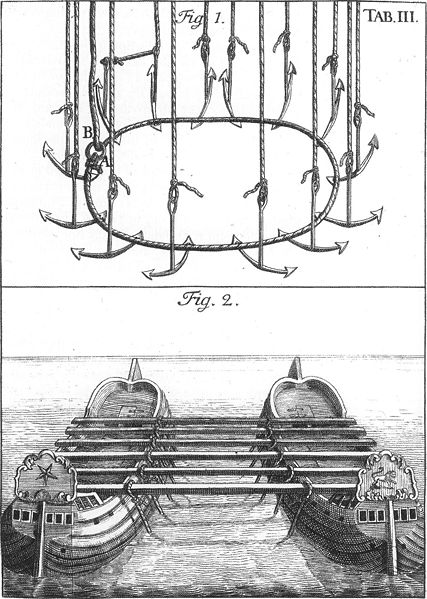
Illustration from a treatise on salvaging from 1734, showing the traditional method of raising a wreck with the help of anchors and ships or hulks as pontoons, the same method that was attempted by the Tudor era salvors

The project was successful only in raising rigging, some guns and other items. At least two other salvage teams in 1547 and 1549 received payment for raising more guns from the wreck. Despite the failure of the first salvage operation, there was still lingering belief in the possibility of retrieving the Mary Rose at least until 1546, when she was presented as part of the illustrated list of English warships called the Anthony Roll. When all hope of raising the complete ship was finally abandoned is not known. It could have been after Henry VIII's death in January 1547 or even as late as 1549, when the last guns were brought up. The Mary Rose was remembered well into the reign of Elizabeth I, and according to one of the queen's admirals, William Monson (1569–1643), the wreck was visible from the surface at low tide in the late 16th century.

=== Deterioration ===
After the sinking, the partially buried wreck created a barrier at a right angle against the currents of the Solent. Two scour pits, large underwater ditches, formed on either side of the wreck while silt and seaweed was deposited inside the ship. A deep but narrow pit formed on the upward tilting port side, while a shallower, broader pit formed on the starboard side, which had been mostly buried by the force of the impact. The abrasive actions of sand and silt carried by the currents and the activity of fungi, bacteria and wood-boring crustaceans and molluscs, such as the teredo "shipworm", began to break down the structure of the ship. Eventually the exposed wooden structure was weakened and gradually collapsed. The timbers and contents of the port side were either deposited in the scour pits and remaining ship structure or carried off by the currents. Following the collapse of the exposed parts of the ship, the site was levelled with the seabed and gradually covered by layers of sediment, concealing most of the remaining structure. During the 16th century, a hard layer of compacted clay and crushed shells formed over the ship, stabilising the site and sealing the Tudor-era deposits. Further layers of soft silt covered the site during the 18th and 19th centuries, but frequent changes in the tidal patterns and currents in the Solent occasionally exposed some of the timbers, leading to its accidental rediscovery in 1836 and aiding in locating the wreck in 1971. After the ship had been raised it was determined that about 40% of the original structure had survived.

=== Rediscovery in 19th century ===
In mid-1836, a group of five fishermen caught their nets on timbers protruding from the bottom of the Solent. They contacted a diver to help them remove the hindrance, and on 10 June, Henry Abbinett became the first person to see the Mary Rose in almost 300 years. Later, two other professional divers, John Deane and William Edwards, were employed. Using a recently invented rubber suit and metal diving helmet, Deane and Edwards began to examine the wreck and salvage items from it. Along with an assortment of timbers and wooden objects, including several longbows, they brought up several bronze and iron guns, which were sold to the Board of Ordnance for over £220 (equivalent to £21,726 in 2025). Initially, this caused a dispute between Deane (who had also brought in his brother Charles into the project), Abbinett and the fishermen who had hired them. The matter was eventually settled by allowing the fishermen a share of the proceeds from the sale of the first salvaged guns, while Deane received exclusive salvage rights at the expense of Abbinett. The wreck was soon identified as the Mary Rose from the inscriptions of one of the bronze guns manufactured in 1537.

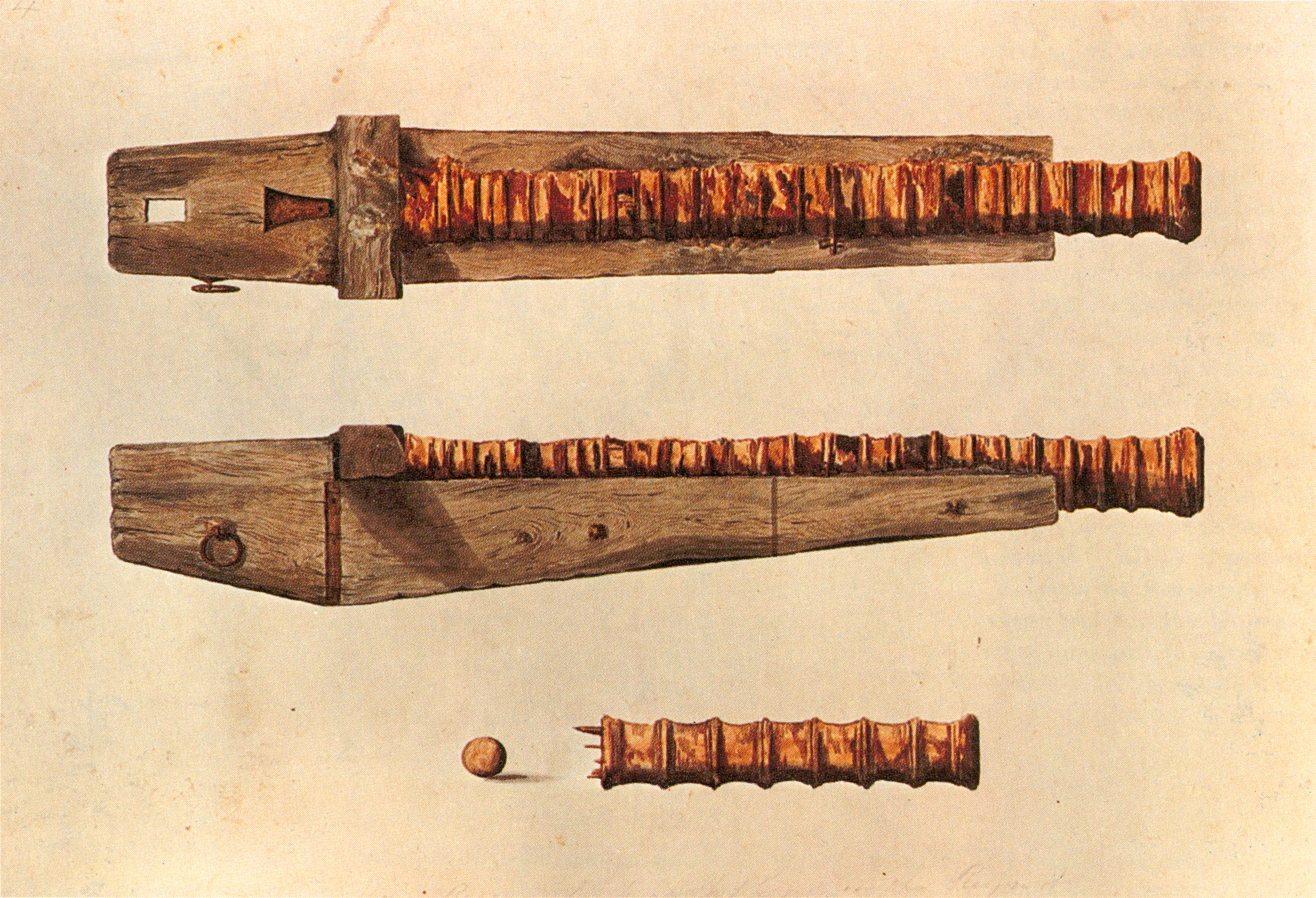
Watercolour painting of two perspectives of a sling, a wrought iron gun, complete with two-wheeled gun carriage (wheels missing) and part of another iron sling. The paintings were made to record some of the finds raised by the Deane brothers 1836–40.

The identification of the ship led to high public interest in the salvage operation and caused a great demand for the objects that were brought up. Though many of the objects could not be properly conserved at the time and subsequently deteriorated, many were documented with pencil sketches and watercolour drawings, which survive to this day. John Deane ceased working on the wreck in 1836, but returned in 1840 with new, more destructive methods. With the help of condemned bomb shells filled with gunpowder acquired from the Ordnance Board, he blasted his way into parts of the wreck. Fragments of bombs and traces of blasting craters were found during the modern excavations, but there was no evidence that Deane managed to penetrate the hard layer that had sealed off the Tudor levels. Deane reported retrieving a bilge pump and the lower part of the main mast, both of which would have been located inside the ship. The recovery of small wooden objects like longbows suggests that Deane did manage to penetrate the Tudor levels at some point, though this has been disputed by the excavation project leader Margaret Rule. Newspaper reports on Deane's diving operations in October 1840 report that the ship was clinker built, but since the sterncastle is the only part of the ship with this feature, an alternative explanation has been suggested: Deane did not penetrate the hard shelly layer that covered most of the ship, but managed only to get into remains of the sterncastle that today no longer exist. Despite the rough handling by Deane, the Mary Rose escaped the wholesale destruction by giant rakes and explosives that was the fate of other wrecks in the Solent (such as HMS Royal George).

=== Modern rediscovery ===
The modern search for the Mary Rose was initiated by the Southsea branch of the British Sub-Aqua Club in 1965 as part of a project to locate shipwrecks in the Solent. The project was under the leadership of historian, journalist and amateur diver Alexander McKee. Another group led by Lieutenant-Commander Alan Bax of the Royal Navy, sponsored by the Committee for Nautical Archaeology in London, also formed a search team. Initially the two teams had differing views on where to find the wreck, but eventually joined forces. In February 1966 a chart from 1841 was found that marked the positions of the Mary Rose and several other wrecks. The charted position coincided with a trench (one of the scour pits) that had already been located by McKee's team, and a definite location was finally established at a position 3 km (1.9 mi) south of the entrance to Portsmouth Harbour (50°46′0″N 1°06′0″W) in water with a depth of 11 m (36 feet) at low tide. Diving on the site began in 1966 and a sonar scan by Harold Edgerton in 1967–68 revealed some type of buried feature. In 1970 a loose timber was located and on 5 May 1971, the first structural details of the buried hull were identified after they were partially uncovered by winter storms.

A major problem for the team from the start was that wreck sites in the UK lacked any legal protection from plunderers and treasure hunters. Sunken ships, once being moving objects, were legally treated as chattel and were awarded to those who could first raise them. The Merchant Shipping Act 1894 also stipulated that any objects raised from a wreck should be auctioned off to finance the salvage operations, and there was nothing preventing anyone from "stealing" the wreck and making a profit. The problem was handled by forming an organisation, the Mary Rose Committee, aiming "to find, excavate, raise and preserve for all time such remains of the ship Mary Rose as may be of historical or archaeological interest".

To keep intruders at bay, the committee arranged a lease of the seabed where the wreck lay from the Portsmouth authorities, thereby discouraging anyone from trespassing on the underwater property. In hindsight this was only a legalistic charade which had little chance of holding up in a court of law. In combination with secrecy as to the exact location of the wreck, it saved the project from interference. It was not until the passing of the Protection of Wrecks Act 1973 on 5 February 1973 that the Mary Rose was declared to be of national historic interest that enjoyed full legal protection from any disturbance by commercial salvage teams. Despite this, years after the passing of the 1973 act and the excavation of the ship, lingering conflicts with salvage legislation remained a threat to the Mary Rose project as "personal" finds such as chests, clothing and cooking utensils risked being confiscated and auctioned off.

==== Survey and excavation ====
Following the discovery of the wreck in 1971, the project became known to the general public and received increasing media attention. This helped bring in more donations and equipment, primarily from private sources. By 1974 the committee had representatives from the National Maritime Museum, the Royal Navy, the BBC and local organisations. In 1974 the project received royal patronage from Prince Charles, who participated in dives on the site. This attracted yet more publicity, and also more funding and assistance. The initial aims of the Mary Rose Committee were now more officially and definitely confirmed. The committee had become a registered charity in 1974, which made it easier to raise funds, and the application for excavation and raising of the ship had been officially approved by the UK government.

By 1978 the initial excavation work had uncovered a complete and coherent site with an intact ship structure and the orientation of the hull had been positively identified as being on an almost straight northerly heading with a 60-degree heel to starboard and a slight downward tilt towards the bow. As no records of English shipbuilding techniques used in vessels like the Mary Rose survive, excavation of the ship would allow for a detailed survey of her design and shed new light on the construction of ships of the era. A full excavation also meant removing the protective layers of silt that prevented the remaining ship structure from being destroyed through biological decay and the scouring of the currents; the operation had to be completed within a predetermined timespan of a few years or it risked irreversible damage. It was also considered desirable to recover and preserve the remains of the hull if possible. For the first time, the project was faced with the practical difficulties of actually raising, conserving and preparing the hull for public display.

To handle this new, considerably more complex and expensive task, it was decided that a new organisation was needed. The Mary Rose Trust, a limited charitable trust, with representatives from many organisations would handle the need for a larger operation and a large infusion of funds. In 1979 a new diving vessel was purchased to replace the previous 12 m (39 ft) catamaran Roger Greenville which had been used from 1971. The choice fell on the salvage vessel Sleipner, the same craft that had been used as a platform for diving operations on the Vasa. The project went from a team of only twelve volunteers working four months a year to over 50 individuals working almost around the clock nine months a year. In addition, there were over 500 volunteer divers and a laboratory staff of about 70 that ran the shore base and conservation facilities. During the four diving seasons from 1979 to 1982 over 22,000 diving hours were spent on the site, an effort that amounted to 11.8 man-years.

==== Raising the ship ====
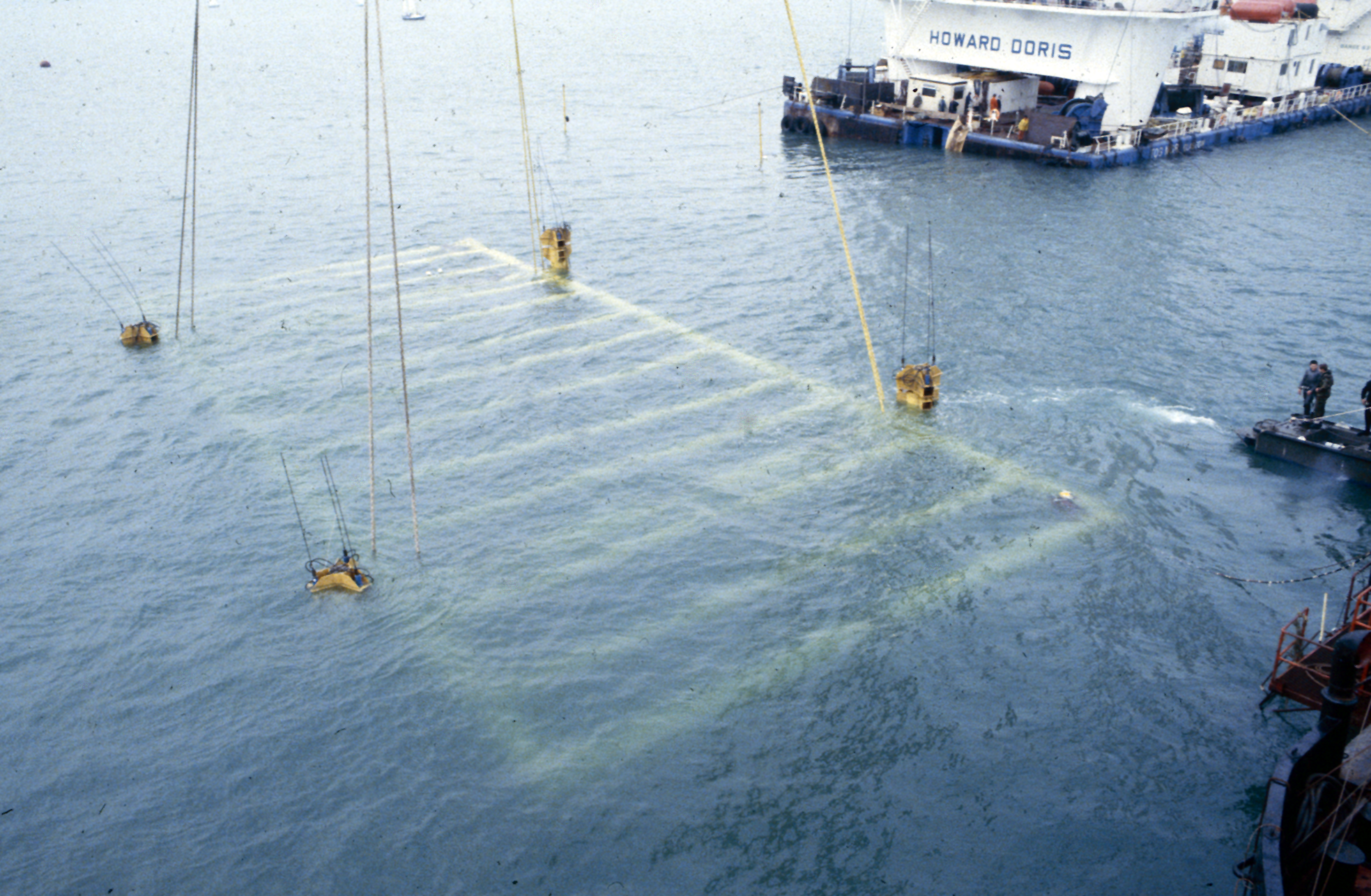
The final stages of the salvage of the Mary Rose on 11 October 1982. The lifting frame (the top of the salvage cage) can be seen just below the surface of the water, about to emerge.

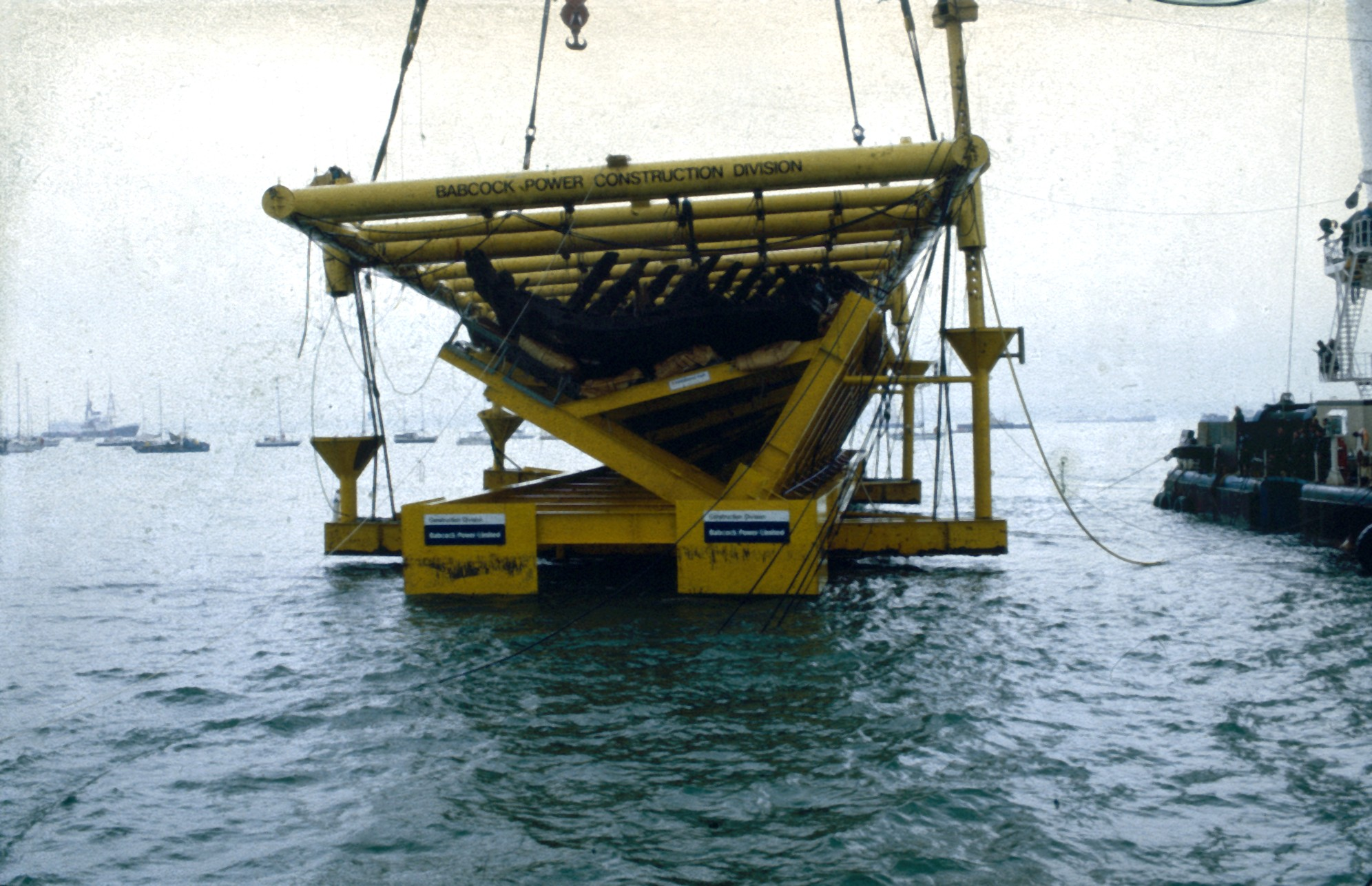
The wreck of the Mary Rose clear of the water.

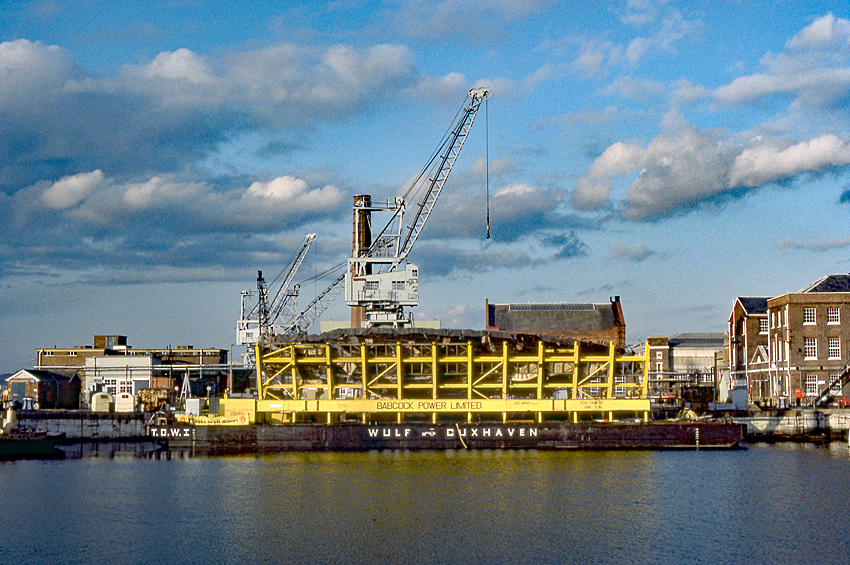
Mary Rose returns to Portsmouth

Raising the Mary Rose meant overcoming delicate problems that had never been encountered before. The raising of the Swedish warship Vasa during 1959–61 was the only comparable precedent, but it had been a relatively straightforward operation since the hull was completely intact and rested upright on the seabed. It had been raised with basically the same methods as were in use in Tudor England: cables were slung under the hull and attached to two pontoons on either side of the ship which was then gradually raised and towed into shallower waters. Only one-third of the Mary Rose was intact and she lay deeply embedded in mud. If the hull were raised in the conventional way, there was no guarantee that it would have enough structural strength to hold together out of water. Many suggestions for raising the ship were discarded, including the construction of a cofferdam around the wreck site, filling the ship with small buoyant objects (such as ping-pong balls) or even pumping brine into the seabed and freezing it so that it would float and take the hull with it. After lengthy discussions it was decided in February 1980 that the hull would first be emptied of all its contents and strengthened with steel braces and frames. It would then be lifted to the surface with floating sheerlegs attached to nylon strops passing under the hull and transferred to a cradle. It was also decided that the ship would be recovered before the end of the diving season in 1982. If the wreck stayed uncovered any longer it risked irreversible damage from biological decay and tidal scouring.

During the last year of the operation, the massive scope of full excavation and raising was beginning to take its toll on those closely involved in the project. In May 1981, Alexander McKee voiced concerns about the method chosen for raising the timbers and openly questioned Margaret Rule's position as excavation leader. McKee felt ignored in what he viewed as a project where he had always played a central role, both as the initiator of the search for the Mary Rose and other ships in the Solent, and as an active member throughout the diving operations. He had several supporters who all pointed to the risk of the project's turning into an embarrassing failure if the ship were damaged during raising operations. To address these concerns it was suggested that the hull should be placed on top of a supporting steel cradle underwater. This would avoid the inherent risks of damaging the wooden structure if it were lifted out of the water without appropriate support. The idea of using nylon strops was also discarded in favour of drilling holes through the hull at 170 points and passing iron bolts through them to allow the attachment of wires connected to a lifting frame.

In the spring of 1982, after three intense seasons of archaeological underwater work, preparations began for raising the ship. The operation soon ran into problems: early on there were difficulties with the custom-made lifting equipment; the method of lifting the hull had to be considerably altered as late as June. Divers from the Royal Engineers were brought in to do much of the underwater work. After the frame was properly attached to the hull, it was slowly jacked up on four legs to pull the ship off the seabed. The massive crane of the barge Tog Mor then moved the frame and hull, transferring them underwater to the specially designed cradle, which was padded with water-filled bags. On the morning of 11 October 1982, the final lift of the entire package of cradle, hull and lifting frame began. It was watched by the team, Prince Charles and other spectators in boats around the site. At 9:03 am, the first timbers of the Mary Rose broke the surface. A second set of bags under the hull was inflated with air, to cushion the waterlogged wood. Finally, the whole package was placed on a barge and taken to the shore. Though eventually successful, the operation was close to foundering on two occasions; first when one of the supporting legs of the lifting frame was bent and had to be removed and later when a corner of the frame, with "an unforgettable crunch", slipped more than a metre (3 feet) and came close to crushing part of the hull.

== Archaeology ==
As one of the most ambitious and expensive projects in the history of maritime archaeology, the Mary Rose project broke new ground within this field in the UK. Besides becoming one of the first wrecks to be protected under the new Protection of Wrecks Act in 1973 it also created several new precedents. It was the first time that a British privately funded project was able to apply modern scientific standards fully and without having to auction off part of the findings to finance its activities; where previous projects often had to settle for just a partial recovery of finds, everything found in connection with the Mary Rose was recovered and recorded. The raising of the vessel made it possible to establish the first historic shipwreck museum in the UK to receive government accreditation and funding. The excavation of the Mary Rose wreck site proved that it was possible to achieve a level of exactness in underwater excavations comparable to those on dry land.

Throughout the 1970s, the Mary Rose was meticulously surveyed, excavated and recorded with the latest methods within the field of maritime archaeology. Working in an underwater environment meant that principles of land-based archaeology did not always apply. Mechanical excavators, airlifts and suction dredges were used in the process of locating the wreck, but as soon as it began to be uncovered in earnest, more delicate techniques were employed. Many objects from the Mary Rose had been well preserved in form and shape, but many were quite delicate, requiring careful handling. Artefacts of all sizes were supported with soft packing material, such as old plastic ice cream containers, and some of the arrows that were "soft like cream cheese" had to be brought up in special styrofoam containers. The airlifts that sucked up clay, sand and dirt off-site or to the surface were still used, but with much greater precision since they could potentially disrupt the site. The many layers of sediment that had accumulated on the site could be used to date artefacts in which they were found, and had to be recorded properly. The various types of accretions and remnants of chemicals with artefacts were essential clues to objects that had long since broken down and disappeared, and needed to be treated with considerable care.

The excavation and raising of the ship in the 1970s and early 1980s meant that diving operations ceased, even though modern scaffolding and part of the bow were left on the seabed. The pressure on conservators to treat tens of thousands of artefacts and the high costs of conserving, storing and displaying the finds and the ship meant that there were no funds available for diving. In 2002, the UK Ministry of Defence announced plans to build two new aircraft carriers. Because of the great size of the new vessels, the outlet from Portsmouth needed to be surveyed to make sure that they could sail no matter the tide. The planned route for the underwater channel ran close to the Mary Rose wrecksite, which meant that funding was supplied to survey and excavate the site once more. Even though the planned carriers were downsized enough not to require alteration of Portsmouth outlet, the excavations had already exposed timbers and were completed in 2005. Among the most important finds was the ten-metre (32 feet) stem, the forward continuation of the keel, which provided more exact details about the original profile of the ship.

=== Finds ===
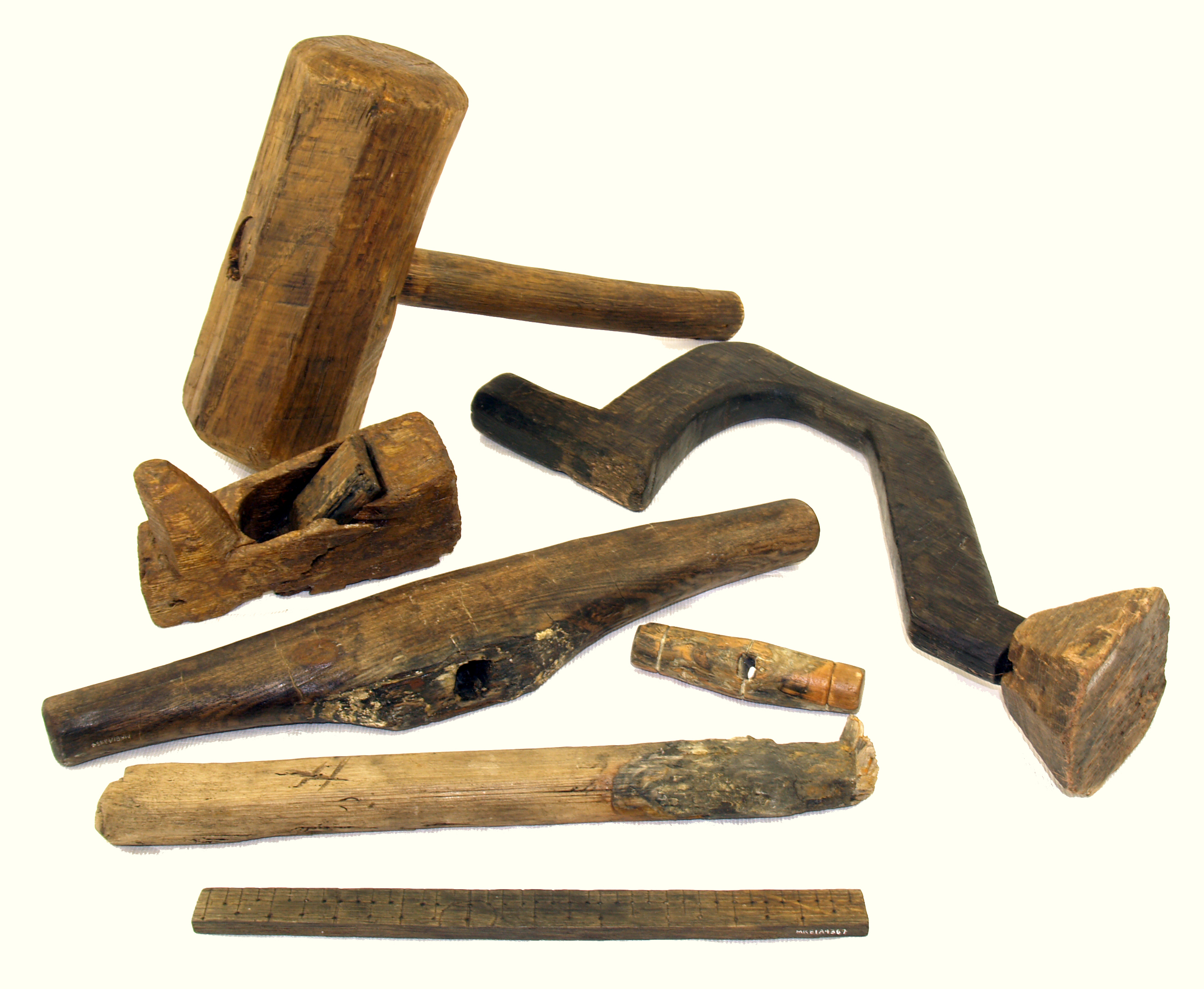
A mallet, brace, plane, ruler, and various other carpentry tools, most of which were found in chests stowed in one of the main deck cabins.

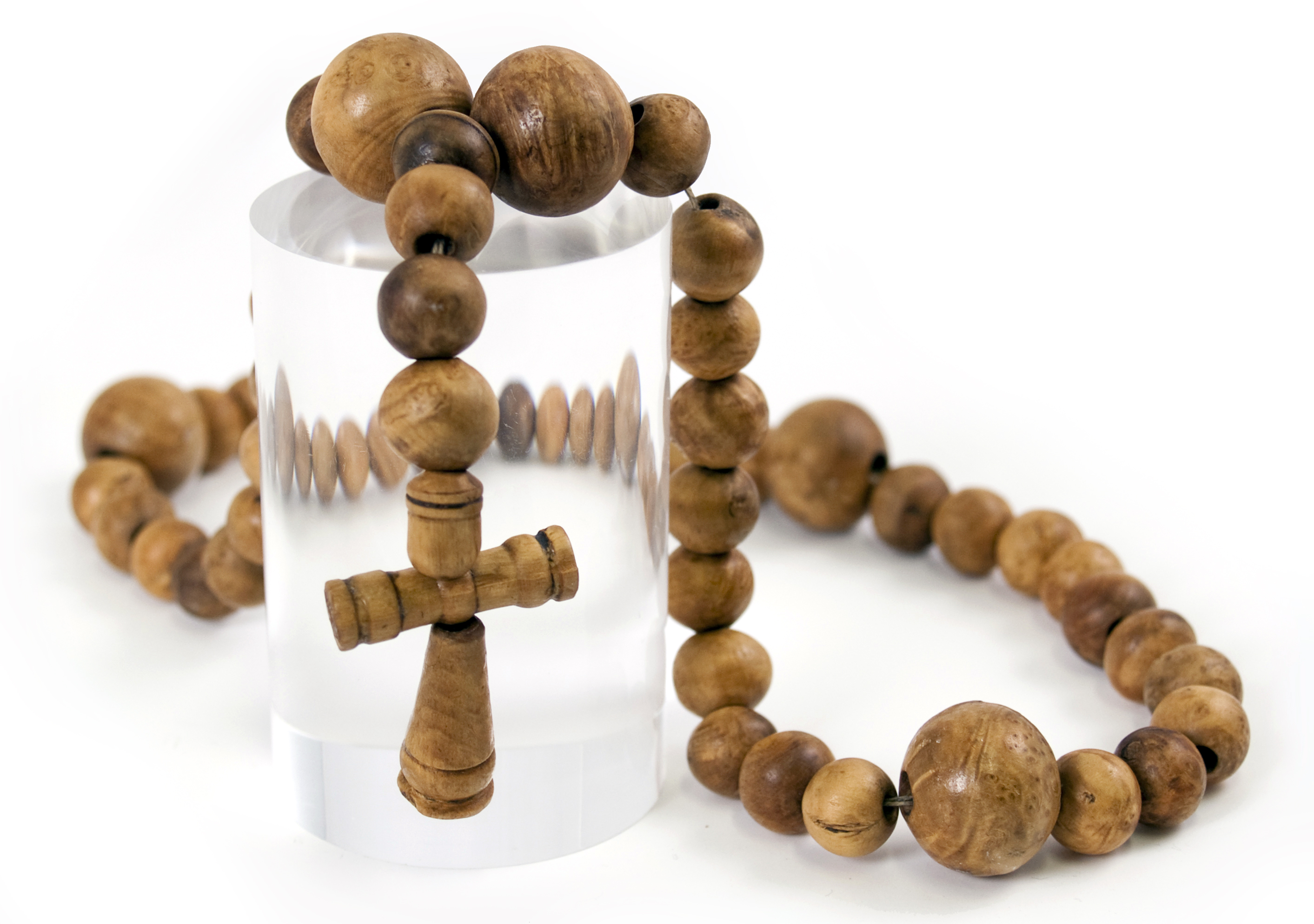
One of the many rosaries found on the Mary Rose that once belonged to one of the lower-ranking crew members

Over 26,000 artefacts and pieces of timber were raised along with remains of about half the crew members. The faces of some crew members have been reconstructed. Analysis of the crew skeletons shows many had suffered malnutrition, and had evidence of rickets, scurvy, and other deficiency diseases. Crew members also developed arthritis through the stresses on their joints from heavy lifting and maritime life generally, and suffered bone fractures. As the ship was intended to function as a floating, self-contained community, she was stocked with victuals (food and drink) that could sustain her inhabitants for extended periods of time. The casks used for storage on the Mary Rose have been compared with those from a Basque whale ship wrecked in Red Bay, Newfoundland and Labrador c. 1565. (Note: This wreck is numbered 24M by its excavators, identified as the whaler San Juan. This ship had a large number of casks used to store whale oil and these have been extensively investigated.) and have revealed that they were of better quality, more robust and reliable, an indication that supplies for the Tudor navy were given high priority, and their requirements set a high standard for cask manufacturing at the time.

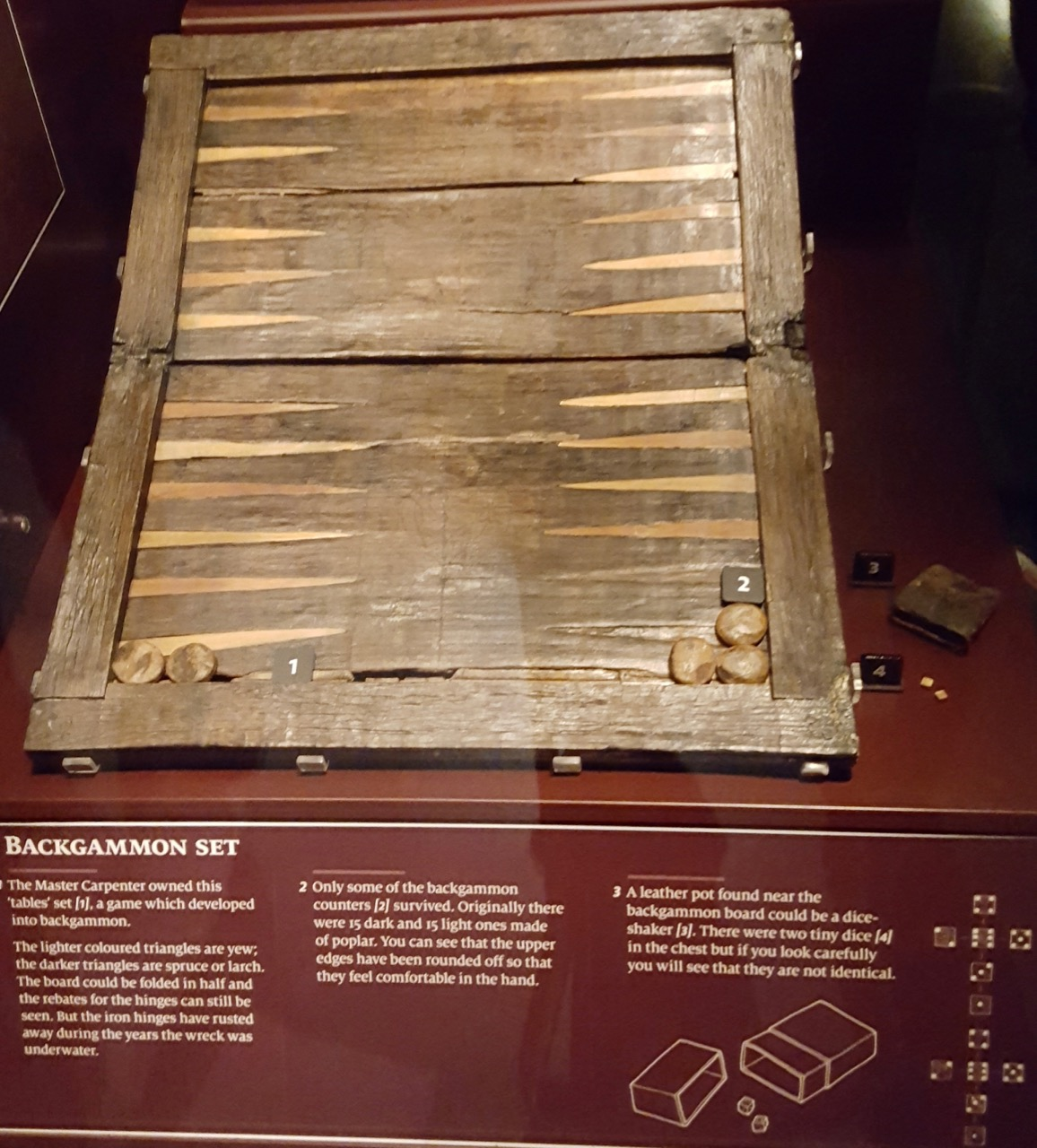
A Ludus Anglicorum set (a predecessor of modern backgammon), owned by the master carpenter.

As a miniature society at sea, the wreck of the Mary Rose held personal objects belonging to individual crew members. This included clothing, games, various items for spiritual or recreational use, and objects related to mundane everyday tasks such as personal hygiene, fishing, and sewing. The master carpenter's chest, for example, contained an early backgammon set, a book, three plates, a sundial, and a tankard, goods suggesting he was relatively wealthy.

The ship carried several skilled craftsmen and was equipped for handling both routine maintenance and repairing extensive battle damage. In and around one of the cabins on the main deck under the sterncastle, archaeologists found a "collection of woodworking tools ... unprecedented in its range and size", consisting of eight chests of carpentry tools. Along with loose mallets and tar pots used for caulking, this variety of tools belonged to one or several of the carpenters employed on the Mary Rose.

Many of the cannons and other weapons from the Mary Rose have provided invaluable physical evidence about 16th-century weapon technology. The surviving gunshields are almost all from the Mary Rose, and the four small cast iron hailshot pieces are the only known examples of this type of weapon.

Animal remains have been found in the wreck of the Mary Rose. These include the skeletons of a rat, a frog and a dog. The dog, an English Toy Terrier (Black & Tan), was between eighteen months and two years in age, was found near the hatch to the ship's carpenter's cabin and is presumed to have been brought aboard as a ratter. Nine barrels have been found to contain bones of cattle, indicating that they contained pieces of beef butchered and stored as ship's rations. The bones of pigs and fish, stored in baskets, have also been found.

==== Musical instruments ====
Two fiddles, a bow, a still shawm or douçaine, three three-hole pipes, and a tabor drum with a drumstick were found throughout the wreck. These would have been used for the personal enjoyment of the crew and to provide a rhythm to work on the rigging and turning the capstans on the upper decks. The tabor drum is the earliest known example of its kind and the drumstick is of a previously unknown design. The tabor pipes are considerably longer than any known examples from the period. Their discovery proved that contemporary illustrations, previously viewed with some suspicion, were accurate depictions of the instruments. Before the discovery of the Mary Rose shawm, an early predecessor to the oboe, instrument historians had been puzzled by references to "still shawms", or "soft" shawms, that were said to have a sound that was less shrill than earlier shawms. The still shawm disappeared from the musical scene in the 16th century, and the instrument found on the Mary Rose is the only surviving example. A reproduction has been made and played. Combined with a pipe and tabor, it provides a "very effective bass part" that would have produced "rich and full sound, which would have provided excellent music for dancing on board ship". Only a few other fiddle-type instruments from the 16th century exist, but none of them of the type found on the Mary Rose. Reproductions of both fiddles have been made, though less is known of their design than the shawm since the neck and strings were missing.

==== Navigation tools ====
In the remains of a small cabin in the bow of the ship and in a few other locations around the wreck was found the earliest dated set of navigation instruments in Europe found so far: compasses, divider calipers, a stick used for charting, protractors, sounding leads, tide calculators and a logreel, an instrument for calculating speed. Several of these objects are not only unique in having such an early, definite dating, but also because they pre-date written records of their use; protractors would have reasonably been used to measure bearings and courses on maps, but sea charts are not known to have been used by English navigators during the first half of the 16th century, compasses were not depicted on English ships until the 1560s, and the first mention of a logreel is from 1574.

==== Barber-surgeon's cabin ====
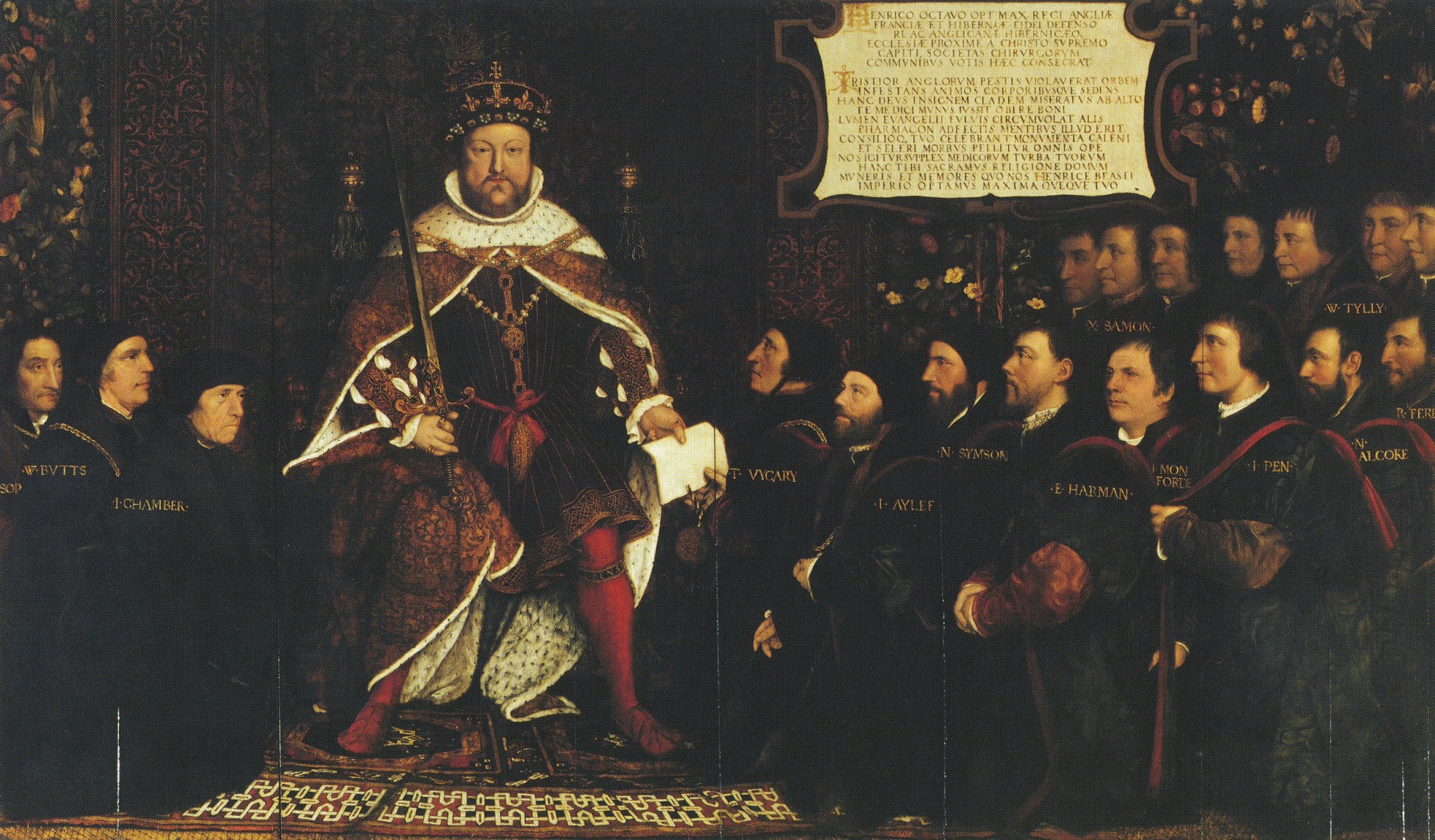
Along with the medical equipment were also personal items belonging to the barber-surgeon, including an expensive silk velvet coif identical to those worn by the members of the Worshipful Company of Barbers in this painting by Hans Holbein the Younger from 1540.

The cabin located on the main deck underneath the sterncastle is thought to have belonged to the barber-surgeon. He was a trained professional who saw to the health and welfare of the crew and acted as the medical expert on board. The most important of these finds were found in an intact wooden chest which contained over 60 objects relating to the barber-surgeon's medical practice: the wooden handles of a complete set of surgical tools and several shaving razors (although none of the steel blades had survived), a copper syringe for wound irrigation and treatment of venereal diseases, and even a skilfully crafted feeding bottle for feeding incapacitated patients. More objects were found around the cabin, such as earscoops, shaving bowls and combs. With this wide selection of tools and medicaments the barber-surgeon, along with one or more assistants, could set bone fractures, perform amputations and deal with other acute injuries, treat a number of diseases and provide crew members with a minimal standard of personal hygiene.

==== Hatch ====
One of the first scientifically confirmed ratters was a terrier and whippet dog crossbreed who spent his short life on the Mary Rose. The dog, named Hatch by researchers, was discovered in 1981 during the underwater excavation of the ship. Hatch's main duty was to kill rats on board the ship. Based on the DNA work performed on Hatch's teeth, he was a young adult male, 18–24 months old, with a brown coat. Hatch's skeleton is on display in the Mary Rose Museum in Portsmouth Historic Dockyard.

=== Conservation ===
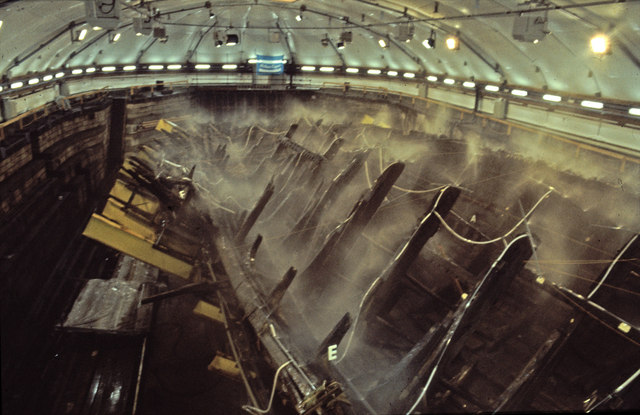
The Mary Rose being sprayed with water at the facility in Portsmouth in March 1984. Between December 1984 and July 1985 the steel cradle was gradually rotated to stand with the keel in an almost upright position.

Preservation of the Mary Rose and her contents was an essential part of the project from the start. Though many artefacts, especially those that were buried in silt, had been preserved, the long exposure to an underwater environment had rendered most of them sensitive to exposure to air after recovery. Archaeologists and conservators had to work in tandem from the start to prevent deterioration of the artefacts. After recovery, finds were placed in so-called passive storage, which would prevent any immediate deterioration before the active conservation which would allow them to be stored in an open-air environment. Passive storage depended on the type of material that the object was made of, and could vary considerably. Smaller objects from the most common material, wood, were sealed in polyethylene bags to preserve moisture. Timbers and other objects that were too large to be wrapped were stored in unsealed water tanks. Growth of fungi and microbes that could degrade wood were controlled by various techniques, including low-temperature storage, chemicals, and in the case of large objects, common pond snails that consumed wood-degrading organisms but not the wood itself.

Other organic materials such as leather, skin and textiles were treated similarly, by keeping them moist in tanks or sealed plastic containers. Bone and ivory was desalinated to prevent damage from salt crystallisation, as were glass, ceramic and stone. Iron, copper and copper alloy objects were kept moist in a sodium sesquicarbonate solution to prevent oxidisation and reaction with the chlorides that had penetrated the surface. Alloys of lead and pewter are inherently stable in the atmosphere and generally require no special treatment. Silver and gold were the only materials that required no special passive storage.

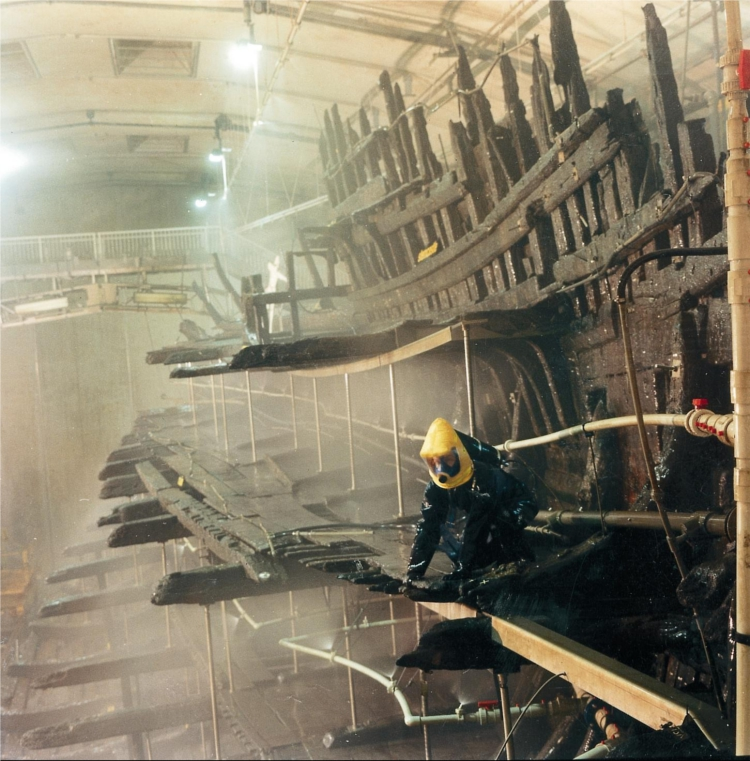
The hull of the Mary Rose being sprayed at the facility in Portsmouth while a technician services the system

Conserving the hull of the Mary Rose was the most complicated and expensive task for the project. In 2002 a donation of £4,800,000 (equivalent to £8,900,000 in 2025) from the Heritage Lottery Fund and equivalent monetary support from the Portsmouth City and Hampshire County Councils was needed to keep the work with conservation on schedule. During passive conservation, the ship structure could for practical reasons not be completely sealed, so instead it was regularly sprayed with filtered, recycled water that was kept at a temperature of 2 to 5 °C (36 to 41 °F) to keep it from drying out. Drying waterlogged wood that has been submerged for several centuries without appropriate conservation causes considerable shrinkage (20–50%) and leads to severe warping and cracking as water evaporates from the cellular structure of the wood. The substance polyethylene glycol (PEG) had been used before on archaeological wood, and was during the 1980s being used to conserve the Vasa. After almost ten years of small-scale trials on timbers, an active three-phase conservation programme of the hull of the Mary Rose began in 1994. During the first phase, which lasted from 1994 to 2003, the wood was sprayed with low-molecular-weight PEG to replace the water in the cellular structure of the wood. From 2003 to 2010, a higher-molecular-weight PEG was used to strengthen the mechanical properties of the outer surface layers. The third phase consisted of a controlled air drying ending in 2016. Researchers are planning on using magnetic nanoparticles to remove iron in the ship's wood to reduce the production of harmful sulfuric acid that is causing deterioration.

The wreck site is legally protected. Under the "Protection of Wrecks Act 1973" (1973 c. 33) any interference with the site requires a licence. The site is listed as being of "historical, archaeological or artistic importance" by Historic England.

== Display ==
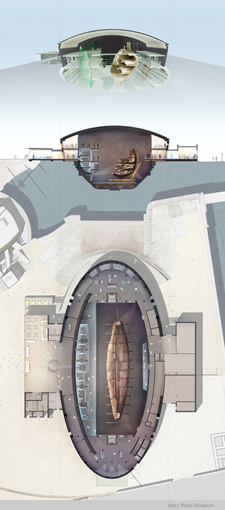
Concept plan of the new Mary Rose Museum by Wilkinson Eyre Architects

After the decision to raise the Mary Rose, discussions ensued as to where she would eventually go on permanent display. The east end of Portsea Island at Eastney emerged as an early alternative, but was rejected because of parking problems and the distance from the dockyard where she was originally built. Placing the ship next to the famous flagship of Horatio Nelson, HMS Victory, at Portsmouth Historic Dockyard was proposed in July 1981. A group called the Maritime Preservation Society even suggested Southsea Castle, where Henry VIII had witnessed the sinking, as a final resting place and there was widespread scepticism to the dockyard location. At one point a county councillor even threatened to withdraw promised funds if the dockyard site became more than an interim solution. As costs for the project mounted, there was a debate in the Council chamber and in the local paper The News as to whether the money could be spent more appropriately. Although author David Childs writes that in the early 1980s "the debate was as a fiery one", the project was never seriously threatened because of the great symbolic importance of the Mary Rose to the naval history of both Portsmouth and England.

Since the mid-1980s, the hull of the Mary Rose has been kept in a covered dry dock while undergoing conservation. Although the hull has been open to the public for viewing, the need for keeping the ship saturated first with water and later a polyethylene glycol (PEG) solution meant that, before 2013, visitors were separated from the hull by a glass barrier. By 2007, the specially built ship hall had been visited by over seven million visitors since it first opened on 4 October 1983, just under a year after the wreck was successfully raised.

A separate Mary Rose Museum was housed in a structure called No. 5 Boathouse near the ship hall and was opened to the public on 9 July 1984, containing displays explaining the history of the ship and a small number of conserved artefacts, from entire bronze cannons to household items. In September 2009 the temporary Mary Rose display hall was closed to visitors to facilitate construction of the new £35,000,000 (equivalent to £55,800,000 in 2025) museum building, which opened to the public on 31 May 2013.

The new Mary Rose Museum was designed by architects Wilkinson Eyre, Perkins+Will and built by construction firm Warings. The construction has been challenging because the museum has been built over the ship in the dry dock which is a listed monument. During construction of the museum, conservation of the hull continued inside a sealed "hotbox". In April 2013 the polyethylene glycol sprays were turned off and the process of controlled airdrying began. In 2016 the "hotbox" was removed and for the first time since 1545, the ship was revealed dry. This new museum displays most of the artefacts recovered from within the ship in context with the conserved hull. As of 2018, the new museum has been visited by over 1.8 million people, and saw 189,702 visitors in 2019.

Objects of the Mary Rose

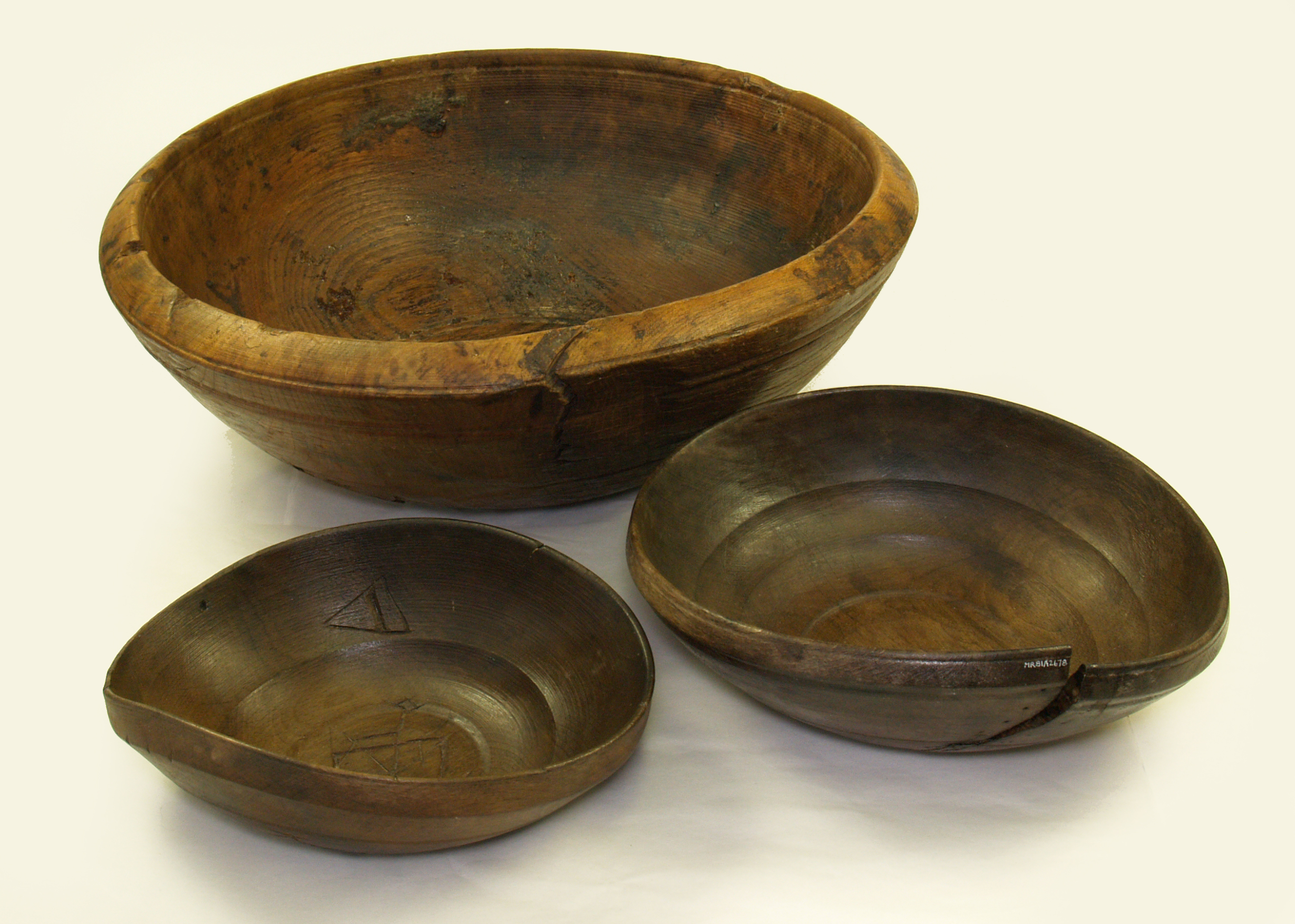

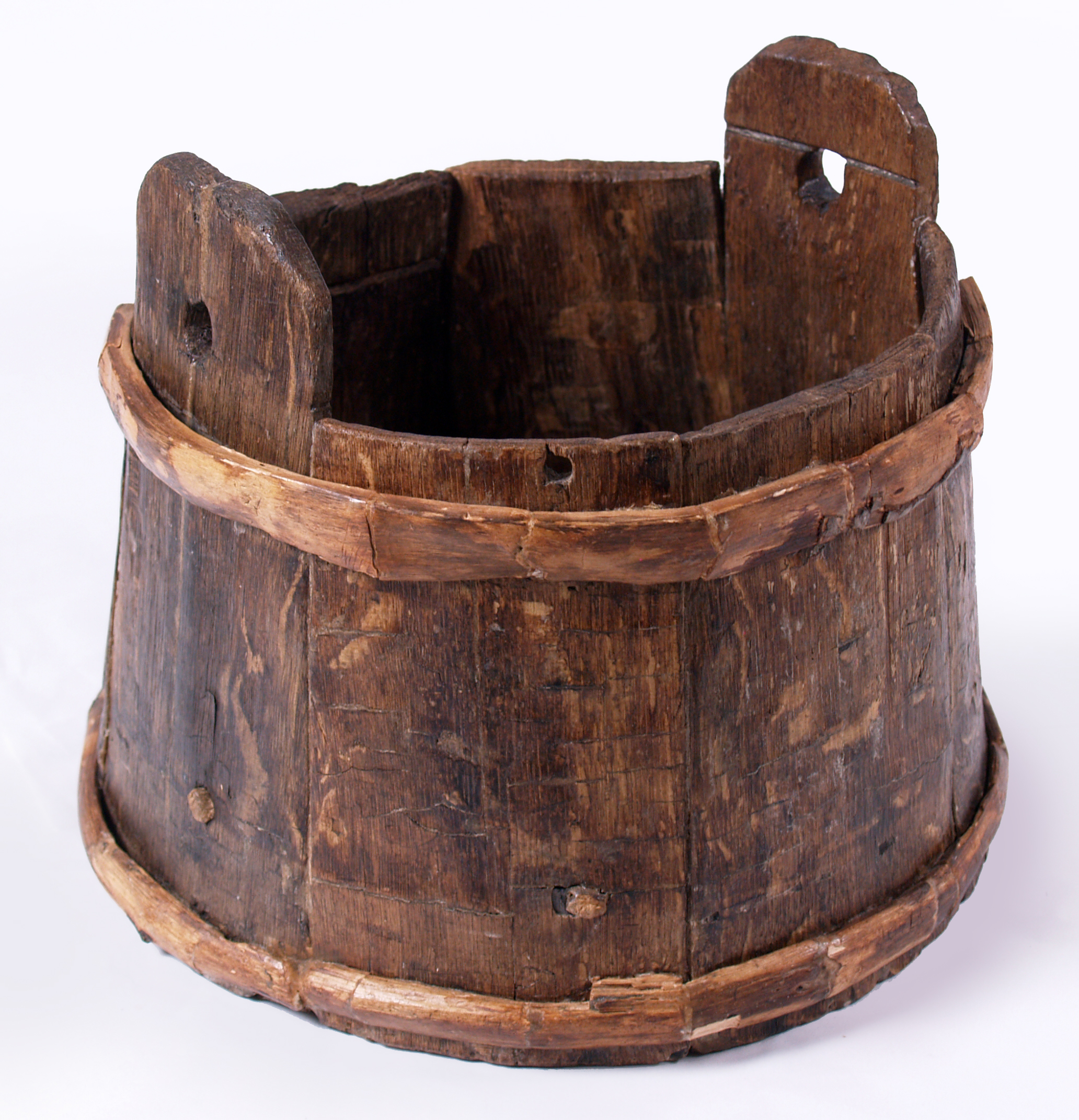

== See also ==
- Archaeology of shipwrecks – Study of human activity through the analysis of shipwreck artifacts
- Batavia – Dutch East India Company flagship
- Kronan – Swedish Navy ship of the 1670s
- Mars – Swedish warship that was built between 1563 and 1564
- HMS Gloucester – British frigate wrecked in 1682
- Vasa – 17th-century Swedish warship
