= Chris Wilkinson (architect) =

British architect (1945–2021)

- Born: Christopher John Wilkinson; 1 July 1945; Amersham, Buckinghamshire
- Died: 14 December 2021 (aged 76)
- Occupation: Architect
- Spouse: Diana Edmunds
- Children: 2
- Practice: WilkinsonEyre
- Projects: Magna Science Adventure Centre, Gateshead Millennium Bridge, Guangzhou International Finance Center, and the Gardens by the Bay

Christopher John Wilkinson OBE RA (1 July 1945 – 14 December 2021) was a British architect and co-founder of the architecture firm WilkinsonEyre. He was known for his techno-centric designs and execution of projects ranging from office spaces, factory floors, skyscrapers to botanical gardens. Some of his projects included the Magna Science Adventure Centre, Gateshead Millennium Bridge, Guangzhou International Finance Center, and the Gardens by the Bay in Singapore.

Wilkinson was elected a member of the Royal Academy of Arts in 2006, and was awarded an OBE in the Millennium Honours List for his contributions to architecture. His firm, WilkinsonEyre, was the first to win back to back RIBA Stirling Prizes in 2001 and 2002.

== Early life ==
Wilkinson was born in Amersham, Buckinghamshire, on 1 July 1945. His mother Norma (née Treleaven Beer) had participated in World War II, while his father was a surveyor with the British multinational consumer goods company Unilever. He studied at St Albans School, Hertfordshire, where he was introduced to art foundation and drawing. He graduated with a degree in architecture from the Polytechnic of Central London in 1970.

== Career ==
Wilkinson started his career working for the English architect Denys Lasdun who was then working on the Royal National Theatre. During this period he took some time off to travel to Greece. During this time, he came into contact with the works of English architects Norman Foster and Richard Rogers. He returned back and applied to both of their design firms and later joined Norman Foster's firm in 1971. At the firm, he worked with Foster's partner, Michael Hopkins and went on to work for Hopkins when he started his own firm in 1976. Some of the projects that Wilkinson worked on during this time included renovation of 10 Trinity Square, which was to be Willis Faber and Dumas' headquarters, and Greene King Brewery. In 1981, he moved on to work with Richard Rogers's firm, where he worked on the Lloyd's of London building. While working with Foster, Hopkins, and Rogers, he encountered high-tech architecture, a British modernist movement that highlights a building’s structural elements.

Wilkinson started his own design firm in 1983 and partnered with Jim Eyre in 1987 to form WilkinsonEyre. The duo initially worked on smaller projects handed down by Rogers and Hopkins. Their first major work was the design for the Stratford Market Depot on the London Underground's Jubilee line extension. The project included maintenance facilities, office spaces, and other related facilities, and was built as a large steel structure with a long arc supported by steel columns, in what would later go on to become a hallmark of the duo's designs. The work was documented in his book Supersheds (1991) and revived interest in the concept of an "universal space" which included steel space-frames that held suspended canopies and would be the foundation for many structures including railway stations, supermarkets, and even airports.

Wilkinson worked on the Dyson company's headquarters in Malmesbury in 1992. His partnership with the company's founder James Dyson would continue for over three decades and include many facilities including offices, and even the student accommodation for Dyson Institute of Engineering and Technology. The flagship store that he designed for the company in Paris in 2000 had them placing vacuums on pedestals like artwork. The English newspaper The Guardian wrote about the work and said that "It began a trend for technology stores designed like contemporary art galleries, which brands such as Apple and Samsung have since taken to extremes."

Wilkinson's 2001 work on the Magna Science Adventure Centre in Rotherham, won the firm a RIBA Stirling Prize. The work was considered a post-industrial design aiming to reimagine huge and redundant steelworks within large industrial buildings. Similarly, his work on the Gateshead Millennium Bridge across the Tyne, also called as "blinking bridge" had two giant parabolic arcs, one for pedestrian movement and the other supporting it and rotating on an axis is considered an icon of the region's riverside regeneration program. The firm won their second Stirling prize in 2002 for this work, making it the only firm to win the award in back-to-back years. Around this time, Wilkinson and his firm took up international projects including the Guangzhou International Finance Center a skyscraper in Guangzhou in China, and the Gardens by the Bay, an urban nature park in Singapore. Both of these projects won RIBA's Lubetkin international prize in 2012 and 2013.

Some of his other projects included the Mary Rose Museum, Liverpool Arena and Convention Centre, Waterfront Museum Swansea, Forum Project at University of Exeter, the new Earth Sciences building at Oxford University, and the Crown Sydney Hotel. In 2018, his firm was commissioned by the Marylebone Cricket Club to redesign the Compton and Edrich stands at Lord's Cricket Ground, which was completed in 2021. Earlier, in 2015, Wilkinson was commissioned to redevelop Victorian-era industrial gasholders in King's Cross, London into modern residential apartments and office spaces, in what was then one of the largest regeneration projects in Europe. Wilkinson said that the project built on an idea of a watch, with the gasholders' interlocking cylinders resembling the watch's movement mechanism with cogs and gears. Wilkinson and his firm were also commissioned to redevelop the Battersea Power Station into a mixed office, retail, and residential space. The project is expected to open in 2022 and include Apple's UK headquarters amongst others.

Wilkinson was elected to the Royal Academy of Arts in 2006, granted an Honorary Fellowship of the American Institute of Architecture in 2007, and was appointed an Officer of the Order of the British Empire in the Millennium Honours List for his contribution to architecture. He became a Commissioner of English Heritage in 2007 having previously been a member of the English Heritage/ Commission for Architecture and the Built Environment Urban Panel.

In addition to his practice work, Wilkinson won awards for his work with art and design. In 1996, he was named designer of the year by both the Design Council and FX. His publications include Supersheds, an exploration of the history and evolution of large-volume universal spaces. His sketchbooks that documented his thinking and design process were exhibited at the Royal Academy in 2015. Wilkinson painted, working with acrylic paints.

== Personal life ==
Wilkinson married his wife Diana (née Edmunds) in 1976. She was a supermodel in the 1970s and later went on to be an artist. The couple had two children.

Wilkinson died on 14 December 2021, at the age of 76.

== Select architectural works ==
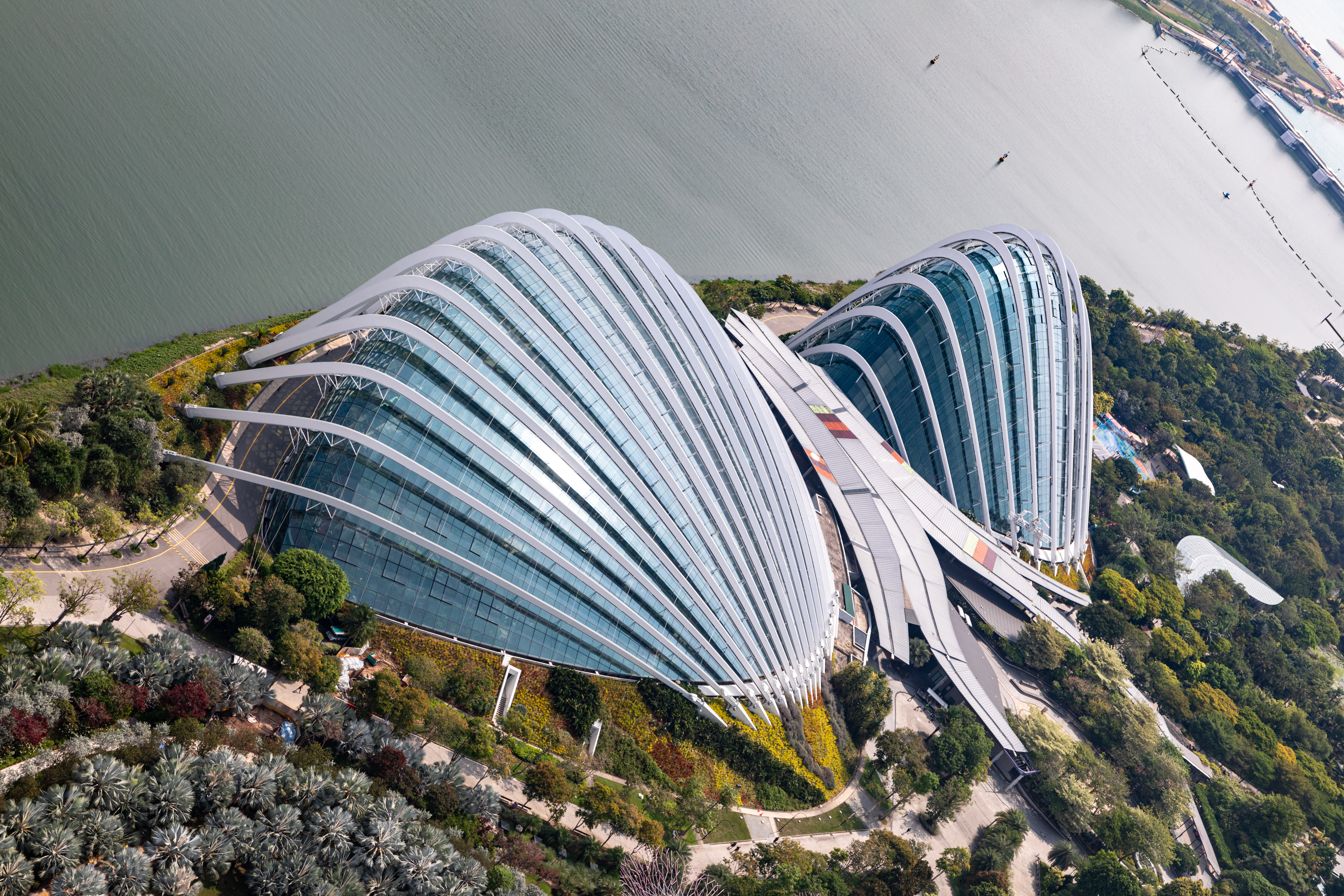
Gardens by the Bay, Singapore

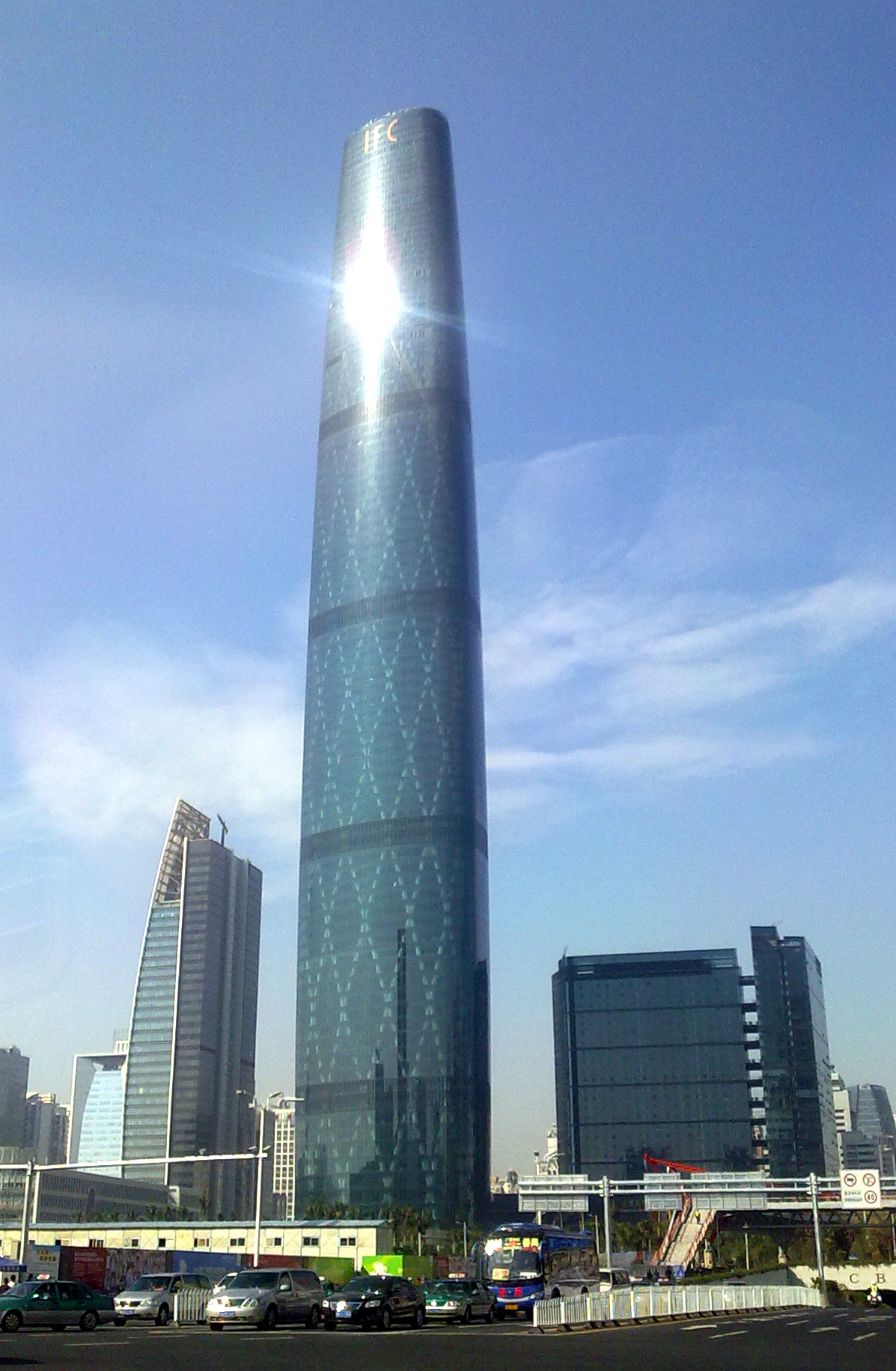
Guangzhou International Finance Center, Guangzhou, China

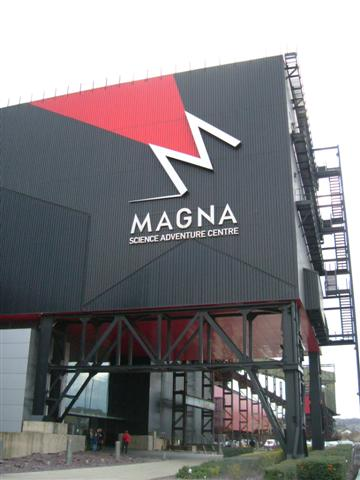
Magna Science Adventure Centre, Rotherham, United Kingdom

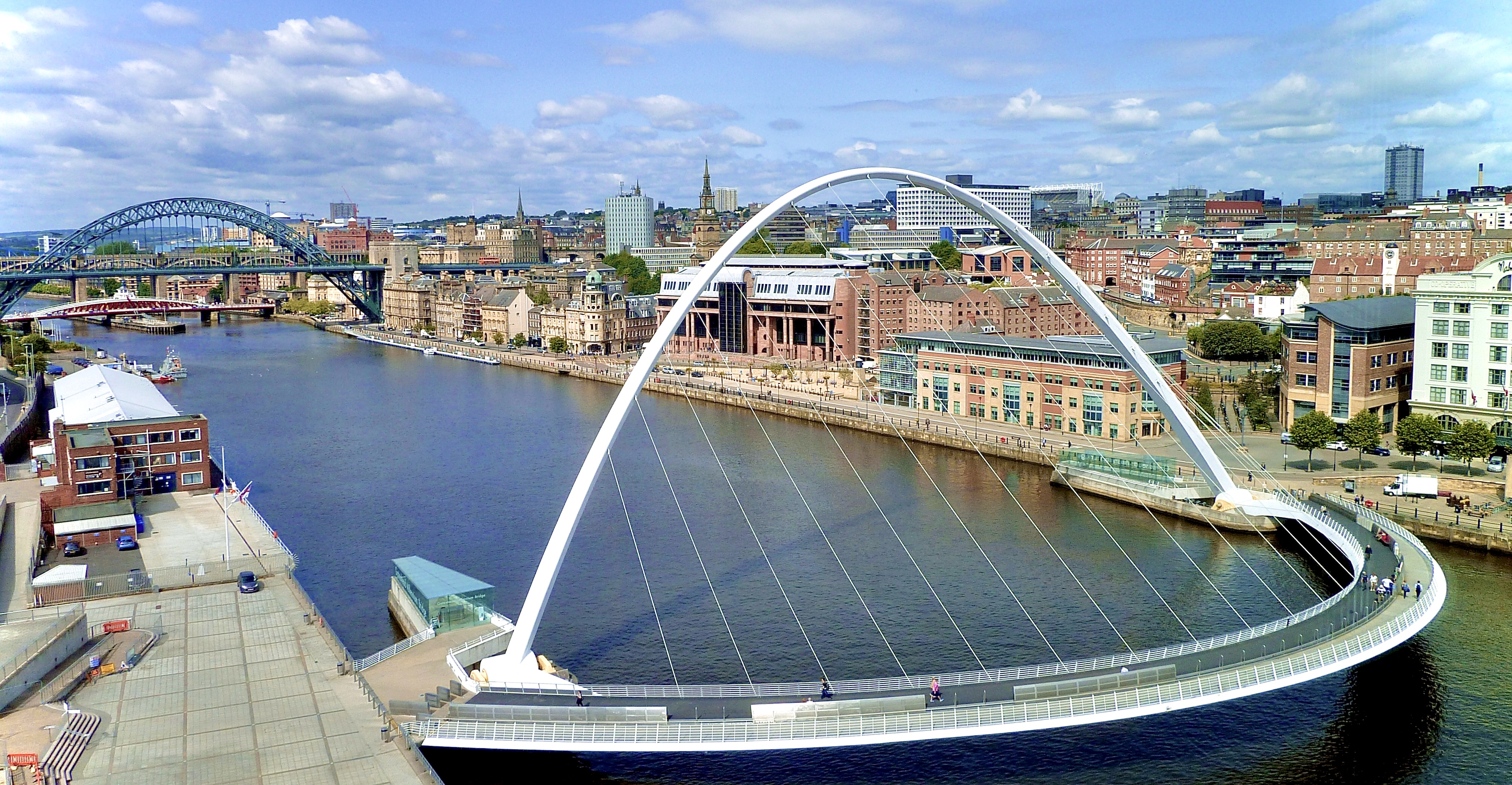
Gateshead Millennium Bridge, United Kingdom

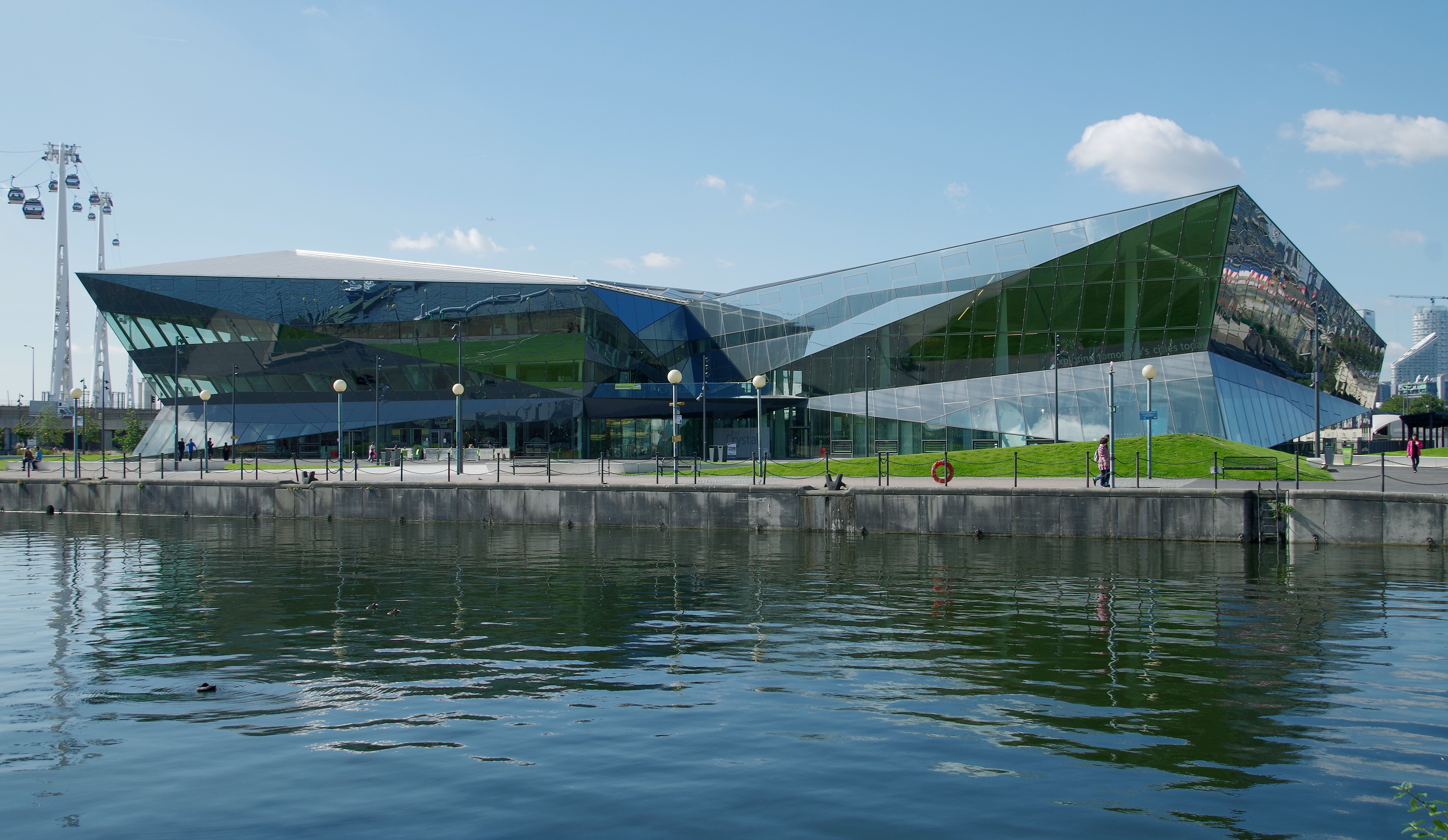
The Crystal, now London's City Hall in Newham, United Kingdom

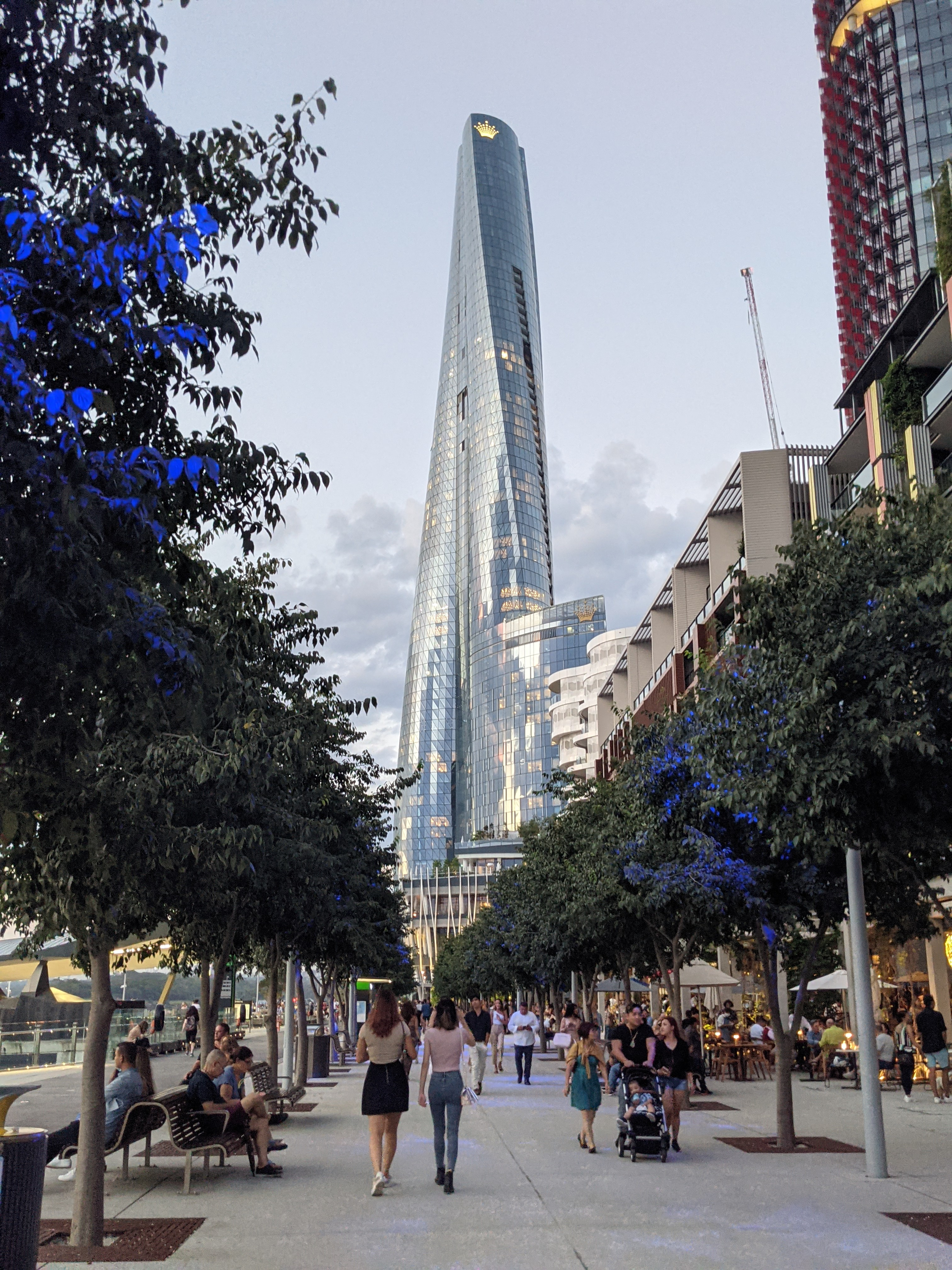
One Barangaroo, Crown Sydney, Sydney, Australia

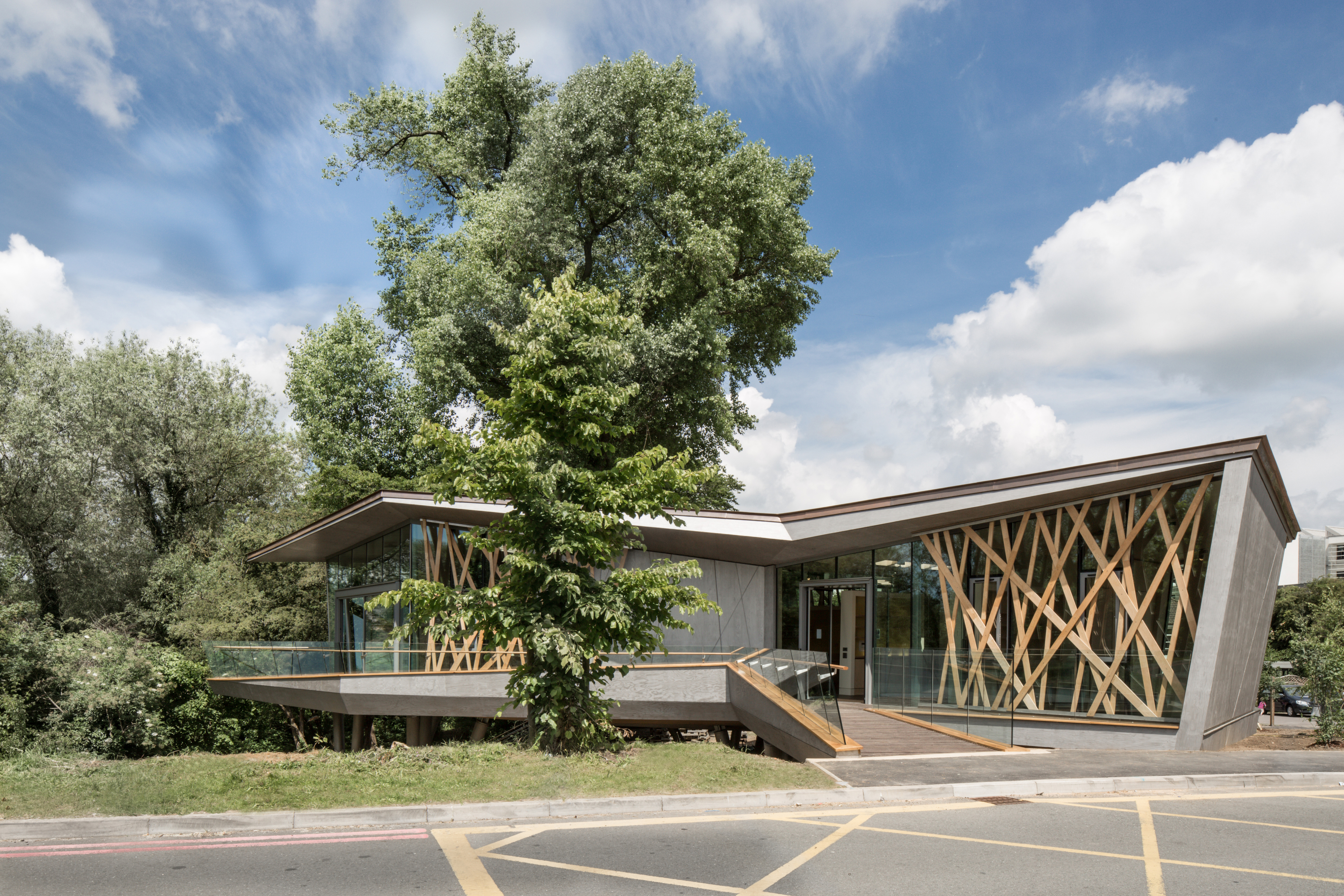
Maggie's Centre, Oxford, United Kingdom

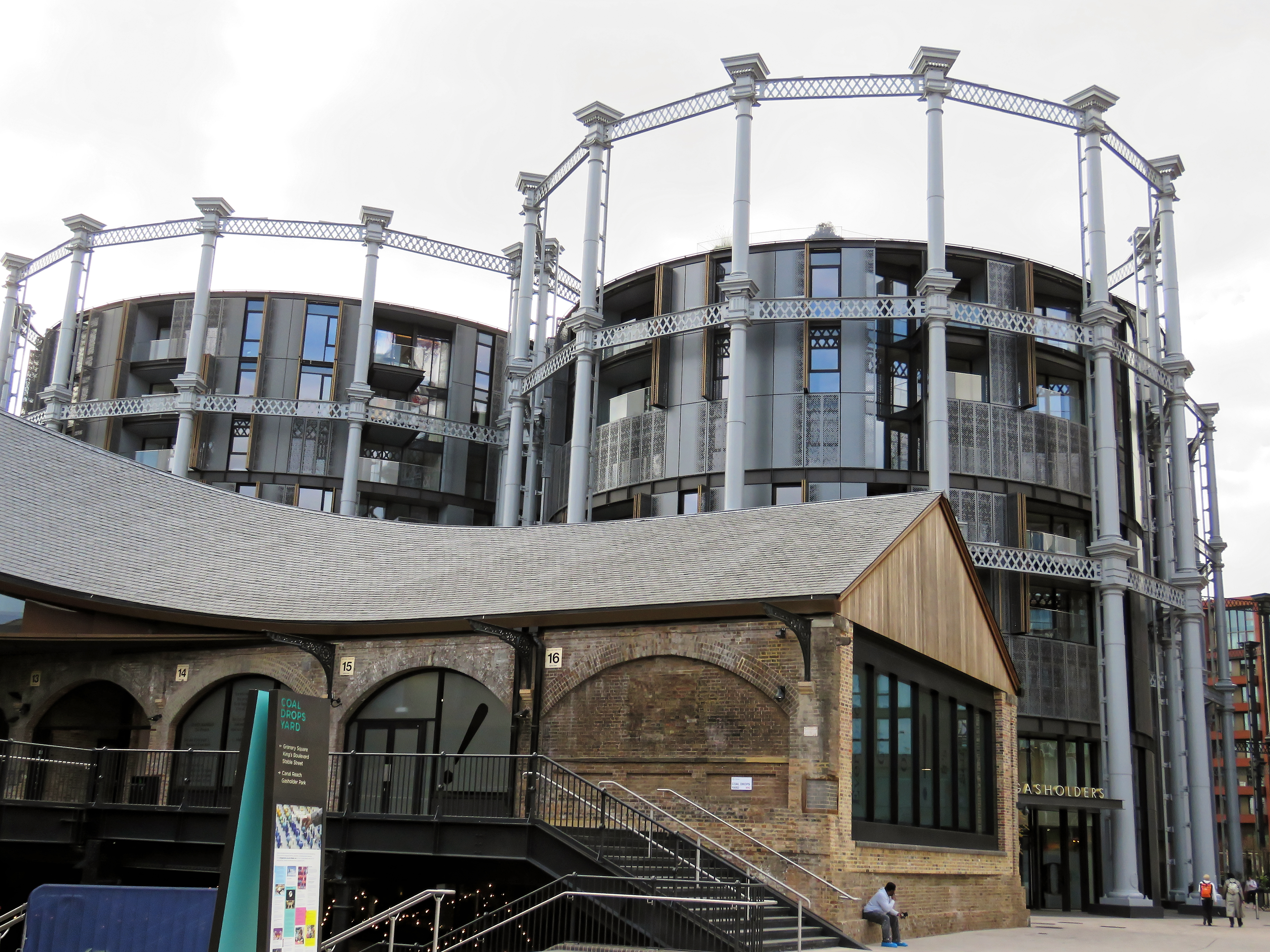
Kings Cross Gasholders, London, United Kingdom

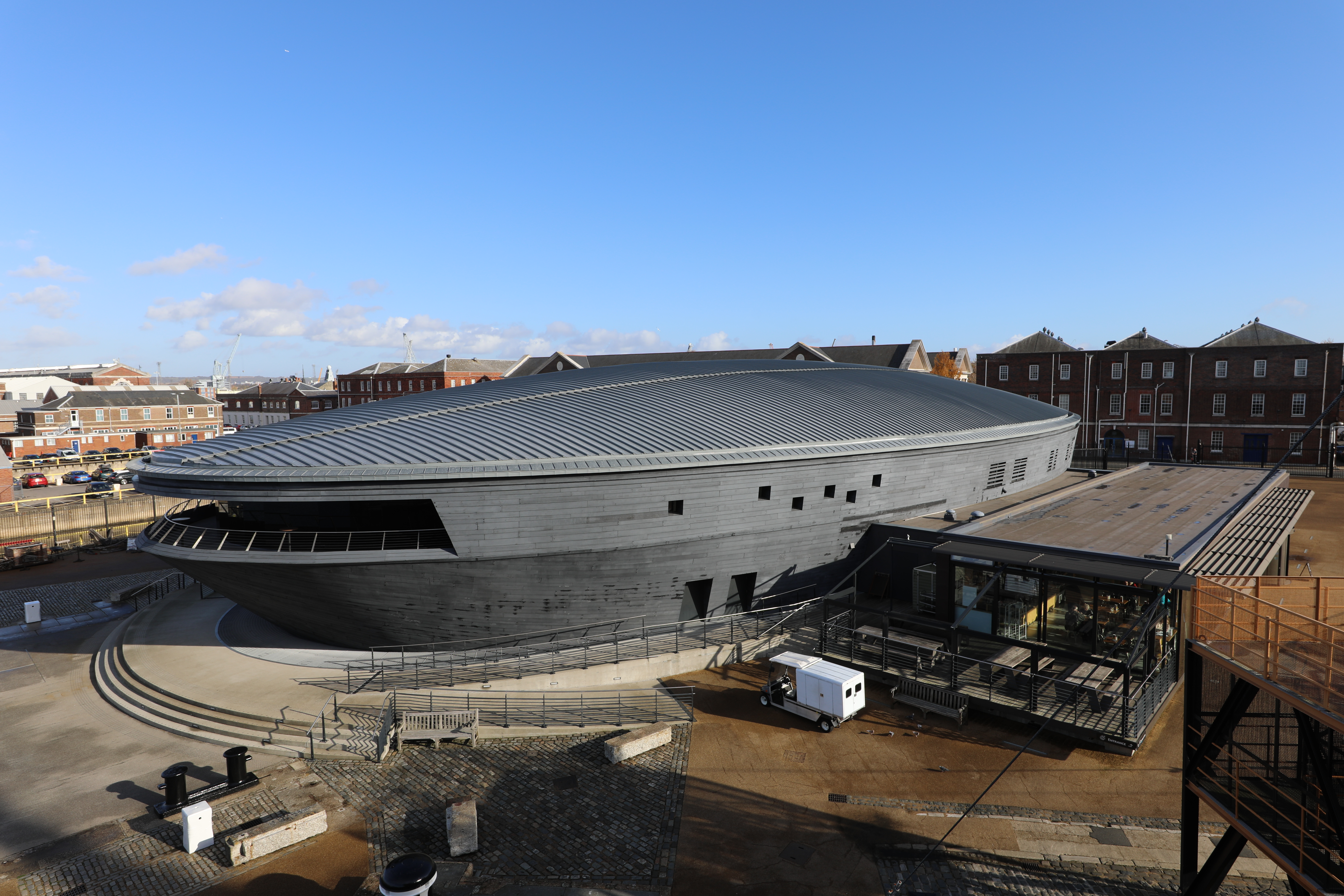
Mary Rose Museum, Portsmouth, United Kingdom

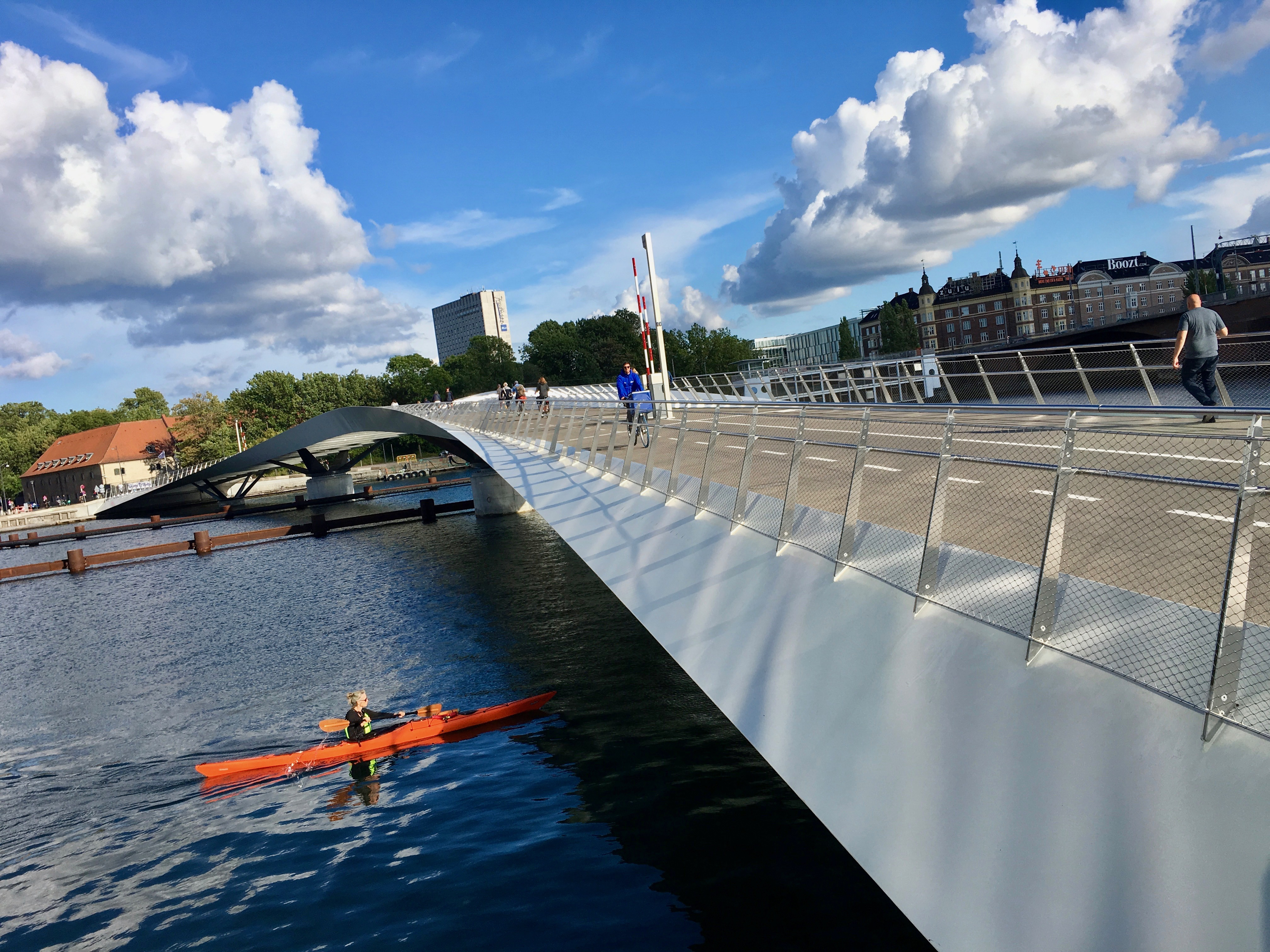
Lille Langebro, Copenhagen, Denmark

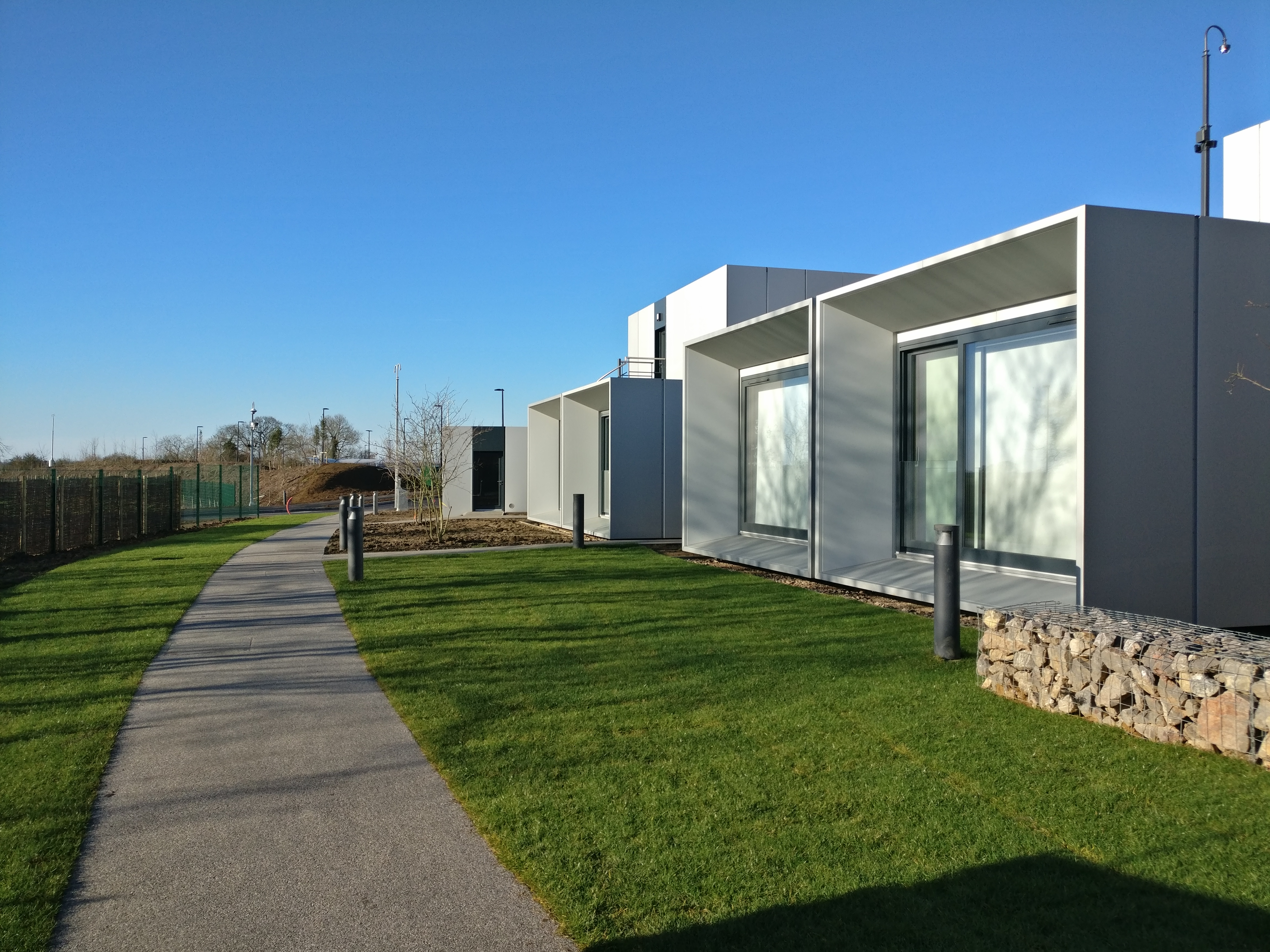
Dyson Institute Village, Malmesbury, United Kingdom

== Published works ==
- Wilkinson, Chris (1991). "Chapter 3: Industrial Architecture in the Early Twentieth Century". Supersheds: The Architecture of Long-Span, Large-Volume Buildings. Oxford: Butterworth Architecture. pp. 39–50. doi:10.1016/b978-0-7506-1221-0.50009-8. ISBN 0-7506-1221-5.
- Wilkinson, Chris (2009). Bridging Art and Science. London: Pidgeon Digital. OCLC 792974881. Audio book.
- Wilkinson, Chris (2015). Sketchbooks of Chris Wilkinson. London: Royal Academy of Arts. ISBN 978-1-910350-18-8. OCLC 951100091.
