= Pinnace (ship's boat) =

Watercraft

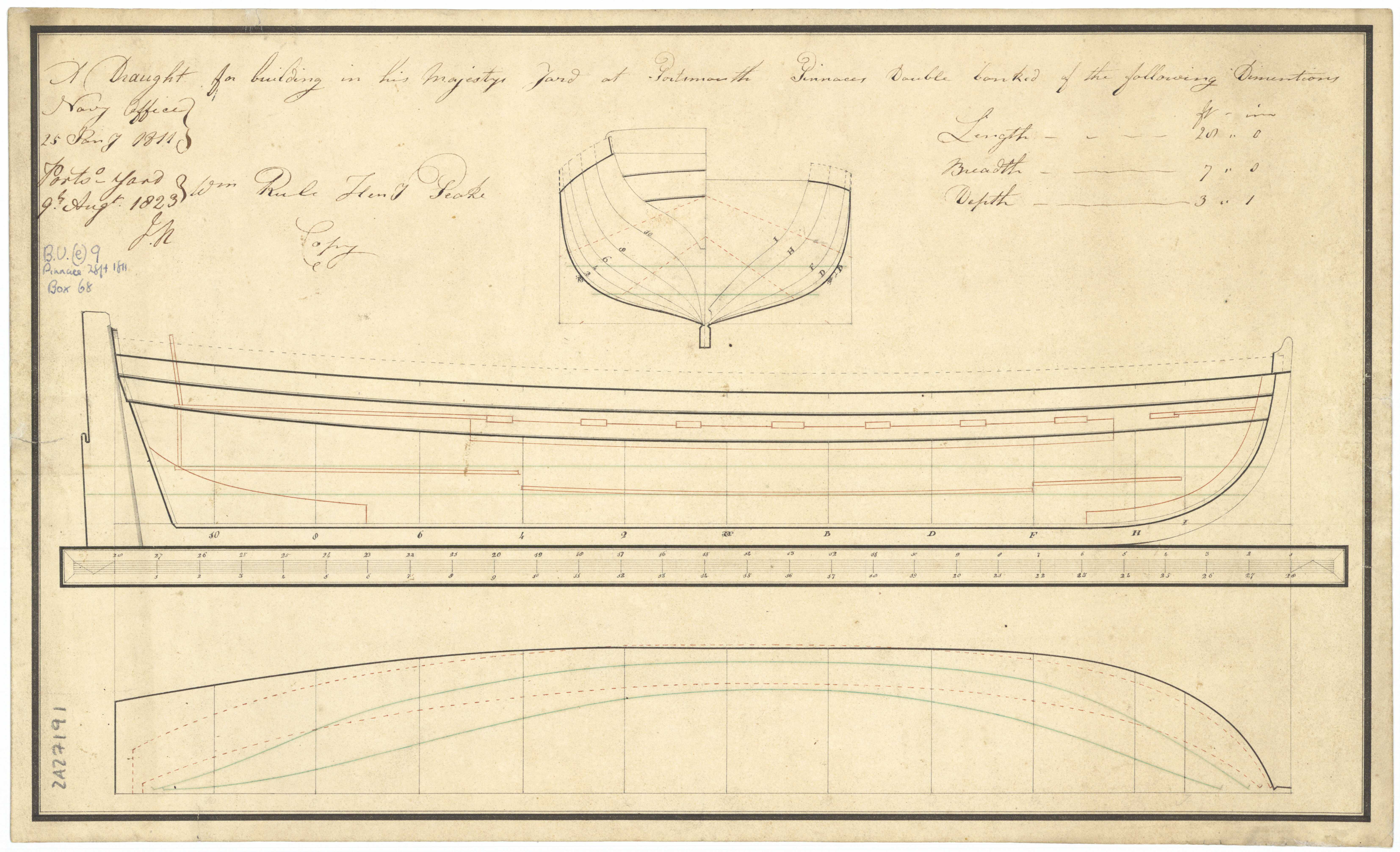
Plans of a 28ft Royal Navy pinnace

As a ship's boat, the pinnace is a light boat, propelled by oars or sails, carried aboard merchant and war vessels in the Age of Sail to serve as a tender. The pinnace was usually rowed but could be rigged with a sail for use in favorable winds. A pinnace would ferry passengers and mail, communicate between vessels, scout to sound anchorages, convey water and provisions, or carry armed sailors for boarding expeditions. The Spanish favored them as lightweight smuggling vessels while the Dutch used them as raiders. In modern parlance, "pinnace" has come to mean an auxiliary vessel that does not fit under the "launch" or "lifeboat" definitions.

== Etymology ==
The word pinnace, and similar words in many languages (as far afield as Malaysia, where the boat "pinas" took its name from the Malay pinas), came ultimately from the Spanish pinaza c. 1240, from pino (pine tree), from the wood of which the ships were constructed. The word came into English from the Middle French pinasse.

== Original designs ==
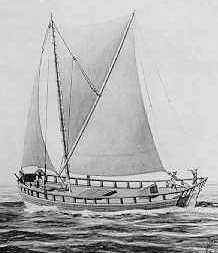
Drawing of a pinnace under full sail

Identification of some pinnaces in contemporary historical documents is often difficult because there was no standardization of pinnace design, be the type "small" or "large". The term seems to have been applied to variants of what may be called the full-rigged pinnace, rather than the alternative use of the term for a larger vessel's boat. Furthermore, several ship type and rig terms were used in the 17th century, but with very different definitions from those applied today.

Often decked over, the "small" pinnace was able to support a variety of rigs, each of which conferred maximum utility to specific missions such as fishing, cargo transport and storage, or open ocean voyaging. The mature "small" pinnace design emerged as versatile with several different options and rigs possible. The expected popularity of the pinnace in the Massachusetts Bay Colony during the first half of the 17th century is documented. By the 1630s, historical records mention many ships trading or fishing with the Massachusetts Bay Colony, some of which were also built in-colony. Above all, the fishing trade had taken hold off the shores of New England, and was immediately successful. The pinnace may have been the preferred, multi-use small ship of the first decades of English settlement in "Virginia".

== Steam pinnace ==
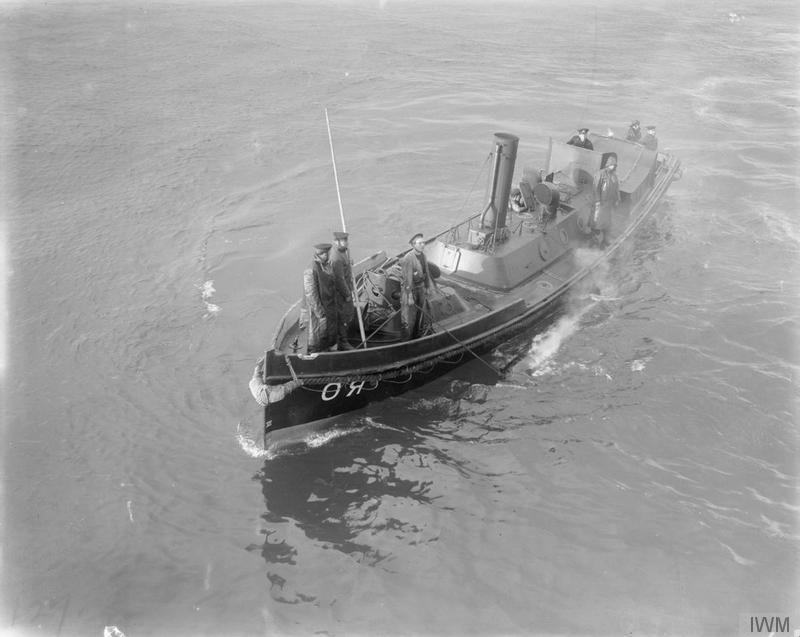
A steam pinnace from HMS Royal Oak

With the introduction of steam propulsion came the steam pinnace. Coal burning warships were particularly vulnerable when at anchor, immobile until they could get a head of steam. Steam pinnaces were designed to be small enough to be carried by the capital ships they were allocated to and in addition to other duties were armed to act as picket boats. The Royal Navy pinnace Steam Pinnace 199 is preserved at Portsmouth Historic Dockyard.

One example of a ship utilizing many steam pinnace (ship's boats) was HMS London in Zanzibar while suppressing the slave trade in the region:

Slavery was legal in all Muslim countries, and HM ships could only become involved with slaving when it took place on the high seas. The boats of HMS London were kept at five minutes' notice, ready equipped with water, salt pork, biscuits, arms, local currency and a small cask of rum. Manned by eight or nine sailors, with a midshipman or junior lieutenant in command, a boat was often away from the London for two or three weeks, normally anchoring every night, the men off watch sleeping along the thwarts.
