= Steam Pinnace 199 =

Royal Navy steam pinnace

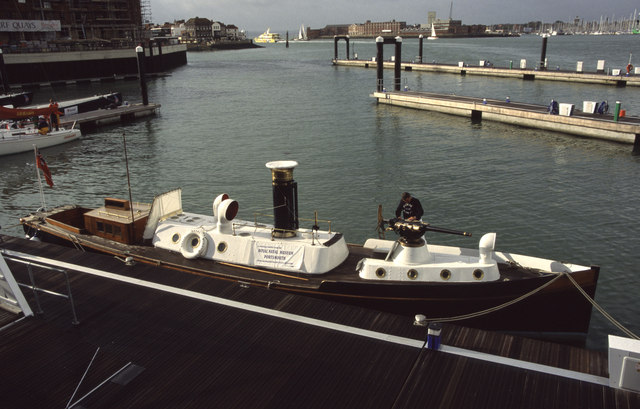
- Steam Pinnace 199 in 2001

History

United Kingdom
- Name: Steam Pinnace 224 (Note: During her restoration, she was misidentified as Steam Pinnace 199, which is now her name.)
- Builder: J. Reid, Portsmouth
- Laid down: 1909
- Out of service: 1948
- Fate: Purchased by the National Museum of the Royal Navy in 1979
- Status: Heritage ship

General characteristics
- Length: 50.00 ft (15.24 m)
- Beam: 9.09 ft (2.77 m)
- Speed: 12 knots (22 km/h)
- Armament: 1 x QF 3-pounder Hotchkiss

Steam Pinnace 199 is a steam pinnace of the Royal Navy, built in 1909 by J. Reid of Portsmouth. She is now owned by the National Museum of the Royal Navy, and is based at Portsmouth Historic Dockyard.

== History ==
During its restoration, the ship was misidentified and it became known as Steam Pinnace 199. However, it was later determined that the ship's machinery originated from pinnaces 208 and 224, and that its hull, stern cabin, and funnel also came from 224. Despite these findings, the name Steam Pinnace 199 was retained. Steam Pinnace 224 was built in 1909, and was assigned to the battlecruiser HMS Inflexible in 1916. It was sold out of the Royal Navy on 6 August 1948, and in 1952 she was sold to a private owner, renamed Treleague, and was converted into a houseboat located on the Thames. During this time its steam machinery was removed, and replaced by a petrol engine. After serving as a houseboat for about 20 years, she was purchased by an antiques dealer who intended to restore her. However, the project was deemed too expensive and its hull was sold to the National Museum of the Royal Navy in 1979.

== Restoration ==
She was restored by a group called the Steam Launch Restoration Group, based in Gosport. In 1983, she was given a boiler and compound engine from a similar steam pinnace, found at the Royal Navy shore establishment HMS Sultan. Her original steam auxiliary engines were found at a yard in Belgium. During her restoration, the ship was given a replacement Hotchkiss 3-pounder gun dating from 1887, and salvaged from the sea by a trawler in 1980. The gun has been restored cosmetically; however, it is not functional and the inside of the barrel is corroded. The ship was finally recommissioned in 1984, and was kept in the Mast Pond of Portsmouth Historic Dockyard until 1998, when she was brought to Gosport for a refit. From 1999 to 2001 her machinery was given a major refurbishment. Since then, she has taken place in many events such as the International Festival of the Sea, the Yarmouth Old Gaffers Festival and the Southampton Boat Show. In May 2011, she developed leaks in her boiler tubes and was transported to the Maritime Workshop in February 2012. She was given a refit, and she was relaunched in 2015. Steam Pinnace 199 is preserved afloat in Boathouse 4 at Portsmouth Historic Dockyard.
