= Alison Sim =

English historian of the Tudor period

Alison Sim (born 1961) is an English freelance historian and author, specialising in the Tudor period.

== Biography ==
Sim was born in 1961.

Sims lectures on Tudor food for the Mary Rose Trust and has worked as a guide at the Tower of London and Hampton Court Palace. She has also featured on podcasts focusing on the Tudor period.

Sims has also published several books on the Tudor period. Her book Pleasures & Pastimes in Tudor England (1999) explored the ideal for the Tudor sportsman or gentlewoman, pastimes such as dancing, fashion, music, the theatre and reading, and how leisure was shaped by religious calendar customs. Her book The Tudor Housewife focused on marriage, childbirth, breastfeeding and the upbringing of children as well as how women were expected to manage businesses and household accounts in the period.

Sim has written articles for magazines such as History Today.

== Selected publications ==
- Food & Feast in Tudor England (1997)
- The Tudor Housewife (1998)
- Pleasures & Pastimes in Tudor England (1999)
- Masters and Servants in Tudor England (2006)
