= Historic Dockyard =

Historic Dockyard may refer to:

- Portsmouth Historic Dockyard, a maritime museum in Hampshire, England
- Chatham Historic Dockyard, a maritime museum in Kent, England
