= Dyson Institute Village =

Modular student housing pods

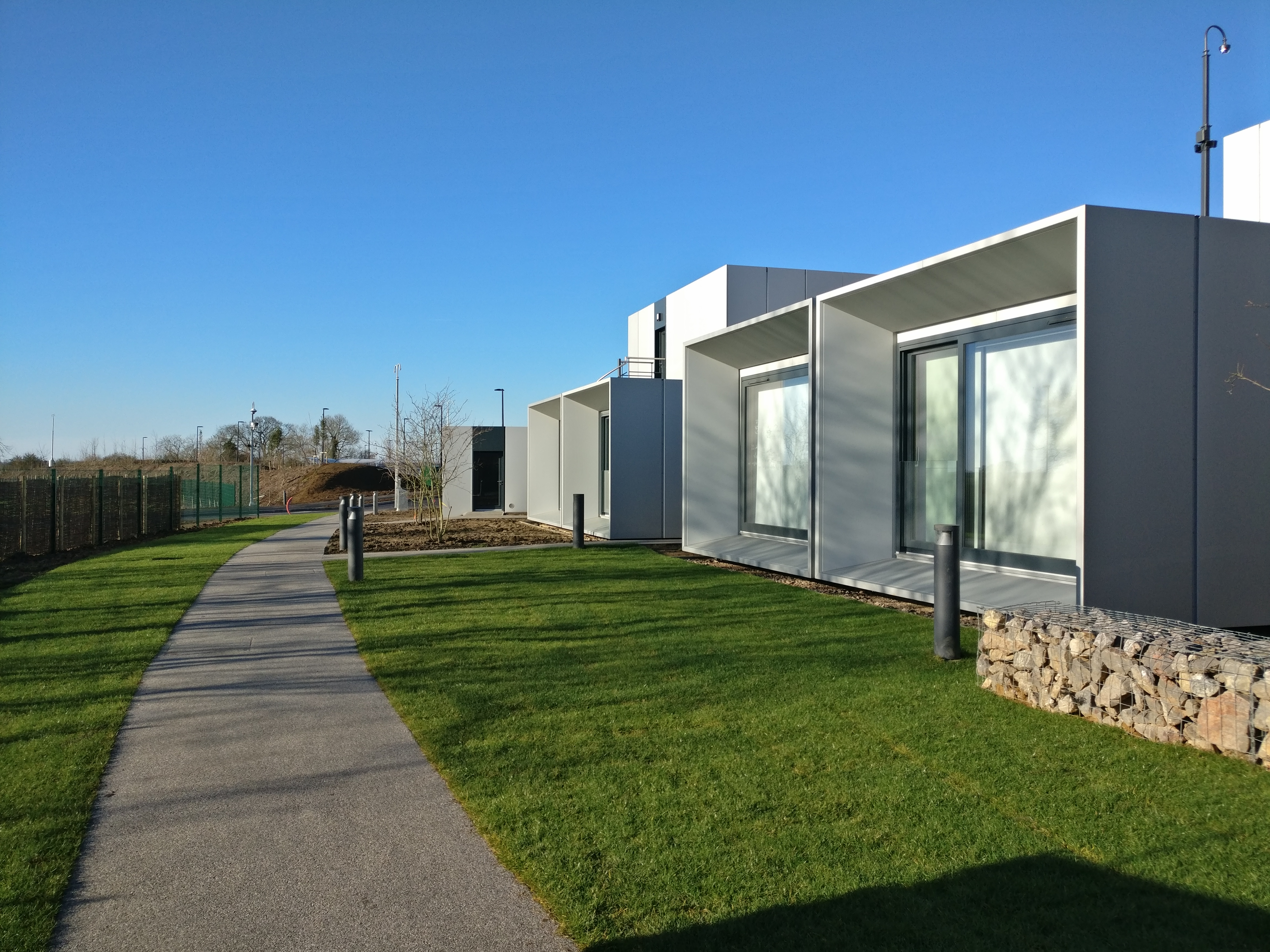
- Dyson Village student pods
- Interactive map of the Dyson Institute Village area
- Former names: Dyson Institute modular student housing pods

General information
- Status: Completed
- Type: Housing
- Architectural style: Modular buildings
- Location: England, Tetbury Hill, Malmesbury SN16 0RP, United Kingdom
- Coordinates: 51.5975°N 2.1075°W
- Current tenants: Student housing
- Construction started: January 2018
- Completed: May 2019
- Client: Dyson Institute of Engineering and Technology
- Owner: Dyson Institute

Technical details
- Structural system: Stacked pods
- Material: cross-laminated timber, wood and aluminium
- Floor area: 26m² (per individual pod); 1,612m² (for all pods)

Design and construction
- Architect: Chris Wilkinson
- Structural engineer: Buro Happold (roundhouse); Carbon Dynamic with Design Engineering Workshop (pods)

Website
- Dyson

Dyson Institute Village was built in 2019 on the outskirts of Malmesbury, Wiltshire, England, to provide on-campus student housing for the Dyson Institute of Engineering and Technology. The village was designed as a number of stacked studio apartment modules by London architects WilkinsonEyre, and modelled after Montreal's Habitat 67. The pods are constructed from cross-laminated timber (CLT) and each pod is wrapped in aluminium. A feature of the modular system is that each pod is connected to the others with only four bolts.

== Design ==
The pods which make up the village were designed for fast construction. Each pod was made from cross-laminated timber, and they were prefabricated. The outside of each pod is wrapped in aluminium. The units were manufactured in Scotland complete with furniture and electrical fittings, and then delivered to Hullavington Airfield (a nearby Dyson site) to be completed.

Originally WilkinsonEyre's director said they wanted to paint the structure, but James Dyson preferred wood interiors. The pods were inspired by the Habitat 67 housing development designed in Montreal, Canada, by Moshe Safdie. The developers hoped to inspire a feeling of community with the arrangement of the village. Visually the pods appear to be a combination of retro and future.

Each pod has a large front window facing the communal building called the Roundhouse, which has a cafe, a screening room and a gathering area. The pods are arranged in a semi-circle facing it. The architects stated that the Roundhouse was meant to be the central "social and education hub" of the campus. The pods were designed to be sustainable and healthy, with proper ventilation.

== Engineering ==
The 63 pods have no steel structural support and are arranged two and three high. Several of the stacks feature a pod which is cantilevered out 3 metres (9.8 ft). Each pod measures 8 by 4 metres (26 ft × 13 ft). Every six pods share a kitchen, a laundry area and a storage area.

Structural engineering of the pods and their interconnections was by Glasgow-based Design Engineering Workshop. The cross-laminated timber presented a challenge because of the natural differences in wood stiffness. Orthotropic plates were utilized to cross the timber in three directions for structural stability. Only four bolts connect each pod to the others. The four bolts can be installed by one worker in ten minutes.

== See also ==
- Brutalism
- Metabolism (architecture)
- Structuralism (architecture)
