= Mary Rose Museum =

Coordinates: 50.8022°N 1.1090°W

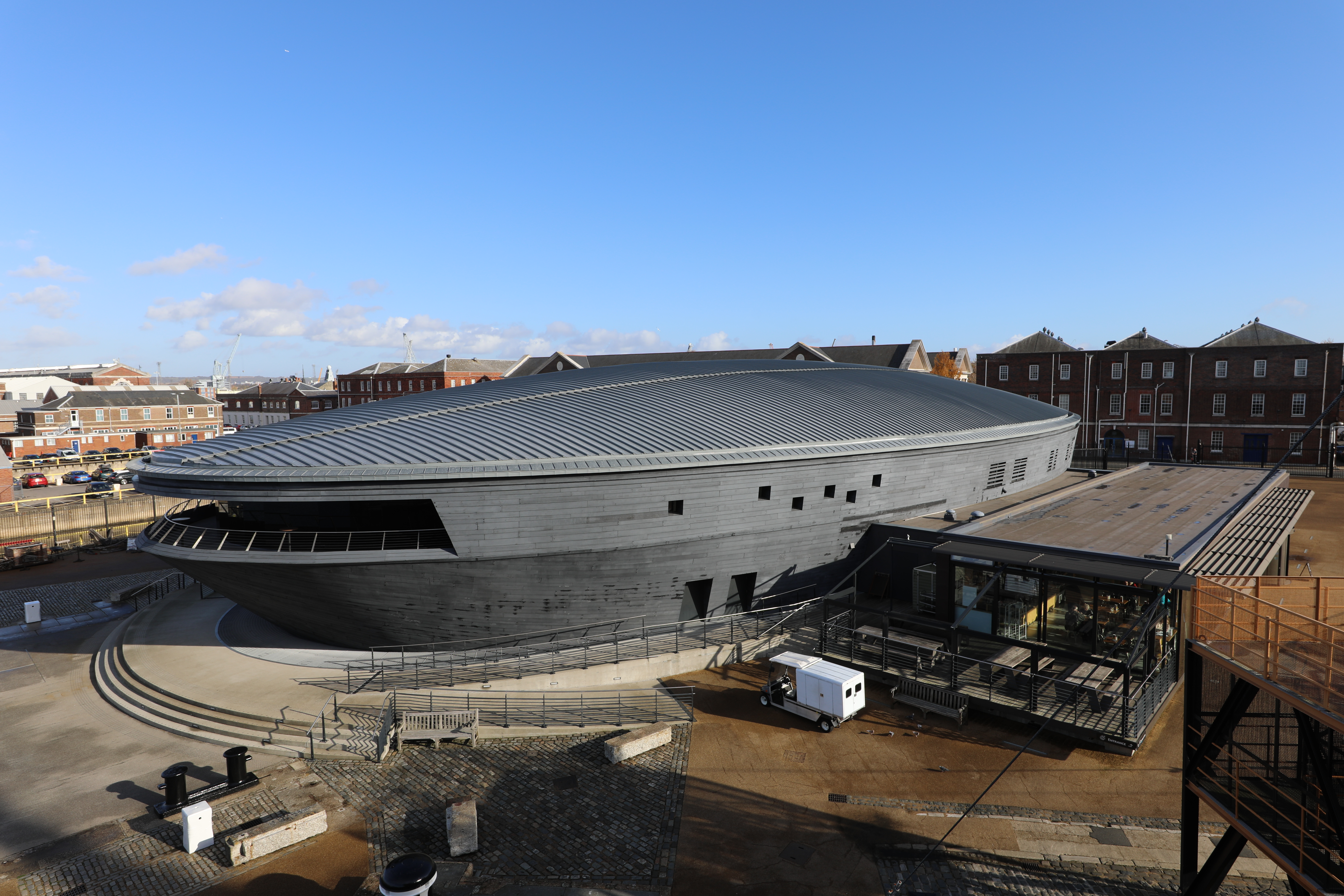
- The New Mary Rose Museum in 2018
- Established: 1984
- Location: Portsmouth, United Kingdom
- Type: Maritime museum
- Key holdings: Mary Rose warship
- Collection size: 19,000 artefacts
- Visitors: 364,295 (2017)
- Owner: Mary Rose Trust
- Website: www.maryrose.org

The Mary Rose Museum houses the Tudor warship Mary Rose. It is part of the Historic Dockyards in Portsmouth in the United Kingdom, and is run by the Mary Rose Trust.

== Overview ==
The museum is dedicated to the 16th-century Tudor navy warship Mary Rose as well as the historical context in which she was active. The museum opened in 1984 and displays artefacts recovered from the ship, as well as the vessel itself, in a dedicated ship hall. Since opening it has been visited by over a million people.

== History ==
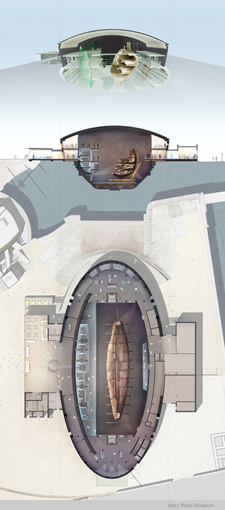
Concept plan of the new Mary Rose Museum by WilkinsonEyre

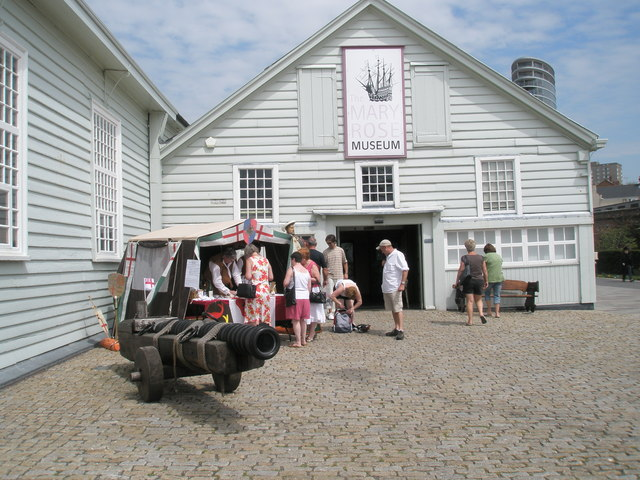
The old museum entrance seen in July 2008

In September 2009 the ship hall was closed for the final time. In December 2009, demolition of the ship hall began. to allow the start of construction of a new museum that was opened at the end of May 2013. The Mary Rose Museum (2013) was designed by architects WilkinsonEyre, Perkins+Will and built by construction firm Warings. The construction was challenging because the museum was built over the ship in the dry dock, which is a listed monument. During construction of the museum, conservation of the hull continued inside a sealed "hotbox". In April 2013, the polyethylene glycol sprays were turned off and the process of controlled air drying began. In 2016 the "hotbox" walls were removed and after reopening the ship was on display behind glass. In 2016, the museum was closed for 9 months whilst a £5.4 million redevelopment was undertaken, allowing visitors to view the ship without being separated from it by a glass wall.
