= Fantom Technologies =

Former Canadian household appliance company

Fantom Technologies, Inc.
- Formerly: IONA Appliances
- Company type: Privately held company
- Industry: Household appliances
- Founded: 1986; 40 years ago (as IONA Appliances); 1995; 31 years ago (as Fantom Technologies)
- Defunct: 2001; 25 years ago
- Fate: Bankruptcy
- Headquarters: Welland, Ontario, Canada
- Products: Vacuum cleaners

Fantom Technologies was a Canadian household appliance company that manufactured dual-cyclonic type vacuum cleaners, they were inspired from the Dyson vacuums (which would not appear in North America until 2002). The company was founded in Welland, Ontario in 1986 as IONA Appliances, with offices in Buffalo, New York, United States. Its Fantom Technologies name was adopted in 1995.

Fantom went bankrupt in October 2001 and their vacuums have been considered collector's items since.

== History ==
=== Foundation and development ===
In 1989, British-born James Dyson (inventor of dual-cyclone vacuums) and Canada's IONA Appliances (the predecessor of Fantom Technologies) made a licensing deal in which the company would manufacture and sell a line of commercial dual-cyclonic upright vacuums called Vectron, for SC Johnson Wax, on which Dyson held the patent. Two years later, SC Johnson exited the commercial vacuum business and IONA renamed the vacuums to "Fantom". IONA also licensed a deal with Sears to sell the Fantom under the name "Kenmore Destiny." 1993 brought a successful infomercial for the original Fantom vacuum. One year later, the vacuum offered a HEPA filter as an option. In 1996, the vacuum was renamed the Fantom Thunder (AKA Kenmore Destiny Plus).

=== Bankruptcy ===
In October 2001, Fantom Technologies went bankrupt, and the name was sold to Euro-Pro (owned by Mark Rosenzweig). James Dyson saw an opportunity and introduced a multi-cyclonic vacuum under the Dyson name in North America in 2002, called the DC07, one year after Fantom went out of business. The Dyson DC07, as well as later Dyson models, would be commercial best-sellers in North America. Today, Fantom vacuums are considered collector's items.

== Later models ==
- Fantom Fury – In 1996, the company introduced the Fantom Fury. The vacuum was smaller than the Thunder unit and was lighter and less expensive. Again, it achieved success through a television infomercial. It was less able to clean carpets due to a weaker motor. Also sold at Sears as "Kenmore Destiny II."
- Fantom Lightning – Fantom Technologies offered a canister-style vacuum in 1998 called the Fantom Lightning. It was sold at a price of $329 through a television infomercial hosted by Jim Caldwell (and produced by his then-business Future Thunder Productions). Again, it sold well, but the vacuum had defects including a like poor handle release on the power nozzle and poor wand and hose design. Also sold at Sears as "Kenmore Destiny 3000."
- Fantom Cyclone XT – A later model was the Fantom Cyclone XT, released in 1999. Sold again through an infomercial hosted by Cheryl Watson and Jim Caldwell, the vacuum was engineered similar to the Lightning, but as upright. It was successful. A single cyclone model was released after the partnership with Dyson ended in 2001. Also sold as the "Westinghouse Wired."
- Fantom Crosswinds – James Dyson ended his partnership with Fantom Technologies in early 2001. That same year, Fantom released two single-cyclone vacuums called the Fantom Crosswinds, which unlike the previous vacuums, was a failure due clogging problems. They released two models. The Fantom Crosswind 200 XL, based on the Fantom Fury, and the Fantom Crosswind 600 XL, based on the Cyclone XT.
- Fantom Wildcat – The Wildcat was a vacuum cleaner which was equivalent to the Westinghouse Unplugged.
