= 10 Brock Street =

Office building in London

- Regent's Place
- Interactive map of the 10 Brock Street area

General information
- Architectural style: Contemporary
- Location: 338 Euston Road, London, England
- Coordinates: 51.525556°N 0.139444°W
- Groundbreaking: 2010
- Completed: 2013
- Cost: £116 million
- Owner: British Land
- Management: M3 Consulting

Height
- Height: 238.32 feet (72.64 m)

Technical details
- Material: Glass and steel
- Floor count: 16
- Floor area: 49,000m²

Design and construction
- Architect: WilkinsonEyre
- Engineer: CH2M
- Structural engineer: Facade: Arup
- Other designers: Lighting design Maurice Brill
- Main contractor: Lendlease
- Awards and prizes: 2014, Best Built: London Planning Award
- Designations: BREEAM

Website
- WilkinsonEyre

10 Brock Street is a contemporary sixteen story office building designed by WilkinsonEyre and in London, England, The building is part of a development called Regent's Place which is made up of eight buildings. The development was commissioned by British Land. The unique visual elements include geometric angled planes, luminescent facades and angled roofline.

== Design ==
The building has three different sections which produce three different roof lines. Each section appears to be a separate building. together and separate they take on a crystalline appearance. It is a 3 core design which s referred to as in the style of Renzo Piano.

The office building s part of the Regent's Place development, which is a 13-acre site for the British Land company. The site includes retail, and residential in a total of eight buildings. There are 20,000 people who either work or live at the site. The original commission in 2003 called for three buildings of staggered height, but the 2008 financial crisis caused the construction plans to change. 10 Brock Street became a single building with a larger footprint. Initial tenants included Debenhams, Facebook and Manchester City Football Club.

=== Materials ===
The building materials which were used in the facade include: aluminum mesh, 80 different glass types and luminescent steel panels. The components of the facade make the building more energy efficient. Instead of an all-glass facade, 20% of the building's south side is insulated. On the east and west outer glass facades there is fritting in the glass. The fritting consists of dots which are baked the glass with paint. Inside the glass there is also fritting. Inside facing fritting has a silver color and facing out is a dark blue: these different fritting shades create a 3 dimensional appearance to the glass. The fritting also is a factor in sun-shading. There are long vertical sun shading fins that also assist in the sun-shading. The energy saving measures incorporated in the design have earned the building an BREEAM - excellent (Building Research Establishment Environmental Assessment Method) rating.
