= Dyson Institute of Engineering and Technology =

Private institution of higher education in Wiltshire, England

Coordinates: 51.5952°N 2.1055°W

The Dyson Institute of Engineering and Technology is a private institution of higher education in England, founded in 2017 by James Dyson and based at the Dyson technology campus in Malmesbury, Wiltshire. Students work in a position in Dyson for three days a week, receive a salary, and have their tuition fees paid during their four-year course.

== Origins and architecture ==
James Dyson had been outspoken about an engineering skills shortage and training for engineers in the United Kingdom. In November 2016, he announced the planned launch of the Dyson Institute.

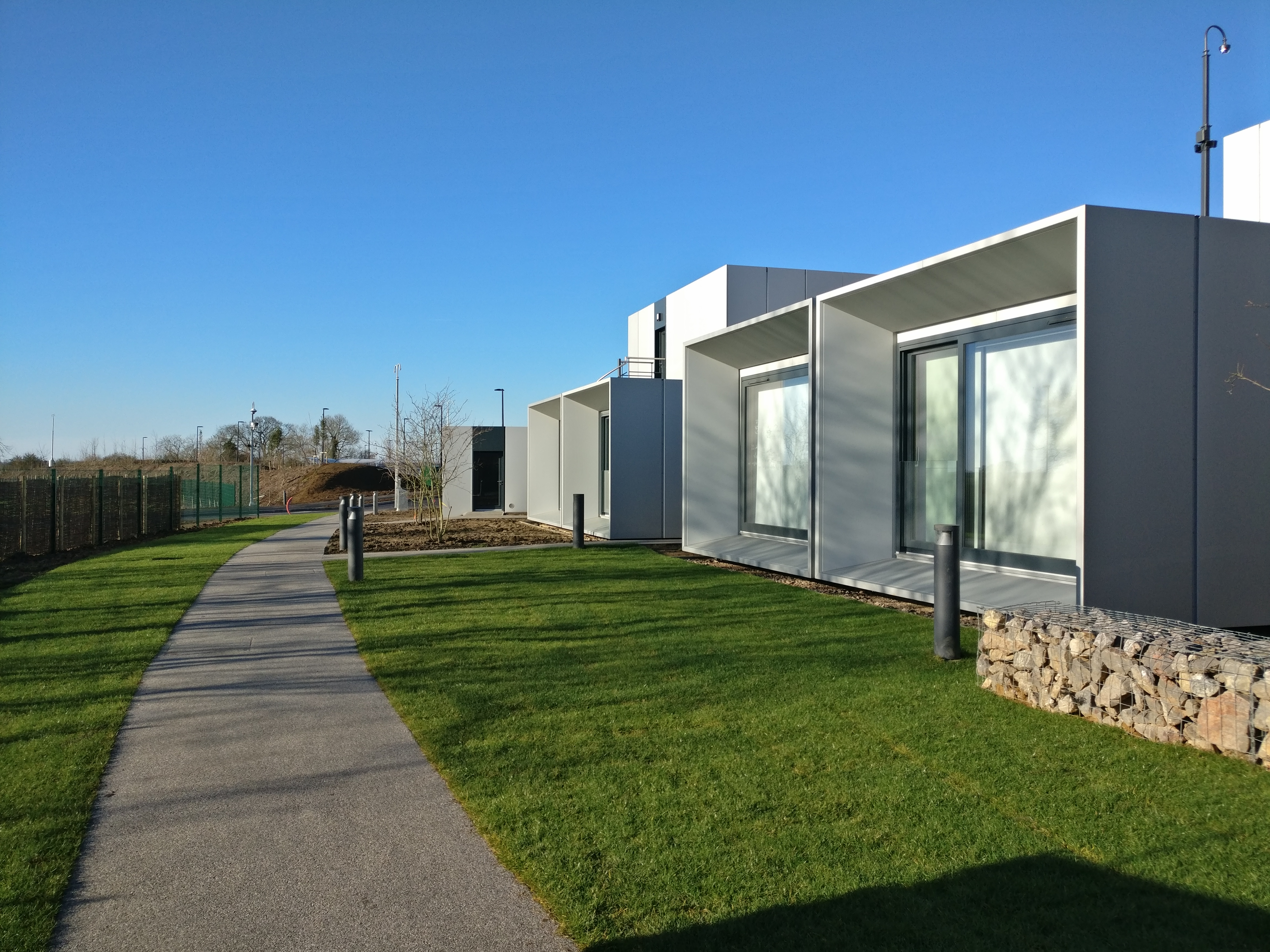
Accommodation pods at the Dyson Institute Village

As part of the development of the Institute, accommodation and communal spaces for undergraduates were designed and built in collaboration with Wilkinson Eyre. Completed in 2019, the village consists of pre-fabricated cross-laminate timber pods, arranged in clusters around a central communal building which houses a cafe, bar, and screening room. The Dyson Institute Village was entered into the residential category of the 2019 World Architecture News awards, and the housing project of the year category of the 2019 World Architecture Festival awards.

== Intake and courses ==
The Dyson Institute offered a single degree (Bachelor of Engineering) to the first, second and third cohorts, starting in September 2017, September 2018 and September 2019 respectively. The first two years of the four-year program were to cover the fundamentals of engineering, then specialized electronics and mechanical engineering courses would follow in the final two years.

The entry requirements for 2017 included AAB grades at A-level including an A in Mathematics and in another science or technology subject. Fourth-year students might be eligible to spend time at Dyson facilities in Malaysia or Singapore.

Student intake in September 2018 was 43, and by 2020 there were 150 undergraduates.

Originally, degrees were awarded in partnership with the University of Warwick, and lectures were given by professors from Warwick as well as Dyson engineers. The Institute was granted the power to award degrees in 2021.
