= James Dyson (schoolmaster) =

English schoolmaster (1875–1965)

James William Dyson (29 June 1875 – 6 March 1965) was an English schoolmaster whose subject was maths. After teaching at schools in Faversham and Wellingborough, for most of his career he was head of Boston Grammar School and Ripon Grammar School.

== Early life ==
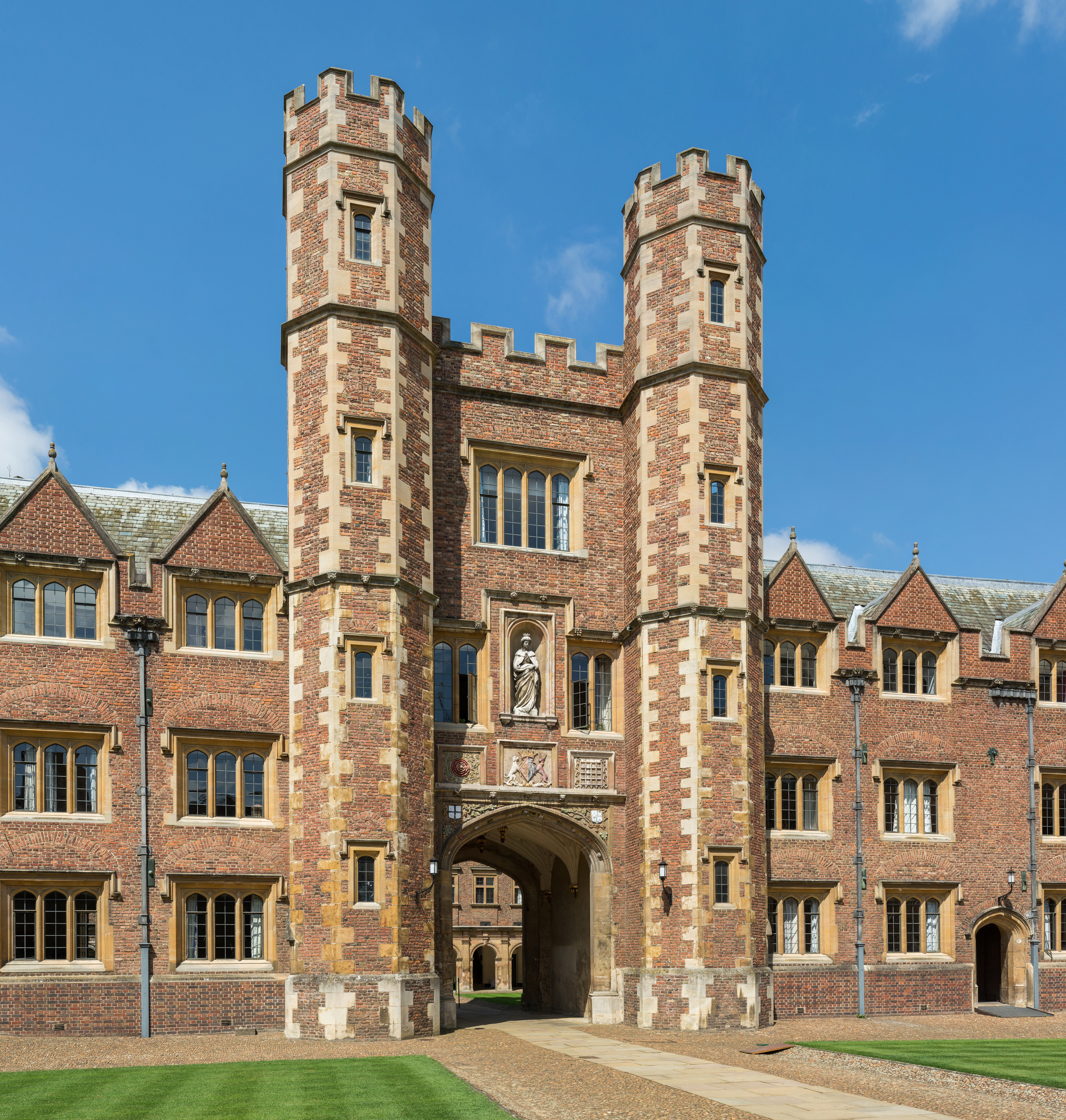
St John's College, Cambridge

Born at Wellingborough, Dyson was the eldest son of James Greaves Dyson, a corn merchants’ agent, of Wellingborough, originally from Ambleside, Westmorland. The young Dyson was educated at Wellingborough Grammar School under the headship of Dr H. E. Platt. In the Cambridge schools examinations of December 1891, he gained distinctions in mathematics and applied mathematics. In June 1894 he was admitted as a sizar to St John's College, Cambridge, which was the old college of his headmaster, Dr Platt, and matriculated in the Michaelmas term of that year. His room at St John's, H2 in First Court, had previously been occupied by Charles Stewart Middlemiss. Dyson graduated BA in 1897 and proceeded to MA by seniority in 1902.

Dyson had three younger brothers, Harry, Arthur, and George, and two younger sisters, Elizabeth and Gertrude. By 1891 their father was a corn merchant on his own account.

== Career ==
Dyson began his teaching career in the Michaelmas term of 1897, weeks after graduating at Cambridge, with an appointment as an assistant schoolmaster at Faversham Grammar School, and remained there for four years. In 1901 he took a job at his old school in Wellingborough and rose there to be a house master and the senior maths master. In 1912, he gained his first headship, at Boston Grammar School, and in 1919 was appointed as headmaster of Ripon Grammar School. He made it a condition of accepting the job at Ripon that the school governors would agree to abolish cubicles in the boarding house. He remained in post until 1935, when he retired.

Jack Gibson, one of Dyson's staff at Ripon in the 1930s, later reported

Dyson had gathered an exceptionally genial and skilled group of people, who worked hard, and getting the best out of the teachers and workers was possible due to his readiness to discuss problems and help wherever necessary.

== Personal life ==
In 1903, Dyson married Ethel Johnson, a native of Cambridge. A son, Alec William, was born in Boston in 1913. In 1939, the couple was living in retirement at Thriplow, near Cambridge, with their son, also a schoolmaster. In 1940, at Cambridge, Alec Dyson married Janet M. Bolton, daughter of the Vicar of Fowlmere, a short distance from Thriplow, and they were the parents of the inventor and businessman James Dyson, born at Cromer in 1947, and two other children.

J. W. Dyson and his wife moved to Colne Place, Cromer, to be near their son's family in Holt, Norfolk. Their son died of cancer in May 1956, and Ethel Dyson died in August 1959. J. W. Dyson followed in 1965, in his ninetieth year.
