= Mary Rose Trust =

Portsmouth base historical charitable trust

- Organisation logo
- Formation: 1979
- Type: Limited charitable trust
- Legal status: Active
- Purpose: Preserve, display and spread knowledge about the Mary Rose
- Location: Portsmouth, England
- Official language: English
- Website: The Mary Rose

The Mary Rose Trust is a limited charitable trust based in Portsmouth in the United Kingdom. Its primary aims are to preserve, display and spread knowledge about the 16th century warship Mary Rose which sank in the Solent on 19 July 1545 and was salvaged by the Trust in October 1982.

The Mary Rose Trust runs the Mary Rose Museum in Portsmouth Historic Dockyard.

== History ==
The Mary Rose Trust traces its origins back to the Mary Rose Committee, founded in 1968 with the intent "to find, excavate, raise and preserve for all time such remains of the ship Mary Rose as may be of historical or archaeological interest". The wrecksite was scouted and surveyed with side scan sonar in 1967-68, revealing a hidden feature, the first loose timber was located in 1970 and the buried wreck of the Mary Rose finally located on 5 May 1971. Throughout the 1970s volunteer divers and archaeologists surveyed the ship and conducted some limited excavations.

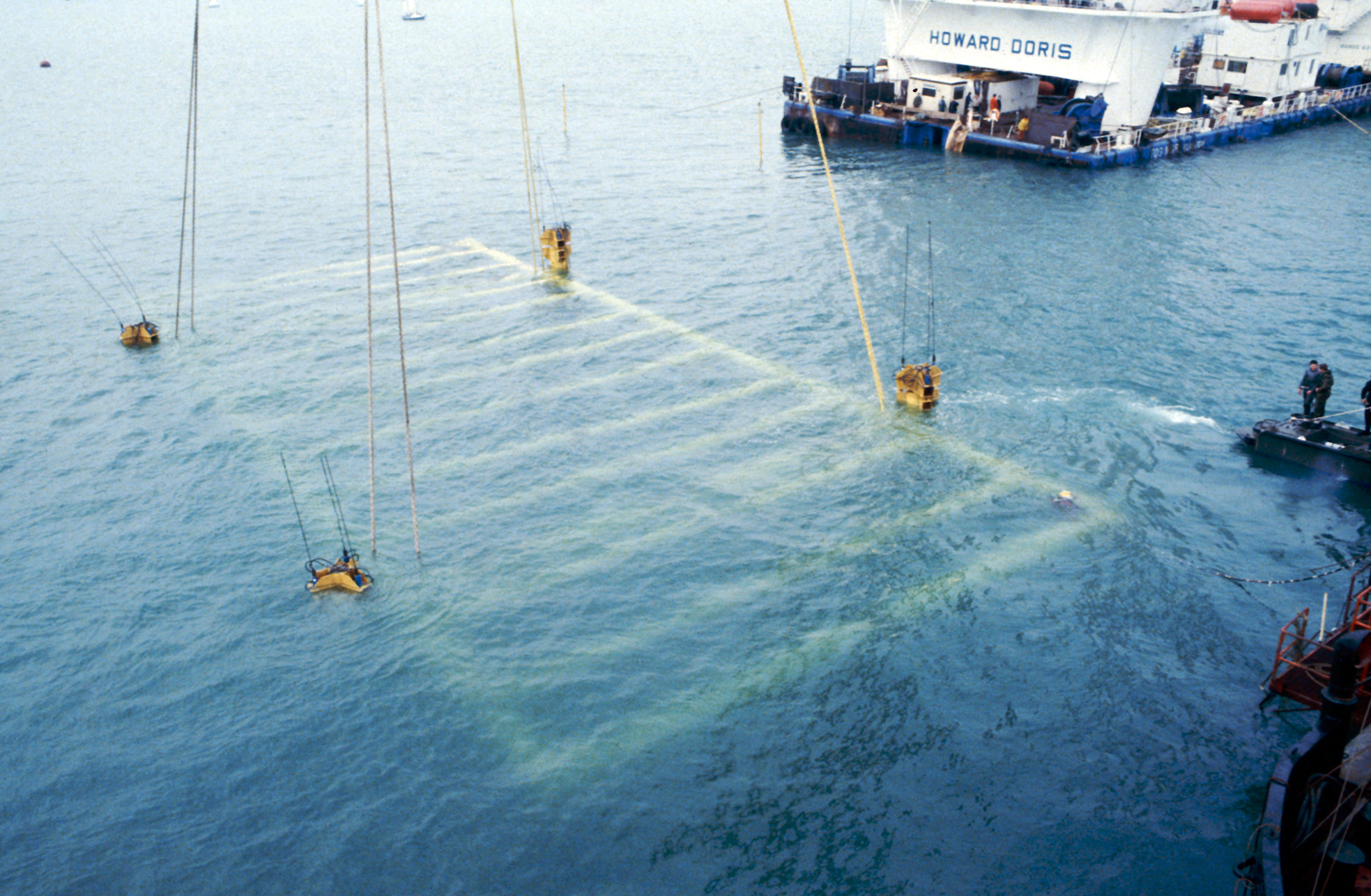
The final stages of the salvage of the Mary Rose on 11 October 1982. The lifting frame holding the wreck of the Mary Rose can be seen just below the surface of the water, about to be lifted.

In the 1960s and 70s the Mary Rose Committee collaborated with museum representatives, diving clubs and archaeologists to campaign for legal protection of shipwrecks as vital to the national historical heritage. The Merchant Shipping Act 1894 stipulated that any wreck that was unclaimed and was salvaged had to be sold to pay for the expenses of the salvers. This meant that any shipwreck old enough to fall under the sway of the act was threatened by commercial exploitation. Instead of being carefully excavated and recorded by maritime archaeologists, historically invaluable wrecks risked being destroyed by unscrupulous salvers and treasure hunters. The joint organisation Committee for Nautical Archaeology, of which the Mary Rose Committee was a member, successfully lobbied to grant the wreck legal protection under the Protection of Wrecks Act 1973, with the Mary Rose being among the first to receive legal protection. However, the risk of having salvaged artefacts confiscated was still a very real risk under UK salvage law, and a confrontation had to be averted by continuous negotiations with the Receiver of Wreck, a division of the Maritime and Coastguard Agency. The Mary Rose, along with a few other historic wrecks, was a vital example during the lobbying for the new shipping act as well as the gradual change in implementation of UK salvage law.

The committee handled the small-scale diving operations and underwater surveys of the Mary Rose wrecksite until 1979, when it was decided that the remnants of the ship should be fully excavated and salvaged. This required considerable financial means and a considerably larger organisation, leading to the foundation of the Mary Rose Trust. Prince Charles acted as its president and Margaret Rule archaeological director in charge of excavating and preparing the wreck of the Mary Rose for salvage. The project had already received considerable media attention as well as large donations with which the salvage vessel Sleipner was purchased.

On 11 October 1982 the Mary Rose was successfully salvaged and towed to Portsmouth Historic Dockyard, where it was placed in passive storage until active conservation began in 1994. In the meantime, the Trust built a museum to display exhibits explaining the history of the ship and its 16th century Tudor era context.

== Operations ==
In 2008, the Mary Rose Trust had assets of close to £10 million and income of over £5,700,000, the majority of which came from various donations. It had 56 employees and a further 50 volunteers. The Trust has built a museum in which the conserved hull of the Mary Rose is displayed along with a selection of the thousands of artefacts found inside and around her.

The Mary Rose Trust is a partner organization of the Swedish Vasa Museum in Stockholm, Sweden, with which it has regular exchanges and collaborative ventures. The Vasa Museum has on display the Swedish 17th-century warship Vasa which was salvaged from the bottom of Stockholms ström in 1961.
