= Jim Eyre (architect) =

British architect

Jim Eyre OBE is a British architect and director of WilkinsonEyre, where he has been a partner/director since 1987.

Eyre has worked on a broad range of projects in the past three decades, from transportation and infrastructure to an increasing amount of cultural projects. Those projects include the Museum of London Medicine Galleries, Royal Botanic Gardens Kew, the Cooled Conservatories at Gardens by the Bay, and the Weston Library, Oxford. Eyre's commercial and infrastructure work includes projects such as the redevelopment of Battersea Power Station, Guangzhou International Finance Center, and the award-winning Stratford Market Depot and Stratford Regional station. Eyre has also contributed to multiple architectural publications, including The Architecture of Bridge Design and Exploring Boundaries. In 2019, his work at Battersea was the subject of a profile in the Sky Arts programme The Art of Architecture.

In addition to his practice work, Eyre is also a visiting lecturer and panelist, lecturing at Illinois Institute of Technology, Chicago from 1997 to 1998 and Harvard University Graduate School of Design in 2003–2004. His panel work includes contributing to an expert panel for the Farrell Review and the Liveable Cities initiative.

Eyre is the recipient of multiple awards and attributes; in 2003, he was awarded an OBE for his services to architecture, and in 2009 he was made Honorary Doctor of Laws at Liverpool University. In 2015, he was awarded the Bodley Medal.
