= WilkinsonEyre =

Architectural practice based in London, England

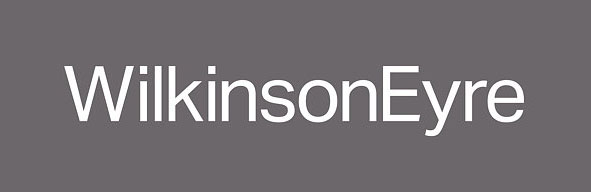

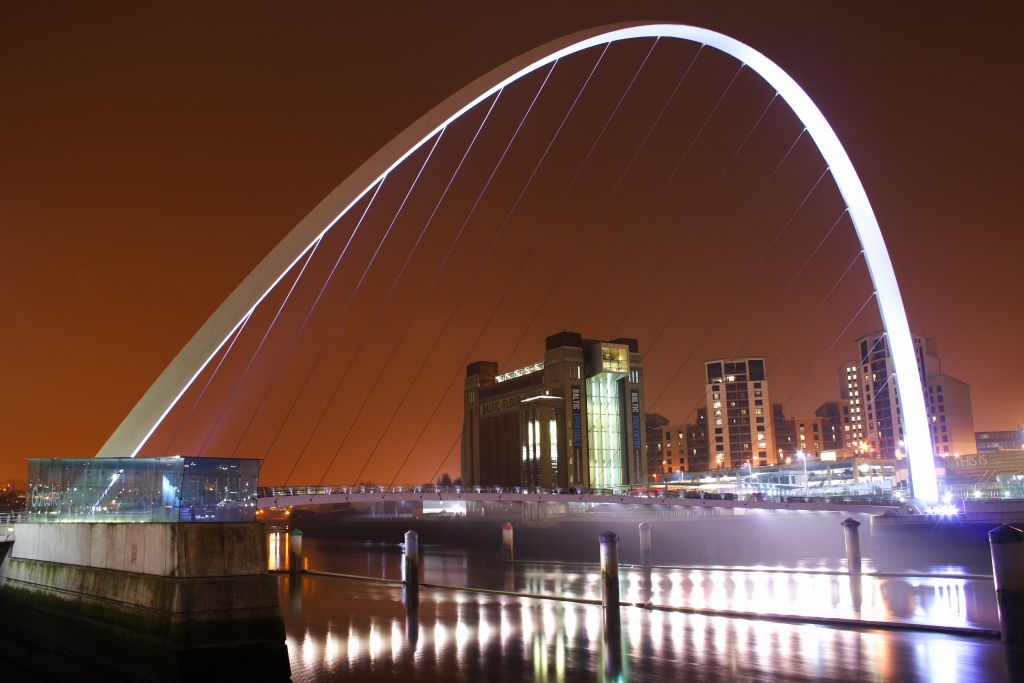
- Gateshead Millennium Bridge

Practice information
- Key architects: Jim Eyre; Chris Wilkinson
- Founded: 1983
- Location: London, England, United Kingdom

Significant works and honors
- Buildings: Magna Centre
- Design: Gateshead Millennium Bridge

Website
- https://wilkinsoneyre.com/

WilkinsonEyre is an international architecture practice based in London, England. In 1983 Chris Wilkinson founded Chris Wilkinson Architects, he partnered with Jim Eyre in 1987 and the practice was renamed WilkinsonEyre in 1999. The practice has led the completion of many high-profile projects such as Gateshead Millennium Bridge, Cooled Conservatories Gardens by the Bay, Oxford's Weston Library and Guangzhou International Finance Center.

== Project list ==
Key projects:

=== Bridges ===
- Twin Sails Bridge, Poole
- The Peace Bridge, Derry, UK
- Forthside Bridge, Stirling, UK
- Gateshead Millennium Bridge, Gateshead
- Lille Langebro, Copenhagen, Denmark

=== Cultural ===
- Wellcome Collection, London, UK
- Cooled Conservatories, Gardens by the Bay
- Weston Library, Oxford, UK
- Mary Rose Museum, Portsmouth, UK

=== Education ===
- Dyson Institute Village (Campus Expansion), Malmesbury
- Magna Science Adventure Centre, Rotherham, UK

=== Public buildings ===
- Hull Paragon Interchange, Kingston upon Hull, UK
- Stratford station, London, UK

=== Tall buildings ===
- Crown Sydney Sydney, Australia
- One Queensbridge Melbourne, Australia
- CIBC Square Toronto, Canada
- Guangzhou International Finance Centre, Guangzhou, China
- 10 Brock Street, London, UK

=== Sports and leisure ===
- Splashpoint Leisure Centre, Worthing, UK
- London Olympic Basketball Arena, London, UK
- Battersea Power Station, London, UK
- Liverpool Arena & Convention Centre, Liverpool, UK

== Awards ==
- BCO Award, 8 Finsbury Circus (2017)
- RIBA Award, Building of the Year, Weston Library (2016)
- AJ100 Building of the Year, Weston Library (2016)
- British Constructional Steelwork Association's Structural Steel Award, Splashpoint Leisure Centre (2014)
- Building Award, Mary Rose Museum (2014)
- World Architecture Festival Award, Sport Category, Splashpoint Leisure Centre (2013)
