= James Dyson =

British inventor and businessman (born 1947)

Sir James Dyson OM CBE RDI FRS FREng FCSD FIET
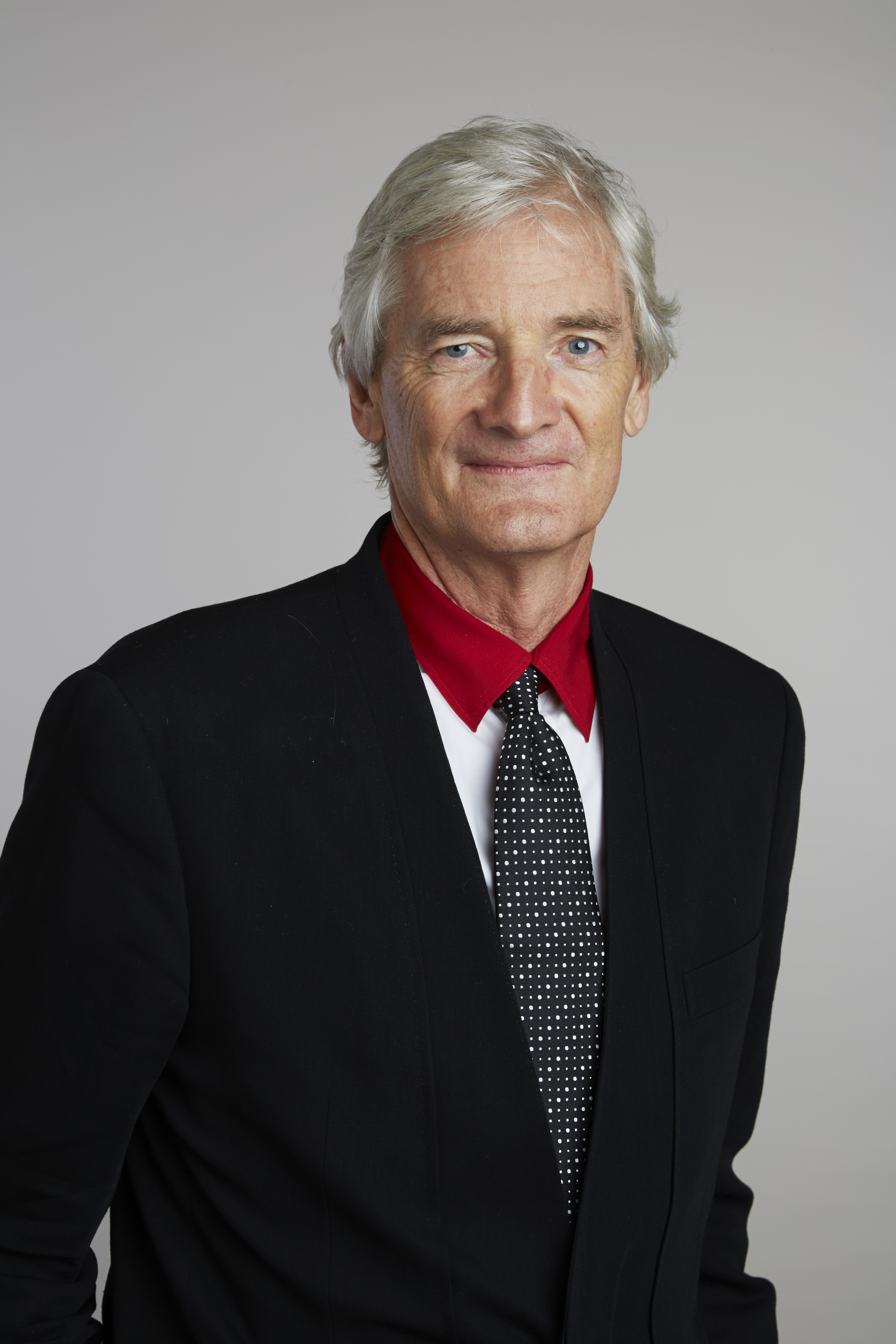
- Dyson in 2015
- Born: 2 May 1947 (age 79); Cromer, Norfolk, England
- Education: Byam Shaw School of Art; Royal College of Art
- Occupations: Inventor; industrial designer; farmer; business magnate
- Spouse: Deirdre Hindmarsh (m. 1968)
- Children: 3
- Relatives: James Dyson (grandfather)

Provost of the Royal College of Art
- In office 1 August 2011 – 1 July 2017
- Preceded by: Terence Conran
- Succeeded by: Jonathan Ive (as Chancellor)
- Website: dyson.co.uk; jamesdysonaward.org; jamesdysonfoundation.com

Sir James Dyson (born 2 May 1947) is an English inventor, industrial designer, farmer, and business magnate who founded the company Dyson. He is best known as the inventor of the bagless vacuum cleaner, which works on the principle of cyclonic separation. In the Sunday Times Rich List 2023, he was the fifth-richest person in the United Kingdom, with an estimated family net worth of £25 billion. As of September 2026, Forbes lists Dyson's net worth as $15.1 billion.

Dyson served as the Provost of the Royal College of Art from August 2011 to July 2017, and opened a new university, the Dyson Institute of Engineering and Technology, on Dyson's Wiltshire campus in September 2017.

== Early life and education ==
James Dyson was born on 2 May 1947 in Cromer, Norfolk, one of three children of Janet M. (née Bolton) and Alec William Dyson. He was named after his grandfather, James Dyson. His father died of prostate cancer when he was nine years old and he described his childhood home as 'penniless' after his father's death. He was nonetheless educated at Gresham's School, an independent boarding school in Holt, Norfolk, from 1956 to 1965, due to the headmaster agreeing to pay his school fees. At school he excelled at long-distance running, and said he learned determination from it.

Dyson spent a year, 1965–1966, at the Byam Shaw School of Art, choosing the school because of its excellent reputation under principal Maurice de Sausmarez's leadership. Dyson credits de Sausmarez's guidance and teaching with inspiring him to become a designer. In 2015 Dyson spoke at the opening of a retrospective exhibition of de Sausmarez's work at the University of Leeds, speaking of the great influence the artist and former principal had on him and his career.

He studied furniture and interior design at the Royal College of Art between 1966 and 1970, before moving into product design. It was while attending the Royal College of Art to study fine art that he transferred to industrial design, partly because of the tutorage of structural engineer Anthony Hunt.

== Early inventions ==
In the early 1970, Dyson helped to design the Sea Truck while studying at the Royal College of Art. His first original invention, the Ballbarrow, was a modified version of a wheelbarrow using a ball instead of the usual wheel and was featured on the BBC's Tomorrow's World television programme. Dyson persisted with the idea of a ball instead of a wheel and invented the Trolleyball, a trolley that launched boats. He designed the Wheelboat which could travel at speeds of 64 kilometres per hour (40 mph) on land and water.

== Vacuum cleaners ==
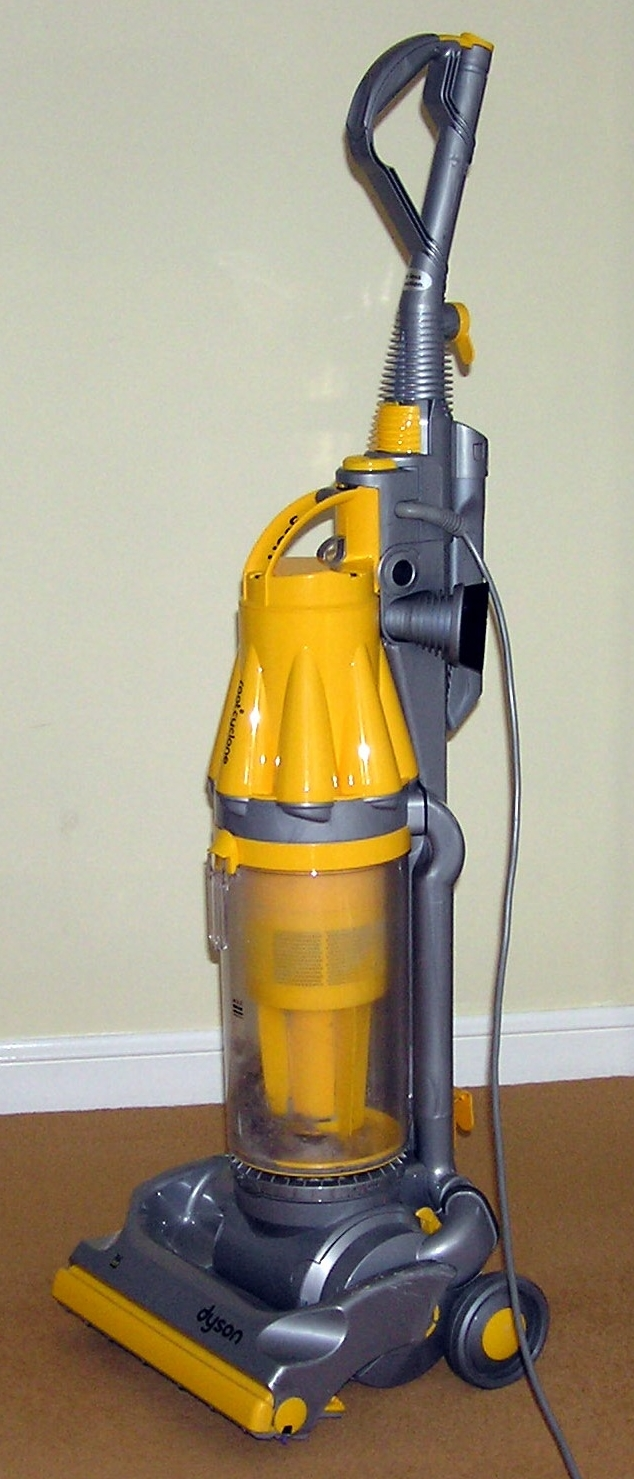
DC07 bagless Dyson vacuum cleaner

In the late 1970s, Dyson had the idea of using cyclonic separation to create a vacuum cleaner that would not lose suction as it picked up dirt. He became frustrated with his Hoover Junior's diminishing performance: the dust bag pores kept becoming clogged with dust, which reduced suction. The cyclone idea came from a sawmill that used cyclone technology.

Partly supported by his wife's salary as an art teacher, and after five years and about 5,127 prototypes, Dyson launched the "G-Force" cleaner in 1983. No manufacturer or distributor would handle his product in the UK, as it would have disturbed the market for replacement dust bags, so Dyson launched it in Japan through catalogue sales. Manufactured in bright pink, the G-Force sold for the equivalent of $2,000, or around $5,500 in 2023 taking inflation into account. It won the 1991 International Design Fair Prize in Japan. Dyson filed a series of patents for his dual cyclone vacuum cleaner EP0037674 in 1980, and when his invention was rejected by the major manufacturers, he set up his own manufacturing company, Dyson Ltd. In June 1993, he opened a research centre and factory in Malmesbury, Wiltshire.

Dyson's slogan, "say goodbye to the bag", proved attractive to the buying public. The Dyson Dual Cyclone became the fastest-selling vacuum cleaner ever made in the UK. It outsold those of some of the companies that had rejected his idea, and became one of the most popular brands in the UK. In early 2005, it was reported that Dyson cleaners had become the market leaders in the United States by value (though not by the number of units sold). Dyson licensed the technology in North America from 1986 to 2001 to Fantom Technologies, after which Dyson entered the market directly.

Following this success, other major manufacturers began to market their own cyclonic vacuum cleaners. In 1999, Dyson sued Hoover (UK) for patent infringement, and the High Court ruled that Hoover had deliberately copied a fundamental part of his patented designs in making its Triple Vortex bagless vacuum cleaner range. Hoover agreed to pay damages of £4 million.

In mid-2014, Dyson personally appeared in Tokyo to introduce his "360 Eye" robotic vacuum cleaner. The new model featured 360° scanning and mapping for navigation, cyclonic dust separation, a custom-designed digital motor for high suction, tank treads for traction, a full-width brushroll bar, and user interface via a free iOS or Android app.

Interviewed by Fast Company (May 2007), Dyson asserted the importance of failure in one's life. "I made about 5,127 prototypes of my vacuum before I got it right. There were 5,126 failures. But I learned from each one. That's how I came up with a solution. So I don't mind failure. I've always thought that schoolchildren should be marked by the number of failures they've had. The child who tries strange things and experiences lots of failures to get there is probably more creative."

== Other inventions ==
In 2000, Dyson expanded his appliance range to include a washing machine called the ContraRotator, which had two rotating drums moving in opposite directions. The range was offered in bright colours, rather than the usual white or silver, although white versions came later. It was not a commercial success and was discontinued in 2005.

In 2002, the company created a model of the optical illusions depicted in the lithographs of Dutch artist M. C. Escher. Engineer Derek Phillips, after a year of work, created a water sculpture in which the water appeared to flow upwards to the tops of four ramps arranged in a square, before cascading to the bottom of the next ramp. Called Wrong Garden, the sculpture was displayed at the Chelsea Flower Show in 2003. The illusion was accomplished by having water containing air bubbles pumped to a slit at the top from which it cascaded down, making it appear that the water was flowing upwards.

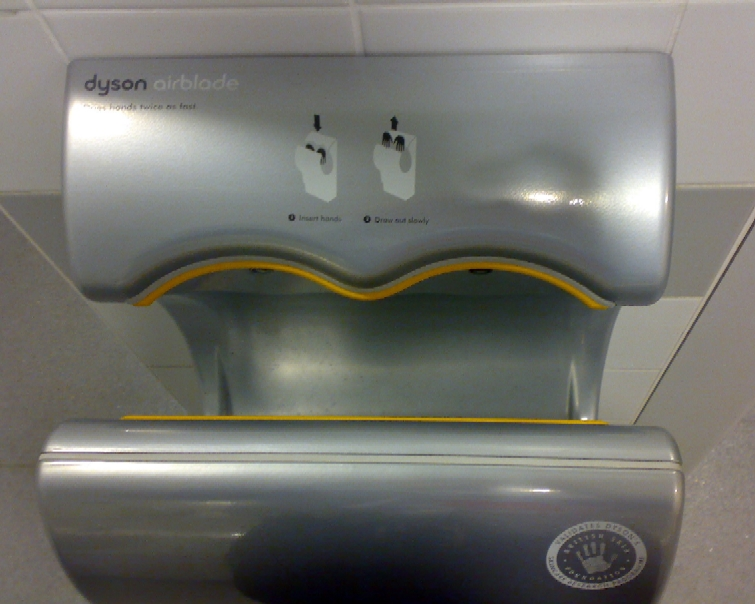
Dyson Airblade hand dryer

In October 2006, Dyson launched a fast hand dryer, the Dyson Airblade, that used a thin layer of air as a squeegee to remove water from the skin, rather than using heat.

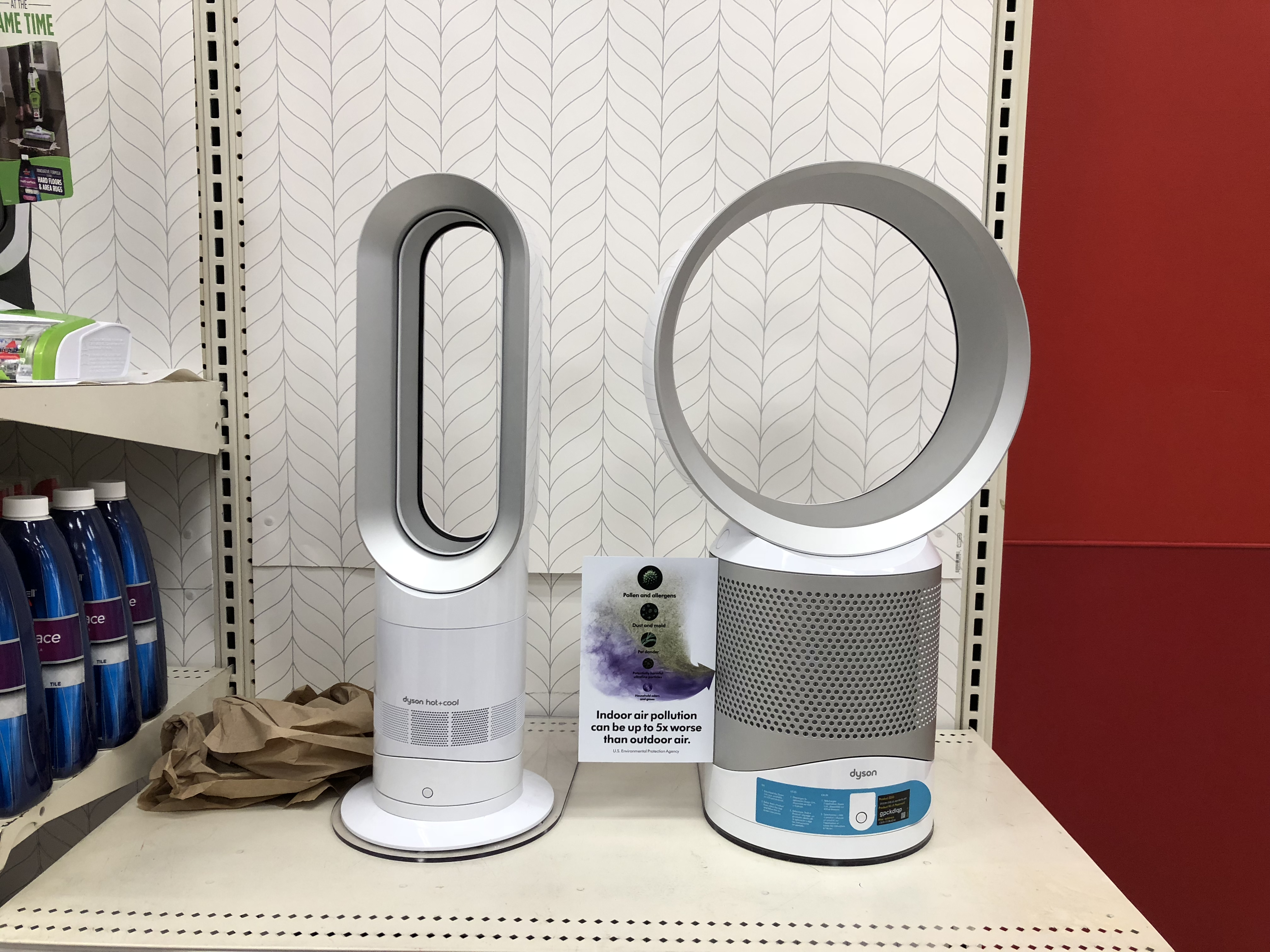
Dyson air-purifier. Some newer models have features like oscillation and adjustment of air flow direction.

A fan without external blades called the Air Multiplier was launched in October 2009. Functions such as heating, air-purifying and humidifying were added later.

In April 2016, Dyson launched a smaller and quieter hair dryer, the Dyson Supersonic.

== Research and development ==
In 2017, Dyson spent £7 million a week on research and development of new products. The company is the UK's biggest investor in robotics and artificial intelligence research, employing over 3,500 engineers and scientists, and engaging in more than 40 university research programmes. Speaking to the Daily Telegraph, Dyson said, "We're looking at more non-domestic products but we are not rushing to do lots of different things," he said. "We are a private company so we can do it when we are ready."

In November 2014, Dyson announced plans to invest a further £1.5 billion into the research and development of new technology, including funding for an expanded campus at the Dyson UK headquarters in Malmesbury which will create up to 3,000 jobs.

The then Prime Minister David Cameron, said: "Dyson is a great British success story and the expansion of the Malmesbury campus will create thousands of new jobs, providing a real boost to the local economy and financial security for more hardworking families. Investment on this scale shows confidence in our long-term economic plan to back business, create more jobs and secure a brighter future for Britain".

In March 2016, Dyson announced a second new multimillion-pound research and development centre on a 517-acre (209 ha) former Ministry of Defence (MoD) site at Hullavington, Wiltshire. The company said it aimed to double its UK-based workforce in the next five or six years. Dyson said: "After 25 years of UK growth, and continuing expansion globally, we are fast outgrowing our Malmesbury Campus. To win on the world stage you have to develop new technology and develop great products and that's what we're doing here.".

In September 2017, Dyson announced plans to produce an electric vehicle, aiming to be launched in 2020, investing £2 billion of his own money. He assembled a team of more than 400 people for the project. According to reports, the vehicle was intended to be powered by a solid-state battery, Dyson having acquired the battery company Sakti3 in 2015. In October 2019, Dyson announced that the electric car project had been cancelled due to it not being commercially viable.

In 2017, he launched the Dyson Institute of Engineering and Technology.

=== Allegations of copyright infringement ===
Dyson has several times accused Chinese spies and students of copying technological and scientific secrets from the UK through the planting of software bugs and by infiltrating British industries, institutions, and universities after they left. He also complained that China benefits from stealing foreign designs, flouting of product copyrights, and a two-speed patent system that discriminates against foreign firms with unreasonably longer times.

== Tax affairs ==
Dyson's tax affairs have been subject to considerable scrutiny in the British press across the political spectrum.

=== Lux Leaks ===
Dyson publicly stated in 2008, "I think it's wrong to direct your business for tax reasons. Your business should be where you can do it best". However, in 2009, his company Dyson Ltd incorporated a new parent company in Malta to create £300 million and £550 million in intercompany loans via Luxembourg and Isle of Man companies that increased tax-deductible interest payments in the UK between 2009 and 2012. The creation of the additional UK tax-deductible interest payments relied on deals with the Luxembourg tax authorities revealed in the 2014 Lux Leaks. The Dyson group stated to The Guardian in 2014: "At no time did the [group's former] non-UK structure deliver any significant tax advantage and, of the entities in question, all have been dissolved".

=== Estimated tax contributions ===
In the 2022 Tax List published by The Sunday Times in January 2022, Dyson and his family were listed as 11th among the UK's biggest taxpayers. The newspaper estimated £101 million was contributed for the last full year on record. The IPPR think tank noted that only two of those listed in the 2021 Sunday Times Rich List – Dyson and the Weston family – were listed in that year's Tax List. In the previous three years, Dyson had featured at 6th, 4th and 3rd in the Sunday Times Tax List, with the newspaper estimating a total contribution of £345.8 million to the UK exchequer. The Tax List estimates the taxes paid by the businesses owned by the people listed, rather than the personal taxes paid, and so is not a measure of how much tax is paid by Dyson on his personal income.

In February 2026, Dyson was ranked 14th in the Sunday Times list, with an estimated £100 million paid in UK taxes.

== Political views ==
=== Pro-Eurozone ===
In 1998, Dyson was one of the chairmen and chief executives of 20 FTSE 100 companies who signed a statement published in the Financial Times calling on the government for early British membership of the Eurozone. He claimed that failure to join the euro would lead to the destruction of the British manufacturing base. In February 2000 claiming that the strength of the pound was affecting his company's profits on exports to France and Germany, Dyson threatened to shift focus from his Malmesbury plant to a new plant set up in Malaysia because the government would not join the euro. Later in 2000 Dyson again threatened to shift production abroad. In February 2002, Dyson announced that production was being shifted to the Far East. In August 2003, the assembly of washing machines was also switched from Malmesbury to Malaysia.

=== Pro-Brexit ===
Dyson was one of the most prominent UK business leaders to publicly support Brexit before the referendum in June 2016. Since the referendum, Dyson stated that Britain should leave the EU Single Market and that this would "liberate" the economy and allow Britain to strike its own trade deals around the world. During 2016, 19% of Dyson Ltd exports went to EU countries, compared with 81% to non-EU countries. In 2017, Dyson suggested that the UK should leave the EU without an interim deal and that "uncertainty is an opportunity". Previously, in 2014, Dyson had said he would be voting to leave the European Union to avoid being "dominated and bullied by the Germans". In November 2017, Dyson was critical of the UK government Brexit negotiations and said "we should just walk away and they will come to us". After it became public in January 2019 that Dyson's company was to move its headquarters from Malmesbury to Singapore, he was accused of hypocrisy regarding his campaign for Brexit.

=== European Court of Justice ===
In November 2015, Dyson lost its case against EU energy labelling laws in the European General Court; however, a subsequent appeal in the European Court of Justice said that the previous ruling had "distorted the facts" and "erred in law".

=== Criticism of Rishi Sunak policies ===
Dyson criticised Prime Minister Rishi Sunak in January 2023 for what he called "ever higher tax bills" for corporations. That May, Dyson said that Sunak had a "scandalous neglect" of the science and technology sector.

== Libel cases ==
In 2022, Dyson sued Channel 4 and ITN over allegations of exploitation of workers at one of his suppliers' factories. In the High Court, it was ruled that there was no personal defamation.

In December 2023, Dyson unsuccessfully brought a libel claim against Mirror Group Newspapers in which he claimed that an opinion article published in the Daily Mirror in January 2022 criticising his company's move to Singapore following his support of Brexit was "highly distressing and hurtful".

== Philanthropy ==
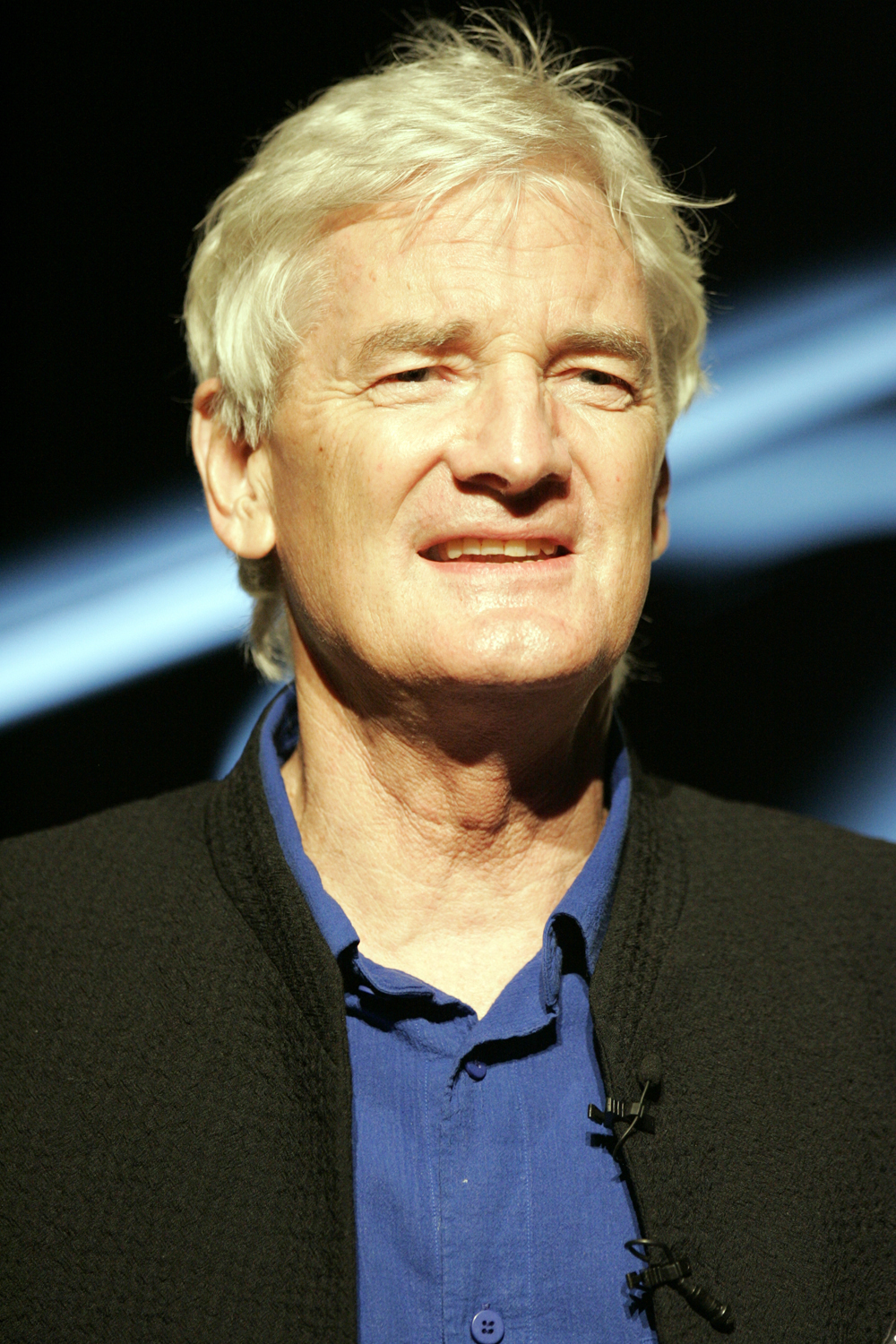
Dyson in 2013

Dyson set up the James Dyson Foundation in 2002 to support design and engineering education. It is a registered charity under English law and operates in the UK, US, and Japan. The foundation aims to inspire young people to study engineering and become engineers by encouraging students to think differently and to make mistakes. The foundation supports engineering education in schools and universities, as well as medical and scientific research in partnership with charities. It achieves this by funding resources such as the "Engineering Box", a box filled with activities for a school to use as a teaching aid.

In May 2014, the foundation announced an £8 million donation to create a technology hub at the University of Cambridge. The donation would also allow for a design and construction lab to be developed for undergraduate engineering students.

In March 2015, the foundation gave £12 million to Imperial College London to allow the purchase of a Post Office building in Exhibition Road from the Science Museum. Imperial College was to open the Dyson School of Design Engineering in this building, and teach a new four-year master's degree in design engineering.

Around 2021, the foundation gave £4 million towards the construction of a £27 million hub for cancer services at the Royal United Hospital, Bath, to be called the Dyson Cancer Centre. This followed a £500,000 donation to the Dyson Centre for Neonatal Care at the same hospital, which opened in 2011.

The foundation supports the work of young designers through the James Dyson Award, an international design award that "celebrates, encourages and inspires the next generation of design engineers".

Dyson is also a trustee of The James and Deirdre Dyson Trust, a separate charity through which he and his wife make personal donations in various fields. In June 2019, the charity donated £18.75 million to Dyson's old school, Gresham's, to build a new STEAM Education building, which was completed in 2021. In November 2023, the charity made a further donation of £35 million to Gresham's School to develop a prep school with a new building incorporating STEAM education facilities for pupils aged seven to 13.

== Honours and awards ==
- In 1997 Dyson was awarded the Prince Philip Designers Prize.
- Dyson was appointed Commander of the Order of the British Empire (CBE) in the 1998 New Year Honours for services to industrial design.
- In 2000, he received the Lord Lloyd of Kilgerran Award.
- He received an honorary doctorate from Brunel University in 1999.
- He received an honorary doctorate from the University of Bath in 2000.
- In 2005 Dyson was elected a Fellow of the Royal Academy of Engineering (FREng) and appointed a Royal Designer for Industry.
- Dyson was appointed Knight Bachelor in the 2007 New Year Honours for services to business.
- Dyson was elected a Fellow of the Royal Society (FRS) in 2015.
- Dyson was appointed to the Order of Merit (OM) in the 2016 New Year Honours for achievements in industrial design.
- In 2017 Dyson was awarded IEEE Honorary Membership.
- Dyson was provost of the Royal College of Art in London until 1 July 2017, having succeeded Sir Terence Conran in August 2011, and is patron of the Design & Technology Association.
- He was chair of the board of trustees of the Design Museum, "the first in the world to showcase design of the manufactured object", until suddenly resigning in September 2004, saying the museum had "become a style showcase" instead of "upholding its mission to encourage serious design of the manufactured object".
- Dyson was elected an international member of the National Academy of Engineering in 2019, for the development of advanced technologies and innovative products and contributions to design and engineering education.

== Personal life ==
Dyson married Deirdre Hindmarsh in 1968. They have two sons and a daughter.

In 1999, he acquired Domaine des Rabelles, an estate and winery near Villecroze and Tourtour, Var, France. In 2003, Dyson paid £15 million for Dodington Park, a 300-acre (1.2 km^{2}) Georgian estate in South Gloucestershire close to Chipping Sodbury. He and his wife also own a house in Chelsea, London.

His vessel Nahlin is the largest British-flagged and -owned superyacht with an overall length of 91 metres (299 ft), and was ranked 36th in a 2013 survey of the world's 100 biggest yachts. He also owns two Gulfstream G650ER private jets registered G-VIOF and G-GSVI. He previously owned an older Gulfstream G650, registered G-ULFS and currently owns a AgustaWestland AW-139 helicopter.

Dyson is a lifelong fan of Bath Rugby and has frequently attended games at the Rec. The Dyson company have been the title sponsors of the club since 2014, with Bath Rugby being the first sports team officially backed by the firm. As a result of this, Dyson are the main brand on all club kit and are the naming rights holders of the East Stand at the Rec.

In July 2019, Dyson spent £43 million on a 21,108-square-foot (1,961.0 m^{2}) triplex flat at the top of the Guoco Tower, the tallest building in Singapore. He sold the flat in October 2020 for £36 million, and in April 2021 it was reported that he had moved his place of residence back to the UK. Dyson has also invested heavily in buying agricultural land in Lincolnshire, Oxfordshire, and Gloucestershire, and by 2014 was one of the biggest landowners in the UK.

Dyson is the beneficial owner of Weybourne Holdings Pte, a Singapore-based business that (as of 2023) owns 31 UK properties, worth at least £287 million.

== Publications ==
Dyson's publications include two autobiographies:

- Against the Odds: An Autobiography (1997) ISBN 9780752809816
- Invention: A Life (2021) ISBN 9781471198748
