= Portsmouth Historic Dockyard =

Manages tourism at HM Naval Base Portsmouth

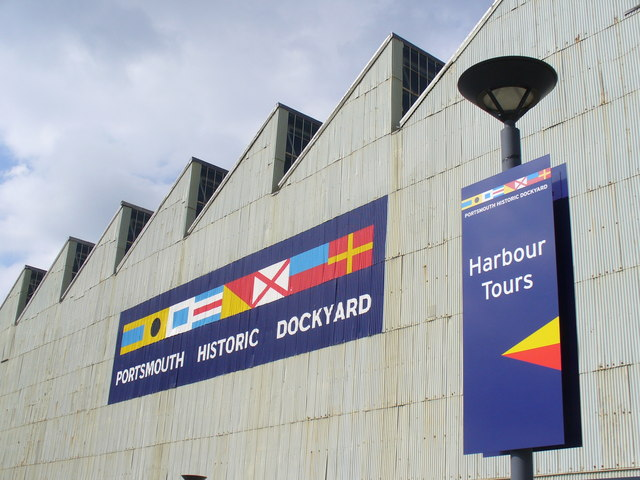
Signage on Boathouse 4

Portsmouth Historic Dockyard, in Portsmouth, Hampshire, is an area of HM Naval Base Portsmouth which is open to the public; it contains several historic buildings and ships. It is managed by Royal Navy Museums as an umbrella organization representing five charities: the Portsmouth Naval Base Property Trust, the National Museum of the Royal Navy, Portsmouth, the Mary Rose Trust, the Warrior Preservation Trust Ltd and the HMS Victory Preservation Company. Portsmouth Historic Dockyard Ltd was created to promote and manage the tourism element of the Royal Navy Dockyard, with the relevant trusts maintaining and interpreting their attractions. It also promotes other nearby navy-related tourist attractions.

== History ==
The National Museum of the Royal Navy was first opened in Portsmouth in 1911. It changed its name to the National Museum of the Royal Navy, Portsmouth to reflect its expanded responsibilities over the Royal Marines Museum, the Royal Navy Submarine Museum, the Fleet Air Arm Museum and Explosion! Museum of Naval Firepower.

== Attractions ==
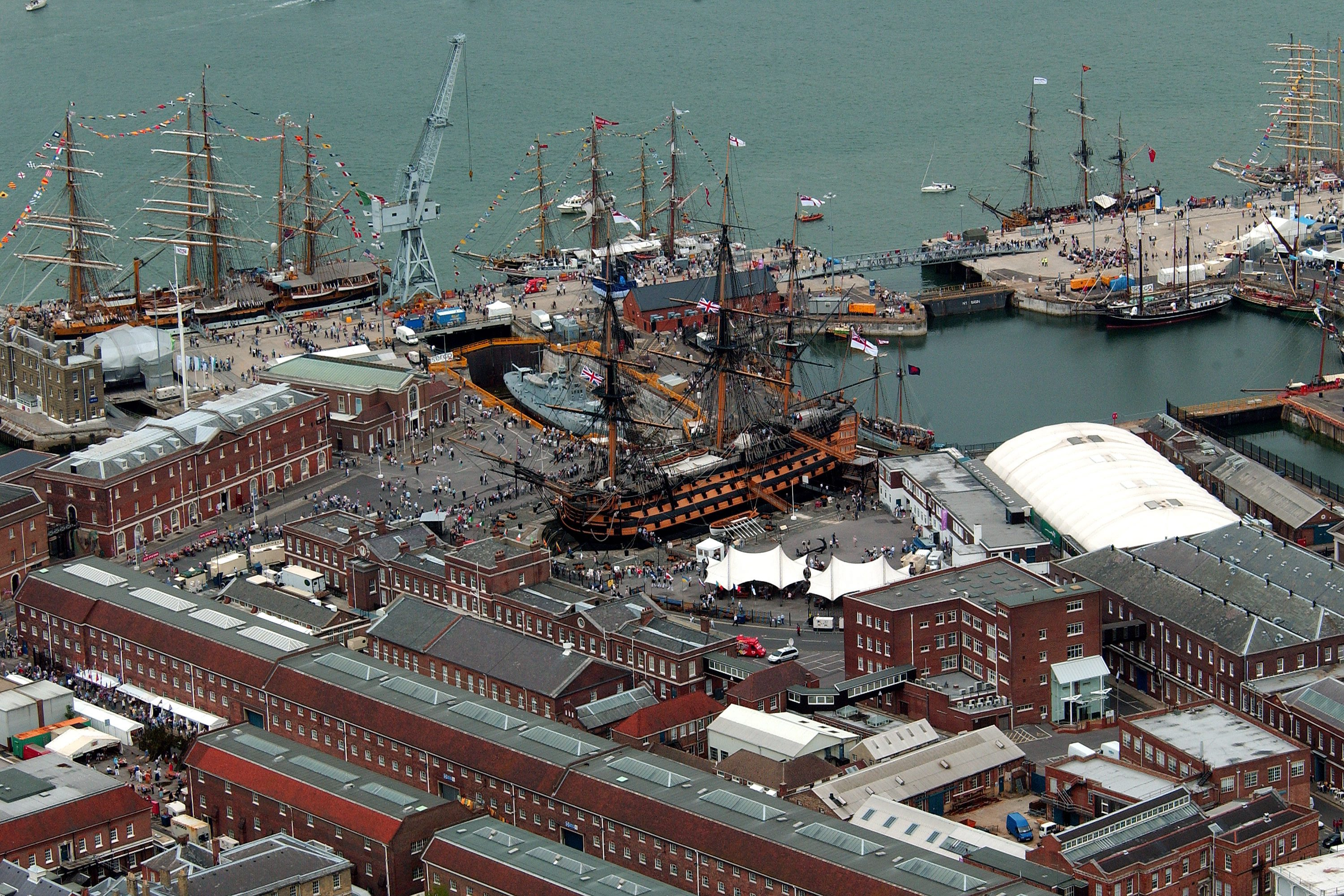
An overview of Portsmouth Historic Dockyard in 2005, with HMS Victory in the centre; the Mary Rose ship hall (since rebuilt) is the white building to the right. Many of the surrounding buildings date from the 18th century.

The following ships and historic vessels are displayed at the dockyard:

- HMS Victory, the flagship of Horatio Nelson at the Battle of Trafalgar. She has been open to the public for nearly 200 years, and has been in her current dry dock since 1922. She is currently (2026) being restored in a project referred to as the "Big Repair", though is still open for visitors.50°48′7″N 1°6′35″W
- HMS Warrior, the world's first armour-plated, iron-hulled warship when she was launched in 1860. She was opened to the public in 1987.50°47′53.88″N 1°6′33.84″W
- HMS M33, a First World War monitor. She was opened to the public on 7 August 2015.50°48′6.7″N 1°6′38.34″W
- The remains of the Mary Rose, a warship of the Tudor navy, which sank in 1545 and was salvaged in 1982. One-third of the hull survives and has been on display in a museum since May 2013. From 1983 to 2009, the ship was displayed in a temporary structure on the same site. The museum also displays thousands of artefacts recovered from the shipwreck.50°47′59″N 1°6′24″W
- Coastal Boat 4, a First World War torpedo boat. Coastal Motor Boat 4 (CMB 4) is the torpedo boat used when Lieutenant Augustus Agar earned a Victoria Cross for the sinking of the Soviet cruiser Oleg moored off Kotlin Island, near Kronstadt, on 17 June 1919.

The National Museum of the Royal Navy is host to many original Naval artefacts, including one of the original sails from the Battle of Trafalgar in 1805. The Trafalgar Experience is an interactive walk-through gallery detailing the Battle of Trafalgar, ending with a panorama painted by William Lionel Wyllie.

Portsmouth Naval Base Property Trust (the "Trust") is responsible for the maintenance and the upkeep of all historic buildings within the heritage footprint of the Historic Dockyard, and operates an ongoing programme of conservation. In addition, The Trust founded the Memorial Flotilla, the finest collection of small boats involved in late 19th and 20th century conflicts, as well as the International Boatbuilding Training College (IBTC), in Boathouse 4, where traditional boat building skills are taught. A large volunteer force is engaged on the restoration and operation of the Trust’s historic collection of boats. The Trust is also managing the regeneration of the 30-acre site at Priddy's Hard, Gosport. The first development phase is due for completion in the summer of 2021, with the restoration of the ramparts and seven listed buildings, to include a new Coastal Forces Museum, micro-brewery, pub, restaurant and holiday let. Thirty new homes will also be built with a further major development phase to follow in the near future.
