= Airblade =

Airblade may refer to:

- AirBlade, a PlayStation 2 game
- Dyson Airblade, a hand dryer
