= Hot-air dryer =

Hot-air dryer may refer to:

- Hand dryer
- Blowdryer
