= Ann Marie Sastry =

American engineer and executive

- Education: University of Delaware; Cornell University
- Occupations: Engineer, educator, and businessperson
- Title: President of Sakti3; Arthur F. Thurnau Professor of Mechanical, Biomedical and Materials Science and Engineering, University of Michigan

Ann Marie Sastry is an American engineer, educator, and businessperson. She was President of Sakti3, a solid-state battery company based in Ann Arbor, Michigan. Sastry was the Arthur F. Thurnau Professor of Mechanical, Biomedical and Materials Science and Engineering at the University of Michigan from 1995 to 2012.

== Biography ==
Sastry got her bachelor's degree in mechanical engineering from the University of Delaware as a Eugene I. DuPont Scholar. She later received a PhD degree in mechanical engineering from Cornell University. She joined the University of Michigan as a faculty member in 1995. While at the University of Michigan, she founded and directed GM/UM Advanced Battery Coalition for Drivetrains and Energy Systems Engineering graduate program.

== Research ==
Sastry has worked in a variety of fields, including composite materials, percolation phenomena, diabetes, and battery materials, design and optimization. According to Google Scholar, as of 2022, her work has been cited over 11473 times.

== Sakti3 ==
Sastry co-founded the solid-state battery company Sakti3 in 2008 as a spin-out of her university lab, with several of her students. The Michigan Economic Development Council (MEDC) gave Sakti3 a no-strings grant of $3 million, in addition to other tax credit incentives issued directly through the State of Michigan, in the hopes it could develop a viable technology that could create permanent, Michigan-based jobs. Sakti3 also received $1 million in funding from the federal government, administered through the Advanced Battery Consortium (USABC). Sakti3 at one time claimed an intellectual property portfolio of 94 patents and patents pending.

Sakti3 was acquired by Dyson in October 2015, with the expectation that Sakti's battery technology could help Dyson become an electric car manufacturer. However, by April 2017, Dyson determined the patents had no utility and abandoned Sakti3's entire patent portfolio and cancelled its licensing agreement. Eight months after Dyson announced that they had relinquished Sakti3's core battery patents, Sastry departed Dyson amid doubts in the field regarding her claim that she was on the verge of commercializing much-sought-after solid state battery technology. In October 2019, Dyson announced that it had scrapped its electric car project altogether.

There is no record that any government entity received any material benefit from their investment despite Sastry receiving a significant personal windfall from the sale to Dyson. Former employees (who were not on staff at Sakti3 at the time of the Dyson acquisition) have criticized the company. Fabio Albano, Marc Langlois, and Steve Buckingham claimed that the company's early patents and methods were useless and that Sakti3 was using an unscalable stacked cell configuration. The only independently verified data on Sakti3's prototypes by the United States Department of Energy show a capacity of 2.4 mAh, only capable of powering very small devices. Steve Buckingham, a former employee, has publicly expressed his disappointment with the small area (one square cm) of the best cell produced. Bob Kruse, formerly GMs most senior electric vehicle executive, stayed on as COO for less than 2 years.

== Awards and honors ==
Sastry has won multiple awards and honors including 1997 NSF PECASE Award (Presidential Early Career Award for Scientists and Engineers), Gustus L. Larson Memorial Award of the ASME in 2007 and Frank Kreith Award of the ASME in 2011. She was named an ASME fellow in 2004.
