= Dyson Airblade =

Electric hand dryer

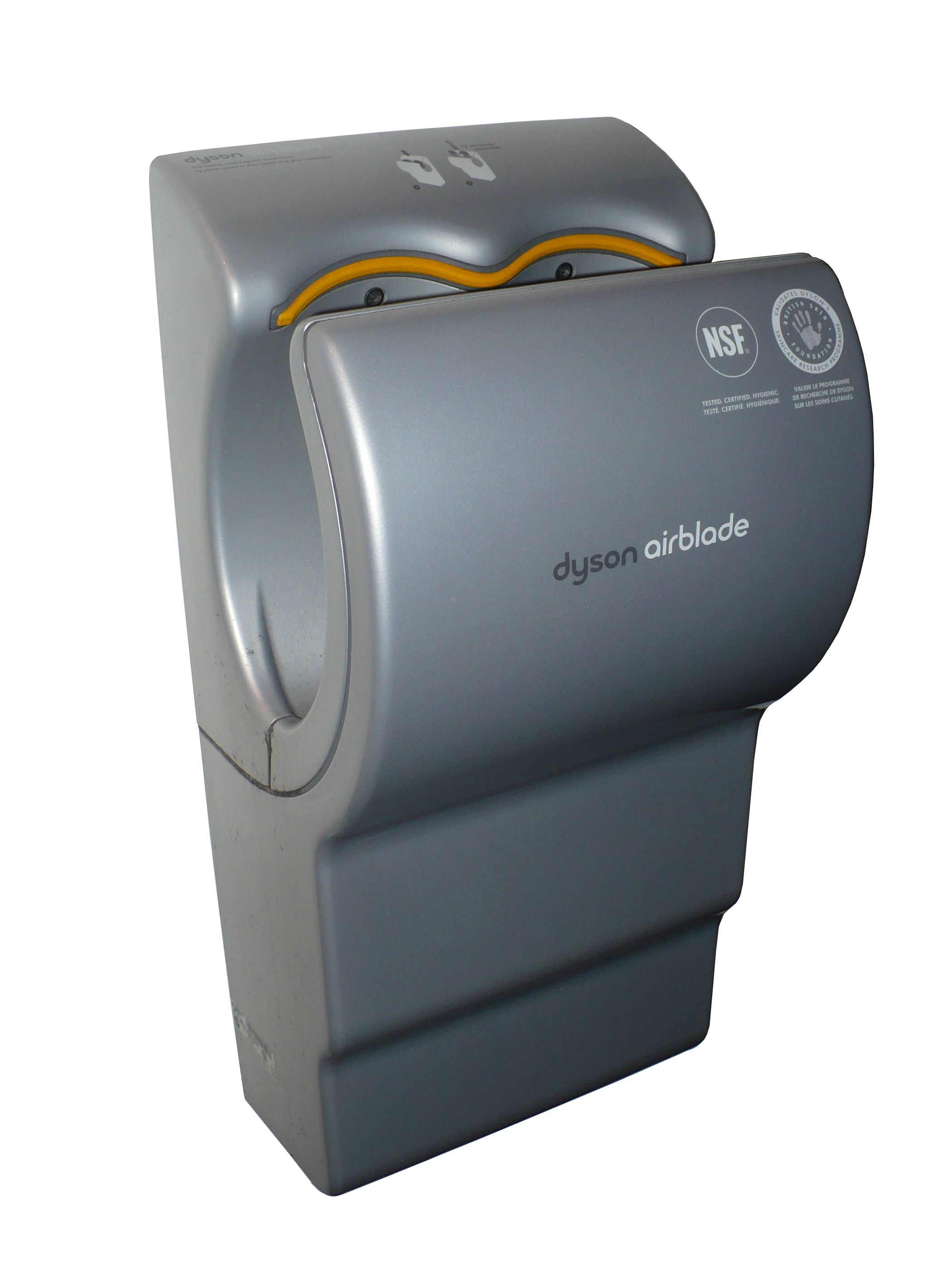
- Inception: 2006; 20 years ago
- Manufacturer: Dyson
- Available: Yes
- Website: http://www.dysonairblade.com

Dyson Airblade is an electric hand dryer made by the Singapore-based company Dyson, found in public bathrooms around the world. It was introduced in the United Kingdom in 2006 and in the United States in late 2007. In 2013 the Airblade Tap was launched, which incorporates Airblade technology into a bathroom faucet enabling washing and drying in a single unit.

== Description ==
Instead of using a wide jet of heated air, Dyson Airblade uses a thin layer of unheated air travelling at around 400 mph (180 m/s; 640 km/h) as a squeegee to remove water, rather than using heat to evaporate the water. The Dyson Airblade is claimed by its manufacturer to dry hands in 10 seconds and to use less electricity than conventional hand dryers.

The first commercially available high-speed, horizontal-wiping air dryer was the Mitsubishi Jet Towel, developed since 1991 and introduced in 1993. It has been available in the United States since 2005. There are several technical differences among electric hand dryers, such as airspeed, water containment, energy efficiency, use of heat, type of filter, motor lifespan, and power usage.

The same technology is used by Dyson in the Air Multiplier fan to create a cooling air stream for personal comfort.

== Energy efficiency ==
According to calculations produced by the manufacturer, the Dyson Airblade is 69% more energy-efficient than conventional hand-dryers, and 97% more cost effective than paper towels. Also according to the producer, the Airblade is cheaper to operate because it does not require hot air which greatly increases electricity consumption. The Airblade is also cheaper to operate due to decreased drying times. The Airblade V can dry off hands in 12 seconds, versus 25 for a traditional hand dryer.

== Drying time ==
A comparative test found that both paper towels and the Airblade dried hands quickly, achieving around 90% dryness in about ten seconds, supporting Dyson's claim of approximately ten seconds of drying time. A conventional warm air dryer took about forty-seven seconds.

== Hygiene ==
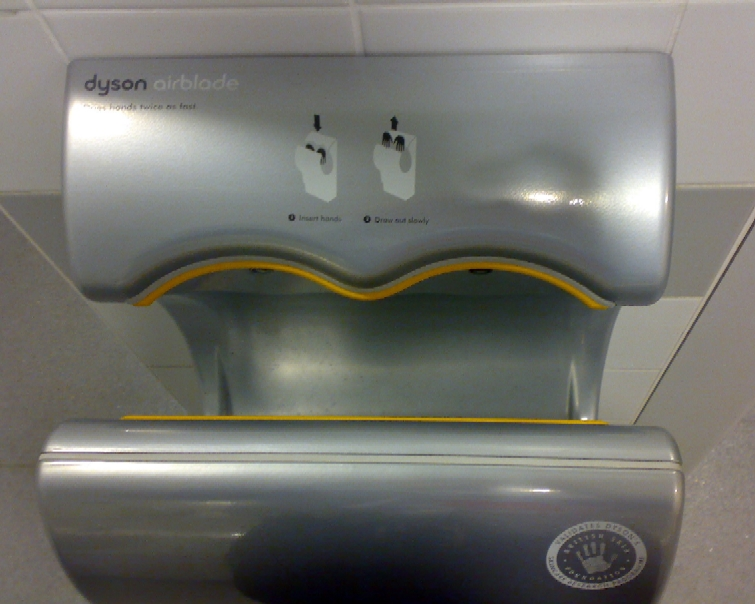
Dyson Airblade (view from top)

In the United States, Dyson worked with the NSF to become the only certified hand dryer under Protocol P335 for Hygienic Commercial Hand Dryers. The Royal Society of Public Health has given the Dyson Airblade hand dryer its first hygiene accreditation.

A paper was presented at the 17th European Congress of Clinical Microbiology and Infectious Diseases, Munich, Germany in 2007 by the University of Bradford and Dyson showing that for a set drying time of 10 seconds, the Airblade led to significantly less bacterial transfer than with the other driers (p < 0.05). When the latter were used for longer (30–35 s) the trend was for the Airblade to still perform better; however, these results did not reach statistical significance (p > 0.05). In addition, the study showed that rubbing hands whilst using the driers counteracted the reduction in overall bacterial numbers at all anatomical sites.

Hygiene associated with the product has been questioned in research by the University of Westminster Trade Group, London and sponsored by the paper towel industry the European Tissue Symposium, which suggests that use increases the amount of bacteria on the fingertips by about 42%; paper towels reduced the number of bacteria by 50 to 75%, while warm air dryers increased bacteria by 194%. The report found that "the manufacturer’s claim that the tested JAD [Airblade] is 'the most hygienic hand dryer' is confirmed ... assuming that the term 'hand dryer' refers to electric devices only... its performance in terms of the numbers of all types of bacteria remaining on the hands of users compared to paper towels was significantly worse."

== Model history ==
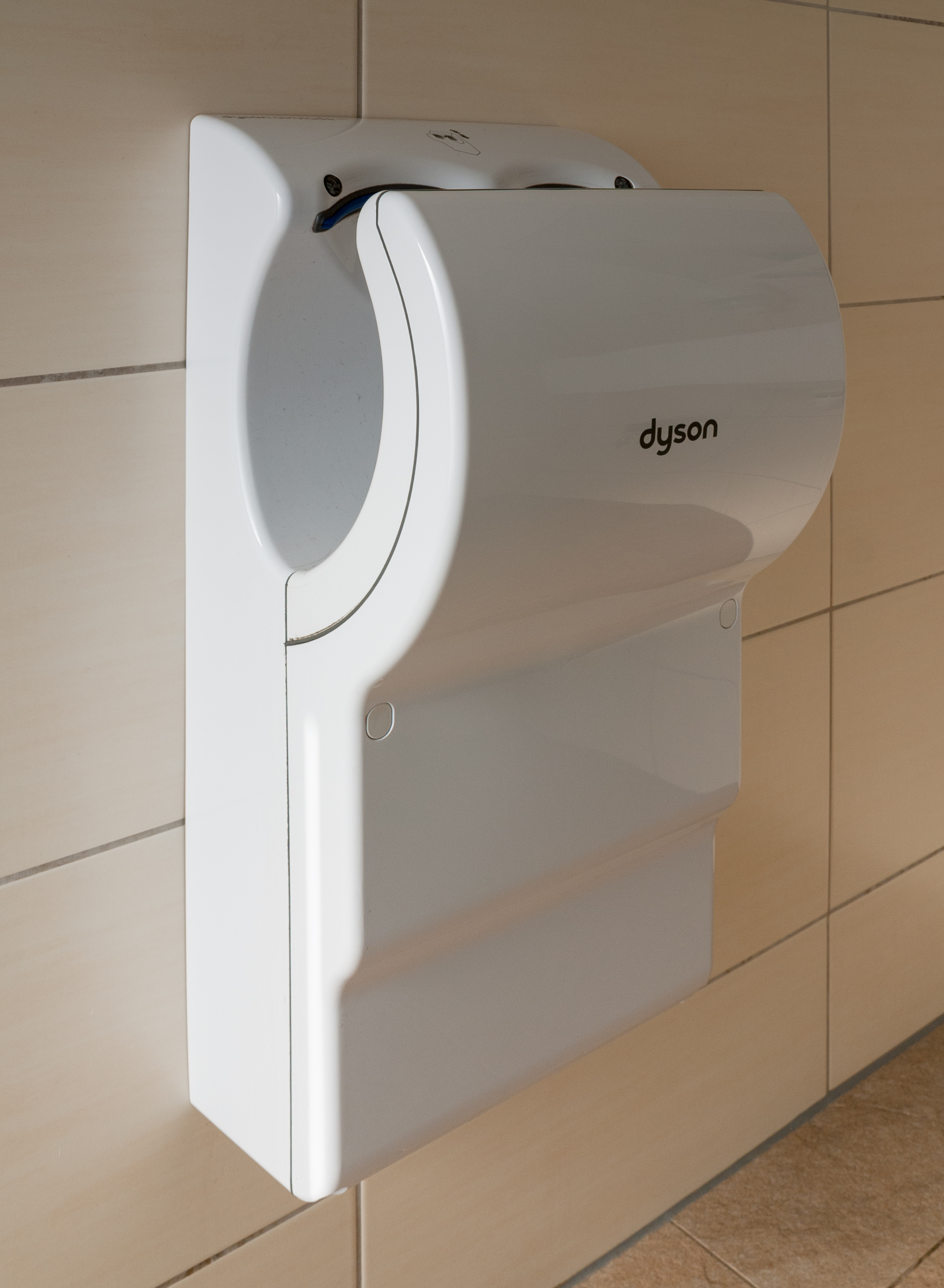
Airblade (AB14) Mk. 2

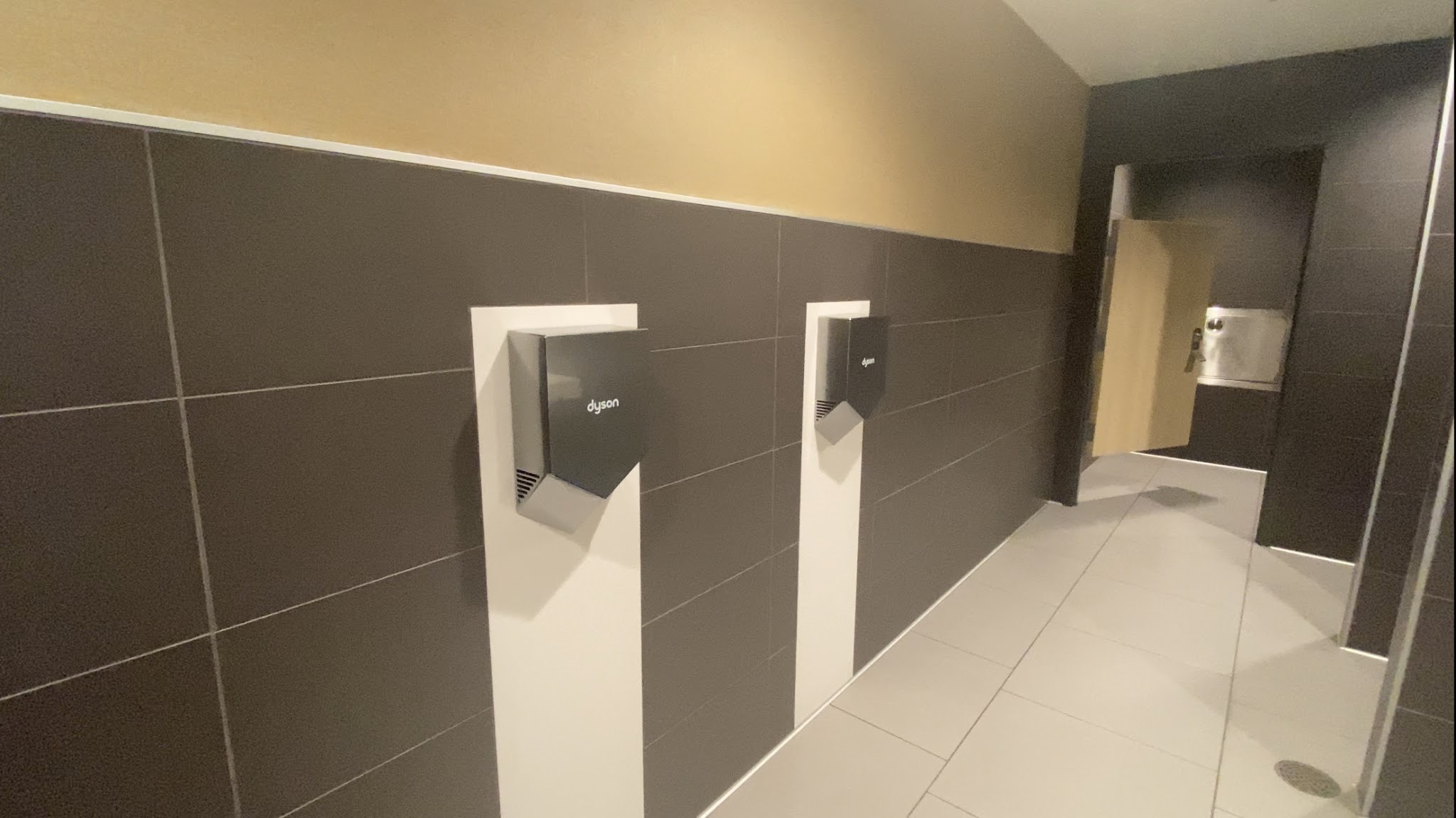
Airblade V (HU02)

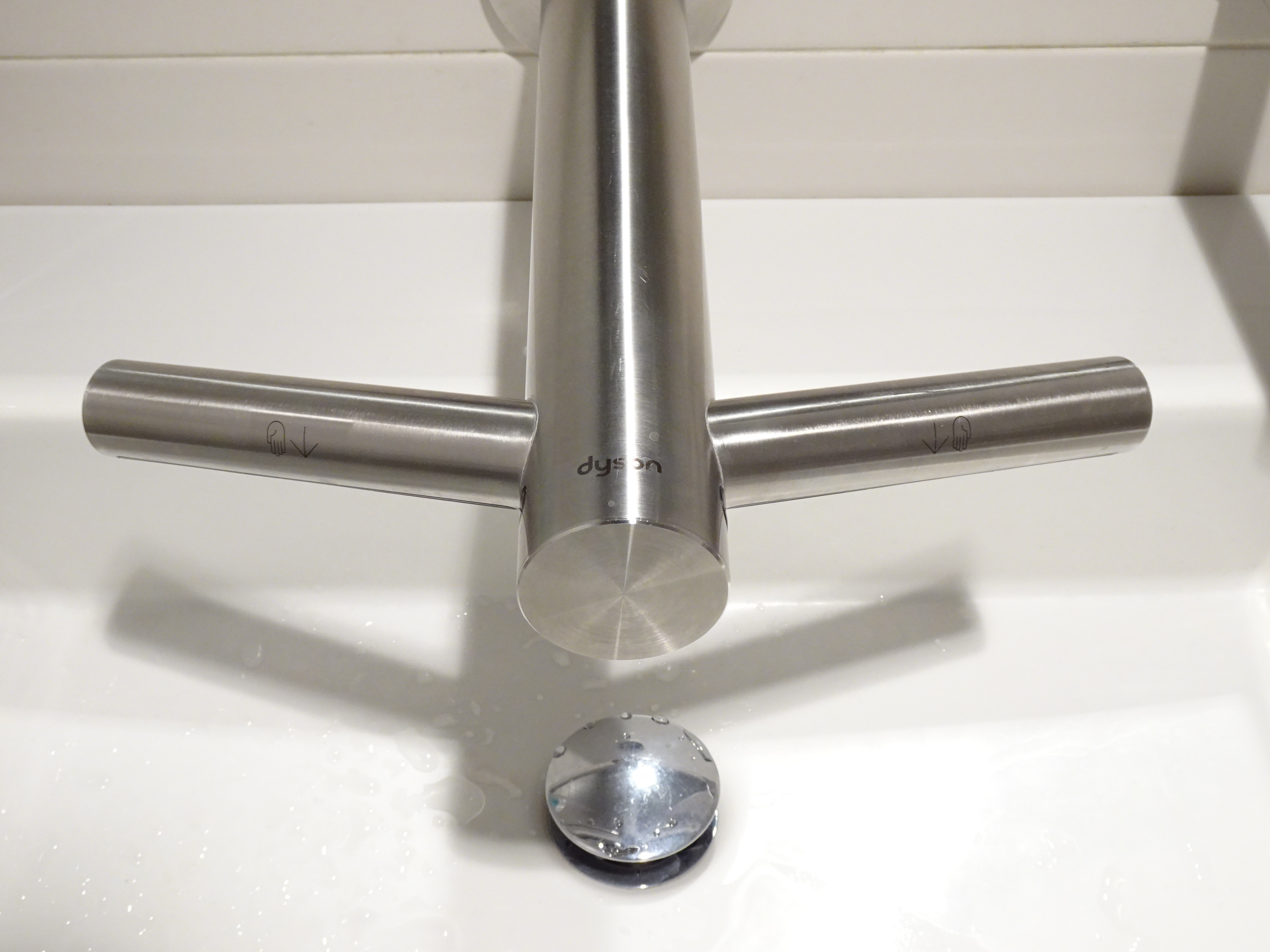
Dyson Airblade Wash+Dry wall hand dryer

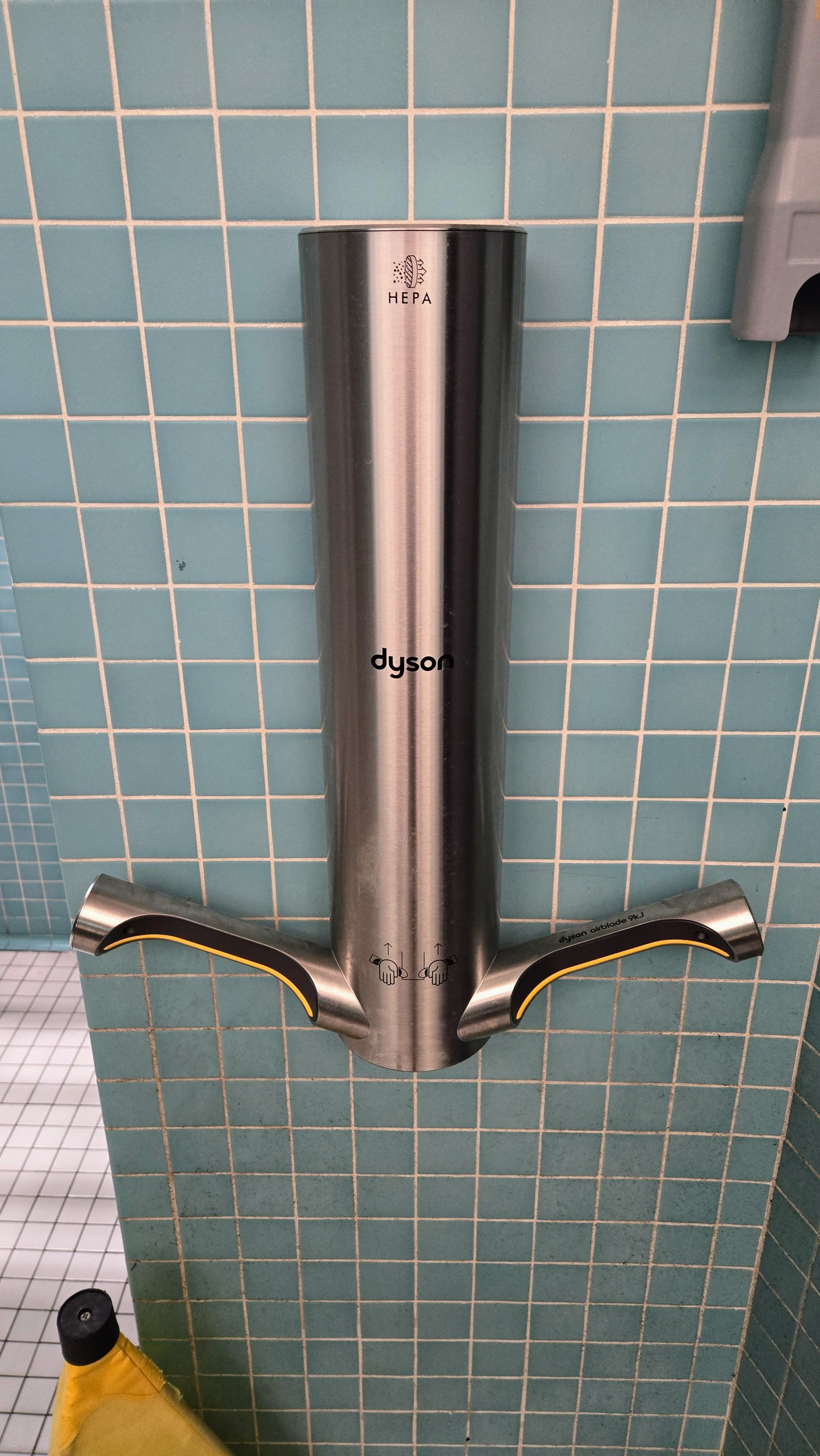
Airblade 9kJ (HU03)

In early 2013, three new models of the Dyson Airblade were introduced: the Airblade Mk. 2, the Airblade V, and the Airblade Tap. The Mk. 2 uses a similar design as the original model, but has increased jet air speed from 400–430 mph (180–190 m/s; 640–690 km/h), and new soundproofing makes the new model quieter than the old one. The Airblade V is a hands-under hand dryer that complies with the Americans With Disabilities Act.

The Airblade Tap is a non-contact bathroom tap that both washes and dries hands. It eliminates the need to move to a separate area to dry hands, and therefore eliminates any water dripped on the floor. All three hand dryers use a new Digital Slim Motor, the Dyson V4.

Model	Year	Features
Airblade AB01	2006	400 mph (180 m/s; 640 km/h) airspeed; discontinued
Airblade AB03	2006	400 mph (180 m/s; 640 km/h) airspeed; discontinued
Airblade Mk2 AB06/AB07	2013	430 mph (190 m/s; 690 km/h) airspeed; discontinued
Airblade dB AB14	2013	430 mph (190 m/s; 690 km/h) airspeed; discontinued
Airblade V AB08/HU02	2013	"hands-under" design; 430 mph (190 m/s; 690 km/h) airspeed
Airblade Tap AB09, AB10, AB11	2013	automatic non-contact faucet with integrated hand dryer. Now known as Wash+Dry.
Airblade 9kJ HU03	2019	Curved Edge design and has Eco and Max Feature

== Controversies ==
On 5 December 2012, a lawsuit by competitor Excel Dryer was filed against Dyson, claiming that Dyson's advertising comparing the Airblade to the Excel Dryer Xlerator were deceptive. Dyson's advertisements stated the Xlerator produces twice as much carbon dioxide, is worse for the environment, and costs more to operate than the Airblade. Excel Dryer charged that Dyson was falsifying its comparisons by submitting a 20-second dry time for the Xlerator to the Materials Systems Laboratory at the Massachusetts Institute of Technology, rather than Excel Dryer's tested 12-second dry time, thus inflating energy consumption figures in the Airblade's favor.

In 2014, a paper was published in the Journal of Hospital Infection (2014;88:199-206), showing that high-speed hand dryers such as the Dyson Airblade can spread large numbers of a harmless test bacteria through the air in the vicinity. The Dyson company challenged the study with its own criticism of the methods and conclusions.

In 2020 a study investigating the sound output of hand dryers found that Dyson Airblade models were among some of the loudest, with one measurement peaking at 121 dBA. These noise levels are considered potentially dangerous to children, who need to stand much closer to the dryers to use them. Following the studies' publication, Keegan, the 13-year-old author was invited to meet Dyson's acoustic engineers.
