= World Dryer =

Manufacturer of hand dryers

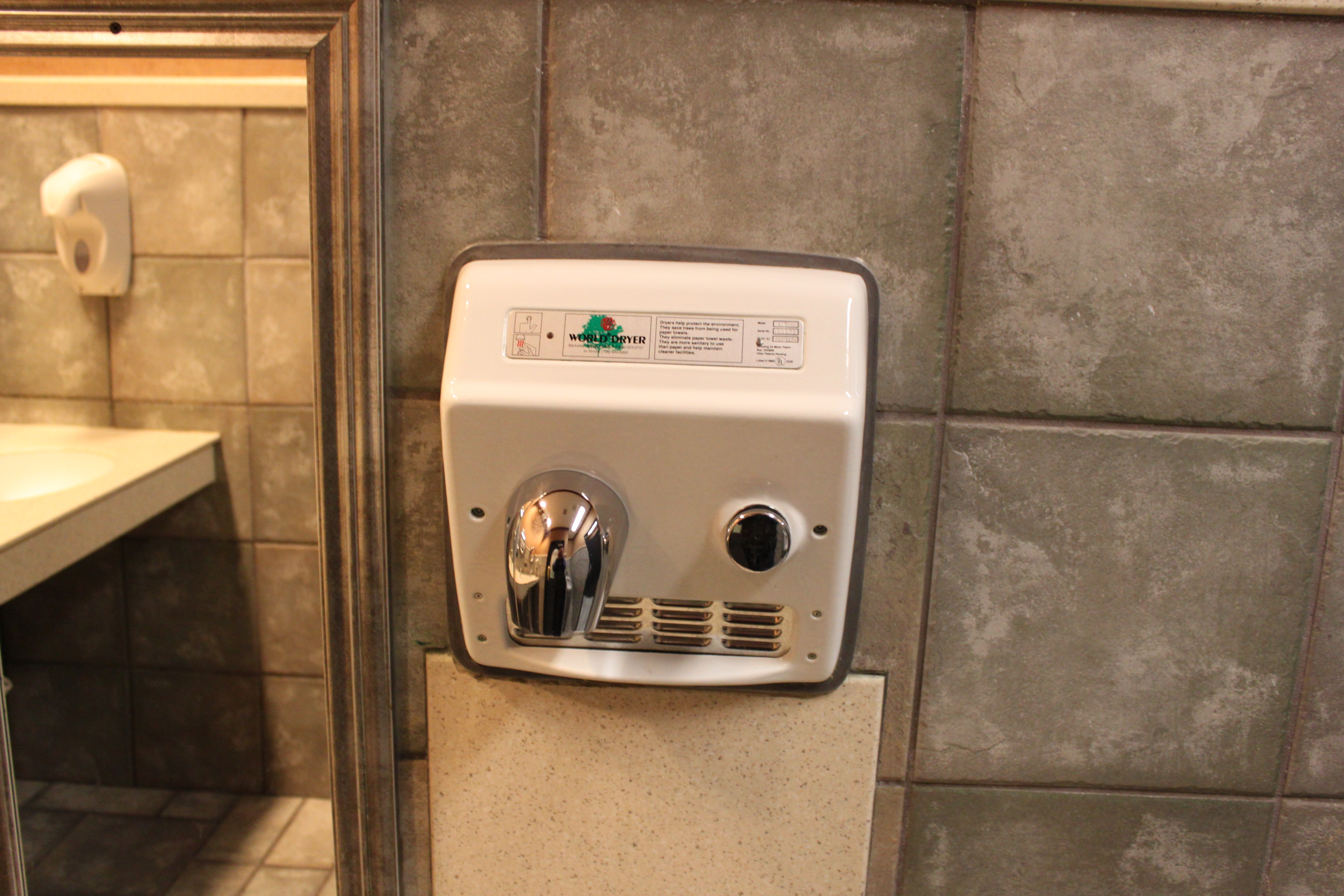
- A World Dryer Model RA5-974 in a McDonald's restroom.
- Founded: 1950; 76 years ago
- Founder: George Clemens
- Headquarters: 5700 McDermott Drive; Berkeley, Illinois, U.S.
- Key people: Tom Vic (President)
- Products: Hand dryers, changing tables, hair dryers
- Parent: Carrier Corporation
- Subsidiaries: Electric Aire, Nova (Hand Dryers), and American Dryer
- Website: www.worlddryer.com

World Dryer Corporation is an American manufacturer of hand dryers and related products. Established in 1950 as a subsidiary of Beatrice Foods, it has also been a subsidiary of the Carrier Corporation. In 2017, World Dryer joined the Zurn Industries brand of Rexnord Corp. It is based in Berkeley, Illinois.

== History ==
World Dryer was founded in 1950 by inventor George Clemens, with the intention of inventing and selling a new hand dryer that could compete against paper towels. Three years later, Clemens patented a new hand dryer design, called the Model A. The original version of the Model A featured a wall-mounted assembly, a cast-iron cover, push-button operation, and a swivel nozzle.

Beginning in 1955, World Dryer began manufacturing and exporting units internationally via a partnership with UK-based Warner Howard Limited (later taken over by Caerphilly-based Personnel Hygiene Services).

In 1968, World Dryer introduced a version of the Model A with a recessed assembly rather than a wall-mounted version. This version, called the Model RA, was modified slightly in 1990 to ensure compliance with the Americans With Disabilities Act of 1990, and was further modified in 2005 with a squashed nozzle (Q Nozzle). Other available options on the Model A include a steel cover rather than a cast iron one (DA) and a fixed non-swivel nozzle (A5).

In 1974, World Dryer was acquired by Beatrice Foods Co., and underwent a rebranding later that year, which saw the introduction of the current dark red "globe" logo. Also in 1974, World Dryer introduced a new hair dryer, called the Model B (later renamed the “Airstyle”), which features the same motor and assembly as the Model A, but the unit is flipped upside down (blowing air up instead of down) and has a longer 80-second timer.

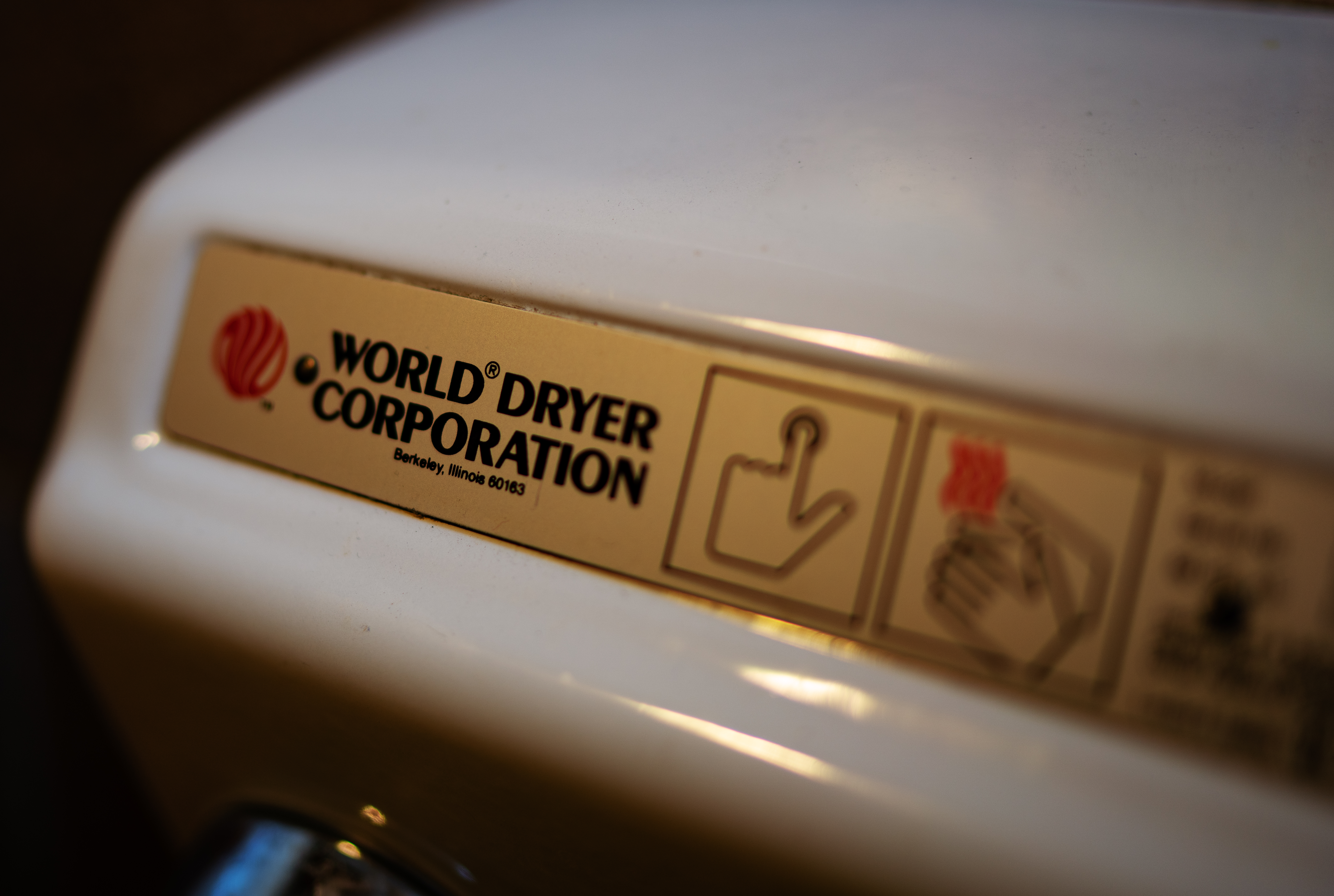
A 1980s-era World Dryer Model A

In 1985, Beatrice Foods Co. spun off World Dryer as an independent company. Model As manufactured during Beatrice Foods Co.'s ownership of World Dryer from the mid-1970s to mid-1980s include the byline "A Division of Beatrice Foods Co" on their front labels. World Dryer sold their hand dryer model units to Bradley Corp with a modified version of their cast iron cover.

In 1986, World Dryer introduced two new low-cost models, the NoTouch and the Airspeed. The NoTouch was the first automatic hand dryer.

In 1987, World Dryer introduced an automatic version of the Model A, known as the XA,

In 1992, World Dryer merged with the Electric-Aire Company.

In 2000, World Dryer acquired Quebec-based Nova Hand Dryers, integrating its Nova line into its offerings.

Beginning in 2005, World Dryer introduced several new models to compete against faster and more modern models that entered the market in the late 1990s and early 2000s, most notably the Dyson Airblade and the Xlerator from Excel Dryer, the latter of which had, by this time, overtaken the World Dryer Model A as the industry standard. The first of these was the AirMax in 2005, which is externally identical to the Model A Series, but is fitted with a larger, more powerful motor, drying a user's hands in 15 seconds. This was followed by the Airforce in 2008, the speed-adjustable SMARTdri in 2010, the ADA-compliant SLIMdri in 2011, the hands-in VMax in 2013, and the low-electricity VERDEdri in 2015.

In 2017 World Dryer became part of Zurn Industries, and in 2022 with Zurn Industries merging with Elkay Manufacturing Company.

== Galleries ==
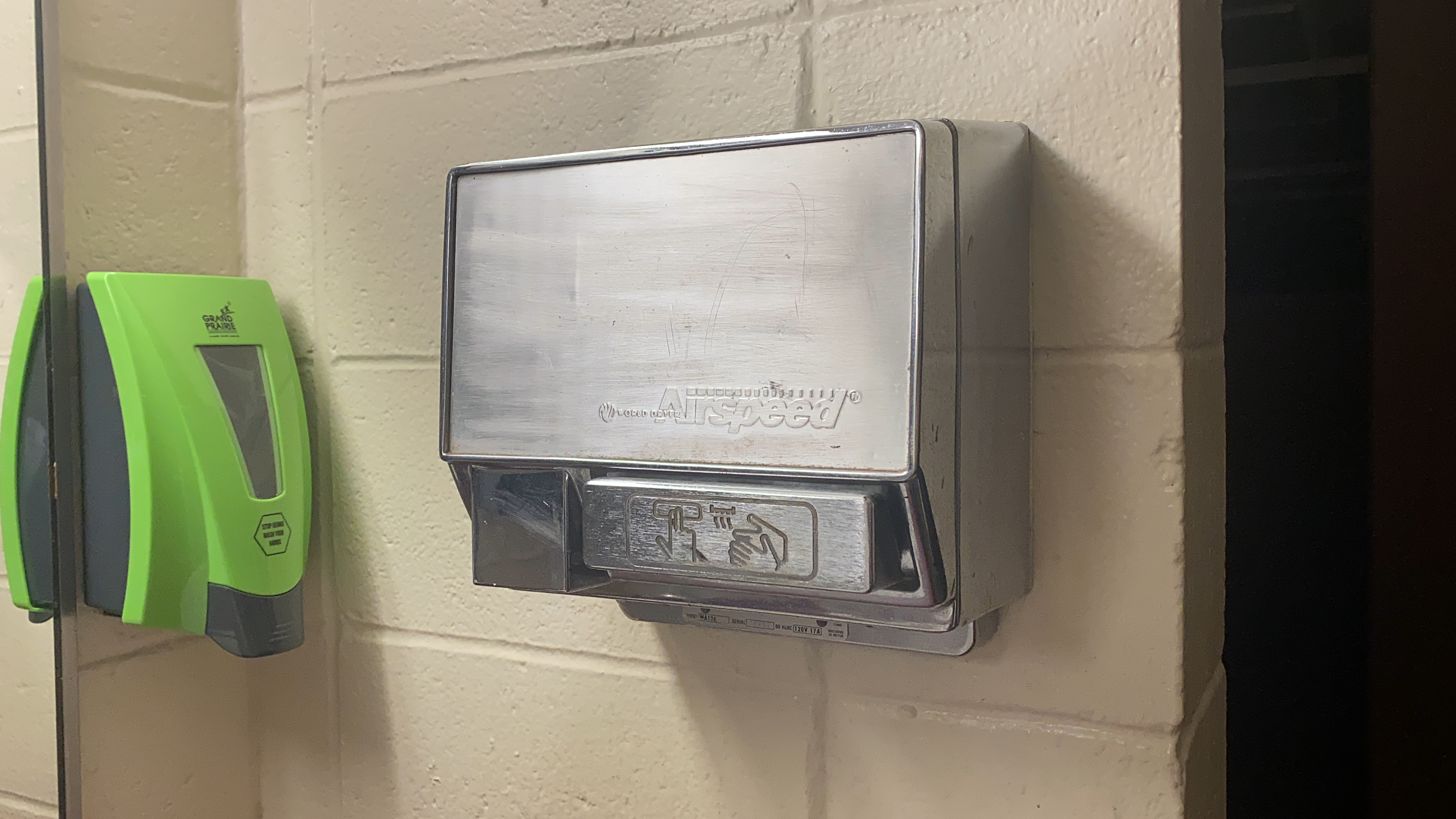
World Dryer Airspeed, sold for a brief period in the UK by Warner Howard before being discontinued

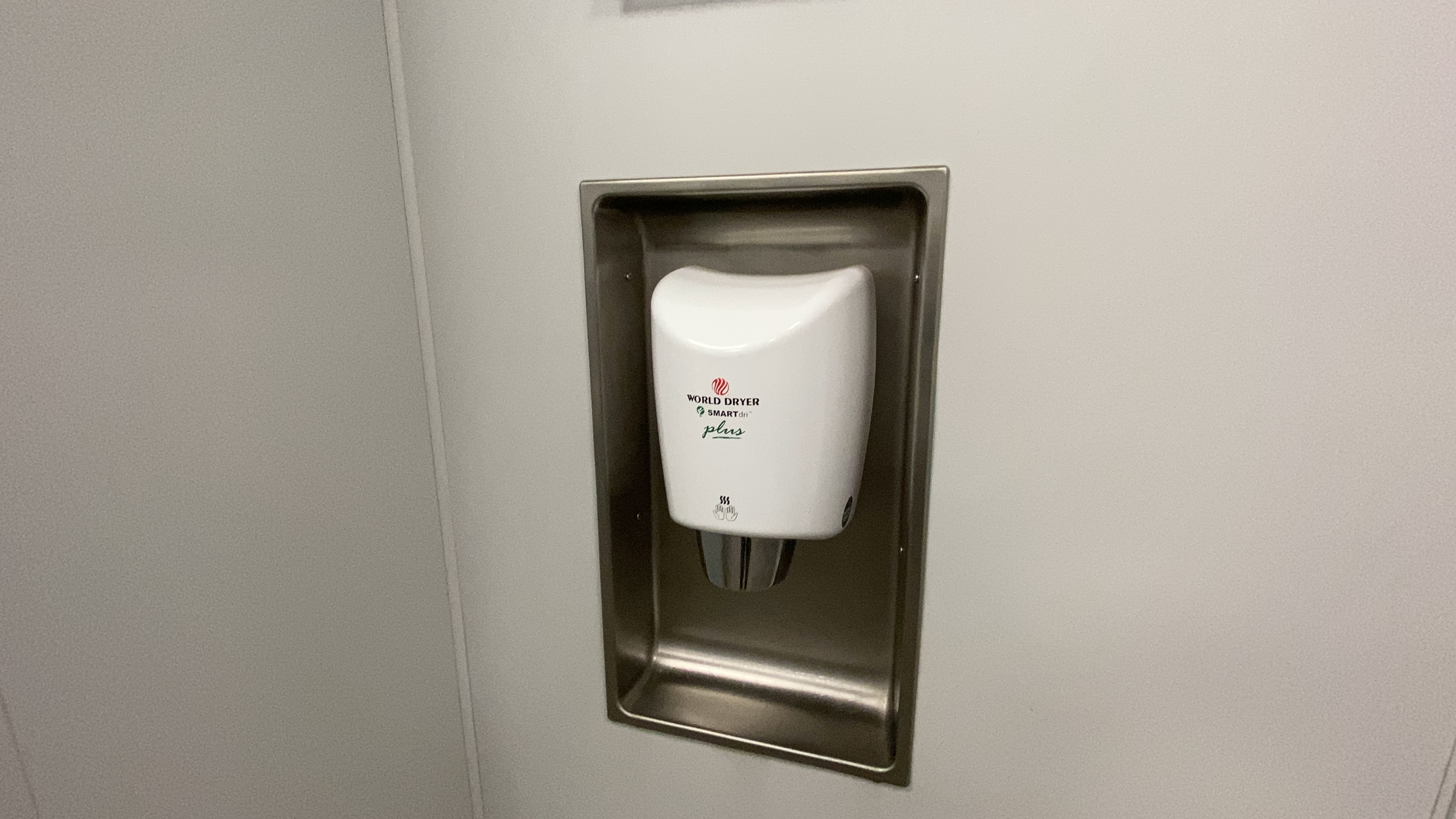
World Dryer SMARTdri Plus, sold by PHS Warner Howard in the UK

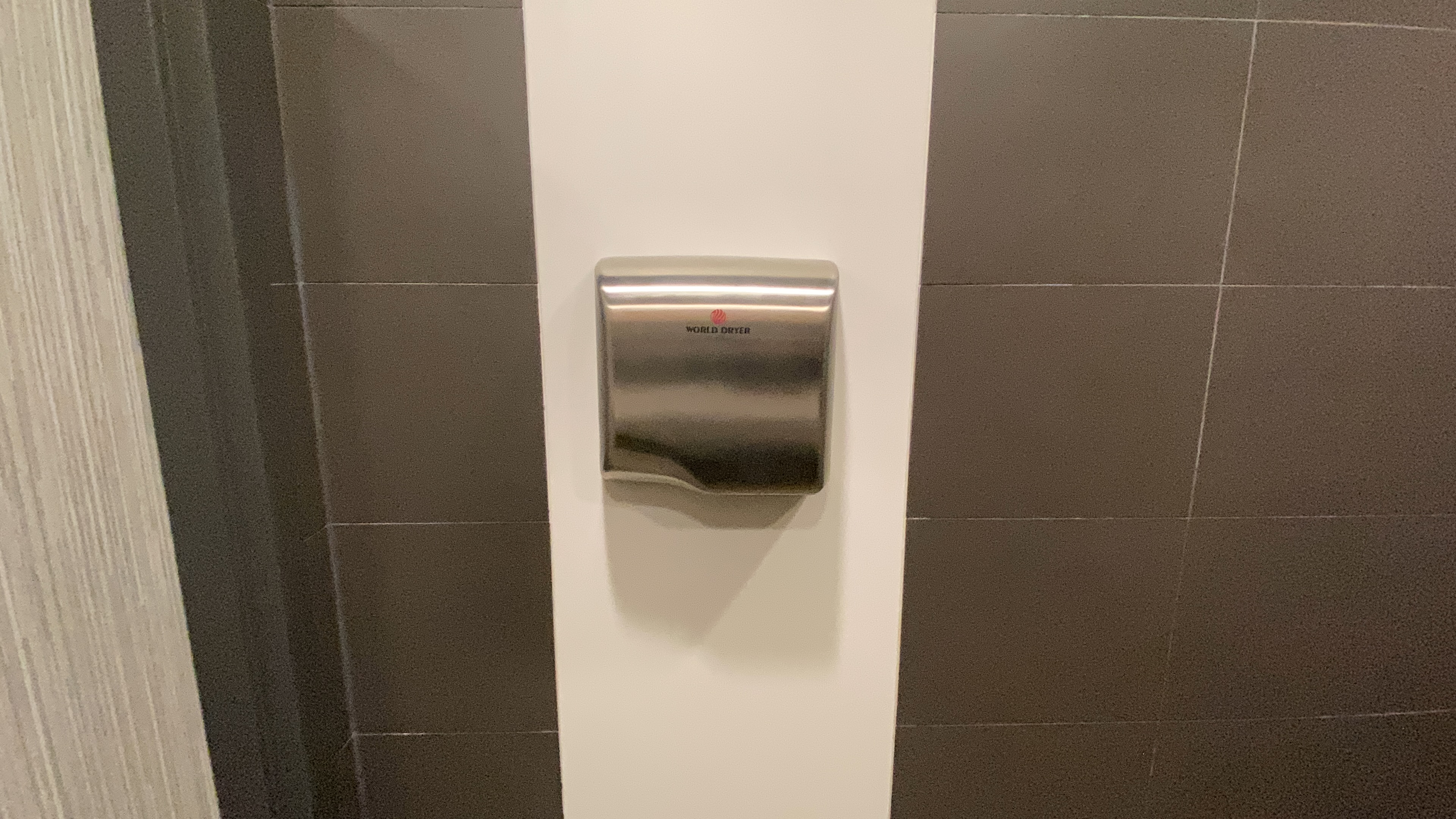
World Dryer SLIMdri in Beverly Hills, CA

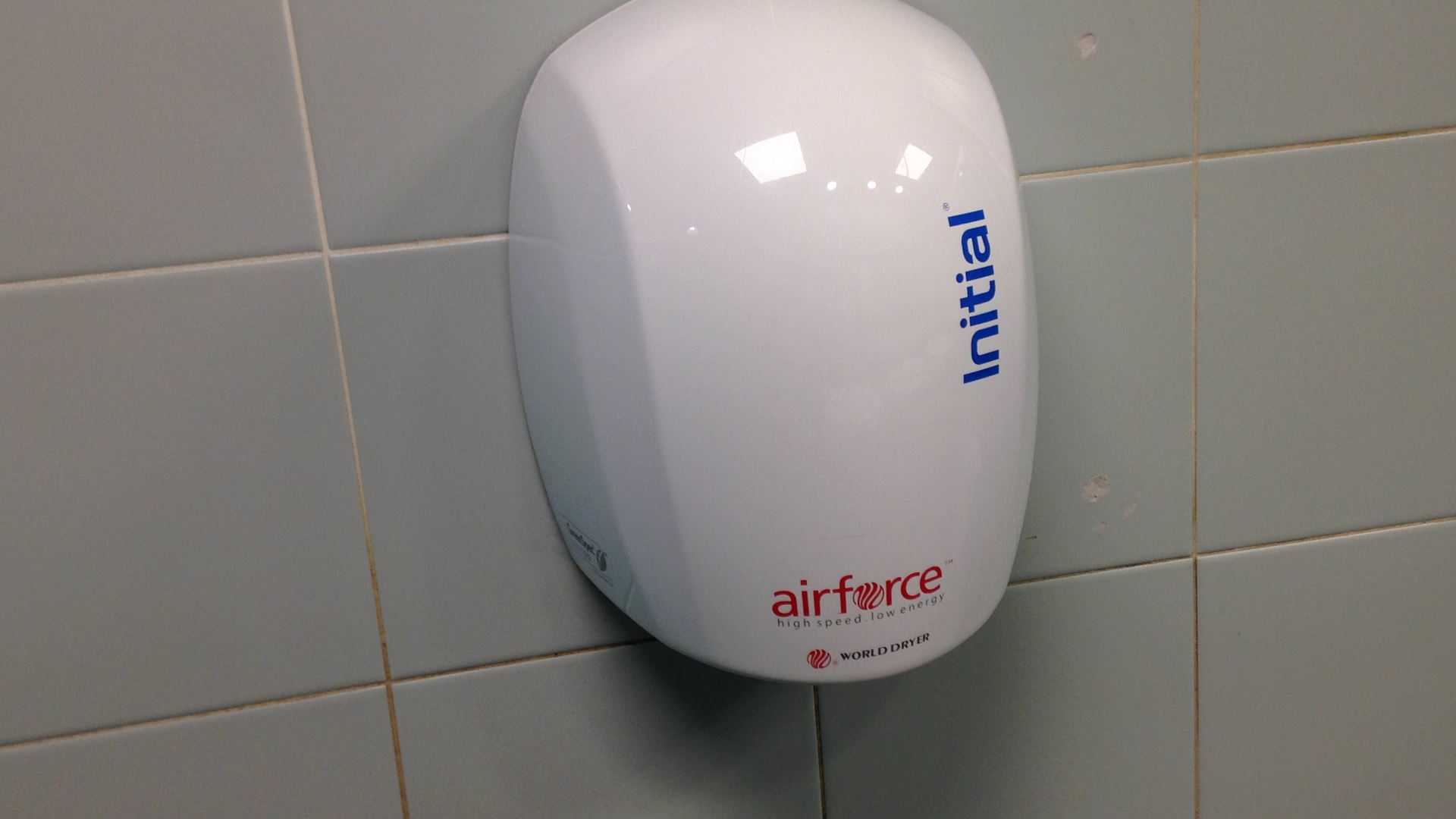
World Dryer Airforce, sold by Initial in Europe; a version also exists with PHS/Warner Howard branding on the left side of the dryer

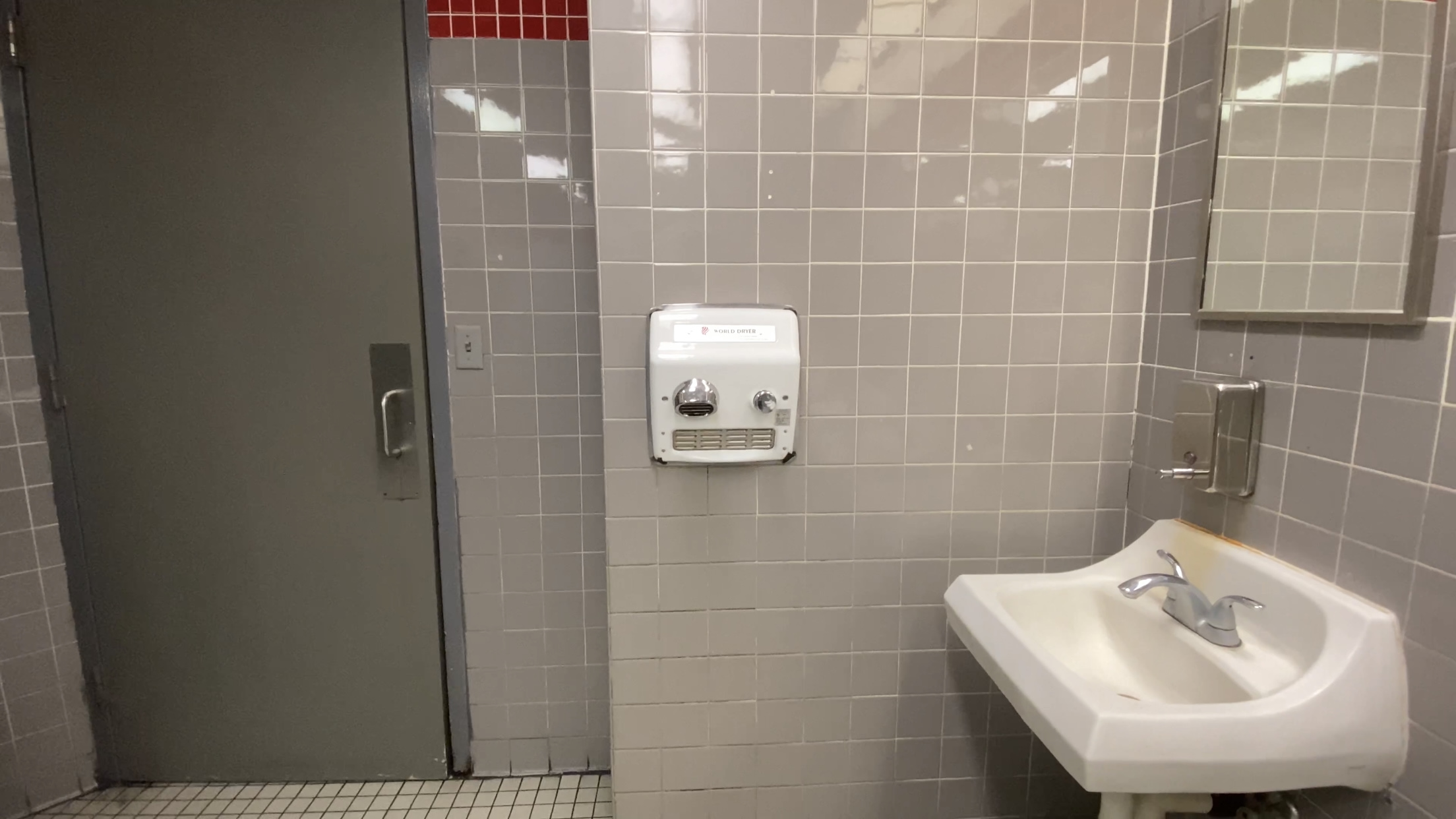
World Dryer Model RA, sold by Warner Howard in the UK for a brief period during the early 2000s before being discontinued

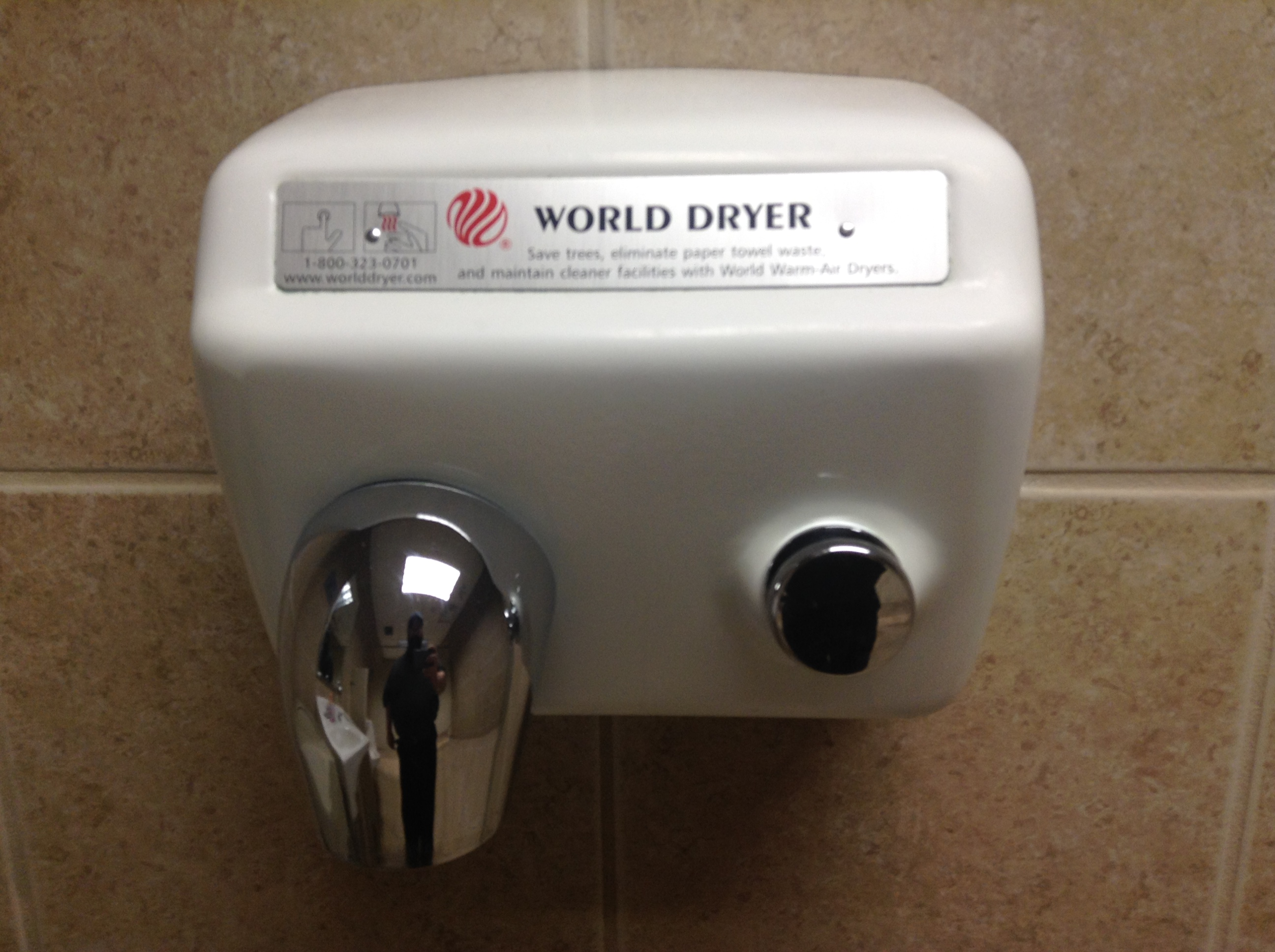
A newer World Dryer Model A series hand dryer, previously sold by Warner Howard in the UK who were eventually taken over by PHS Group

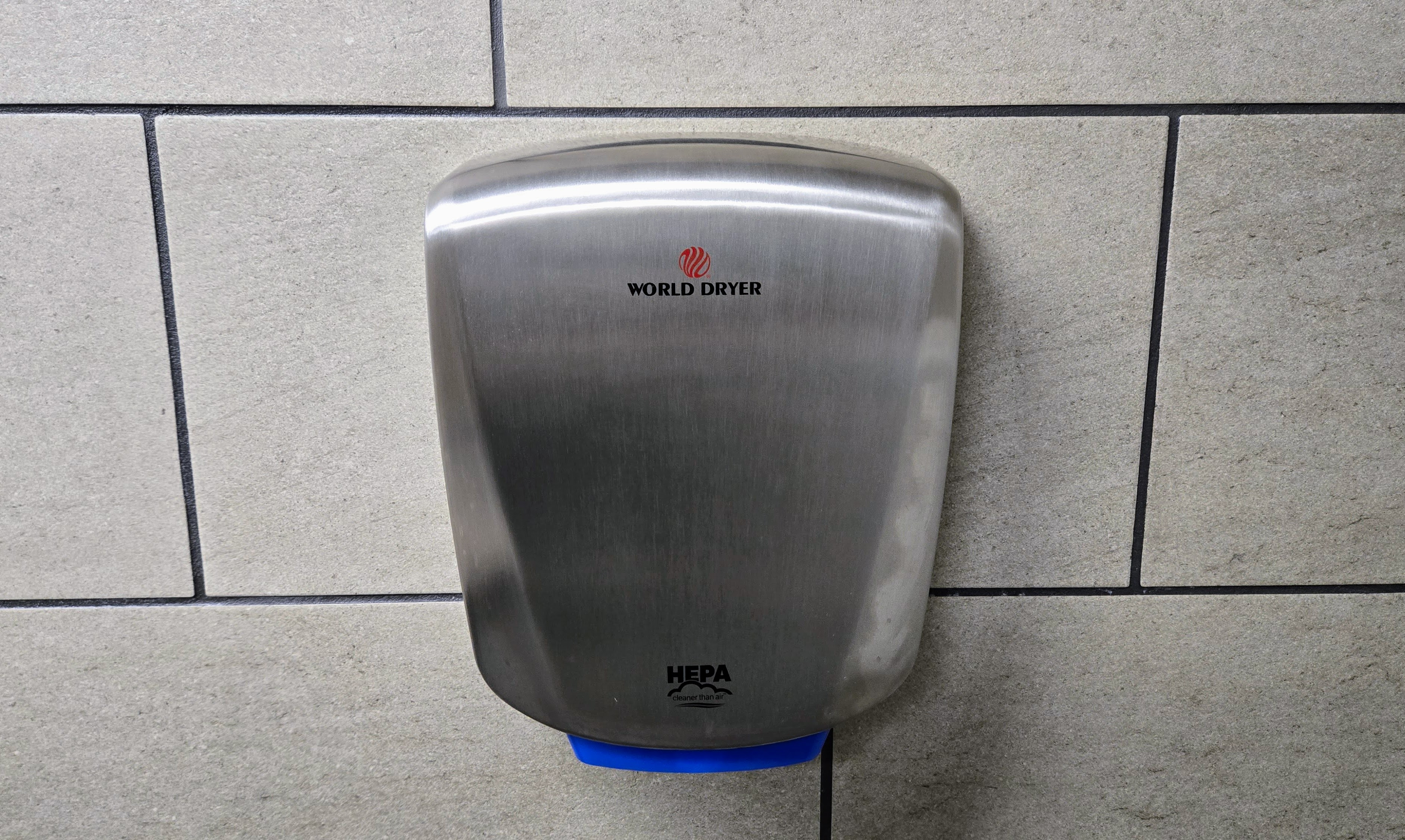
A second generation World Dryer VerdeDri hand dryer in Indiana, PA, sold by PHS Group in the UK and branded “Airforce Slim”

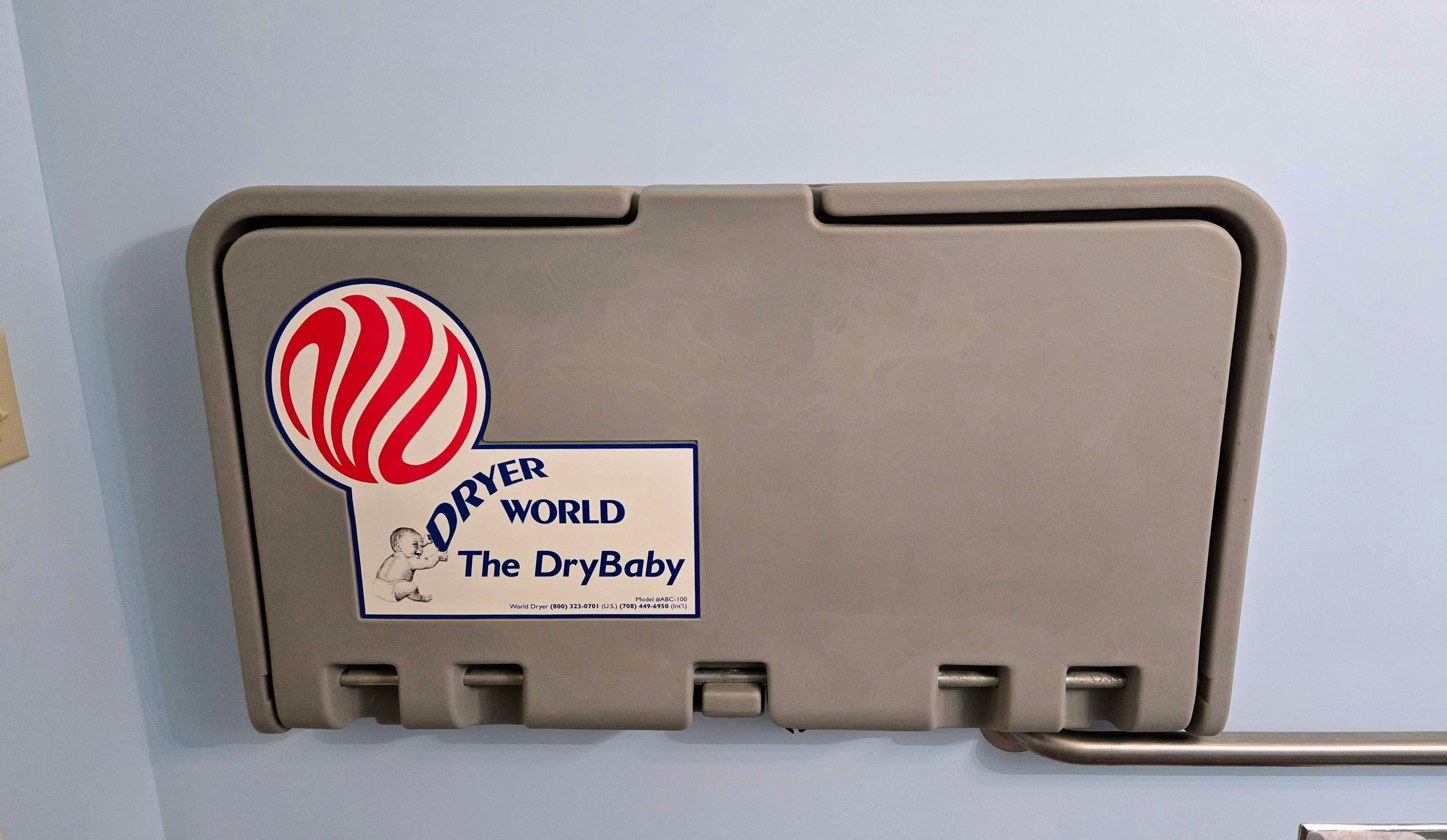
World Dryer DryBaby changing table
