= Sakti3 =

Solid-state battery company owned by Dyson

- Industry: Energy storage
- Founded: 2007; 19 years ago
- Founders: Ann Marie Sastry, Chia-Wei Wang, Fabio Albano
- Headquarters: Ann Arbor, Michigan, United States
- Products: Solid-state battery
- Parent: Dyson Ltd

Sakti3 was a solid-state battery company based in Ann Arbor, Michigan purchased by Dyson in the expectation that it would help with their planned electric car battery, but Dyson subsequently determined that it had no useful patents or technology.

== History ==
Sakti3 was co-founded in 2007 by Dr. Ann Marie Sastry, Dr. Chia-Wei Wang and Dr. Fabio Albano, as a spin-out from University of Michigan in Ann Arbor, Michigan. The founders have been regarded as globally influential battery technology innovators. Publications by Sastry and her collaborators have been cited over 6,400 times. She and her two former students Dr. Chi-Wei Wang and Dr. Fabio Albano formed the company, hence the number "3" in the name; most have remained at the firm, according to a recently granted patent. Work by this group, including Dr. Chia-Wei Wang, Dr. Fabio Albano, Dr. Yen-Hung Chen, Dr. Xiangchun Zhang, Dr. Myoungdo Chung, and Dr. HyonCheol Kim, has been cited extensively (collectively over 4,100 times).

As reported in Scientific American, Sakti3 claimed to achieve 1143 Wh/L in volumetric energy density in its prototype solid-state lithium battery cells in 2014.

In 2015, Sakti3 was invited to the first ever White House Demo Day by President Barack Obama to showcase its innovations.

In 2015, Sakti3 was acquired by Dyson Ltd. Dyson stated that it was "committed to investing £1B in battery technology over the coming years, and Sakti3 is an essential and exciting part of that program." Dyson later wrote off much of its investment in Sakti3, indicating that it could no longer be valued at the $93 million price that Dyson had paid. Dyson eventually also cancelled its plans to develop an electric vehicle. They initially paid $15m for an undisclosed stake, this being Dyson's first outside investment. Later in the year, Dyson paid another $90m for the rest of Sakti3. Other investors had included Beringea, General Motors, Khosla Ventures and Itochu.

== Technology ==
Sakti3 has described methods for producing scalable solid-state batteries, using thin film deposition guided by numerical simulations and optimization and apparently used multiple deposition techniques.

Sakti3 has been recognized with several technical awards, including MIT Technology Review's Top 50 Most Disruptive Companies in 2012, and MIT Technology Review's 50 Smartest Companies in 2015. In 2014, Sakti3 is named by Crain's Detroit Business as one of its Most Innovative Companies for its patents on "methods for manufacturing batteries, a solid-state propulsion system and automotive hybrid technology."

Sakti3 has grown its intellectual property portfolio to 94 patents and patents pending. In 2017, it abandoned its licenses of its early University of Michigan patents.

== Culture ==
Sakti3 won the AWE Workplace Excellence Seal of Approval Award for its "exemplary commitment to building excellent places to work" in 2015, 2016, and 2017. Sakti3 was named 101 Best and Brightest Companies to Work For in 2015 and 2016 for its "commitment to excellence in their human resource practices and employee enrichment." Sakti3 was also awarded Crain's Detroit Cool Places to Work in Michigan in 2016.

== Criticism ==
Sakti3 has been criticized for its secretive nature, a trait it apparently shares with its acquirer. Dyson takes great measures to protect its technology and is "as secretive" as Apple. During a tour of Dyson's facilities, a New York Times reporter observed that "employees remain tight-lipped, even among themselves, about their projects;" "prototypes were covered in tarps while large areas of the open-plan offices were off limits;" and "machinery in some of the research labs was obscured with black trash bags."

Claims made by the company over technological advances as well as its secretive behavior regarding sharing data have been criticized by former employees and media following the acquisition by Dyson. The only independently verified data on Sakti3's prototypes by the United States Department of Energy show a capacity of 2.4 mAh, only capable of powering very small devices. Steve Buckingham, a former employee, has publicly expressed his disappointment with the small area (1 cm^{2}) of the best cell produced. Bob Kruse, formerly GM's most senior electric vehicle executive, stayed on as COO for less than 2 years. In November 2017 Ann Marie Sastry, Sakti3's founder, unexpectedly and quietly exited from the company, which stoked speculation that the company oversold their early successes.

== Speculation ==
In an interview by Car and Driver in 2015, when asked the readiness of Sakti3's batteries for automotive applications, Dr. Ann Marie Sastry responded that Sakti3 would first go to markets where their batteries can meet regulatory standards for the products and pointed out that durability standards for batteries in automotive applications are very different from phones or vacuums.

The company has been praised for staying afloat and being acquired, during an intense period of bankruptcies in cleantech. It has been pointed out that it takes a decade to invent a new hardware technology, and more than another decade for the invention to reach the hands of consumers. It took James Dyson 15 years and 5,127 attempts to perfect his flagship vacuum.
