= Excel Dryer =

American hand dryer manufacturer

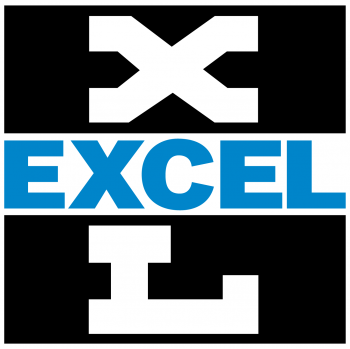
- Type: Privately held company
- Industry: Sanitation
- Founded: 1963; 63 years ago
- Headquarters: East Longmeadow, Massachusetts, United States
- Key people: Denis Gagnon (President)
- Products: hand dryers, including the ThinAir, Xlerator and XleratorECO
- Owner: Family owned
- Number of employees: 50 (2024)
- Website: www.exceldryer.com

Excel Dryer is an American manufacturer of hand dryers, based in East Longmeadow, Massachusetts. The company manufactures its dryers in the United States with most parts coming from U.S. suppliers.

== History ==
The company was originally founded in 1963, and built hand dryers from its factory in East Longmeadow.

In 1997, Denis Gagnon bought the company that he said "made products nobody liked". The company hired four scientists, three out of MIT, Sol Aisenberg, George Freedman, and Richard Pavelle to help them develop a new high speed hand dryer.

In 2001 the company launched their first high speed hand dryer, known as the Xlerator. In 2022, the company claimed that its machines could dry hands in just eight seconds compared to previous models that took 35-40 seconds.

Excel Dryer's products have been approved for Leadership in Energy and Environmental Design (LEED) v4 credits in the United States and other green building standards.

In 2015, Excel Dryer released a different hand dryer model called the ThinAir (TA-SB, or TA-ABS) and the Xlerator was modified with the New Controllers.

In 2018, Excel Dryer released a hand dryer that could be installed on top of a sink called XLERATORsync.
