= Hand dryer =

Electric hand-drying machine

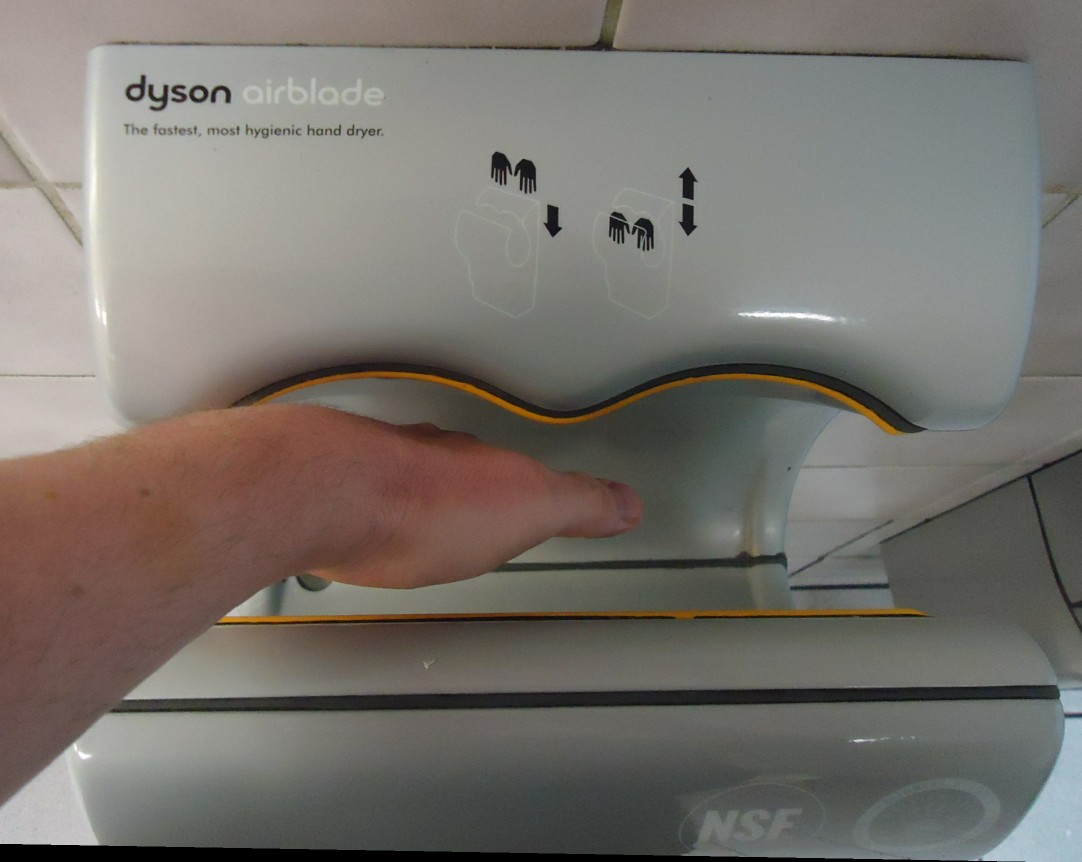
A Dyson Airblade hand dryer

A hand dryer is an electric machine designed to blow hot air onto freshly washed hands in order to dry them. Since 1922, hand dryers have been commonly used in public toilets around the world as a cost-effective alternative to paper towels. They may operate with the push of a button or automatically, using a sensor.

The hygienic suitability of hand dryers is disputed. Several studies attempted to emulate typical hand-drying conditions and found that hand dryers left more bacteria on the hands or in the nearby air compared to drying with paper towels. Several reviews found that the existing literature is inconclusive and depends on the details of the experimental implementation.

== History ==
The earliest hand dryer was patented on June 13, 1922, by R. B. Hibbard, D. J. Watrous and J. G. Bassett as a "dryer machine" for the Airdry Corporation of Groton New York. This machine was sold as a built-in model or freestanding floor unit that consisted of an inverted blower (much like a handheld blow dryer) that was controlled by a floor pedal. Known as "Airdry the Electric Towel", these units were used in restrooms, barbershops and factories. Airdry Corporation moved to Chicago and San Francisco in 1924 to centralize their distribution.

The hand dryer was later popularized in 1948 by George Clemens, who founded World Dryer and invented the Model A, World Dryer's flagship model. In 1993, Mitsubishi Electric introduced a new type of hand dryer "Jet Towel" that blows jets of air on both sides of the hand, pushing the water off rather than evaporating it.

== Effect on the environment ==
Due to the reduction in litter and waste in comparison with paper towels, which cannot be recycled, hand dryers are claimed to be better for the environment. By eliminating the need for paper towels, hand dryer manufacturers estimate that over five billion paper towels from over 200,000 trees per year can be saved. Another study shows that whereas the majority of the environmental impact of a hand dryer occurs during its use, the environmental impact of paper towels is predominantly in the material production and manufacturing stages. It is estimated that hand dryers use 5% less energy than paper towels in the first year, and 20% less over five years. A World Dryer study of 102 hand dryers installed in public schools in Topeka, Kansas, claimed annual savings of 34.5 tons of solid waste, 690,000 gallons of water, and 587 trees; another World Dryer study of 153 hand dryers in the Iowa state capitol showed an annual savings of 10.5 tons of solid waste and 176 trees. However, a Dutch study published in March 1995 indicated that there was environmental parity between hand dryers and paper towels as hand-drying methods when all factors were taken into consideration.

== Hygiene and health ==
Hand dryer in an Austrian rest area bathroom

The World Health Organization (WHO) and the Centers for Disease Control and Prevention both stress the importance of frequent and thorough hand washing followed by complete drying as a means to stop the spread of bacteria. Bacteria transmit more easily from wet skin than from dry skin. WHO recommends that everyone "frequently clean [their] hands" and "dry [them] thoroughly by using paper towels or a warm air dryer". The Centers for Disease Control and Prevention report that "both [clean towels or air hand dryers] are effective ways to dry hands".

Other research suggests paper towels are much more hygienic than the electric hand dryers found in many public toilets. In 2008, the University of Westminster conducted a study to compare the levels of hygiene offered by paper towels, warm-air hand dryers and the more modern jet-air hand dryers, with the sponsorship of the European Tissue Symposium (which represents the paper-towel industry). The key findings were:

- After washing and drying hands with the warm-air dryer, the total number of bacteria was found to increase on average on the finger pads by 194% and on the palms by 254%.
- Drying with the jet-air dryer resulted in an increase on average of the total number of bacteria on the finger pads by 42% and on the palms by 15%.
- After washing and drying hands with a paper towel, the total number of bacteria was reduced on average on the finger pads by up to 76% and on the palms by up to 77%.

The scientists also carried out tests to establish whether there was the potential for cross contamination of other public toilet users and the public toilet environment as a result of each type of drying method. They found that:

- The jet-air dryer, which blows air out of the unit at claimed speeds of 180 m/s (650 km/h; 400 mph), was capable of blowing microorganisms from the hands and the unit and potentially contaminating other users and the environment up to two metres away.
- Use of a warm-air hand dryer spread microorganisms up to 0.25 metres from the dryer.
- Paper towels showed no significant spread of microorganisms.

In a study conducted by TÜV Produkt und Umwelt GmBH from May 2004 to February 2005, different hand drying methods were evaluated. The following changes in the bacterial count after drying the hands were observed:

Drying method	Effect on Bacterial Count
Paper towels and roll	Decrease of 24%
Hot-air dryer	Increase of 117%

Another paper found that air dryers dispersed marker bacteria in a radius of three feet (one metre) and onto the investigator's laboratory coat. Another study found that hot air dryers had the capacity to increase the bacterial count on the skin, and that paper towel drying decreased skin bacterial count. This is corroborated by another study which found that the mechanical action of paper towel drying removed bacteria, something air dryers cannot do.

Doctors at the University of Ottawa claim that "the blowing of warm air may lead to an accelerated dehydration of the skin surface, thereby affecting the viability" of the microorganisms, and that the warm air may "penetrate all the crevices in the skin, whereas absorbent towels may not reach such areas, even though the skin appears dryer".

A review in 2012 concluded that "From a hygiene standpoint, paper towels are superior to air dryers; therefore, paper towels should be recommended for use in locations in which hygiene is paramount, such as hospitals and clinics." A 2014 study by Best et al. found that jet dryers aerosolized 27 times more bacteria than paper towels when measured in close proximity to drying hands. A 2020 review funded in part by Excel Dryer concluded that many existing studies were of insufficient quality to make a determination about the relative efficacy of hand dryers or paper towels.

== Noise ==
Some people object to the noise that hand dryers make. Typically, hand dryers produce over 80 decibels of sound at a distance of 10 ft (3.0 m) whilst they are in operation. It is much louder for the user and may exceed safety limits for people whose ears are at the height of the device. Some units, however, are designed to be quieter at the cost of drying speed.

The term aural diversity was coined following the findings of Prof. John Levack Drever's study of the noise impact of high-speed hand dryers and the inadequacy of policy and guidance of acoustics.

== Reception ==
Research conducted in 2008 indicated that European consumers much prefer hand towels over hand dryers in public washrooms: 63% of respondents said paper towels were their preferred drying method, while just 28% preferred a hand dryer. Respondents overwhelmingly considered paper towels to offer faster hand drying than electric hand dryers (68% vs 14%). On the whole they also considered paper towels to be the most hygienic form of hand drying in public washrooms (53% vs. 44%).

== See also ==
- Paper towel
- Towel
