= DC15 =

DC15 may refer to:

- OR Tambo District Municipality district code
- Dyson DC15, a 2005 vacuum cleaner by manufacturer Dyson
- 15th DEF CON 2007 hackers convention

DC-15 may refer to:

- DC-15 blaster rifle, a fictional weapon used by the Republic clone troopers in Star Wars
