= Ballbarrow =

Wheelbarrow variation

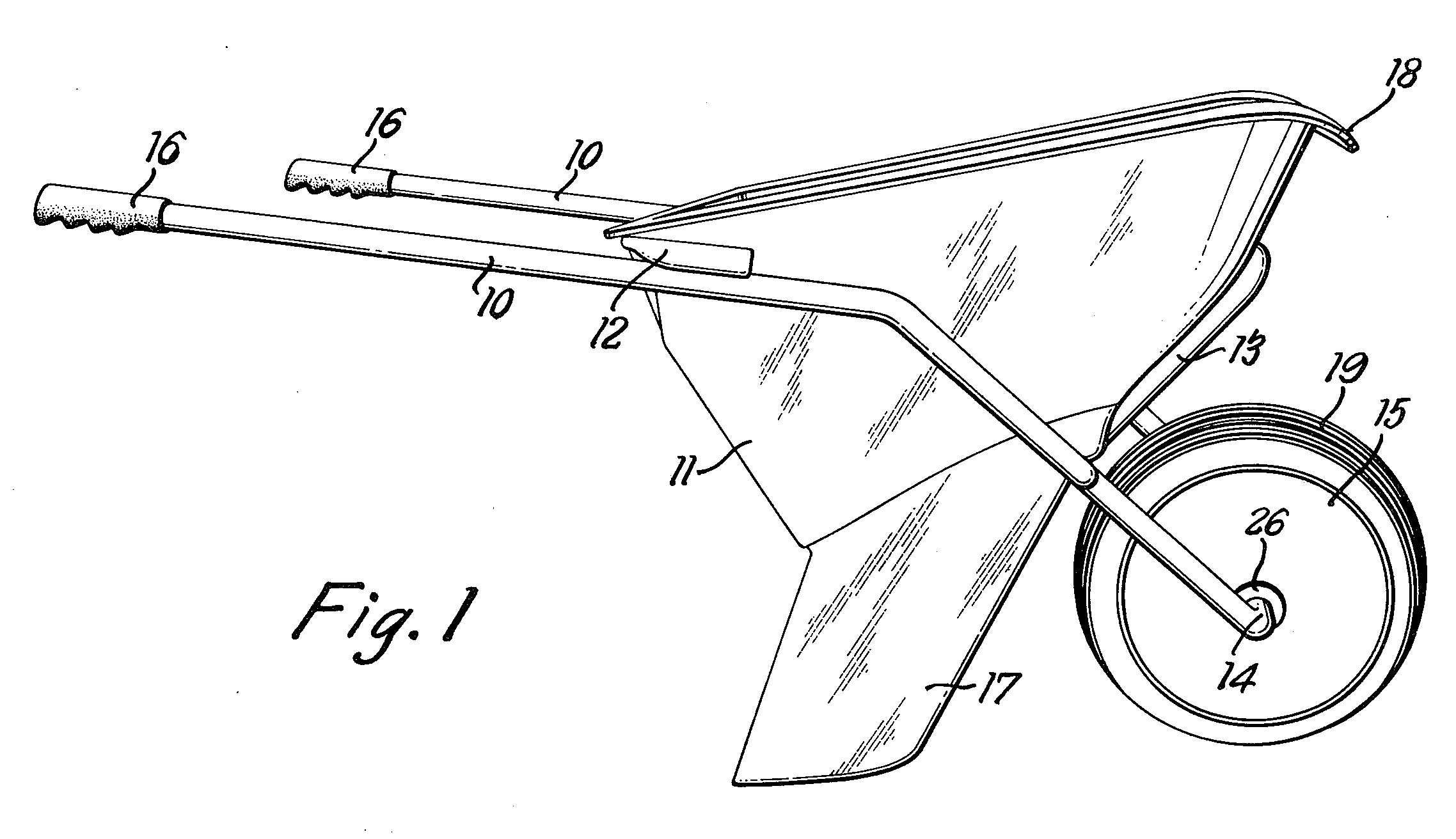
Diagram of a ballbarrow from James Dyson's 1977 patent

The Ballbarrow was a variation of the wheelbarrow design, by James Dyson released in 1974 in the UK. It featured a moulded plastic hopper on a steel frame and a spherical plastic wheel, allowing increased manoeuvrability. Dyson said that the surface area of the ball, larger than that of a conventional design, made the ballbarrow easier to use in soft soil and more laterally stable with heavy loads on uneven ground.

The original design featured a galvanised steel or copper hopper, forming integral rear legs. Conventional barrows use a bend in the frame to form these legs. Later the design was changed to a plastic hopper, with an optional clip on height-extension piece.

The Ballbarrow won the Building Design Innovation Award in 1977. Dyson continued with the ball-wheel concept in his design for the Trolleyball boat launcher in 1978, and the DC15 vacuum cleaner in 2005.

Dyson claimed his failure to maintain control of his invention by assigning the patent for the Ballbarrow to the company, and subsequently losing control over the company in the early 1970s, marked his biggest mistake in business.
