= List of Dyson products =

Dyson is a British-Singaporean company which manufactures bagless vacuum cleaners (using cyclonic separation and brushless electric motors), heatless hand dryers, bladeless fans/heaters, and robotic vacuum cleaners.

== Technology ==
Dyson has developed various basic technologies for use in their products, including designing and manufacturing its own specialized motors.

=== Dyson Digital Motor ===
The electric motor marketed as the Dyson Digital Motor (DDM) is a direct current motor, operating on the switched reluctance principle. These brushless motors rotate at up to 110,000 rpm. The motor used a two-pole brushless rotor with a digital controller. Dyson said its efficiency was 84%, which was less than the 96% efficiency that is achieved in some brushless designs. In order to deal with the high speed and centrifugal forces, the impeller is made of carbon fibre reinforced polymer; the shaft is steel.

The first mass-produced version was named "X020" and used in the Airblade hand dryer; the later DDM "V2" was used for Dyson handheld vacuum cleaners. Dyson has continued to develop its proprietary motor designs for various products, improving efficiency for increased battery life, and reducing acoustic noise, resulting in a "V8" version (for cordless vacuums) and a "V9" version (for a hair dryer), as of 2020.

=== Root Cyclone technology ===
The Dyson Root Cyclone technology is used in all Dyson vacuum cleaners from DC07 onward. The DC17, DC22, and DC23 use the improved "Root Cyclone & Core Separator", also called "Radix Cyclone", "Intermediary Cyclone", or "Level 3 Root Cyclone Technology".

Most of the current range use "2 Tier Radial cyclones", consisting of two cascaded levels of cyclonic separators to remove dirt and dust without requiring a bag or filter.

== Vacuum cleaners ==
=== Model names ===
Most versions are identified by a name such as "DC14". Later upright and cylinder cleaners have labels such as "Small Ball" or "Big Ball" which relate to the machine's form factor. Cordless vacuum cleaners are identified by names such as "V11" or "V7" which denote the version of the appliance (the higher the model number, the greater its specification). Older cordless models pre-dating the Dyson V6 have names in the "DC14" style.

Some have submodels identified by a suffix indicating specific facilities, implemented sometimes by additional tools supplied. Suffixes with the same meaning vary from model to model.

- All Floors, Multi Floor, Wood+Wool: suitable for both hard surfaces and carpets.
- Allergy: suitable for filtering out microscopic allergens.
- Animal: designed to pick up animal hair better than a general-purpose model, and filter out fine particles. Many, but not all of these machines come with a mini turbine tool to help remove pet hair, human hair and cotton fibres from upholstery, cars, and confined areas.
- Motorhead: cylinder or handheld model with direct-drive motorised brush head.
- Full Gear: same features as "Animal", with more attachments.
- Absolute: has a full range of tools and is typically the top-of-the-line model.

==== Special Edition models ====
Other suffixes may indicate exclusivity to certain stores, e.g. "Comet Exclusive" and "Overdrive" (Comet) or "Blitz it" (Currys).

Some are limited editions:

===== "Drawing" limited editions =====
These machines feature a different range of tools to the usual "Multifloor" and "Animal" versions and also appear in different colours. The Drawing later became exclusive to the British John Lewis Department Stores.

===== "De Stijl" limited editions =====
Some of the early Dyson models (DC01, DC02, DC04) were available in a "De Stijl" colour scheme of purple, red and yellow, in homage to the Dutch design movement of the same name.

===== "Dyson Antarctic Solo" limited editions =====
In 1996, 100,000 recoloured DC01 and DC02 models were produced as part of a fund-raising effort for Ranulph Fiennes's solo expedition to the Antarctic. For these models, the yellow parts found on the mainstream models were replaced with light blue ones, and on the DC02 Antarctic Solo the body was also recoloured in white instead of silver.

=== Current models ===
==== Upright ====
Model name	Launch year	Description
DC65/UP13/DC66	2014	The DC65 (DC66 in Canada)—is an update of the DC41. The vacuum features an updated root cyclone and a redesigned brush roll with more power than the DC41 and a better edge cleaning system. Some variants (like the Animal model) include the Tangle-Free Turbine Tool. Dyson has undergone a name change to their models, and this appears to be the same base design as the new UP13 model marketed as the "Dyson Ball Allergy". Boxes now contain new product code areas (which may make comparisons slightly easier) in the form [Model Type: UP = upright (previously codes were all DC)] [# ex: 13,19,20,40] [AC = ?] [Marketing description. OR = Origin, ALE = Allergy, AN = Animal, MF2 = Multi-Floor 2, ] [BMR = ?, SSE = ?, IRSY = ?, IRSPU = ?] [Country Code: US]
Small Ball (UP15)	2015	The Dyson Small Ball replaces the DC50 small upright in 2015, after the introduction of the EU 2014 directive on mains powered vacuum cleaners. It is very similar to the DC50, but with refinements to the motor performance, and also a change to the handle wand, which it became a metal wand as on the DC24 to address issues with excessive flexing of the all plastic handle on the DC50.
Cinetic Big Ball (DC75/DC77/UP14)	2015	The DC75 (DC77/UP14 in North America) is Dyson's upright version of the Cinetic vacuum. Contains Cinetic technology with lifetime filters as well as Dyson's auto-adjusting motorized brushroll. The lifetime filters were guaranteed within the 5-year warranty period.
Ball (DC41MK2/DC55)	2017	Updated / renamed version of the DC41MK2 and DC55. Also still known as the DC41 MK2 and also DC55 in certain retail outlets but simply as Dyson Ball from Dyson UK
Light Ball (UP22)	2017	The Dyson Light Ball (UP22) is the replacement for the DC40 (ERP) upright, and is similar to the DC40 ERP in many respects except that it has a totally redesigned powerhead, incorporating a direct-drive, large-diameter brushroll with an internal "epicyclic" geared motor, similar to the DC50 and Small Ball. The powerhead has three levels of suction controlled by a slider switch which opens and closes various valves and gates on the powerhead. It is rated at 700 W and 80 dB, in compliance with the EU regulations 2017 for mains-powered vacuum cleaners. The Light Ball also has a longer reach cable than the DC40 and different tools with the "quick release" red button system.
Ball 2 (UP24 in UK and UP20 in the US)	2017	Models designated "2" incorporate updates and improvements on the original model of their given locale. European models are compliant with the 2017 EU regulations for mains powered vacuum cleaners, and differ in design from non-EU models.

==== Canister ====
Model name	Launch year	Description
DC63	2014	DC63 is a line of small canister vacuums developed for Asian markets. It uses a Dyson Digital Motor V4 and has 2 Tier Radial Root Cyclones. It is sold in Japan with handle remote operation, a motorized brush bar, and a 'fluffy' hard floor tool.
Cinetic Big Ball (CY22)	2015	The Dyson Cinetic Big Ball canister vacuum features Dyson's new Cinetic technology with lifetime filters. The machine and filters are warrantied for 5 years of use.
Big Ball (CY23)	2015	The Dyson Big Ball (CY23) is a standard cyclonic model with washable filters. Almost identical in appearance to the Dyson Cinetic Big Ball cylinder model.
Cinetic Big Ball 2	2017	Models designated "2" incorporate updates and improvements on the original model. European models are compliant with the 2017 EU regulations for mains powered vacuum cleaners and differ in design from non-EU models.
Big Ball 2	2017	Models designated "2" incorporate updates and improvements on the original model. European models are compliant with the 2017 EU regulations for mains powered vacuum cleaners and differ in design from non-EU models.

==== Cordless ====
Model name	Launch year	Description
DC72	2015	For specific markets (e.g. Canada, Singapore, Continental Europe); based on the V6; very similar to the DC59.
V6 (SV03/SV04/SV05/SV09)	2015	The Dyson V6 range is the replacement for the DC59 handstick and DC58 handheld cordless vacuum cleaners. Powered by the Dyson digital motor V6. This power-dense motor uses digital pulse technology and a neodymium magnet to spin at up to 110,000 rotations per minute. Its small size means that the machines it powers can also be small, light and powerful. The Dyson brand, as well as various reviews, claim that the V6 can have up to a 20-minute run time. The Dyson V6 comes in many different models with varying tools and accessories, including the Dyson Fluffy hard floor roller motorised head, and its top of the range model, the V6 Absolute comes with full HEPA filtration and a 50 W main powerhead, giving 150% more brushbar power than the standard 20 W powerhead found on lower models. Some versions of the V6, such as the Animal Extra and the Total Clean come with a 35 W main powerhead with 75% more brushbar power than the standard head. The V6 develops 28 Airwatts of suction in its extended runtime mode, and 100 Airwatts of suction in its MAX mode, but runtime on a full charge in MAX mode is limited to 6 minutes. Runtime on a full charge using extended run time mode is 20 minutes with the non-motorised tools attached, and 15 – 17 minutes with the motorised heads attached. The V6 has been an immensely successful machine for Dyson, but did have issues such as a short runtime, a small dust cup capacity and less than easy dust cup removal, which were all addressed with the next generation of cordless models, the V8 and V7 ranges, which replaced the V6.
V8 (SV10/SV25)	2016	The Dyson V8 is an upgraded version of the V6 with better battery life (up to 40 mins without the brush heads), a larger dust cup capacity, modifications to the debris emptying process (Called the "Hygienic dirt ejection system"), and reported quieter operation than its predecessor due to a different noise frequency and noise dampening post motor HEPA filter. The V8 produces 22 Air watts of suction on normal (extended runtime) power (28 on the V6) and 115 airwatts in MAX mode (100 on the V6). Their motorized floor heads are driven by their own separate motors, which are a 50 W main motorised powerhead with nylon and carbon fibre filaments for carpet use and hard floor dusting, a 20 W "Fluffy" soft roller head for hard floor cleaning, and a 20 W mini motorised head, with nylon bristles. Runtimes of the V8 in extended run time mode are 40 minutes with non motorised tools attached, 30 minutes with the fluffy head or mini motorised head attached, and 25 minutes with the main 50 W powerhead attached. In MAX mode, the run times are approximately 7 minutes regardless of what tools are fitted. The V8 has full HEPA filtration provided by a removable and washable HEPA exhaust filter located on the back of the motor housing. The HEPA filter system was carried over from the V6 Absolute. The V8 also has a washable pre-motor filter so theoretically no filter replacements should be necessary during the life of the machine. The battery on the V8 is replaceable if necessary.
V7 (SV11)	2017	Based on the design and overall look of the Dyson V8, the V7, which was launched in 2017, uses a similar digital motor and accessories. However, being a less expensive model to purchase, it has some differences to the higher priced V8. The battery can only run the V7 for up to 30 minutes on a full charge, whereas the V8 can run for up to 40 minutes. The V7 is equipped with a 35 W main motorised powerhead, compared to one with 50 W on the V8, and also some models of V7 come with a 20 W mini electric turbo tool of a slightly differing design to that of the V8. As it has a physically smaller battery than the V8, the V7 weighs less than the V8. In terms of performance, the V7 produces 21 Airwatts of suction on "extended run time" mode, compared to 22 on the V8 and 28 on the V6, and it produces 100 Airwatts (as on the V6) on Max mode, compared to 115 airwatts on the V8. Most models of V7 do not come equipped with a HEPA removable exhaust filter. Like the V8, the V7 incorporates the hygienic dirt ejection system, and the quick-release "red button" tools system, and it also has the same, larger dust cup capacity of the V8. It also, like the V8, runs for up to 7 minutes, when put in Max mode.
V8 Carbon Fiber	2017	The Dyson V8 Carbon Fiber is an upgrade version of V8 with a much more powerful motor. The V8 Carbon Fiber produces 155 AW (115 AW on the original V8) in MAX mode. The battery is rated at 40 minutes (same as original V8) in the normal mode.
V10 (SV12/SV13/SV27)	2018	The Dyson V10, launched in March 2018, is a successor to the V8. It implements a faster motor, larger bin capacity, "point and shoot" hygienic bin emptying system, and a single "all in one" washable filter consisting of both the pre-motor and post motor filter. It has 3 motor speeds, selectable via a pushbutton. There are two distinct models of the V10 with different motors, filter assemblies and bin sizes. The V10 with larger bin produces 15.8 airwatts on low speed, the medium speed gives 33 airwatts, and the maximum speed gives 151 airwatts of suction. Run times are extended up to 60 minutes for ECO (low power) mode, and 5 minutes in MAX (high power) mode. A smaller version of the V10 with a V8-sized bin implements a different motor with lower power, as well as a smaller filter assembly. Like the V8, it has a wall mounted charging dock and shares the same motorised floor head architecture. Prior to its release, Dyson announced that they were ceasing developing new corded vacuum models, this was also mentioned on Dyson's official website.
V11 (SV14/SV15/SV17/SV28)	2019	The Dyson V11 was released on 27 March 2019, sharing many of the components of the V10 with an upgraded motor and fan. The V11 lineup includes the V11 Animal, Torque Drive, and Absolute models. It uses current sensors to automatically adjust power to the floor type. The Torque Drive, Absolute, and Outsize models have LCD screens that show the remaining run time at the current power level.
V11 Outsize (SV16/SV29)	2020	Dyson launched an additional V11 model in November 2020, the Outsize, which has increased bin capacity and a larger frame. It includes a wider floor head and produces greater airflow and suction than previous models.
V12 Slim (SV20/SV30)	2020	Dyson revealed the new Digital Slim vacuum for Asian markets in August 2020, which is both smaller and lighter than the V11.
V15 Detect (SV22)	2021	The V15 Detect was announced on 24 March 2021. The main feature of the model is its laser detect technology, a small laser that can detect hidden dust particles as small as 10 microns on hard surfaces. It also includes a piezo detector which enables the user to see the amount and size of particles collected displayed on a LCD screen and the remaining battery life displayed in a real time countdown.
Gen5Detect (SV23)	2022	Dyson's Gen5Detect is equipped with a fifth-generation Hyperdymium motor with neodymium magnets, 135,000 revolutions per minute, with a strong suction output of up to 262AW, becoming Dyson's first floor-cleaning product that has been proven to capture and lock viruses.
Gen5Outsize (SV24)	2023	The Gen5outsize™ includes all the same pioneering technology of the Gen5detect™, with a 150% bigger bin, 25% wider cleaner head and double the run time designed to clean large homes.
V16 Piston Animal (SV53)	2025	
Omni-glide	2021	
PencilVac	2025	

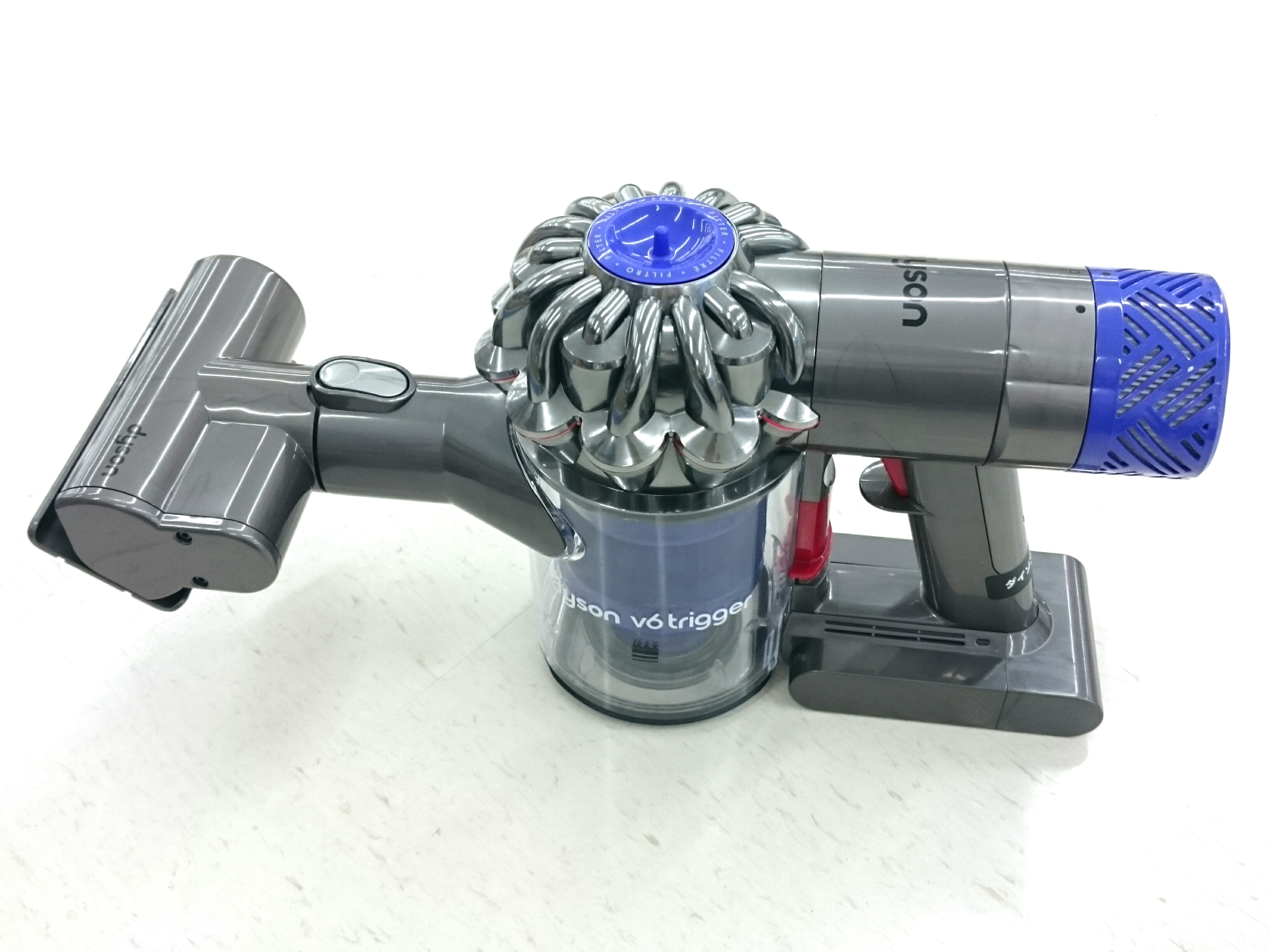
Dyson V6 with an attached-mini motorised head. All Dyson handheld/handsticks have similar, but not identical, main bodies.

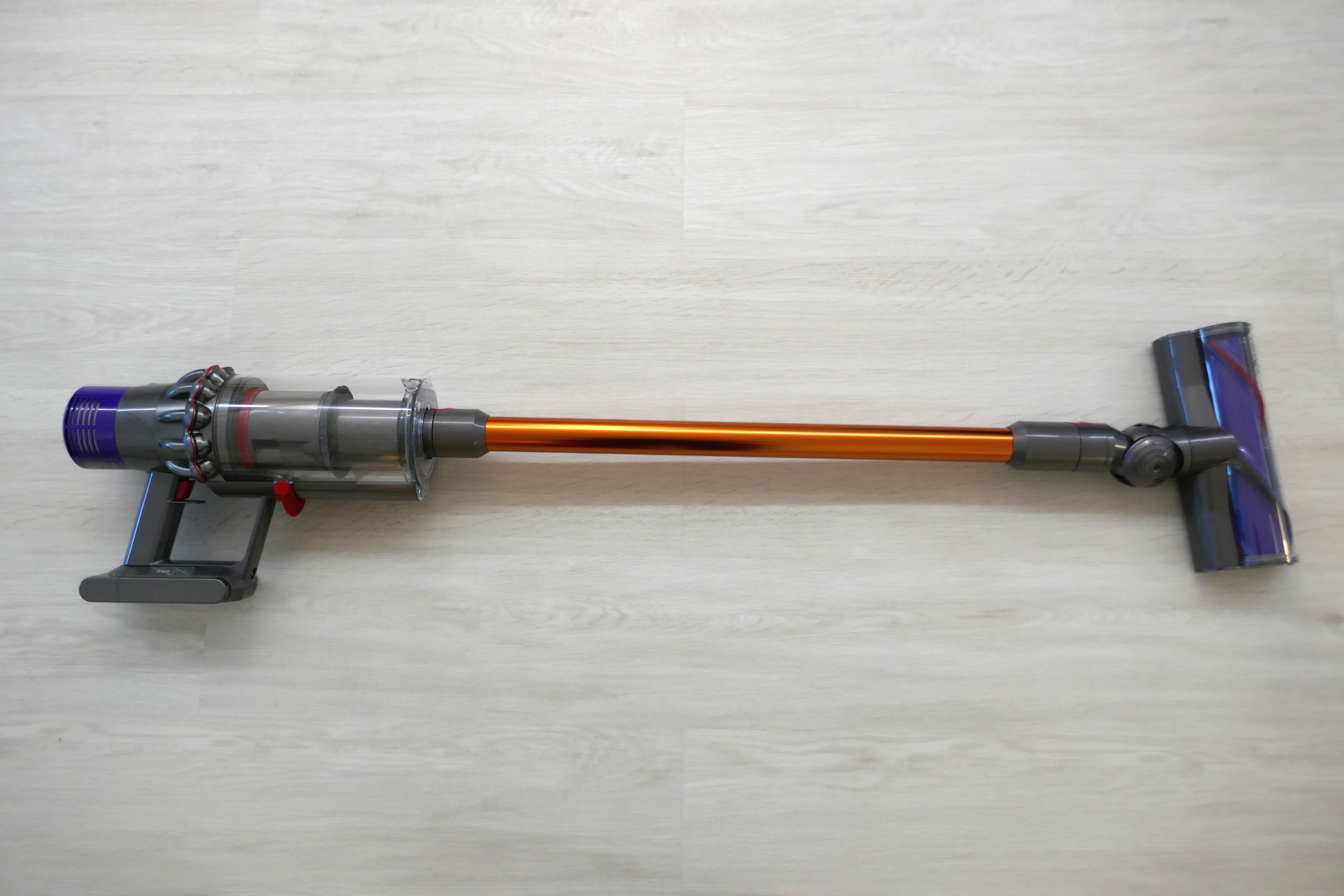
Dyson V10

==== Robot Vacuums ====
Model name	Launch year	Description
360 Eye	2014	The Dyson 360 Eye, a floor cleaning robot, uses a 360° panoramic vision sensor and IR distance sensors to map a room and navigate, enabling it to perform a systematic cleaning pattern that covers the accessible floor area only once. Based on the DC06, the 360 Eye was launched in 2014, Dyson's initial entry into this market segment also features cyclonic dust separation, a Dyson digital motor V2 for high power suction, tank treads for traction, a full-width brush-bar, and user interface via a free iOS or Android app.
360 Heurist	2019	The 360 Heurist is the upgraded version of the 360 Eye. The Heurist, released in summer of 2019, has a better navigation system, and now includes an LED light ring so this camera-based bot can be used in dark rooms.
360 Vis Nav	2023	The Dyson 360 Vis Nav is a robot vacuum cleaner that was released in May 2023. It has a 360-degree vision system that uses time-of-flight sensors and a camera to map the home and navigate intelligently. It also has a full-width brush bar, a piezo sensor, a HEPA filter, a long-lasting battery, and a smart app. It is an upgraded version of the Dyson 360 Heurist, which was launched in 2018. One of the main improvements of the Dyson 360 Vis Nav over the Dyson 360 Heurist is its lower profile. The Dyson 360 Vis Nav can clean under furniture up to 99 mm in height, easily navigating under and around obstacles. The Dyson 360 Heurist, on the other hand, had a height of 120 mm and could not reach some low-clearance areas. The lower profile of the Dyson 360 Vis Nav also makes it more aesthetically pleasing and less bulky.

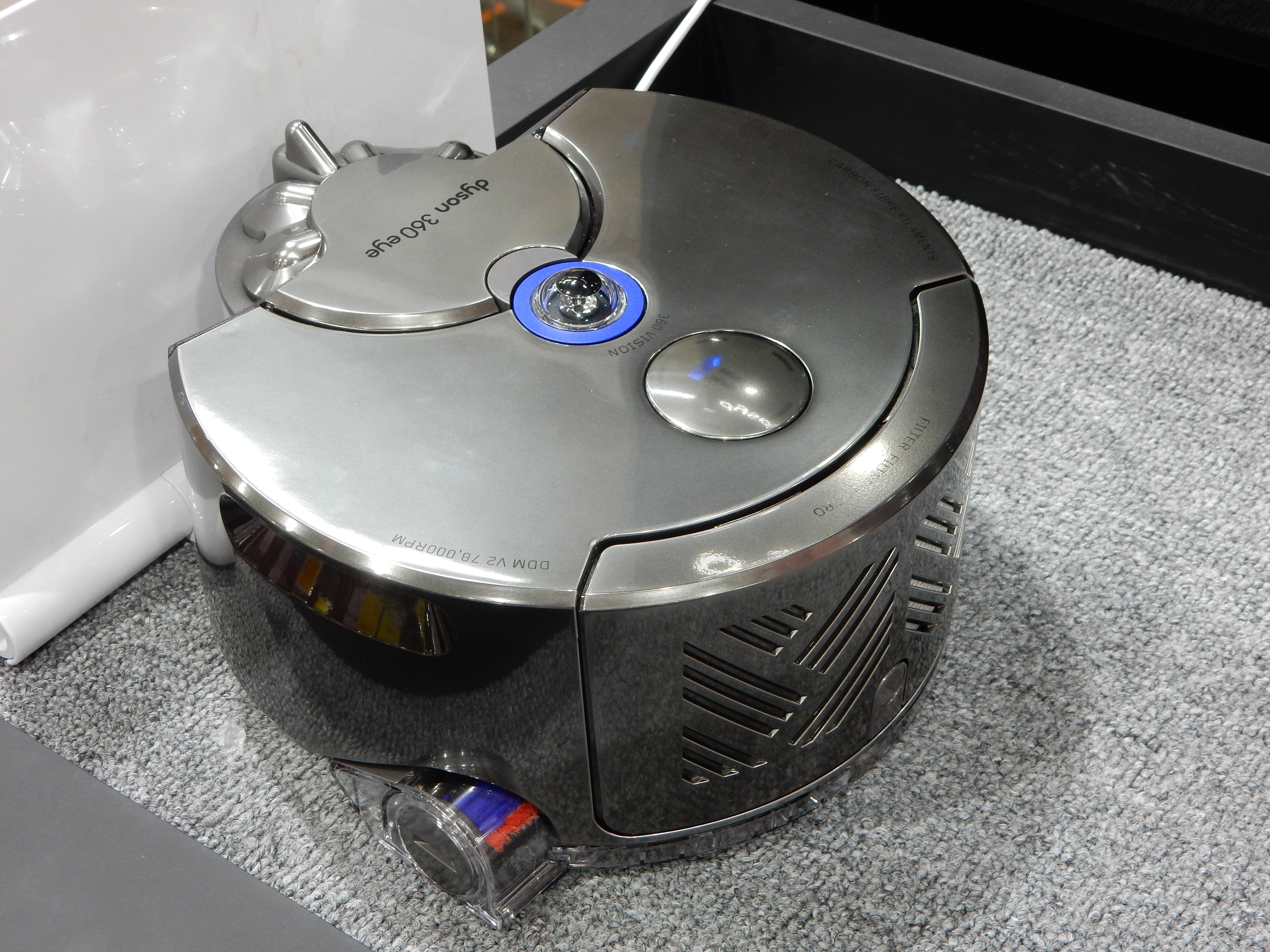
Dyson 360 Eye

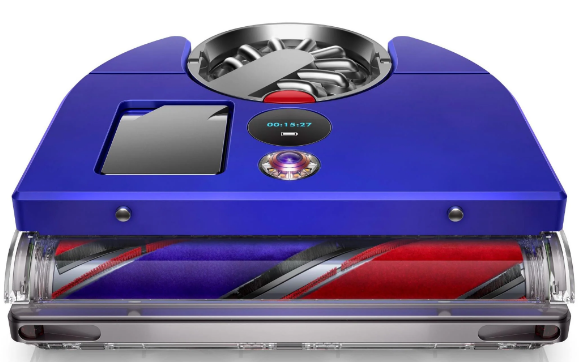
Dyson 360 Vis Nav

=== Discontinued models ===
==== Upright ====
Model name	Launch year	Description
G-Force	1983	"G-Force" was the name given to Dyson's first widely available vacuum cleaner. It was the first to use "Dual Cyclone" separation technology. Licensed to the Japanese company Apex Inc., and only available on the Japanese market, it was not sold under the Dyson name. Dyson used the money he earned from G-Force to start up the Dyson company.
DC01	1993	The first vacuum cleaner sold under the Dyson name was the DA001, launched in May 1993. It was a domestic upright model that used the patented "Dual Cyclone" technology and was made in Chippenham, England. After a short period, it was renamed the DC01 and production later moved to Malmesbury, at the company's new factory/research centre. The DC01 had a single motor which provided the suction and also drove the brushroll directly via a single rubber toothless belt with no form of "brush control" (where the user can turn off the brushroll for use on hard floors), so was mainly designed to use on carpeted floors. It stored its hose on the back of the housing as part of the handle wand, and removing the handle wand enabled this stretch hose to be used. This was the only Dyson upright not to use washable pre-motor filters; these had to be purchased and replaced every three months. It also had a choice of post motor filtration – standard or HEPA (High Efficiency Particle Arrest) according to the model purchased. It competed with models like the Hoover Turbopower, and was priced very high in comparison to other bagged cleaners. The suction power of the DC01 is 90 airwatts. Dyson no longer supports this model, nor produces parts for it.
DC03	1997	The DC03, Dyson's second upright vacuum cleaner, released in 1997, was a lightweight (6.9 kg (15 lb), low profile upright cleaner. It resembled a twin-cylinder version of the DC01, contained one normal cylinder and a second which contained a pair of HEPA filters. The DC03 had a smaller, more compact 700 W motor, and while its suction power was lower than any of the currently available uprights at around 100 Airwatts, its heavy-duty filtration system allowed it to survive for many years after the rest of the original Cyclone cleaners were discontinued. It was the first upright model to feature brush control, via a clutch between the motor and the brushroll, and was able to be stored hung on a wall. It was also the first Dyson to have the Reversible Hose, like on the DC07 and DC24 Ball
DC04	1998	The DC04, released around 1998, had improved filters fitted as standard. The pre-motor filter was washable and was relocated to the top of the cyclone assembly, and the tools stored on the top of the filter housing. Most models also featured the new clutch controlled brushroll bar introduced on the DC03.
DC07	2001	The DC07, released in 2001 was the first implementation of Root Cyclone technology into a cleaner. In features it was similar to the DC04, but included a bottom drop bin, controlled by a trigger in the top of the cyclone housing, which made for easier emptying, and the handle wand was also able to be reversed and fitted to the hose cuff at the handle, so making it easier to use than that on the DC04. Many models were fitted with clutch controlled brushbars. The DC07 had a new 1400 W motor that provided 280 Airwatts, making it about the most powerful model that Dyson made, and also the noisiest in use, with much of the operating noise coming from the upwards mounted cyclone assembly. It weighed 9 kg (20 lb). The DC07 had a long production run from 2001 until 2008, and came in many different colour combinations. During the DC07 production run, in 2002, Dyson switched all manufacturing of its vacuum cleaners from Malmesbury, UK to a new factory in Malaysia.
DC14	2004	The DC14 was released in 2004. It is a revision of the DC07 upright vacuum cleaner with lower centre of gravity and 'telescope reach'. It uses Dyson's Root 8 Cyclone technology, which maintains constant suction. Aside from the different design of the cyclone assembly and bin, the DC14 looks very similar to the DC07. It also has the same motor as fitted to the DC07 and the same floorhead (with the exception that the DC14 has a large debris channel fitted to the front of the brushroll housing). Due to the different downwards pointing cyclone design, the DC14 was slightly quieter in operation than the DC07 was, but still had the familiar motor noise as it used the same 1400 watt motor. Like the DC07, the DC14 comes in many variants, the standard DC14 (the Origin, non clutched), the All Floors (Clutched), the Allergy (Clutched), the Animal (Clutched, + mini turbine tool) and other special editions and colourways. As of January 2012 listed as "End of Line" on Dyson Web site.
DC15	2005	The DC15, known as The Ball was released in 2005 in three variants, the DC15 All Floors, Allergy and Animal, and is loosely based on the DC14. It was the first vacuum to use a ball instead of existing static wheels, so as to make it more possible to steer and maneuver the cleaner around obstacles and corners, in conjunction with a universal joint mechanism on the cleaner head, by twisting the handle to the right or left. The inspiration of the "Ball" system originated from the Ballbarrow, James Dyson's first invention. The DC15 is a complex machine compared to earlier upright models, and is the first Dyson upright with an independent motorised brushroll, controlled by a switch next to the main power switch. The main suction motor is housed inside the "ball". Due to its high launch price, its weight (8.6 kilograms (19 lb)), and the fact that it may have initially been seen as a gimmick, not that many DC15s were sold, with the cheaper DC14 remaining much more popular. The lightweight DC18 was launched late the following year, addressing the DC15's biggest criticism, its heavy weight.
DC17	2006	The Dyson DC17 is an upright cleaner launched in October 2006 in the US. Although visually similar to the DC14, it contains new technologies. The first upgrade is the use of Dyson's Level 3 Root Cyclone. This system incorporates 11 cyclones to more efficiently filter sand and dust particles out of the airstream. In this system, the airflow travels from the low speed outer cyclone to two intermediate cyclones that filter out the bulk of dust and sand particles that are drawn into the system. Beyond that, the airflow flows through the remaining eight high speed cyclones which filters any remaining dust particles out of the airstream. The Level 3 Root Cyclone improves upon the original Root Cyclone system with its capability to more efficiently separate sand particles from the air flow, a problem with the earlier system. The second change with the DC17 upright is the brushroll design. While the brushrolls used on the DC07, DC14 and DC15 were designed with European carpets in mind, the DC17's brush roll was designed for North America with a cylindrical shape, a large diameter, and short stiff bristles. A separate motor drives the brushroll, unlike the DC07 and DC14, which use power from the main motor via clutches. This made the DC17 the most effective of Dyson cleaners on carpeting. The third change is a new colour scheme for the DC17, and also the Dyson DC16 Root 6 Handheld; the bright colours and silver tones are toned down in favour of shiny metallic accents and titanium as the main colour for the entire machine. The level 3 root cyclone system on the DC17 was quietly redesigned due to a gasket defect that allowed dirt to enter the cyclones backwards, clogging them and causing the cleaner to lose suction; almost all of the original DC17s had this problem. The redesigned cyclone pack, fitted to later DC17s, resolved this issue. Older DC17s were not recalled, but Dyson gave out and sold many of the redesigned cyclone packs.
DC18	2006	The 6.6 kilograms (15 lb) Dyson DC18 Slim, launched in September 2006 and produced until summer 2008, is a slimmer and lighter-weight successor of the DC15 Ball upright. The DC18's Root Cyclone system has been trimmed down to better accommodate the machine's slimmer profile; the DC15 uses 8 cyclones, the DC18, 6. The ball design has been simplified for the DC18: rather than riding on a large ball that encloses the primary motor, the DC18 rides on a thin, cigar-shaped roller that provides more space for separate motor enclosure and airway paths.
DC24	2008	A small version of the DC25. Also uses ball technology with separate brushroll motor. It weighs 5.4 kilogrammes (11.9 pounds) and has 115 airwatts of suction power. It is small and compact, and the handle compacts further for easy storage. It appeals to people who prefer a lightweight cleaner. Like the DC25, this model has proved to be a big seller, due to its extremely compact size, but did have quality issues with the brushroll motors, some of which have failed prematurely. Was superseded by the DC50 in November 2012
DC25	2008	The DC25 was the replacement for the DC18, and was a scaled down, smaller version of the DC15 ball, and a larger version of the DC24. It was replaced by the DC41 in 2011. Like the DC15, it featured a suction motor located inside the ball, and separate brushroll motor which could be switched on and off independently of the suction motor, for using the vacuum cleaner on hard floors. It featured a post motor filter also inside the ball.
DC27	2009	The DC27 is an update on the DC14. The DC27 is a full size upright which has wheels rather than a ball, an auto-adjusting cleaner head and "root-cyclone" technology. It also features an extending wand and hose and has a large debris channel to pick up large dirt particles.
DC28	2009	This was another upright model produced for the US market. It was the replacement for the DC17. Has a powered cam to adjust the height of the brushbar ("Dyson Airmuscle") controlled from a set of buttons by the main power switch above the cyclone assembly, a pneumatic actuator to keep the cleaning head on the floor, and a high-torque clutch to give extra power to the brushbar.
DC33	2010	Revised version of the DC27/DC28. Replacement for the DC14, upright wheeled cleaner that does not use ball technology. Available as Multi Floor (Yellow), Stubborn (White), Animal (Purple), i (Red). The DC33 has a plastic telescopic pole with smaller diameter than the metal telescopic pole of the DC14, so attachments from older Dyson's such as the DC14 do not fit the DC33. This model more closely resembles the old DC14 than the DC27 did, using exactly the same style of floorhead as the DC14, DC07 and DC04. The plastic wand pole has been criticised as a lowering of quality from the older metal type, and also causes the main spine of the cleaner to flex more, without the support of the metal wand. The fact that older model's tools were not interchangeable was also criticised, with many buyers trading up from the DC07 or DC14 to the DC33, and finding that their old tools would not fit. The DC33 uses a single motor for the suction and to drive the brushroll via a mechanical clutch as on the DC04, DC07 and DC14. This unit has been discontinued as of July 2013. No replacement model has been announced. In mainland Europe, the DC33c is a cylinder machine known as the "Allergy Musclehead".
DC40	2012	The Dyson DC40 upright vacuum released in early 2012. The DC40 vacuum is Dyson's counterpart to the previously released DC41 Animal. The DC40 has Multifloor and Animal editions that utilise the Dyson ball technology. In 2015, following the introduction of the 2014 EU regulations, the DC40 was slightly modified to its powerhead and motor, whereby the motor was re-rated 700 W, and the powerhead gained much more aggressive agitation and had the carpet guard strips removed. The DC40 (ERP) was replaced in 2017 by the Dyson Light Ball.
DC41	2011	The Dyson DC41 upright released in late 2011 as the replacement for the DC25, is the first upright vacuum with Dyson's new Radial Root Cyclone technology as well as an automatic height adjuster which provides the maximum amount of power in the suction head. The cleaner also has Dyson's new high-powered turbo brush for the hose. The DC41 uses ball technology. In 2015, the DC41 was updated to become the DC41 MK2, in which it was made compliant with the new 2014 EU directives for mains powered vacuum cleaners, and its motor changed to a 700 W rated motor, and its powerhead was revised to take into account its lower powered suction motor. The DC41 MK2 was later renamed simply the "Dyson Ball", but is still known as DC41 MK2 in certain retail stores.
DC42	unknown	A version of the Dyson DC40 offered for sale in Canada.
DC43	unknown	A version of the Dyson DC41 offered for sale in Canada.
DC50	2012	The DC50 was released at the end of 2012, and is an update on the DC24. It is a very small and lightweight upright ball cleaner incorporating the technologies introduced on the DC41 (i.e. self-adjusting brushroll), plus the addition of a new brushroll motor mounted inside the brushroll to save on space. The brushroll also incorporates carbon fibre bristles found in the DC35 and DC44 models. It weighs 5.4 kg (12 lb) and has a suction rating of 140 airwatts, with a dirt capacity of 0.8 litres. Also featuring the 2 tier radial cyclone system found on the DC47. In Canada it is called the DC51. In 2015, the DC50 was renamed the "Small Ball" and underwent a few minor changes.
DC51	2012	The Dyson DC51 Was released in 2012 alongside the DC50 And was mainly sold in other countries.
DC55	unknown	Currys (UK) Exclusive model. Same as the Dyson Ball and DC41 MK2 but with extra tools and a red colour on the cyclone bins. ***Taken off shelves in 2018 due to its non-compliance with the maximum allowable noise level set by the EU in Sep 2017.

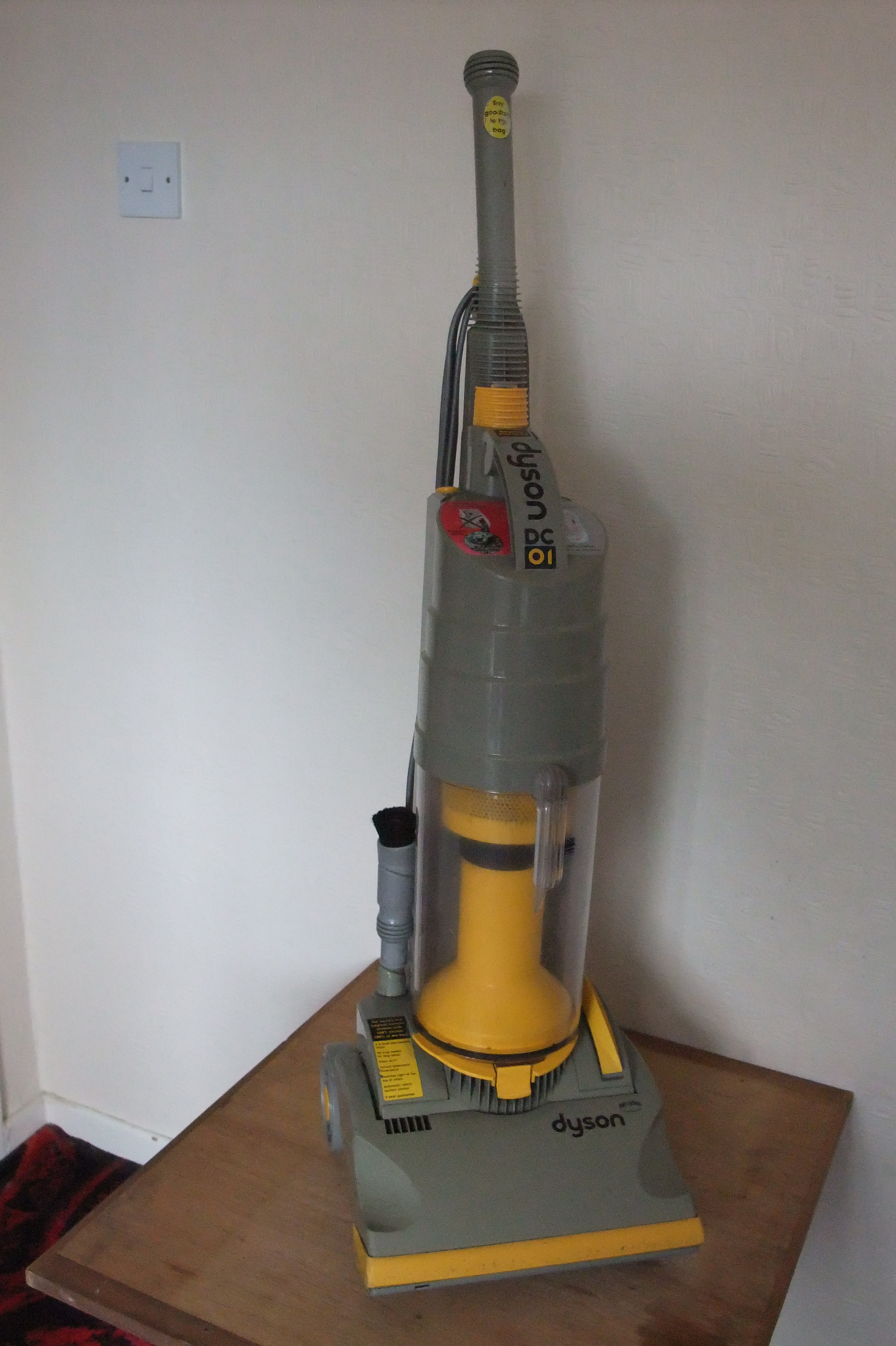
Dyson DC01

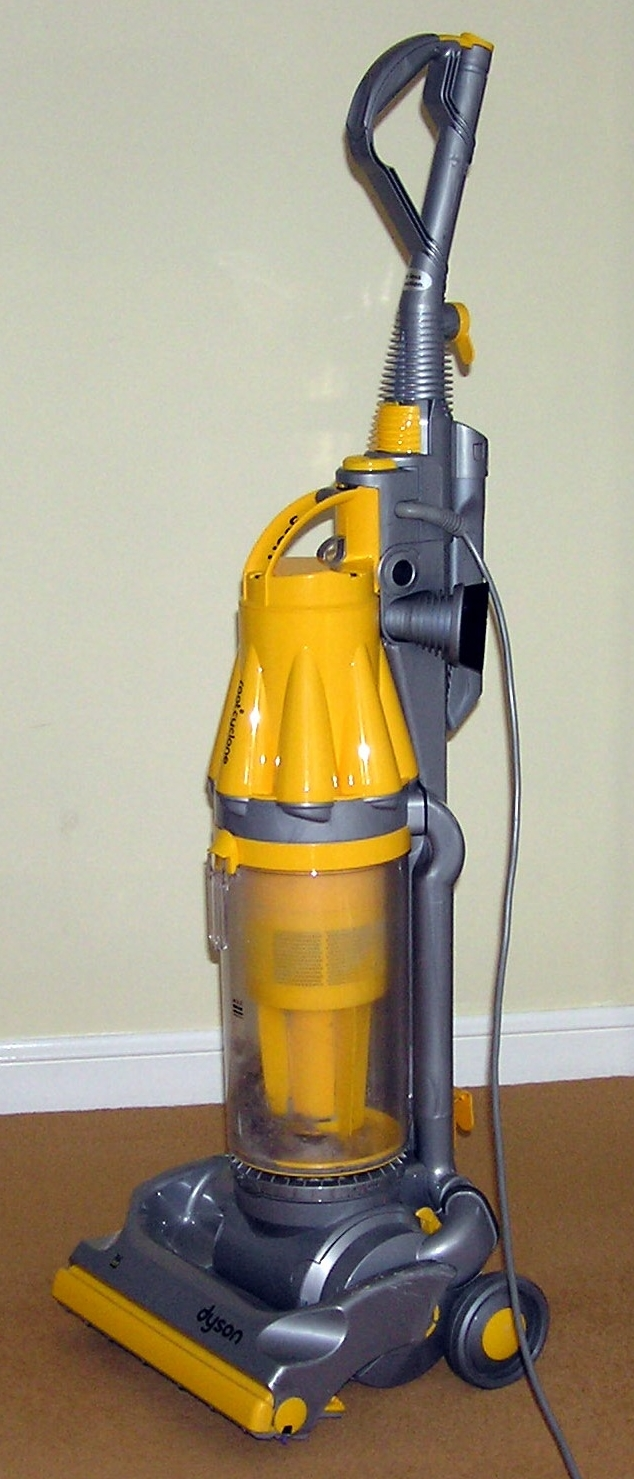
Dyson DC07

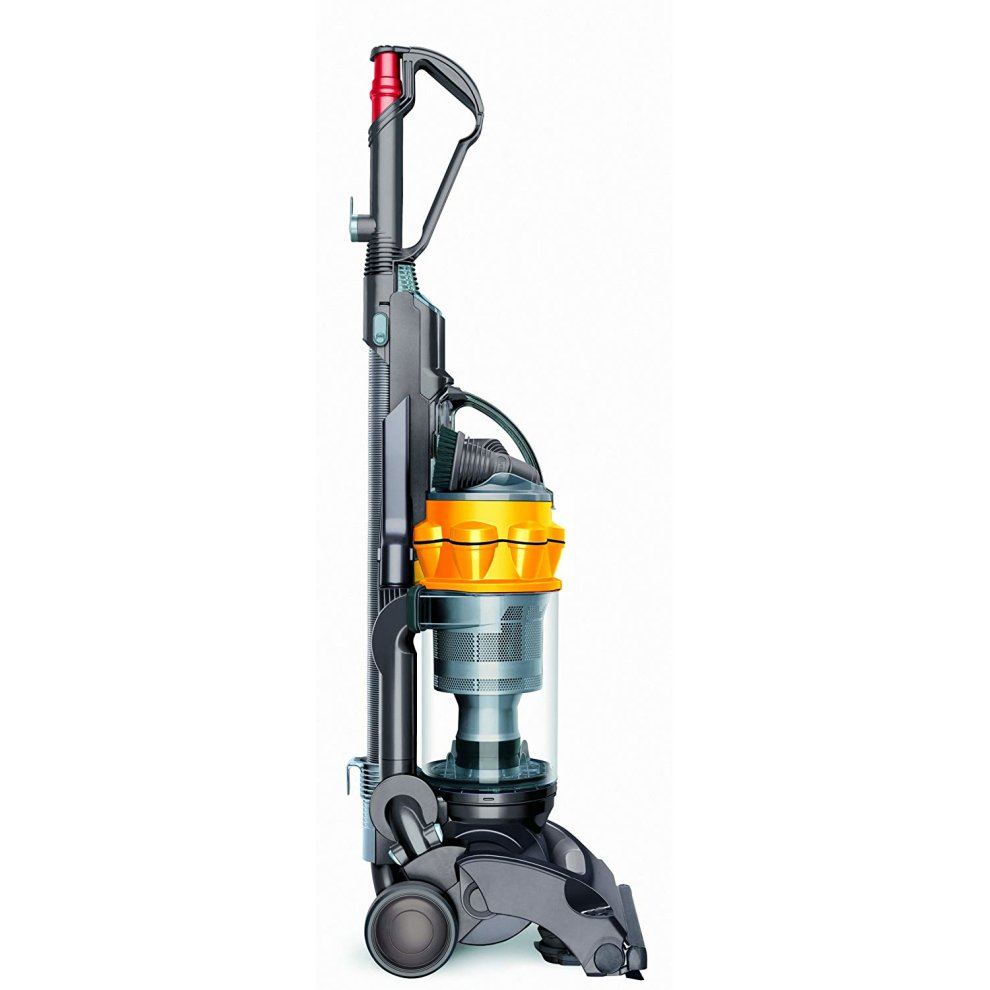
Dyson DC14

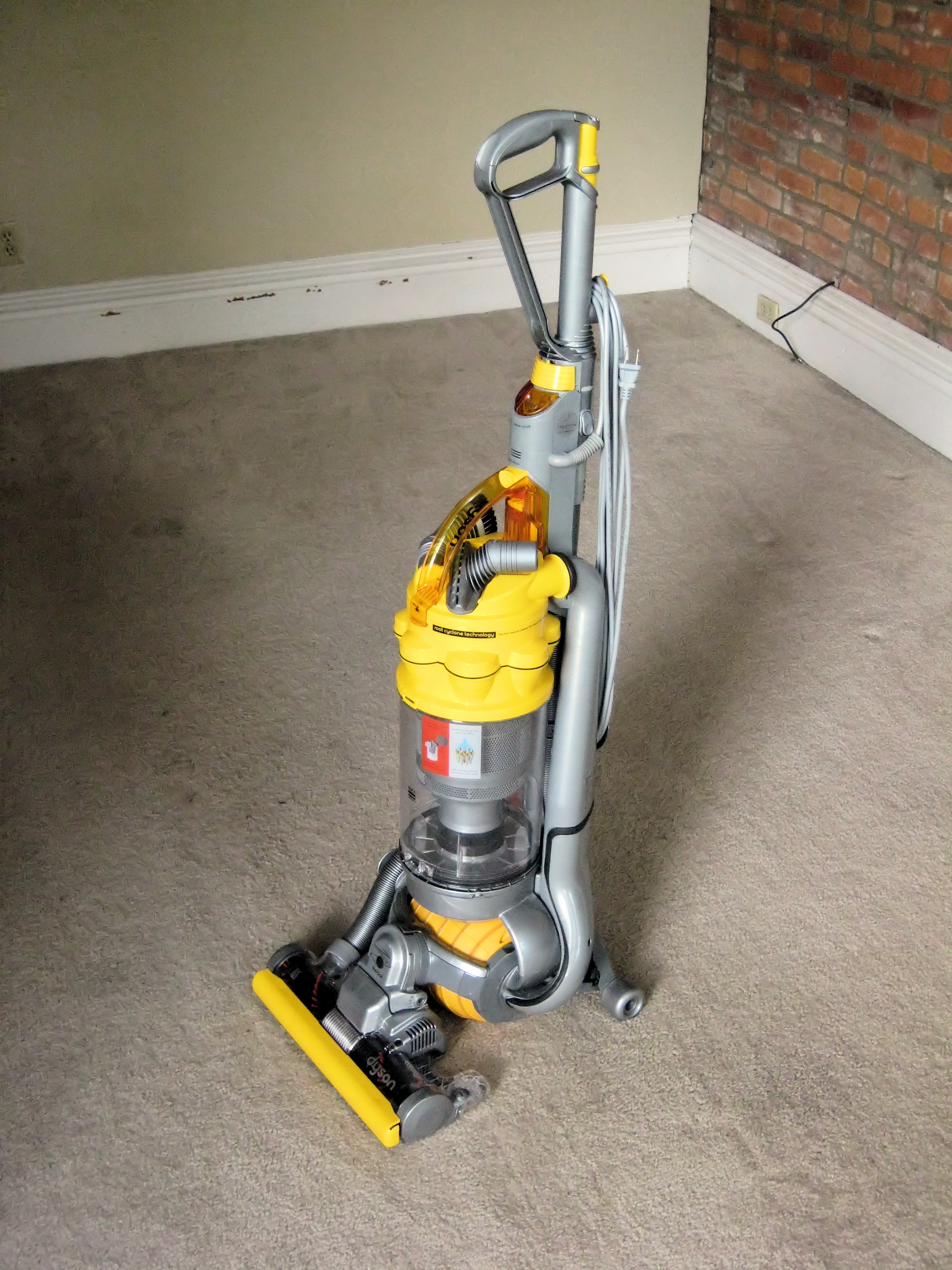
Dyson DC15

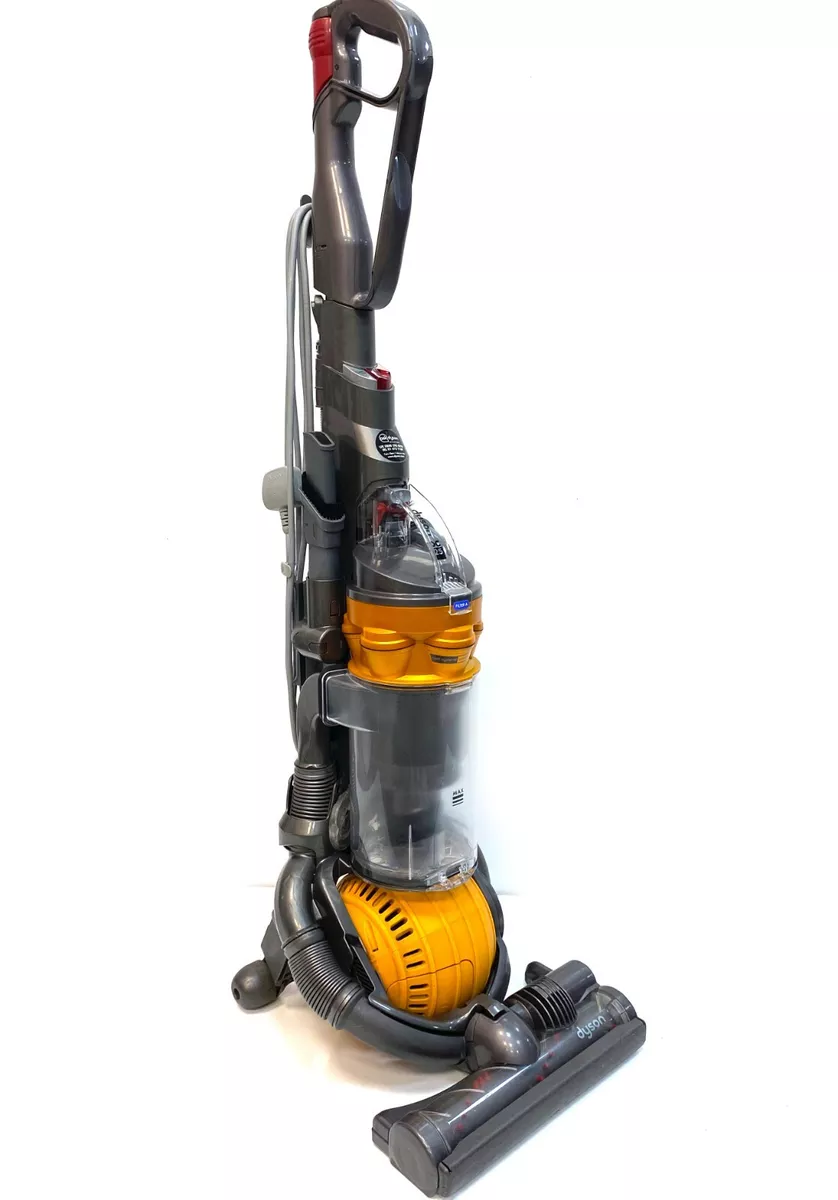
Dyson DC25

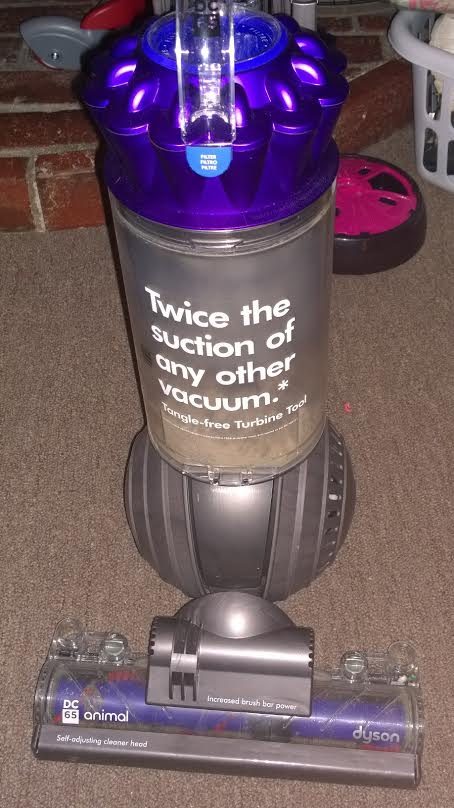
Dyson DC41

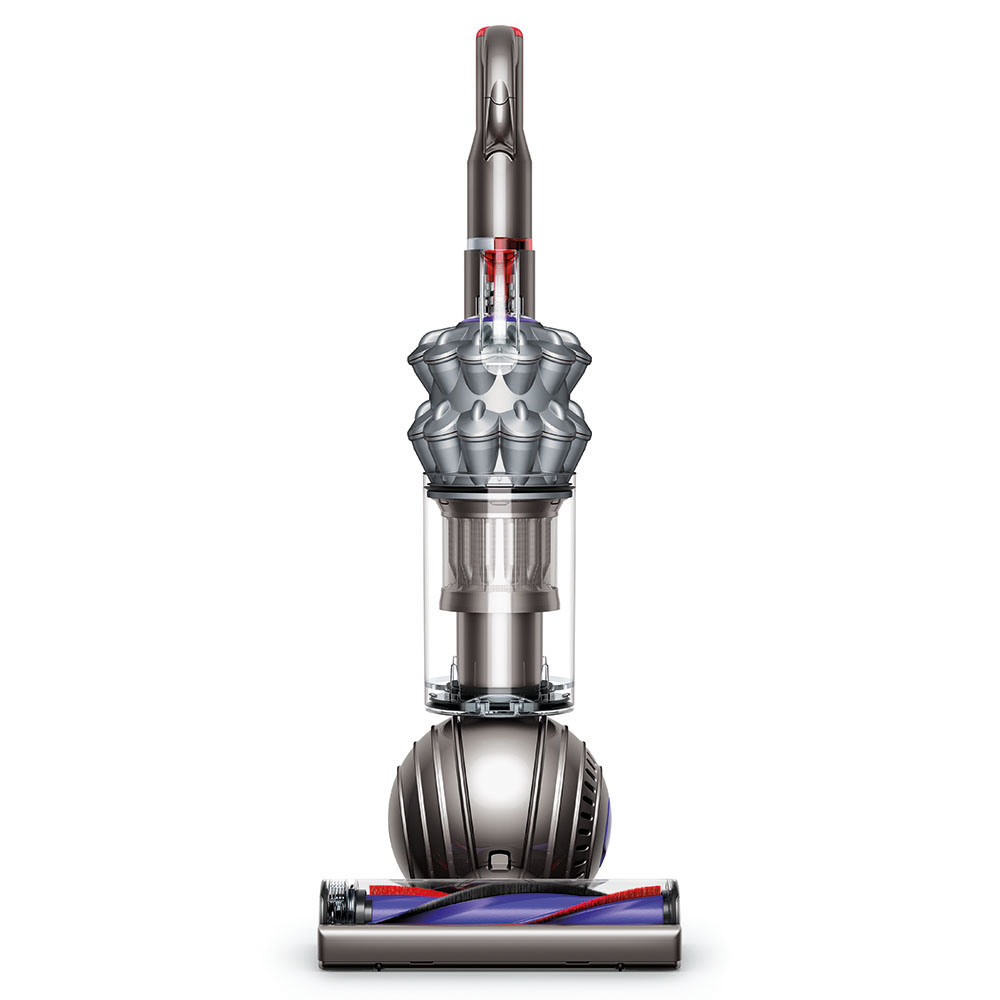
Dyson DC51

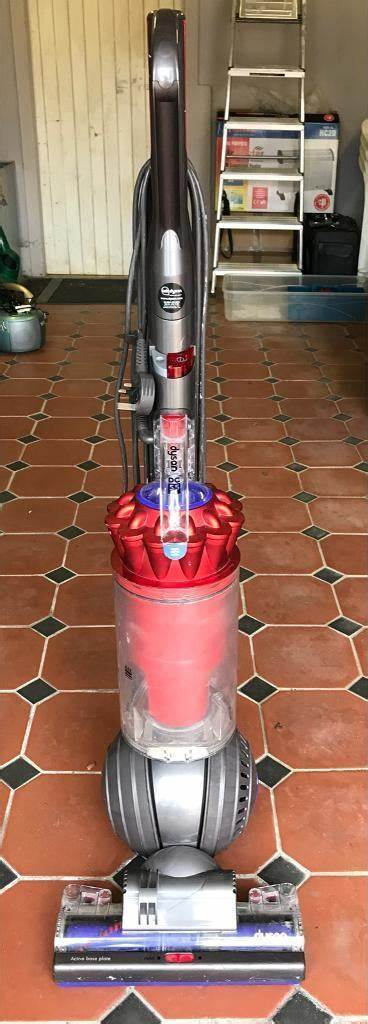
Dyson DC55

==== Cylinder ====
Model name	Launch year	Description
DC02	1995	The DC02, launched in 1995, was the first cylinder (canister) model sold by Dyson. Its shape allowed it to sit on stairs. Like the DC01, it used Dual Cyclone technology. It was not that popular during its production run and sold fewer than the DC01. The DC02 is no longer supported by Dyson. The DC02 was available in several special editions: The De Stijl was coloured purple, red and yellow, in homage to the Dutch art movement from which it takes its name. It was produced in a limited edition of 20,000 units.; The DC02 Clear was produced in clear blue and green plastic, allowing the user to see its internal components through the casing.; The Antarctica Solo model, coloured white and pale blue, helped raise funds for the Breakthrough cancer charity, whilst commemorating Sir Ranulph Fiennes' solo trek across Antarctica. Each of the limited edition run of 100,000 machines bore the image of Ranulph Fiennes' autograph.; The Recyclone was the first vacuum cleaner to be made of recycled plastic. Originally intended as a test-run for a range-wide 'Recyclone' scheme, the concept never went beyond a very small production run of DC02s. They were coloured green with organic pigment.
DC05	1998	The DC05, launched in 1998, was the second cylinder model. It was designed as a replacement for the DC02. The 'Motorhead' version was the first Dyson to offer a "powernozzle", a floor nozzle with a motorized brushroll bar for improved performance on carpets.
DC08	2002	The DC08 was a new cylinder revision, released in 2002, incorporating the Dyson Root Cyclone technology found on the DC07. The DC08 was the replacement for the DC05. It was the first of the Dyson cylinder models to feature the new "Animal" derivative first seen on the DC07, which essentially meant that the cleaner was capable of dealing effectively with pet hair and dander. Animal models came with an air driven turbine floorhead and mini turbo brush for effective pet hair removal from carpets and furnishings – they also came equipped with Hepa post-motor filters. None of the DC08 models had electric motorised floorheads. Like the DC07, the DC08 was fitted with an uprated motor giving it more suction power, handled by the new root 12 cyclone system the DC08 was equipped with. This higher power output could drive the main turbo floorhead without the need for an electric motor and the expensive wiring that the DC05 motorhead had. Lower models in the DC08 range did not come with the turbine floorhead, having only the standard floorheads which were better-suited to hard flooring than carpets. Unlike the DC02, the DC08 did not have storage for its small tools in the body of the cleaner. As with the DC05, tools were stored on a small caddy attached to the suction hose. The DC08 had a long production run; it was upgraded to the DC08 Telescope wrap after the launch of the DC11, to enable it to be stored more efficiently, and was eventually superseded by the DC19. Early in the production run of the DC08, in 2002, Dyson switched production of all its vacuum cleaners from Malmesbury, UK to a new production facility in Malaysia.
DC08T	2003	Next product after the DC11 with 'Telescope Wrap'. Wand handle is telescopic and the hose wraps around the machine. Launched in 2003
DC11	2003	The DC11 was the first Dyson cylinder cleaner with Telescope wrap. Launched around 2003. It had two separate dust bins and cyclone assemblies to make the machine smaller when it was packed away. It was only available in two variants, one coloured yellow and the other was a turquoise/aqua model. The DC11 was quickly superseded by the DC08T Telescope wrap, and not produced for very long.
DC12	2003	Small cylinder machine released in Japan. Launched near around 2003.
DC12plus	2005	Small cylinders in Japan. Top-of-the-range models are fitted with the Dyson Digital Motor, which rotates at 100,000 rpm.
DC19	2007	Cylinder model, without the Telescopic Wrap system. It was the replacement of the DC08, and to all intents and purposes is virtually the same in appearance and design as the DC08.
DC19T2 Origin	2009	Same as DC19, but improved so that the brushbar can pick up on carpets and on hard floors. This model also used a plastic telescopic rod instead of the metal one found on the original DC19.
DC20	2007	'Stowaway', as DC19 but with telescope wrap. Dyson have updated the DC08T (part of the DC08) series to form the DC20. Called the Dyson Stowaway in the UK. The colour scheme is new, and the cleaner is available in Standard, Allergy and Animal.
DC21	2008	Entering into the American Market in 2008, this model is known as the Stowaway in the United States, but as the Motorhead in the United Kingdom and other countries. It is the second cylinder vacuum from Dyson to have a motorised brushbar on the head of the nozzle. It is an advance on the DC08 Telescopic Wrap system, discontinued in some countries including the United Kingdom.
DC22	2008	Known as "Dyson Baby" or "Dyson Compact" or "Dyson Allergy" and two-thirds the size of the DC23. Using the Dyson Digital Motor and Core Separation which adds a third cyclone 'layer' to filter out smaller particles. Has turbine head and motor head versions.
DC23	2009	DC23 is similar in design to the DC21 but uses the new Core Separation that is also in the DC22. There is also a turbinehead animal version in Canada.
DC23 T2	unknown	A DC23 with different accessories and tools.
DC26	2010	Ultra compact cylinder model, the DC26, known as the Dyson "City" is the World's smallest vacuum with constant suction. Even smaller than the DC22. The machine is so small that it will fit onto a piece of A4 paper. With a very small dust container of 0.68 litres, and cord length of 5 metres (16 ft), it was designed for small flats with primarily hard floors. It weighs 5.6 kg (12 lb).
DC29	2012	In Australia the DC29 is a cylinder model, an improved version of DC19. Very similar to DC19T2, the main differences being colour and tooling and non-HEPA machine. A HEPA filter is now included in 2012 'Multi-Floor' white models. In Canada, the DC29 is actually an upright model similar to the DC25. This appears to be the first instance of a particular model number being used on an Upright OR a Cylinder depending on country of destination Supplied to Continental Europe and Australia (Cylinder type) and Canada (Upright type) (Not available in the UK). According to this Dyson review listing on the Australian website, the Dyson DC29 Multi floor is no longer available.
DC32	2009	Basically the same as DC23T2 (in the UK) with a revised colour scheme and additional tooling.
DC36	unknown	DC38 version for Japan, France, South Korea and Canada.
DC37	unknown	DC39 version for Continental Europe and Canada.
DC38	unknown	Smaller version of the DC39.
DC39	2011	Dyson's new cylinder vacuum cleaner released in late 2011. It uses Dyson's Radial Root Cyclone Technology. Uses a ball and a swivel mechanism for improved manoeuvrability.
DC46	unknown	Version of the DC47 cylinder model for the Canadian, and the Japanese market.
DC47	2012	The DC47 was released at the end of 2012, and is an update on the DC38. It is a compact cylinder model based on the technologies featured on the DC38, but introducing the new 2 Tier Radial Root Cyclone Technology for greater suction and filtration, and also the new 2 channel floor tool. It weighs 6 kg (13 lb) and has a suction power of 180 Airwatts.
DC48	2012	Version of the DC49 cylinder model for the Canadian, and the Japanese market. Launched in 2012.
DC49	unknown	Updated DC47, with more compact design and using the new digital motor v4. Billed by Dyson as its "smallest and quietest vacuum cleaner".
DC52	unknown	Version of the DC54 cylinder model for Continental Europe and Singapore
DC53	unknown	Exclusive model for Currys UK, the DC53 comes as the Total Clean version only, and is a DC39 in red and grey, with additional tools.
DC54	2014	Newest ball vacuum cleaner from Dyson. It uses Cinetic technology which Dyson says will not lose suction over 10 years. It is the first Dyson that does not require cleaning of filters. Consists of 54 cyclones with high frequency oscillating tips that vibrate to prevent clogging. Comes in Animal and Multi-Floor versions where it bundles a range of cleaning tools to tackle all surface types.
DC78	2014	A Canada-exclusive revision of the DC54 Cinetic Ball, offered in a single "Turbinehead" configuration.

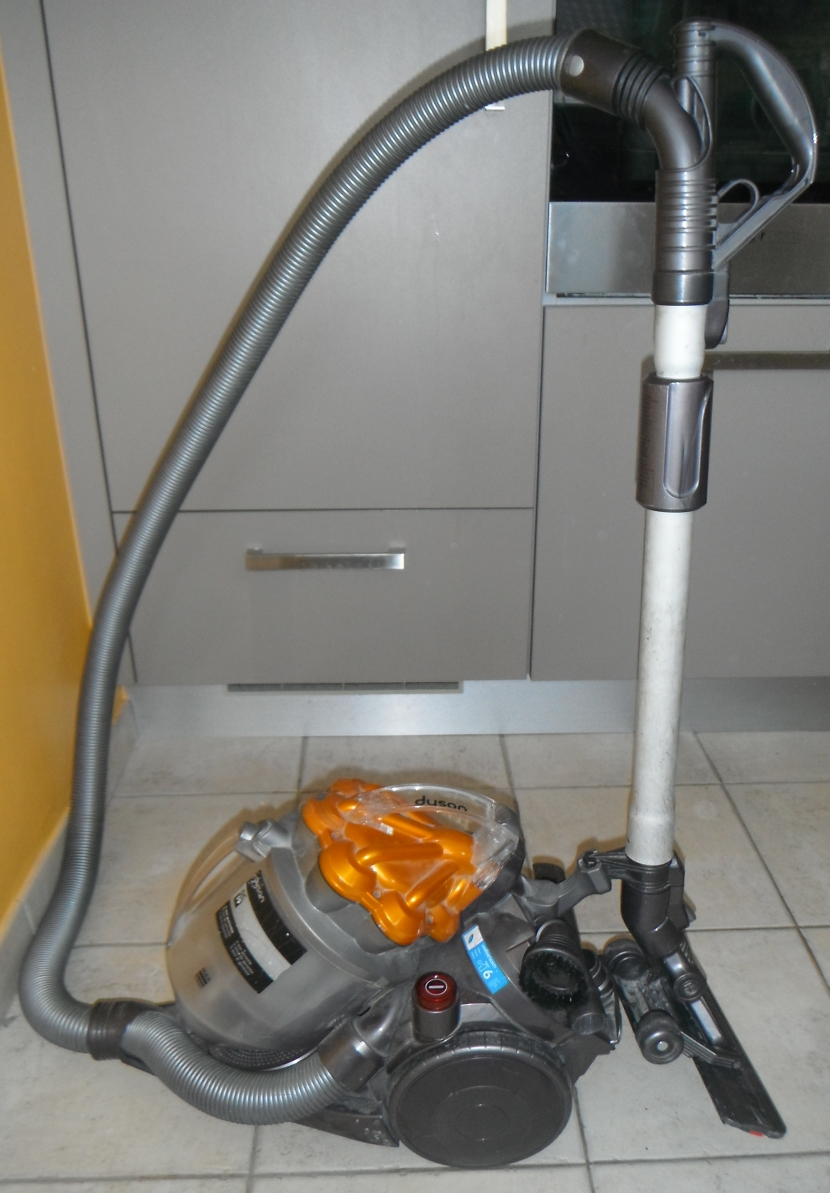
Dyson DC19

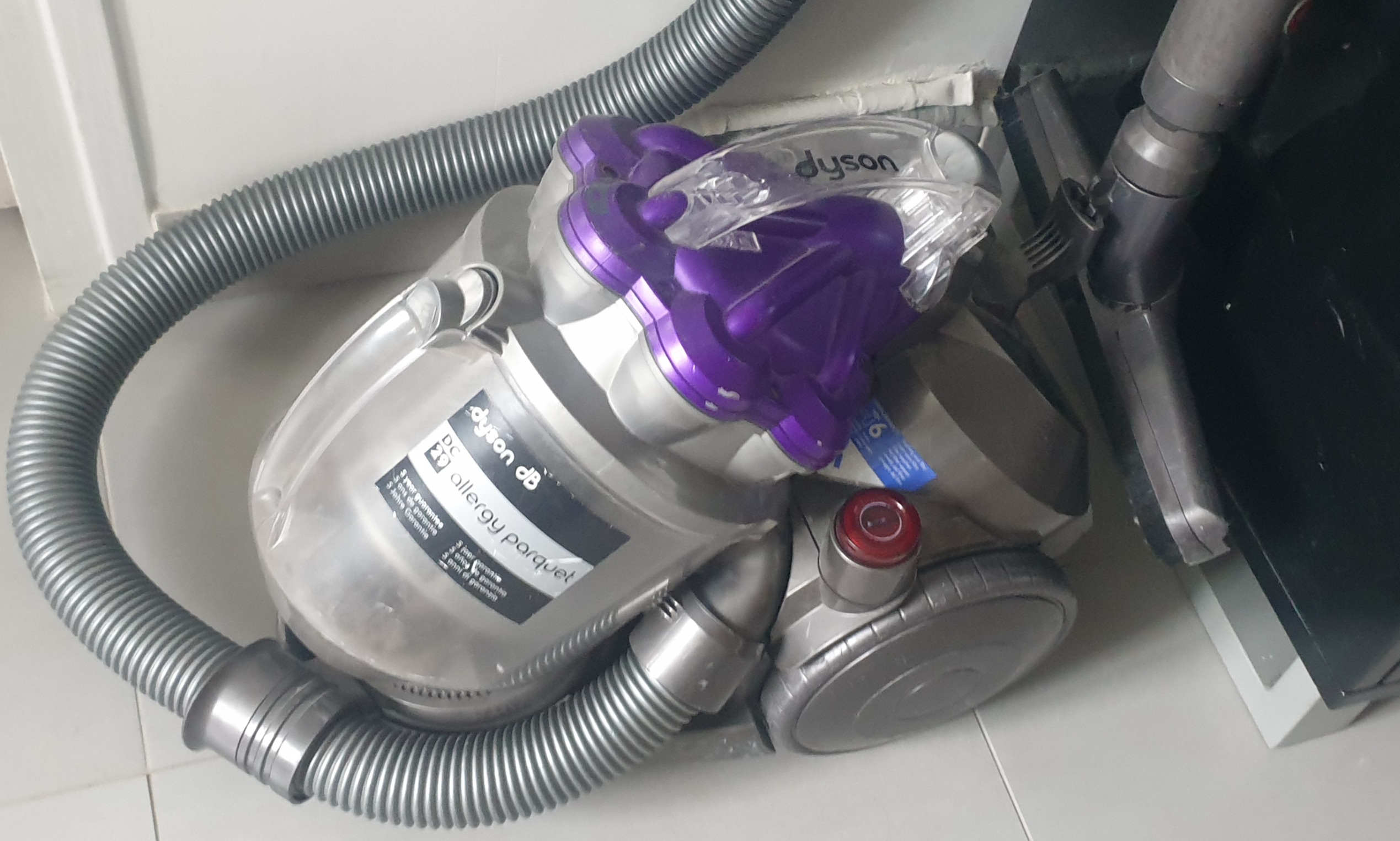
Dyson DC29

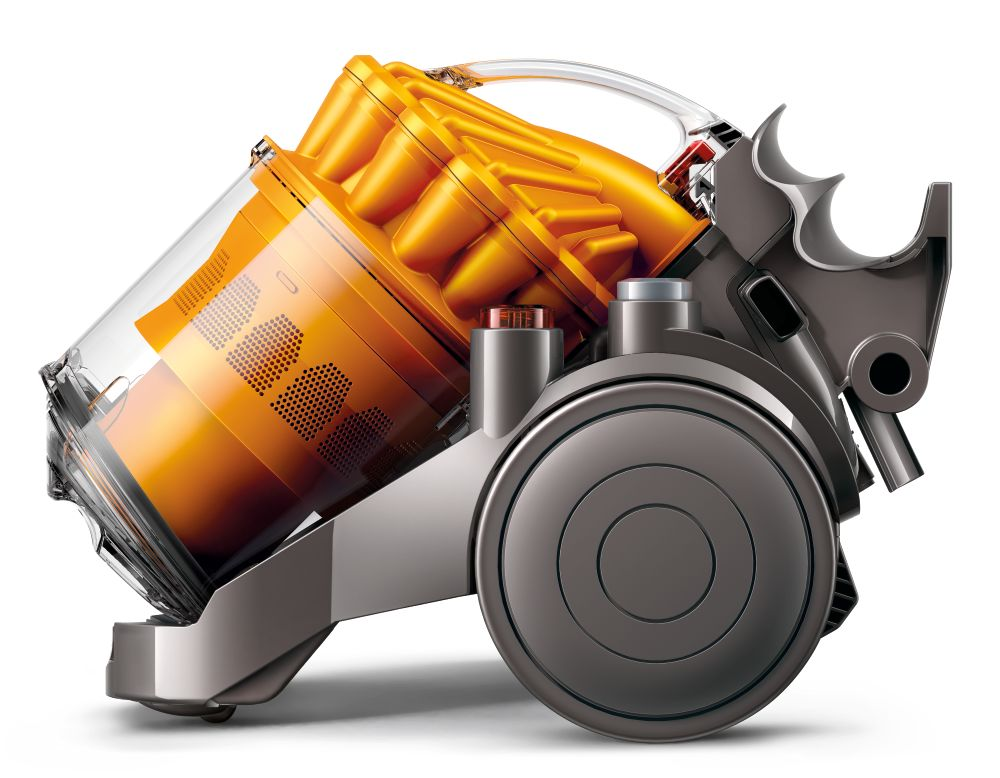
Dyson DC32

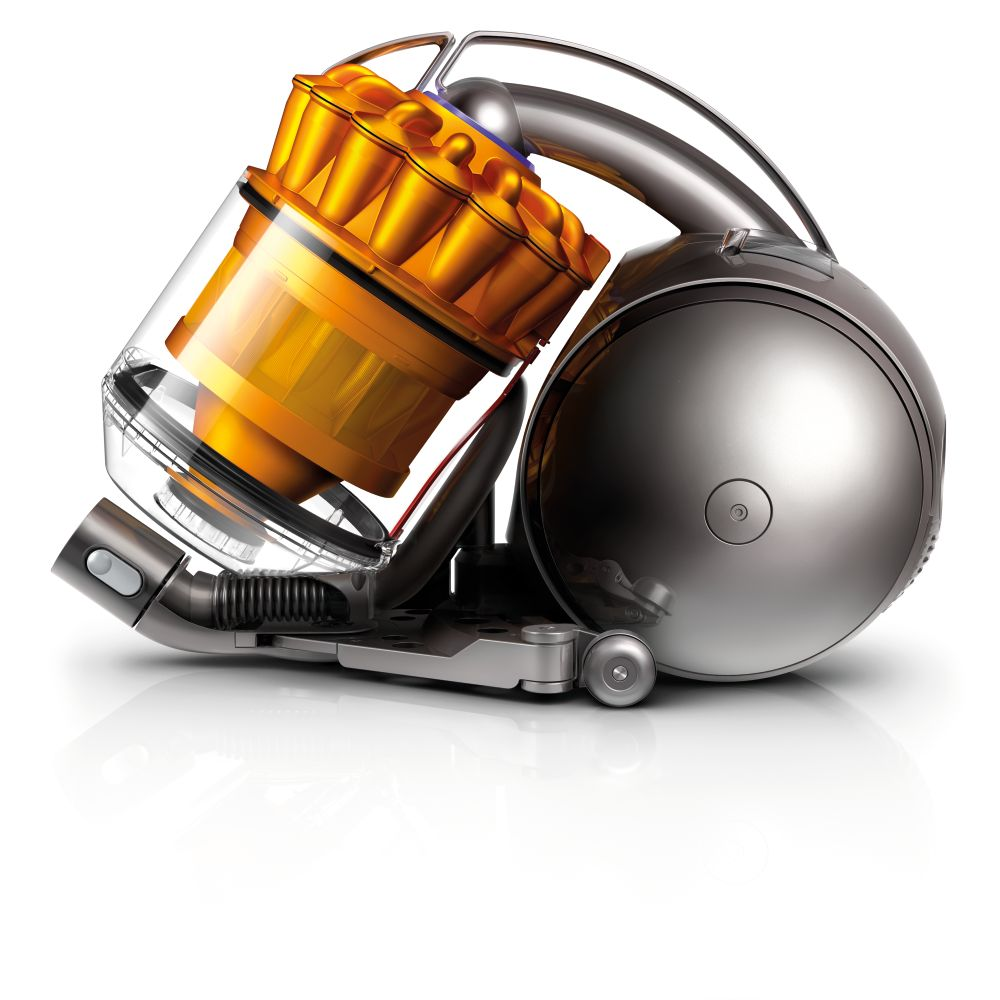
Dyson DC37 (the DC36, DC38 and DC39 are virtually indistinguishable from the DC37)

==== Cordless ====
Model name	Launch year	Description
DC16	2006	The DC16, launched in 2006, is Dyson's first handheld vacuum cleaner based on the same technology as used in the DC14 and DC15 root cyclone upright vacuum cleaners. The DC16 has 36 airwatts of constant suction. The DC16 shares the same styling as the other recent upright and cylinder vacuum cleaners in the Dyson range, and weighs 1.5 kg (3.3 lb). Also available in an Issey Miyake limited edition in which the manifold on the cyclone assembly is pink instead of the standard yellow, and an Animal version with a motorised brushbar for picking up pet hair and gold cyclone manifold. Newest to the range is the DC16 Car and Boat which is designed for car and boat cleaning, supplied with a car 12 V charger and has a blue cyclone manifold. The DC16 was replaced by the DC30 and DC31 which incorporated the Dyson Digital Motor, in replacement of the traditional motors found in the DC16.
DC30	unknown	Powerful handheld with a brushless switched reluctance motor. Can provide 6 minutes of high and constant suction. It is smaller, lighter and more powerful than the DC16, which uses a conventional motor. The DC30 has a yellow cyclone manifold.
DC31	2009	The most powerful handheld, with the same motor technology as the DC30, but with a larger battery and dual power for more runtime. 10 minutes of high constant suction (at the same level as the DC30) or 6 minutes with 70% higher suction. Available as DC31 with a blue (UK and AUS), yellow (US), or red (EU) cyclone manifold, or the DC31 Animal which has a purple cyclone manifold.
DC34	2009	Another Handheld model similar to the DC31; launched in 2009.
DC35	2009	Dyson Digital Slim. Similar design to the DC30/31/34 but with detachable extension tube, modified electronics and motorised brush head. Launched in 2009. It was replaced by the DC44 and DC59.
DC44	2012	The Dyson Digital Slim DC44 is a cordless handstick vacuum cleaner which uses the same motorised brush head as the DC35 as well as the Radial Root Cyclone Technology. Has an extension pole to make it similar to a cylinder cleaner's handle, pole and floorhead. Improves on the DC35 by incorporating a more powerful brush bar motor and having more cleaning tools. It was replaced by the Dyson DC59 / V6.
DC45	unknown	Dyson Digital Slim for Canada and Continental Europe, essentially the same as the DC44
DC56	2013	Known as the Dyson Hard, cordless handstick similar to the DC44, for hard floors, powered by Dyson digital motor V2, has 5 cyclones. Weighs 2.92 pounds (1.32 kg), including a 22.2 V rechargeable lithium ion battery.
DC57	unknown	Handheld, same as DC56 for Canadian and Singapore markets.
DC58	unknown	Handheld, powered by Dyson digital motor V6, has 15 cyclones.
DC59	2014	The DC59 replaces the DC44 and is claimed to remove as much dust as a corded vacuum. This is made possible by the combination of the Dyson digital motor V6, 2 Tier Radial cyclones and the latest floor tool with carbon fibre filaments. This power-dense motor uses digital pulse technology and a neodymium magnet to spin at up to 110,000 times a minute. Its small size means that the machines it powers can also be small, light and powerful. The DC59 (and DC58) were replaced by a very similar cordless handstick simply named the Dyson V6.
DC61	unknown	For specific markets (e.g. Singapore); based on the V6; Handheld Version; very similar to the DC59.
DC62	unknown	For specific markets (e.g. Canada, Singapore, Continental Europe); based on the V6; very similar to the DC59.

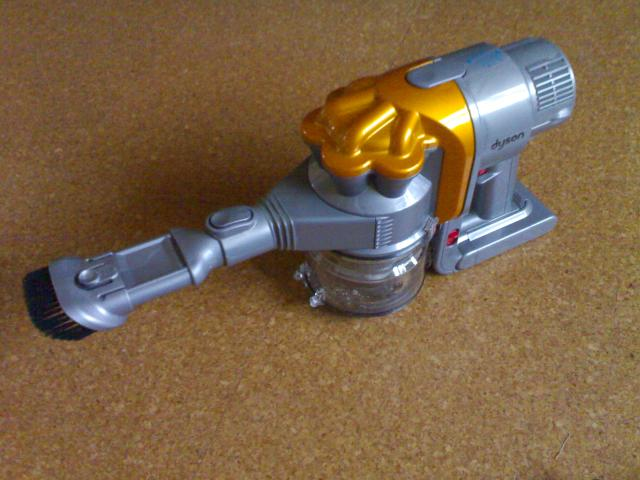
Dyson DC16

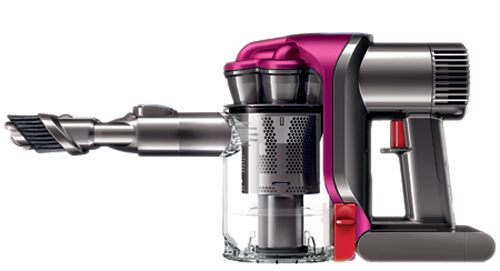
Dyson DC34

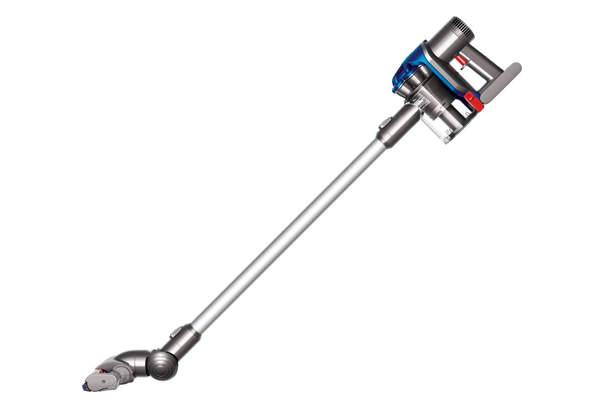
Dyson DC35

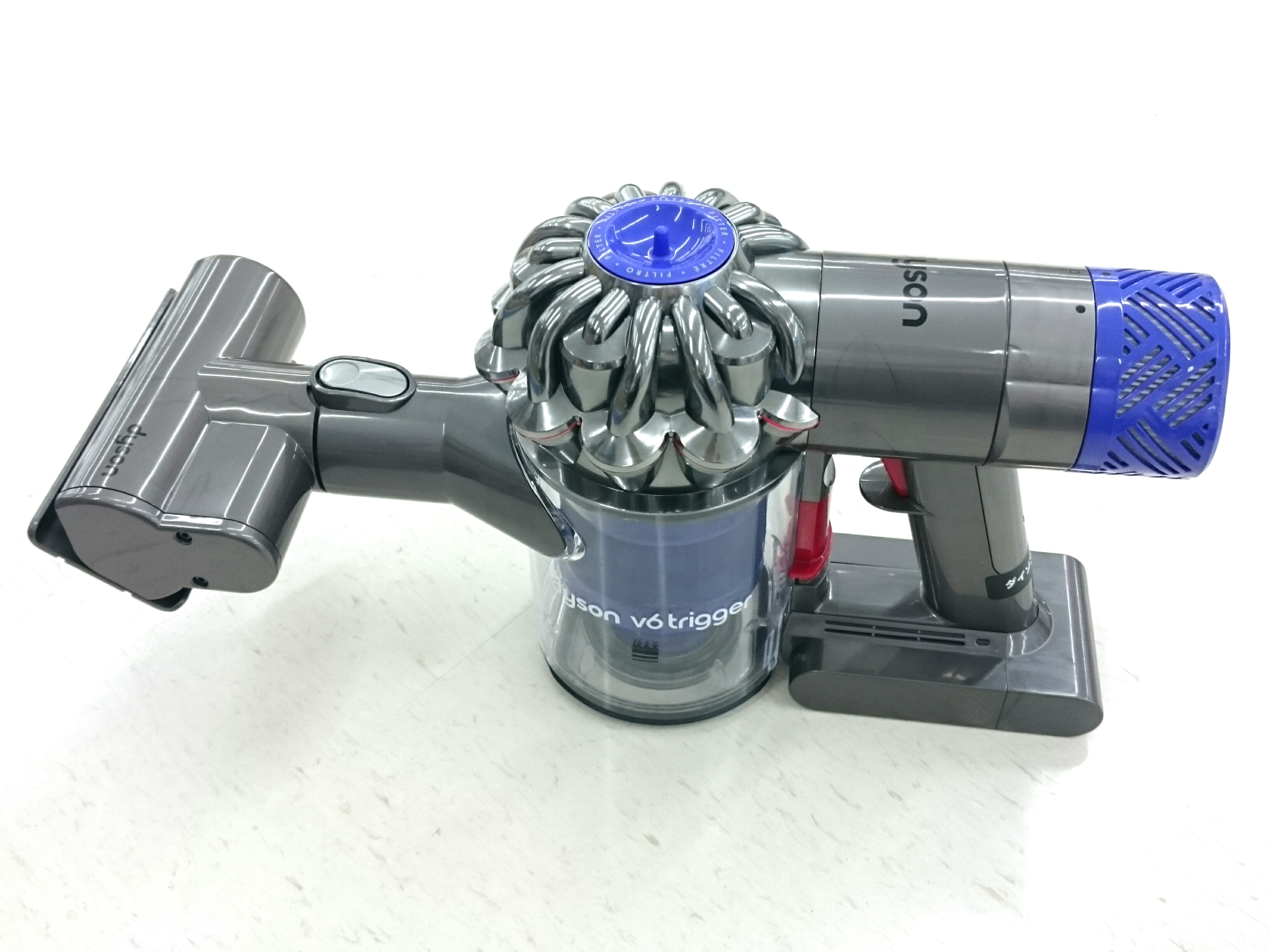
Dyson V6, a relabelled DC59

==== Other ====
Model name	Image	Launch year	Description
DC06	no image	2000 (never sold)	Dyson's first robotic vacuum cleaner, equipped with the Dyson Digital Motor, had not proceeded beyond the home-trial stage. By 2012, as cost and weight needed reducing. It had the ability to 'learn' the room, and to distinguish between solid objects, such as walls and furniture, and human beings, pets, etc. by utilizing sensors and specially-written navigation software. Dyson DC06 first appeared on Dyson's UK website in 2000.

== Airblade hand dryer ==
=== Airblade ===
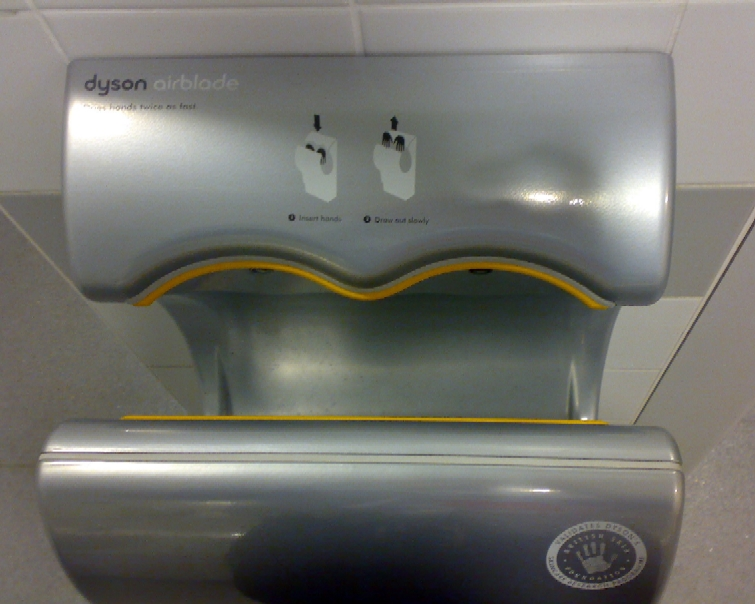
Dyson Airblade (view from top)

The first Dyson Airblade, launched in 2006, is a hand dryer for commercial customers, typically made available in public hand washing facilities. The Airblade uses Dyson's Digital Motor to produce a stream of air that flows at up to 430 mph (690 km/h) and is claimed to dry the hands in 10 to 12 seconds. The Airblade uses a HEPA filter to remove bacteria and mould from the air. The Dyson Airblade is the world's first hygienic commercial hand dryer according to NSF International; it is accredited by the British Skin Foundation and the Royal Institute of Public Health as well. The Dyson Airblade is hazard analysis and critical control points (HACCP) approved.

=== Airblade Wash+Dry ===
The Airblade Wash+Dry launched in 2013 and is a tap with an integrated hand dryer.

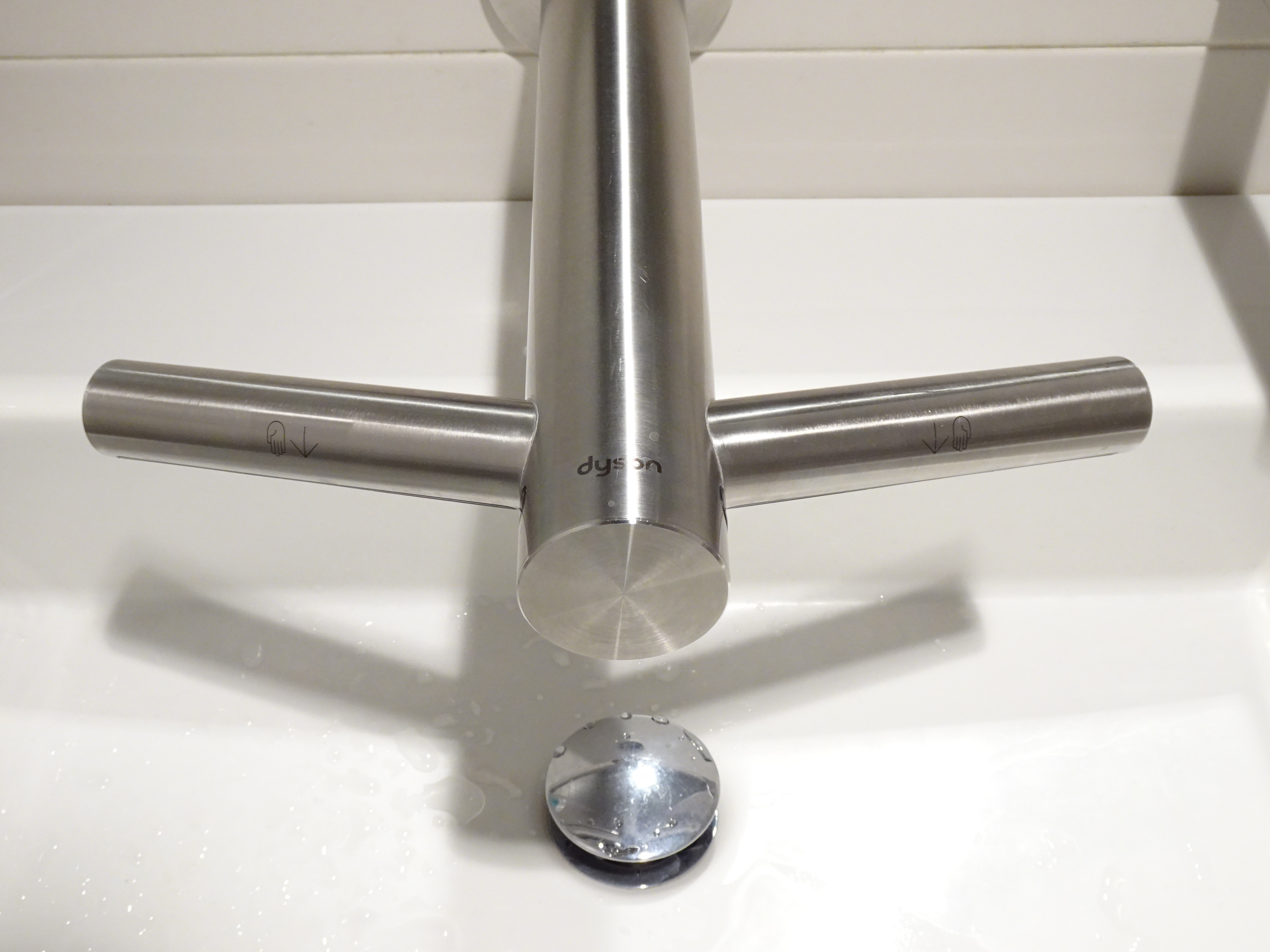
Dyson Airblade Wash+Dry wall hand dryer

== Air Multiplier "bladeless" fans and air purifiers ==
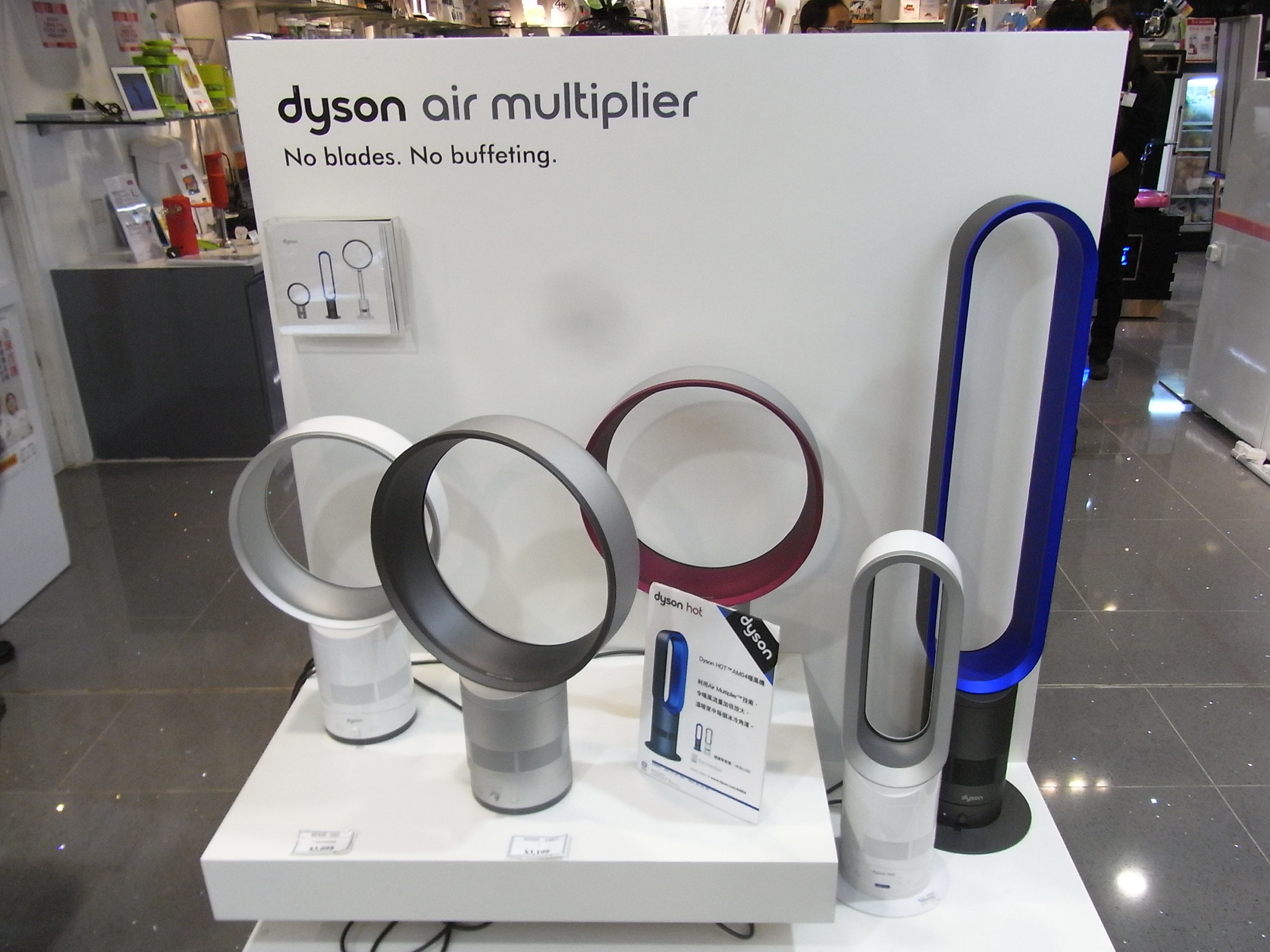
Display of a range of Dyson Air Multipliers

The Dyson "Air Multiplier" was announced in October 2009 as an electric fan, intended to provide smoother airflow and, having no exposed rotating blades, operating in a safer manner than conventional fans. While it is described as a "bladeless" fan, it has blades inside its base. The fan works by drawing air in through an inlet in the base pillar and forcing it through an outlet in the upper ring. The jet of air travels over the airfoil shape of the ring, creating local low pressure, thereby pulling air from behind it as it decelerates in a process known as "induction". Once the air exits the ring it entrains the air in front and alongside. Using this process, a small brushless impeller in the fan's base can power a much larger air outlet without exposing any blades.

Dyson stated that the initially generated air flow is multiplied between 15 and 18 times for the models AM01, AM02 and AM03, projecting a smooth stream of uninterrupted air, without the buffeting effect caused by conventional fan blades. In March 2014, the second-generation models of the Air Multiplier were acoustically re-engineered so that the "bladeless" [sic] fans were quieter than their predecessors, using improved airflow and a Helmholtz resonator to cancel a 10 kHz whine.

Later, Dyson produced combination heating and cooling fans (some with HEPA filters) based on its "air multiplier" design. In addition, some newer designs feature "Jet Focus", the ability to shift between a wide and shallow or a narrower but farther-reaching stream of air, under user control. Most of the Dyson fans and heaters are controlled by small infrared remote controls, which can be held magnetically on the appliance when not in use. A more-limited set of control switches is provided on the body of the appliance.

The design for a "bladeless" fan had been patented by Toshiba in 1981, but was not marketed before the patent expired. An initial patent claim by Dyson was rejected by the Intellectual Property Office, ruling that it "cannot be considered novel or cannot be considered to involve an inventive step" compared to the earlier patent.

The Air Multiplier fan received the Japanese Good Design Award in 2010.

In September 2011, Dyson announced the Dyson Hot fan heater (AM04), using Air Multiplier technology. Like most fan heaters, it has a thermostat to control the temperature, and can also be used as a cooling fan (without heat). All AM04 models made prior to 1 April 2014 are subject to a no-charge product recall for repairs because of a fire risk.

In March 2015, Dyson released an Air Multiplier humidifier, which uses "Ultraviolet Cleanse" technology to clean water by running it through ultraviolet light twice before it is released. A piezoelectric transducer in the base vibrates up to 1.7 million times a second to break the water down into small droplets which are drawn up and added to the air with Air Multiplier technology.

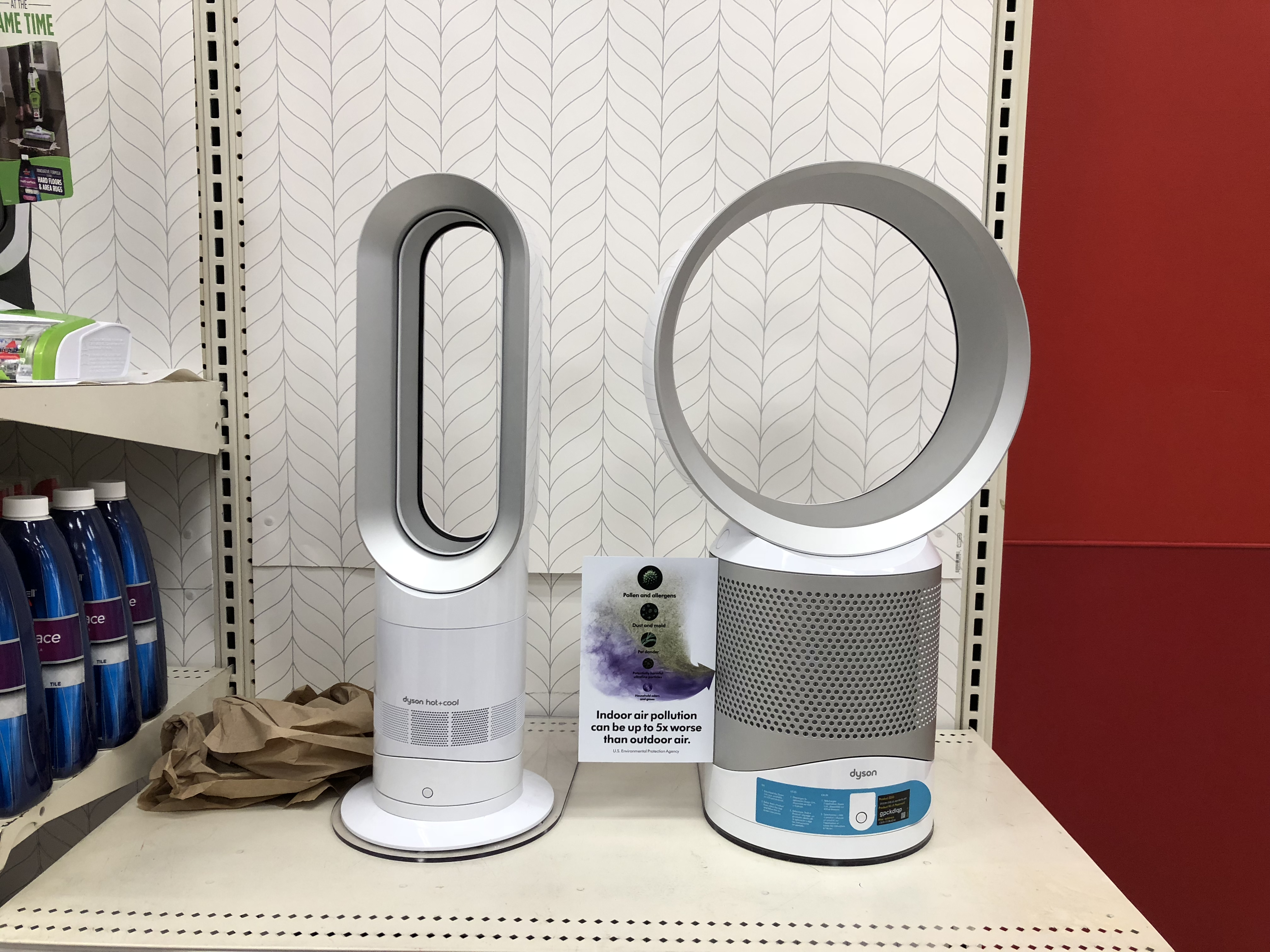
Dyson air-purifiers. Some models can act as heaters or humidifiers and may also feature oscillation.

In January 2016, Dyson released the Dyson Pure Cool air purifier. It uses the same Air Multiplier technology to blow air, as well as a 0.99 micron HEPA filter to trap suspended particles. Along with a coarse filter to trap slow particles, the unit uses low-force velocity to trap fine particles within the filter as well.

Around 2020, Dyson discontinued its basic cooling fans in favour of an extended range of combination fan air purifiers, some with optional heating. High-end models feature automatic monitoring of indoor air quality for particulates and volatile organic compound (VOC) contamination, and reporting over Bluetooth or WiFi to a smartphone app.

== Contrarotator washing machine ==
The Dyson CR01 Contrarotator, first available in November 2000, was a washing machine with two counter-rotating drums, the first of its type. Each drum had 5,000 perforations to help evacuate water. Dyson's next washing machine, in 2004, was the CR02, with "Flowcheck" and "Allergy" models. The company stopped making washing machines in 2005 as they were unprofitable. As of November 2012, Dyson no longer supports or services the Contrarotator washing machines, which it has declared obsolete.

Dyson claimed the contra-rotating design was more effective, however this was disputed by the Consumers' Association. The machines were expensive and mechanically complex. Many machines had the contrarotation feature disabled by a firmware update.

The project was ultimately cancelled due to losses. James Dyson said in 2012 he should have charged more for it.

== Hair care products ==
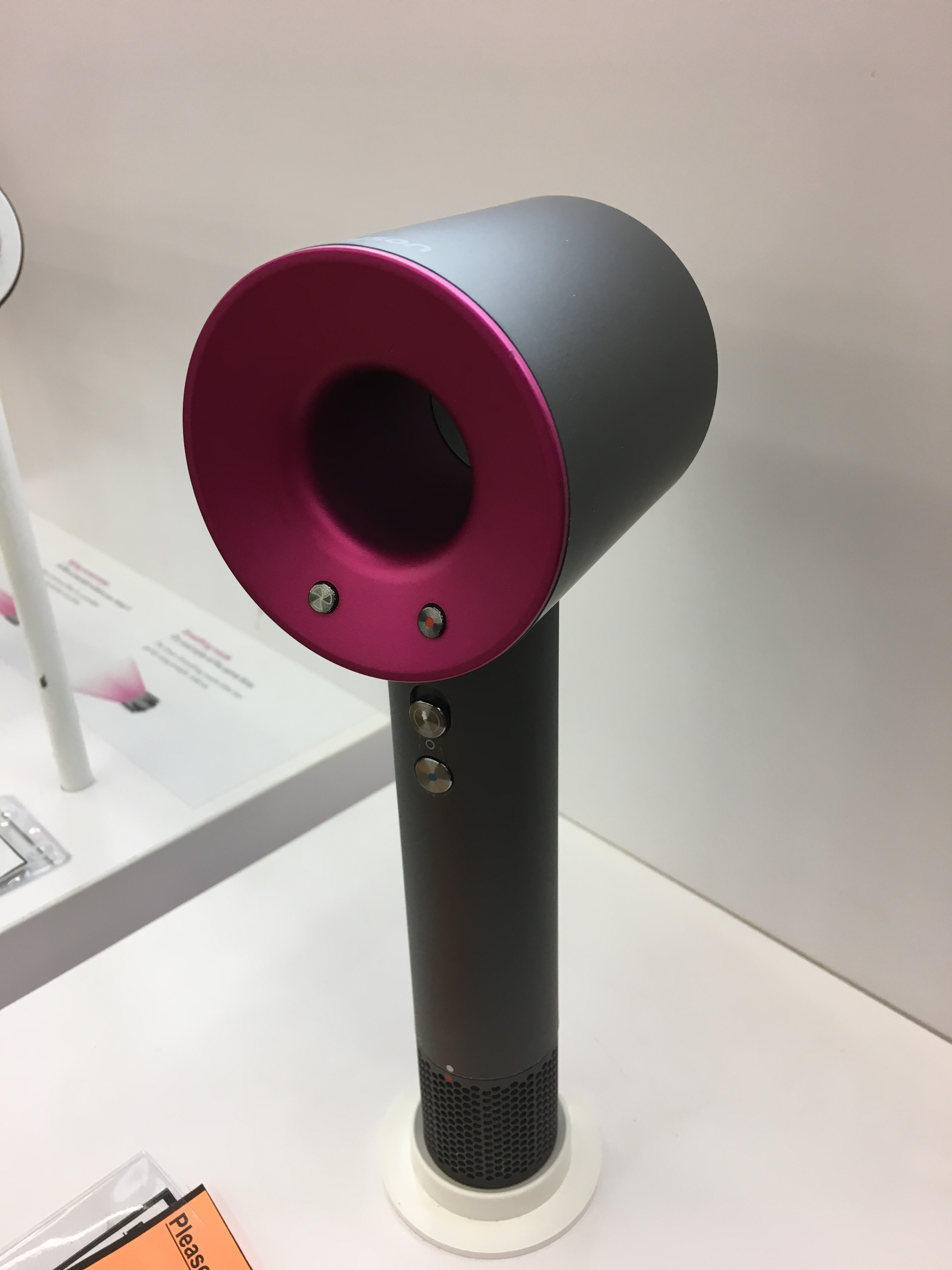
Dyson Supersonic hair dryer.

In April 2016, after being in development for four years, Dyson introduced the "Supersonic" handheld hair dryer, powered by a Dyson Digital Motor V9 housed in the handle. The product was met with good reviews and was an instant success despite its high price point. In March 2024, it introduced the "Supersonic Nural", a variant that adds a time-of-flight sensor (marketed as "scalp protect mode") and a Hall sensor (marketed as "attachment learning") to the device. Also in early 2024, it launched the "Supersonic r", a more streamlined version of the original device. Originally only marketed to hair care professionals, the "Supersonic r" was made available to the general public in March 2025.

In October 2018, the company launched the "Airwrap" styler, which uses the same motor as the Supersonic hair dryer, and is able to style wet hair using the Coandă effect.

In March 2020, Dyson announced a cordless hair straightener called the "Corrale".

In March 2023, Dyson launched the "Airstrait" hair straightener. Instead of using hot plates, the device uses warm air to dry and style hair.

== Lighting ==
In 2015 Dyson introduced the "CSYS" range of LED lamps. The lamps incorporate heat pipe technology designed to extend the life of the product, by cooling the LED emitters.

In 2018, Dyson released the "Lightcycle", featuring the same heat pipe technology as the previous CSYS lights, but with Bluetooth connectivity via the Dyson Link app, and the ability to adjust the intensity and colour temperature to both the individual and their surroundings.

== Toothbrushes ==
The Dyson CameraJet electric toothbrush was unveiled on 1 September 2026 in Paris. It features an integrated water-jet flosser.

== Medical care ==
In March 2020, in light of the COVID-19 pandemic, Dyson announced that they would be supporting UK hospitals by manufacturing ventilators. On 25 March, it was announced that the British government had ordered 10,000 units of The CoVent from the company, subject to passing stringent medical tests. The plan was cancelled a month later, after Dyson realized that it would be difficult for a company with no history of manufacturing ventilators to quickly obtain regulatory approval.

== Wearables ==
Dyson Zone headphones.

In March 2022, Dyson introduced the Dyson Zone, a set of noise-cancelling headphones that doubles as an air purifier. While the Zone air purifying headphones have since been discontinued, they were replaced by the Dyson OnTrack noise-cancelling headphones which were released in July 2024. According to Dyson, key features include best-in-class noise cancellation, 55 hour battery life, and interchangeable ear cushions and outer caps that come in a variety of colors.
