= Airwatt =

Measurement unit of true suction power, specific for vacuum cleaners

Airwatt or air watt is a unit of measurement that represents the true suction power of vacuum cleaners. It is calculated by multiplying the airflow (in cubic metres per second) by the suction pressure (in pascals). This measurement reflects the energy per unit time of the air flowing through the vacuum cleaner's opening, which relates to the electrical power (wattage) consumed by its electrical motor but is always smaller (due to unavoidable losses).

The airwatt is a valuable measurement of vacuum cleaner potential to do useful work, because it directly represents the power that is expelled by the air flow (in the case of a typical household vacuum cleaner). The power of the airflow is equal to the product of pressure and volumetric flow rate. Unlike electrical power consumed by its electric motor (measured in watts), which includes not only power of the air flow but also energy lost due to inefficiencies and unavoidable losses, the airwatt directly reflects the actual airflow and its suction power. Therefore, two vacuum cleaners with the same airwattage will have essentially the same suction power (not to be confused with either suction force or air pressure), whereas devices with the same electrical wattage might vary significantly in efficiency, resulting in different airwattage levels.

== Definition ==
The "power in airwatts" (meaning the effective power in watts) is calculated as the product of suction pressure and air flow rate:

$$P = p \cdot Q$$

Where $P$ is the power in airwatts, $p$ is the suction pressure in pascals, and $Q$ is the air flow rate in cubic metres per second:

$$1\; \text{airW} = 1\; \text{Pa} \ \cdot\ 1\; \text{m}^3 \cdot \text{s}^{-1}$$

Equivalently, in SI base units:

$1\; \text{kg} \cdot \text{m}^2 \cdot \text{s}^{-3} = 1\; \text{kg} \cdot \text{m}^{-1} \cdot \text{s}^{-2} \ \cdot\ 1\; \text{m}^3 \cdot \text{s}^{-1}$

An alternative airwattage formula is from ASTM International (see document ASTM F558 - 13)

$$P = 0.117354  \cdot F \cdot S$$

Where P is the power in airwatts, F is the rate per minute (denoted cu ft/min or CFM) and S is the suction capacity expressed as a pressure in inches of water.

Some manufacturers choose to use the fraction 1/8.5 rather than the ASTM decimal, leading to a less than 0.25% variation in their calculations.

$$P = \frac{ \text{inches of water} \cdot \text{airflow} }{8.5}$$

Where airflow in Cubic Feet per Minute [CFM] is calculated using:

$$\text{airflow} = \frac{ \sqrt{13.35 \cdot D ^2 }}{\text{vacuum} }$$

Where D is the diameter of the orifices.

CFM is always given statistically at its maximum which is at a 2-inch (51 mm) opening. Waterlift, on the other hand, is always given at its maximum: a 0-inch opening. When waterlift is at a 0-inch opening, then the flow rate is zero – no air is moving, thus the power is also 0 airwatts. So one then needs to analyse the curve created by both flow rate and waterlift as the opening changes from 0 to 2 inches (0 to 51 mm); somewhere along this line the power will attain its maximum.

If the flow rate were given in litres per second (L/s), then the pressure would be in kilopascals (kPa). Thus one watt equals one kilopascal times one litre per second: $1~\text{W} = 1~\frac{\text{kPa} \cdot \text{L}}{\text{s}}$

The ratio between the Airwatt rating (power produced in the flow) and electrical watts (power from voltage and current) is the efficiency of the vacuum.

== Ratings recommendations ==
Hoover recommends 100 airwatts for upright vacuum cleaners and 220 airwatts for "cylinder" (canister) vacuum cleaners.
